= List of cities in Minnesota =

Minnesota cities, counties, and townships.

Minnesota is a state located in the Midwestern United States. As of the 2020 census, 5,706,494 lived in Minnesota, further growing to 5,830,405 in the 2025 estimate.

Minnesota is the 22nd-most populous state and 14th-largest by land area, spanning 79,631.811 square miles (206,245.44 km^{2}) of land. Minnesota is divided into 87 counties and contains 856 municipalities consisting of cities.

== City requirements ==
All incorporated communities in Minnesota are called cities, unlike in some states where some are called towns or villages (11 of 50 states only have cities).

Once a city is incorporated in Minnesota, it will continue to be a city even after falling below the minimum required to become a city, and even if the minimum is later raised. A city can de-incorporate, but if citizens decide to re-incorporate at a later date, then new minimum requirements must be met.

By State law, cities in Minnesota are divided into four classes.

- First class: Cities with more than 100,000 inhabitants. Once a city is in the first class, it is not reclassified unless its population decreases by 25 percent from the census figures that last qualified the city as first class.
- Second class: Cities with a population between 20,001 and 100,000
- Third class: Cities with a population between 10,001 and 20,000
- Fourth class: Cities with not more than 10,000 inhabitants

== Cities ==
County seat
State capital and county seat

| 2025 rank | City | Primary county | Secondary county(ies) | Land area (2025) | Population density (2025) | Population | | |
| 2025 rank | City | Primary county | Secondary county(ies) | Land area (2025) | Population density (2025) | 2025 Estimate | 2020 census | 2020–2025 Change |
|---|---|---|---|---|---|---|---|---|
| 1 | Minneapolis | Hennepin | | 54.000 square miles (139.86 km^{2}) | 7,968.96/sq mi (3,076.83/km^{2}) | 430,324 | 429,954 | +0.09% |
| 2 | Saint Paul | Ramsey | | 51.980 square miles (134.63 km^{2}) | 5,900.04/sq mi (2,278.018/km^{2}) | 306,684 | 311,527 | −1.55% |
| 3 | Rochester | Olmsted | | 56.807 square miles (147.13 km^{2}) | 2,187.970/sq mi (844.780/km^{2}) | 124,292 | 121,395 | +2.39% |
| 4 | Bloomington | Hennepin | | 34.699 square miles (89.87 km^{2}) | 2,565.90/sq mi (990.698/km^{2}) | 89,034 | 89,987 | −1.06% |
| 5 | Duluth | St. Louis | | 71.658 square miles (185.59 km^{2}) | 1,232.66/sq mi (475.933/km^{2}) | 88,330 | 86,697 | +1.88% |
| 6 | Brooklyn Park | Hennepin | | 26.076 square miles (67.54 km^{2}) | 3,203.83/sq mi (1,237.005/km^{2}) | 83,543 | 86,478 | −3.39% |
| 7 | Woodbury | Washington | | 34.895 square miles (90.38 km^{2}) | 2,337.24/sq mi (902.414/km^{2}) | 81,558 | 75,102 | +8.60% |
| 8 | Lakeville | Dakota | | 36.915 square miles (95.61 km^{2}) | 2,147.37/sq mi (829.10/km^{2}) | 79,270 | 69,490 | +14.07% |
| 9 | Plymouth | Hennepin | | 32.711 square miles (84.72 km^{2}) | 2,413.32/sq mi (931.787/km^{2}) | 78,942 | 81,026 | −2.57% |
| 10 | Blaine | Anoka | Ramsey | 32.905 square miles (85.22 km^{2}) | 2,328.00/sq mi (898.848/km^{2}) | 76,603 | 70,222 | +9.09% |
| 11 | Maple Grove | Hennepin | | 32.573 square miles (84.36 km^{2}) | 2,268.54/sq mi (875.886/km^{2}) | 73,893 | 70,253 | +5.18% |
| 12 | St. Cloud | Stearns | Benton, Sherburne | 40.216 square miles (104.16 km^{2}) | 1,806.42/sq mi (697.463/km^{2}) | 72,647 | 68,881 | +5.47% |
| 13 | Eagan | Dakota | | 31.180 square miles (80.76 km^{2}) | 2,152.31/sq mi (831.011/km^{2}) | 67,109 | 68,855 | −2.54% |
| 14 | Burnsville | Dakota | | 24.937 square miles (64.59 km^{2}) | 2,616.35/sq mi (1,010.180/km^{2}) | 65,244 | 64,317 | +1.44% |
| 15 | Coon Rapids | Anoka | | 22.601 square miles (58.54 km^{2}) | 2,840.27/sq mi (1,096.64/km^{2}) | 64,193 | 63,599 | +0.93% |
| 16 | Eden Prairie | Hennepin | | 32.496 square miles (84.16 km^{2}) | 1,941.01/sq mi (749.427/km^{2}) | 63,075 | 64,198 | −1.75% |
| 17 | Apple Valley | Dakota | | 16.871 square miles (43.70 km^{2}) | 3,274.73/sq mi (1,264.38/km^{2}) | 55,248 | 56,374 | −2.00% |
| 18 | Edina | Hennepin | | 15.458 square miles (40.04 km^{2}) | 3,516.37/sq mi (1,357.68/km^{2}) | 54,356 | 53,494 | +1.61% |
| 19 | Minnetonka | Hennepin | | 26.929 square miles (69.75 km^{2}) | 2,004.12/sq mi (773.796/km^{2}) | 53,969 | 53,781 | +0.35% |
| 20 | St. Louis Park | Hennepin | | 10.624 square miles (27.52 km^{2}) | 4,708.87/sq mi (1,818.10/km^{2}) | 50,027 | 50,010 | +0.03% |
| 21 | Shakopee | Scott | | 29.515 square miles (76.44 km^{2}) | 1,672.57/sq mi (645.784/km^{2}) | 49,366 | 43,698 | +12.97% |
| 22 | Moorhead | Clay | | 22.283 square miles (57.71 km^{2}) | 2,088.27/sq mi (806.287/km^{2}) | 46,533 | 44,505 | +4.56% |
| 23 | Mankato | Blue Earth | Nicollet, Le Sueur | 20.157 square miles (52.21 km^{2}) | 2,308.33/sq mi (891.25/km^{2}) | 46,529 | 44,488 | +4.59% |
| 24 | Cottage Grove | Washington | | 33.640 square miles (87.13 km^{2}) | 1,296.20/sq mi (500.464/km^{2}) | 43,604 | 38,839 | +12.27% |
| 25 | Maplewood | Ramsey | | 17.042 square miles (44.14 km^{2}) | 2,389.21/sq mi (922.48/km^{2}) | 40,717 | 42,088 | −3.26% |
| 26 | Inver Grove Heights | Dakota | | 27.855 square miles (72.14 km^{2}) | 1,323.75/sq mi (511.102/km^{2}) | 36,873 | 35,801 | +2.99% |
| 27 | Richfield | Hennepin | | 6.778 square miles (17.55 km^{2}) | 5,398.8/sq mi (2,084.48/km^{2}) | 36,593 | 36,994 | −1.08% |
| 28 | Roseville | Ramsey | | 13.022 square miles (33.73 km^{2}) | 2,738.67/sq mi (1,057.41/km^{2}) | 35,663 | 36,254 | −1.63% |
| 29 | Andover | Anoka | | 33.872 square miles (87.73 km^{2}) | 1,000.059/sq mi (386.125/km^{2}) | 33,874 | 32,601 | +3.90% |
| 30 | Savage | Scott | | 15.603 square miles (40.41 km^{2}) | 2,113.1/sq mi (815.86/km^{2}) | 32,970 | 32,465 | +1.56% |
| 31 | Rosemount | Dakota | | 33.254 square miles (86.13 km^{2}) | 958.712/sq mi (370.161/km^{2}) | 31,881 | 25,650 | +24.29% |
| 32 | Brooklyn Center | Hennepin | | 8.003 square miles (20.73 km^{2}) | 3,979.26/sq mi (1,536.40/km^{2}) | 31,846 | 33,782 | −5.73% |
| 33 | Fridley | Anoka | | 10.164 square miles (26.32 km^{2}) | 3,033.16/sq mi (1,171.11/km^{2}) | 30,829 | 29,590 | +4.19% |
| 34 | Oakdale | Washington | | 10.962 square miles (28.39 km^{2}) | 2,790.37/sq mi (1,077.37/km^{2}) | 30,588 | 28,303 | +8.07% |
| 35 | Chaska | Carver | | 17.141 square miles (44.39 km^{2}) | 1,780.12/sq mi (687.307/km^{2}) | 30,513 | 27,810 | +9.72% |
| 36 | Ramsey | Anoka | | 28.856 square miles (74.74 km^{2}) | 1,026.61/sq mi (396.378/km^{2}) | 29,624 | 27,646 | +7.15% |
| 37 | Prior Lake | Scott | | 16.296 square miles (42.21 km^{2}) | 1,726.8/sq mi (666.72/km^{2}) | 28,140 | 27,617 | +1.89% |
| 38 | Elk River | Sherburne | | 42.326 square miles (109.62 km^{2}) | 659.075/sq mi (254.470/km^{2}) | 27,896 | 25,835 | +7.98% |
| 39 | Shoreview | Ramsey | | 10.767 square miles (27.89 km^{2}) | 2,498.93/sq mi (964.84/km^{2}) | 26,906 | 26,921 | −0.06% |
| 40 | Austin | Mower | | 13.433 square miles (34.79 km^{2}) | 1,986.82/sq mi (767.12/km^{2}) | 26,689 | 26,174 | +1.97% |
| 41 | Owatonna | Steele | | 15.173 square miles (39.30 km^{2}) | 1,755.29/sq mi (677.72/km^{2}) | 26,633 | 26,420 | +0.81% |
| 42 | Winona | Winona | | 18.991 square miles (49.19 km^{2}) | 1,396.98/sq mi (539.38/km^{2}) | 26,530 | 25,948 | +2.24% |
| 43 | Chanhassen | Carver | Hennepin | 20.361 square miles (52.73 km^{2}) | 1,264.57/sq mi (488.255/km^{2}) | 25,748 | 25,947 | −0.77% |
| 44 | Farmington | Dakota | | 15.807 square miles (40.94 km^{2}) | 1,608.46/sq mi (621.03/km^{2}) | 25,425 | 23,632 | +7.59% |
| 45 | Faribault | Rice | | 15.709 square miles (40.69 km^{2}) | 1,594.0/sq mi (615.44/km^{2}) | 25,040 | 24,453 | +2.40% |
| 46 | Otsego | Wright | | 29.609 square miles (76.69 km^{2}) | 828.295/sq mi (319.807/km^{2}) | 24,525 | 19,966 | +22.83% |
| 47 | White Bear Lake | Ramsey | Washington | 8.045 square miles (20.84 km^{2}) | 2,907.64/sq mi (1,122.65/km^{2}) | 23,392 | 24,883 | −5.99% |
| 48 | Lino Lakes | Anoka | | 28.217 square miles (73.08 km^{2}) | 822.91/sq mi (317.73/km^{2}) | 23,220 | 21,399 | +8.51% |
| 49 | Champlin | Hennepin | | 8.151 square miles (21.11 km^{2}) | 2,837.08/sq mi (1,095.40/km^{2}) | 23,125 | 23,919 | −3.32% |
| 50 | Hastings | Dakota | Washington | 10.353 square miles (26.81 km^{2}) | 2,179.37/sq mi (841.46/km^{2}) | 22,563 | 22,154 | +1.85% |
| 51 | St. Michael | Wright | | 32.683 square miles (84.65 km^{2}) | 688.370/sq mi (265.781/km^{2}) | 22,498 | 18,235 | +23.38% |
| 52 | Columbia Heights | Anoka | | 3.408 square miles (8.83 km^{2}) | 6,596.8/sq mi (2,547.1/km^{2}) | 22,482 | 21,973 | +2.32% |
| 53 | Crystal | Hennepin | | 5.786 square miles (14.99 km^{2}) | 3,843.6/sq mi (1,484.02/km^{2}) | 22,239 | 23,330 | −4.68% |
| 54 | New Brighton | Ramsey | | 6.495 square miles (16.82 km^{2}) | 3,411.7/sq mi (1,317.27/km^{2}) | 22,159 | 23,454 | −5.52% |
| 55 | Willmar | Kandiyohi | | 14.241 square miles (36.88 km^{2}) | 1,544.91/sq mi (596.49/km^{2}) | 22,001 | 21,015 | +4.69% |
| 56 | Northfield | Rice | Dakota | 8.614 square miles (22.31 km^{2}) | 2,553.05/sq mi (985.74/km^{2}) | 21,992 | 20,790 | +5.78% |
| 57 | West St. Paul | Dakota | | 4.908 square miles (12.71 km^{2}) | 4,472.3/sq mi (1,726.8/km^{2}) | 21,950 | 20,615 | +6.48% |
| 58 | Golden Valley | Hennepin | | 10.204 square miles (26.43 km^{2}) | 2,089.87/sq mi (806.90/km^{2}) | 21,325 | 22,552 | −5.44% |
| 59 | Forest Lake | Washington | | 30.547 square miles (79.12 km^{2}) | 685.894/sq mi (264.825/km^{2}) | 20,952 | 20,611 | +1.65% |
| 60 | New Hope | Hennepin | | 5.058 square miles (13.10 km^{2}) | 4,113.7/sq mi (1,588.30/km^{2}) | 20,807 | 21,986 | −5.36% |
| 61 | South St. Paul | Dakota | | 5.625 square miles (14.57 km^{2}) | 3,650.1/sq mi (1,409.32/km^{2}) | 20,532 | 20,759 | −1.09% |
| 62 | Sartell | Stearns | Benton | 10.449 square miles (27.06 km^{2}) | 1,906.21/sq mi (735.99/km^{2}) | 19,918 | 19,351 | +2.93% |
| 63 | Hopkins | Hennepin | | 4.060 square miles (10.52 km^{2}) | 4,808.6/sq mi (1,856.62/km^{2}) | 19,523 | 19,079 | +2.33% |
| 64 | Stillwater | Washington | | 8.049 square miles (20.85 km^{2}) | 2,404.52/sq mi (928.39/km^{2}) | 19,354 | 19,394 | −0.21% |
| 65 | Albert Lea | Freeborn | | 13.286 square miles (34.41 km^{2}) | 1,371.14/sq mi (529.40/km^{2}) | 18,217 | 18,492 | −1.49% |
| 66 | Anoka | Anoka | | 6.668 square miles (17.27 km^{2}) | 2,724.81/sq mi (1,052.05/km^{2}) | 18,169 | 17,921 | +1.38% |
| 67 | Hugo | Washington | | 33.463 square miles (86.67 km^{2}) | 513.014/sq mi (198.076/km^{2}) | 17,167 | 15,766 | +8.89% |
| 68 | Ham Lake | Anoka | | 34.415 square miles (89.13 km^{2}) | 496.993/sq mi (191.890/km^{2}) | 17,104 | 16,464 | +3.89% |
| 69 | Buffalo | Wright | | 7.761 square miles (20.10 km^{2}) | 2,174.72/sq mi (839.66/km^{2}) | 16,878 | 16,168 | +4.39% |
| 70 | Red Wing | Goodhue | | 34.831 square miles (90.21 km^{2}) | 482.473/sq mi (186.284/km^{2}) | 16,805 | 16,547 | +1.56% |
| 71 | Hibbing | St. Louis | | 182.027 square miles (471.45 km^{2}) | 86.9267/sq mi (33.5626/km^{2}) | 15,823 | 16,214 | −2.41% |
| 72 | Bemidji | Beltrami | | 17.440 square miles (45.17 km^{2}) | 904.24/sq mi (349.13/km^{2}) | 15,770 | 14,574 | +8.21% |
| 73 | Monticello | Wright | | 9.146 square miles (23.69 km^{2}) | 1,713.3/sq mi (661.52/km^{2}) | 15,670 | 14,455 | +8.41% |
| 74 | Rogers | Hennepin | | 25.409 square miles (65.81 km^{2}) | 614.19/sq mi (237.141/km^{2}) | 15,606 | 13,295 | +17.38% |
| 75 | Alexandria | Douglas | | 17.222 square miles (44.60 km^{2}) | 873.59/sq mi (337.296/km^{2}) | 15,045 | 14,335 | +4.95% |
| 76 | Hutchinson | McLeod | | 8.498 square miles (22.01 km^{2}) | 1,724.52/sq mi (665.84/km^{2}) | 14,655 | 14,599 | +0.38% |
| 77 | Brainerd | Crow Wing | | 12.130 square miles (31.42 km^{2}) | 1,189.45/sq mi (459.25/km^{2}) | 14,428 | 14,395 | +0.23% |
| 78 | Lake Elmo | Washington | | 22.101 square miles (57.24 km^{2}) | 650.47/sq mi (251.147/km^{2}) | 14,376 | 11,335 | +26.83% |
| 79 | Fergus Falls | Otter Tail | | 14.388 square miles (37.26 km^{2}) | 990.13/sq mi (382.292/km^{2}) | 14,246 | 14,119 | +0.90% |
| 80 | Marshall | Lyon | | 10.341 square miles (26.78 km^{2}) | 1,370.37/sq mi (529.10/km^{2}) | 14,171 | 13,628 | +3.98% |
| 81 | North Mankato | Nicollet | Blue Earth | 6.467 square miles (16.75 km^{2}) | 2,190.35/sq mi (845.70/km^{2}) | 14,165 | 14,275 | −0.77% |
| 82 | Waconia | Carver | | 5.613 square miles (14.54 km^{2}) | 2,514.34/sq mi (970.79/km^{2}) | 14,113 | 13,033 | +8.29% |
| 83 | Robbinsdale | Hennepin | | 2.795 square miles (7.24 km^{2}) | 5,019.7/sq mi (1,938.1/km^{2}) | 14,030 | 14,646 | −4.21% |
| 84 | Worthington | Nobles | | 7.899 square miles (20.46 km^{2}) | 1,769.72/sq mi (683.29/km^{2}) | 13,979 | 13,947 | +0.23% |
| 85 | New Ulm | Brown | | 10.176 square miles (26.36 km^{2}) | 1,362.32/sq mi (526.00/km^{2}) | 13,863 | 14,120 | −1.82% |
| 86 | Sauk Rapids | Benton | | 6.288 square miles (16.29 km^{2}) | 2,189.57/sq mi (845.40/km^{2}) | 13,768 | 13,862 | −0.68% |
| 87 | Vadnais Heights | Ramsey | | 6.971 square miles (18.05 km^{2}) | 1,872.33/sq mi (722.91/km^{2}) | 13,052 | 12,912 | +1.08% |
| 88 | Big Lake | Sherburne | | 7.234 square miles (18.74 km^{2}) | 1,787.25/sq mi (690.06/km^{2}) | 12,929 | 11,686 | +10.64% |
| 89 | Mounds View | Ramsey | | 4.057 square miles (10.51 km^{2}) | 3,151.6/sq mi (1,216.84/km^{2}) | 12,786 | 13,249 | −3.49% |
| 90 | North St. Paul | Ramsey | | 2.857 square miles (7.40 km^{2}) | 4,473.2/sq mi (1,727.1/km^{2}) | 12,780 | 12,364 | +3.36% |
| 91 | East Bethel | Anoka | | 44.580 square miles (115.46 km^{2}) | 282.750/sq mi (109.170/km^{2}) | 12,605 | 11,786 | +6.95% |
| 92 | Victoria | Carver | | 12.771 square miles (33.08 km^{2}) | 974.63/sq mi (376.307/km^{2}) | 12,447 | 10,546 | +18.03% |
| 93 | Cloquet | Carlton | | 35.217 square miles (91.21 km^{2}) | 352.074/sq mi (135.937/km^{2}) | 12,399 | 12,568 | −1.34% |
| 94 | North Branch | Chisago | | 37.318 square miles (96.65 km^{2}) | 332.226/sq mi (128.273/km^{2}) | 12,398 | 10,787 | +14.93% |
| 95 | St. Peter | Nicollet | | 6.282 square miles (16.27 km^{2}) | 1,954.00/sq mi (754.44/km^{2}) | 12,275 | 12,066 | +1.73% |
| 96 | Mendota Heights | Dakota | | 9.075 square miles (23.50 km^{2}) | 1,264.46/sq mi (488.21/km^{2}) | 11,475 | 11,744 | −2.29% |
| 97 | Dayton | Hennepin | Wright | 23.419 square miles (60.65 km^{2}) | 486.87/sq mi (187.981/km^{2}) | 11,402 | 7,262 | +57.01% |
| 98 | Grand Rapids | Itasca | | 22.378 square miles (57.96 km^{2}) | 499.64/sq mi (192.913/km^{2}) | 11,181 | 11,126 | +0.49% |
| 99 | Cambridge | Isanti | | 7.480 square miles (19.37 km^{2}) | 1,482.6/sq mi (572.44/km^{2}) | 11,090 | 9,611 | +15.39% |
| 100 | Little Canada | Ramsey | | 3.898 square miles (10.10 km^{2}) | 2,710.9/sq mi (1,046.68/km^{2}) | 10,567 | 10,819 | −2.33% |
| 101 | Hermantown | St. Louis | | 34.361 square miles (88.99 km^{2}) | 294.23/sq mi (113.60/km^{2}) | 10,110 | 10,221 | −1.09% |
| 102 | Fairmont | Martin | | 15.004 square miles (38.86 km^{2}) | 673.09/sq mi (259.880/km^{2}) | 10,099 | 10,487 | −3.70% |
| 103 | Detroit Lakes | Becker | | 11.972 square miles (31.01 km^{2}) | 836.87/sq mi (323.117/km^{2}) | 10,019 | 9,869 | +1.52% |
| 104 | St. Anthony | Hennepin | Ramsey | 2.236 square miles (5.79 km^{2}) | 4,467.4/sq mi (1,724.9/km^{2}) | 9,989 | 9,257 | +7.91% |
| 105 | Arden Hills | Ramsey | | 8.465 square miles (21.92 km^{2}) | 1,132.07/sq mi (437.10/km^{2}) | 9,583 | 9,939 | −3.58% |
| 106 | Oak Grove | Anoka | | 33.908 square miles (87.82 km^{2}) | 279.462/sq mi (107.901/km^{2}) | 9,476 | 8,929 | +6.13% |
| 107 | Minnetrista | Hennepin | | 26.108 square miles (67.62 km^{2}) | 362.264/sq mi (139.871/km^{2}) | 9,458 | 8,262 | +14.48% |
| 108 | Little Falls | Morrison | | 8.044 square miles (20.83 km^{2}) | 1,153.28/sq mi (445.28/km^{2}) | 9,277 | 9,140 | +1.50% |
| 109 | Corcoran | Hennepin | | 35.801 square miles (92.72 km^{2}) | 258.903/sq mi (99.963/km^{2}) | 9,269 | 6,185 | +49.86% |
| 110 | Baxter | Crow Wing | | 18.852 square miles (48.83 km^{2}) | 488.91/sq mi (188.771/km^{2}) | 9,217 | 8,612 | +7.03% |
| 111 | Mound | Hennepin | | 2.861 square miles (7.41 km^{2}) | 3,168.1/sq mi (1,223.22/km^{2}) | 9,064 | 9,398 | −3.55% |
| 112 | Waseca | Waseca | | 4.295 square miles (11.12 km^{2}) | 2,103.6/sq mi (812.21/km^{2}) | 9,035 | 9,229 | −2.10% |
| 113 | East Grand Forks | Polk | | 5.946 square miles (15.40 km^{2}) | 1,497.81/sq mi (578.31/km^{2}) | 8,906 | 9,176 | −2.94% |
| 114 | Thief River Falls | Pennington | | 6.003 square miles (15.55 km^{2}) | 1,465.77/sq mi (565.94/km^{2}) | 8,799 | 8,749 | +0.57% |
| 115 | St. Francis | Anoka | Isanti | 23.315 square miles (60.39 km^{2}) | 370.362/sq mi (142.998/km^{2}) | 8,635 | 8,142 | +6.06% |
| 116 | Albertville | Wright | | 4.418 square miles (11.44 km^{2}) | 1,933.9/sq mi (746.69/km^{2}) | 8,544 | 7,896 | +8.21% |
| 117 | Waite Park | Stearns | | 12.628 square miles (32.71 km^{2}) | 669.1/sq mi (258.36/km^{2}) | 8,450 | 8,341 | +1.31% |
| 118 | Orono | Hennepin | | 15.917 square miles (41.22 km^{2}) | 521.52/sq mi (201.359/km^{2}) | 8,301 | 8,315 | −0.17% |
| 119 | New Prague | Scott | Le Sueur | 3.937 square miles (10.20 km^{2}) | 2,092.5/sq mi (807.90/km^{2}) | 8,238 | 8,162 | +0.93% |
| 120 | Mahtomedi | Washington | | 3.468 square miles (8.98 km^{2}) | 2,361.3/sq mi (911.70/km^{2}) | 8,189 | 8,138 | +0.63% |
| 121 | Virginia | St. Louis | | 18.769 square miles (48.61 km^{2}) | 436.20/sq mi (168.417/km^{2}) | 8,187 | 8,421 | −2.78% |
| 122 | Wyoming | Chisago | | 20.652 square miles (53.49 km^{2}) | 393.23/sq mi (151.827/km^{2}) | 8,121 | 8,032 | +1.11% |
| 123 | Delano | Wright | | 5.020 square miles (13.00 km^{2}) | 1,551.39/sq mi (599.00/km^{2}) | 7,788 | 6,484 | +20.11% |
| 124 | Isanti | Isanti | | 5.092 square miles (13.19 km^{2}) | 1,514.93/sq mi (584.92/km^{2}) | 7,714 | 6,804 | +13.37% |
| 125 | Belle Plaine | Scott | | 5.972 square miles (15.47 km^{2}) | 1,277.96/sq mi (493.42/km^{2}) | 7,632 | 7,395 | +3.20% |
| 126 | Shorewood | Hennepin | | 5.311 square miles (13.76 km^{2}) | 1,434.8/sq mi (554.0/km^{2}) | 7,620 | 7,783 | −2.09% |
| 127 | Medina | Hennepin | | 25.551 square miles (66.18 km^{2}) | 291.97/sq mi (112.73/km^{2}) | 7,460 | 6,837 | +9.11% |
| 128 | Crookston | Polk | | 5.115 square miles (13.25 km^{2}) | 1,441.84/sq mi (556.70/km^{2}) | 7,375 | 7,482 | −1.43% |
| 129 | Kasson | Dodge | | 3.503 square miles (9.07 km^{2}) | 2,098.2/sq mi (810.1/km^{2}) | 7,350 | 6,851 | +7.28% |
| 130 | Baldwin | Sherburne | | 32.896 square miles (85.20 km^{2}) | 223.43/sq mi (86.27/km^{2}) | 7,231 | 7,104 | +1.79% |
| 131 | Carver | Carver | | 4.911 square miles (12.72 km^{2}) | 1,465.69/sq mi (565.91/km^{2}) | 7,198 | 5,829 | +23.49% |
| 132 | Spring Lake Park | Anoka | Ramsey | 1.995 square miles (5.17 km^{2}) | 3,572.4/sq mi (1,379.3/km^{2}) | 7,127 | 7,188 | −0.85% |
| 133 | Jordan | Scott | | 3.708 square miles (9.60 km^{2}) | 1,884.6/sq mi (727.64/km^{2}) | 6,988 | 6,656 | +4.99% |
| 134 | Zimmerman | Sherburne | | 3.766 square miles (9.75 km^{2}) | 1,833.2/sq mi (707.82/km^{2}) | 6,904 | 6,189 | +11.55% |
| 135 | Stewartville | Olmsted | | 3.360 square miles (8.70 km^{2}) | 2,038.7/sq mi (787.1/km^{2}) | 6,850 | 6,687 | +2.44% |
| 136 | St. Joseph | Stearns | | 9.292 square miles (24.07 km^{2}) | 736.76/sq mi (284.47/km^{2}) | 6,846 | 7,029 | −2.60% |
| 137 | Byron | Olmsted | | 3.168 square miles (8.21 km^{2}) | 2,127.5/sq mi (821.4/km^{2}) | 6,740 | 6,312 | +6.78% |
| 138 | Litchfield | Meeker | | 4.505 square miles (11.67 km^{2}) | 1,449.06/sq mi (559.48/km^{2}) | 6,528 | 6,624 | −1.45% |
| 139 | Chisago City | Chisago | | 17.822 square miles (46.16 km^{2}) | 334.14/sq mi (129.011/km^{2}) | 5,955 | 5,558 | +7.14% |
| 140 | Credit River | Scott | | 23.403 square miles (60.61 km^{2}) | 241.166/sq mi (93.115/km^{2}) | 5,644 | 5,493 | +2.75% |
| 141 | Glencoe | McLeod | | 3.168 square miles (8.21 km^{2}) | 1,777.8/sq mi (686.40/km^{2}) | 5,632 | 5,744 | −1.95% |
| 142 | Newport | Washington | | 3.618 square miles (9.37 km^{2}) | 1,527.1/sq mi (589.61/km^{2}) | 5,525 | 3,797 | +45.51% |
| 143 | International Falls | Koochiching | | 6.798 square miles (17.61 km^{2}) | 806.27/sq mi (311.30/km^{2}) | 5,481 | 5,802 | −5.53% |
| 144 | Princeton | Mille Lacs | Sherburne | 4.997 square miles (12.94 km^{2}) | 1,096.7/sq mi (423.4/km^{2}) | 5,480 | 4,819 | +13.72% |
| 145 | Becker | Sherburne | | 11.669 square miles (30.22 km^{2}) | 464.91/sq mi (179.502/km^{2}) | 5,425 | 4,877 | +11.24% |
| 146 | St. Paul Park | Washington | | 2.998 square miles (7.76 km^{2}) | 1,799.9/sq mi (694.93/km^{2}) | 5,396 | 5,544 | −2.67% |
| 147 | Montevideo | Chippewa | | 4.712 square miles (12.20 km^{2}) | 1,132.22/sq mi (437.15/km^{2}) | 5,335 | 5,398 | −1.17% |
| 148 | Lake City | Wabasha | Goodhue | 4.488 square miles (11.62 km^{2}) | 1,182.26/sq mi (456.47/km^{2}) | 5,306 | 5,252 | +1.03% |
| 149 | Elko New Market | Scott | | 3.772 square miles (9.77 km^{2}) | 1,405/sq mi (543/km^{2}) | 5,300 | 4,846 | +9.37% |
| 150 | North Oaks | Ramsey | | 6.910 square miles (17.90 km^{2}) | 764.54/sq mi (295.19/km^{2}) | 5,283 | 5,272 | +0.21% |
| 151 | La Crescent | Houston | Winona | 3.372 square miles (8.73 km^{2}) | 1,560.2/sq mi (602.40/km^{2}) | 5,261 | 5,276 | −0.28% |
| 152 | Morris | Stevens | | 4.699 square miles (12.17 km^{2}) | 1,096.0/sq mi (423.2/km^{2}) | 5,150 | 5,105 | +0.88% |
| 153 | Lonsdale | Rice | | 2.611 square miles (6.76 km^{2}) | 1,959.8/sq mi (756.68/km^{2}) | 5,117 | 4,686 | +9.20% |
| 154 | Falcon Heights | Ramsey | | 2.233 square miles (5.78 km^{2}) | 2,270.9/sq mi (876.81/km^{2}) | 5,071 | 5,369 | −5.55% |
| 155 | Redwood Falls | Redwood | Renville | 5.281 square miles (13.68 km^{2}) | 954.4/sq mi (368.5/km^{2}) | 5,040 | 5,102 | −1.22% |
| 156 | Lindstrom | Chisago | | 3.818 square miles (9.89 km^{2}) | 1,319.80/sq mi (509.58/km^{2}) | 5,039 | 4,888 | +3.09% |
| 157 | Luverne | Rock | | 3.666 square miles (9.49 km^{2}) | 1,359.5/sq mi (524.91/km^{2}) | 4,984 | 4,946 | +0.77% |
| 158 | Circle Pines | Anoka | | 1.748 square miles (4.53 km^{2}) | 2,841.5/sq mi (1,097.1/km^{2}) | 4,967 | 5,025 | −1.15% |
| 159 | St. James | Watonwan | | 2.445 square miles (6.33 km^{2}) | 1,989.0/sq mi (767.94/km^{2}) | 4,863 | 4,793 | +1.46% |
| 160 | Rockford | Wright | Hennepin | 2.526 square miles (6.54 km^{2}) | 1,910.9/sq mi (737.81/km^{2}) | 4,827 | 4,500 | +7.27% |
| 161 | Dilworth | Clay | | 3.461 square miles (8.96 km^{2}) | 1,393.5/sq mi (538.04/km^{2}) | 4,823 | 4,612 | +4.58% |
| 162 | Windom | Cottonwood | | 4.149 square miles (10.75 km^{2}) | 1,161.00/sq mi (448.27/km^{2}) | 4,817 | 4,798 | +0.40% |
| 163 | Watertown | Carver | | 2.626 square miles (6.80 km^{2}) | 1,823.7/sq mi (704.13/km^{2}) | 4,789 | 4,659 | +2.79% |
| 164 | Sauk Centre | Stearns | | 4.102 square miles (10.62 km^{2}) | 1,136.76/sq mi (438.91/km^{2}) | 4,663 | 4,555 | +2.37% |
| 165 | Nowthen | Anoka | | 33.664 square miles (87.19 km^{2}) | 137.54/sq mi (53.10/km^{2}) | 4,630 | 4,536 | +2.07% |
| 166 | Chisholm | St. Louis | | 4.469 square miles (11.57 km^{2}) | 1,034.91/sq mi (399.58/km^{2}) | 4,625 | 4,775 | −3.14% |
| 167 | Oak Park Heights | Washington | | 2.926 square miles (7.58 km^{2}) | 1,580.7/sq mi (610.29/km^{2}) | 4,625 | 4,849 | −4.62% |
| 168 | Park Rapids | Hubbard | | 7.400 square miles (19.17 km^{2}) | 600.95/sq mi (232.03/km^{2}) | 4,447 | 4,142 | +7.36% |
| 169 | Hanover | Wright | Hennepin | 5.486 square miles (14.21 km^{2}) | 800.58/sq mi (309.11/km^{2}) | 4,392 | 3,548 | +23.79% |
| 170 | Stacy | Chisago | | 28.509 square miles (73.84 km^{2}) | 153.180/sq mi (59.143/km^{2}) | 4,367 | 1,703 | +156.43% |
| 171 | Columbus | Anoka | | 44.849 square miles (116.16 km^{2}) | 97.126/sq mi (37.501/km^{2}) | 4,356 | 4,159 | +4.74% |
| 172 | Wayzata | Hennepin | | 3.091 square miles (8.01 km^{2}) | 1,405.4/sq mi (542.62/km^{2}) | 4,344 | 4,434 | −2.03% |
| 173 | Wadena | Wadena | Otter Tail | 5.532 square miles (14.33 km^{2}) | 784.71/sq mi (302.98/km^{2}) | 4,341 | 4,325 | +0.37% |
| 174 | Cold Spring | Stearns | | 2.804 square miles (7.26 km^{2}) | 1,543.9/sq mi (596.09/km^{2}) | 4,329 | 4,164 | +3.96% |
| 175 | Le Sueur | Le Sueur | Nicollet, Sibley | 5.191 square miles (13.44 km^{2}) | 811.0/sq mi (313.1/km^{2}) | 4,210 | 4,213 | −0.07% |
| 176 | Cannon Falls | Goodhue | | 4.592 square miles (11.89 km^{2}) | 916.59/sq mi (353.90/km^{2}) | 4,209 | 4,220 | −0.26% |
| 177 | Rice Lake | St. Louis | | 32.726 square miles (84.76 km^{2}) | 127.391/sq mi (49.186/km^{2}) | 4,169 | 4,112 | +1.39% |
| 178 | Goodview | Winona | | 2.201 square miles (5.70 km^{2}) | 1,872.8/sq mi (723.09/km^{2}) | 4,122 | 4,158 | −0.87% |
| 179 | Pipestone | Pipestone | | 4.146 square miles (10.74 km^{2}) | 989/sq mi (382/km^{2}) | 4,100 | 4,215 | −2.73% |
| 180 | St. Charles | Winona | | 3.748 square miles (9.71 km^{2}) | 1,091.2/sq mi (421.3/km^{2}) | 4,090 | 3,990 | +2.51% |
| 181 | Zumbrota | Goodhue | | 3.028 square miles (7.84 km^{2}) | 1,344.8/sq mi (519.22/km^{2}) | 4,072 | 3,726 | +9.29% |
| 182 | Montrose | Wright | | 3.078 square miles (7.97 km^{2}) | 1,295.0/sq mi (500.00/km^{2}) | 3,986 | 3,775 | +5.59% |
| 183 | Scandia | Washington | | 34.854 square miles (90.27 km^{2}) | 114.162/sq mi (44.078/km^{2}) | 3,979 | 3,984 | −0.13% |
| 184 | Centerville | Anoka | | 2.125 square miles (5.50 km^{2}) | 1,872.0/sq mi (722.78/km^{2}) | 3,978 | 3,896 | +2.10% |
| 185 | Grant | Washington | | 25.082 square miles (64.96 km^{2}) | 157.643/sq mi (60.866/km^{2}) | 3,954 | 3,966 | −0.30% |
| 186 | Pine Island | Goodhue | Olmsted | 6.204 square miles (16.07 km^{2}) | 630.40/sq mi (243.40/km^{2}) | 3,911 | 3,769 | +3.77% |
| 187 | Melrose | Stearns | | 3.174 square miles (8.22 km^{2}) | 1,225.0/sq mi (472.96/km^{2}) | 3,888 | 3,602 | +7.94% |
| 188 | Long Prairie | Todd | | 2.746 square miles (7.11 km^{2}) | 1,394.8/sq mi (538.5/km^{2}) | 3,830 | 3,661 | +4.62% |
| 189 | Pine City | Pine | | 4.388 square miles (11.36 km^{2}) | 870.6/sq mi (336.1/km^{2}) | 3,820 | 3,130 | +22.04% |
| 190 | Annandale | Wright | | 3.202 square miles (8.29 km^{2}) | 1,187.1/sq mi (458.33/km^{2}) | 3,801 | 3,330 | +14.14% |
| 191 | St. Augusta | Stearns | | 29.685 square miles (76.88 km^{2}) | 127.977/sq mi (49.412/km^{2}) | 3,799 | 3,497 | +8.64% |
| 192 | Deephaven | Hennepin | | 2.327 square miles (6.03 km^{2}) | 1,630.4/sq mi (629.51/km^{2}) | 3,794 | 3,899 | −2.69% |
| 193 | Norwood Young America | Carver | | 2.464 square miles (6.38 km^{2}) | 1,532.9/sq mi (591.85/km^{2}) | 3,777 | 3,863 | −2.23% |
| 194 | Independence | Hennepin | | 32.431 square miles (84.00 km^{2}) | 116.031/sq mi (44.800/km^{2}) | 3,763 | 3,755 | +0.21% |
| 195 | Mora | Kanabec | | 5.164 square miles (13.37 km^{2}) | 728.70/sq mi (281.35/km^{2}) | 3,763 | 3,665 | +2.67% |
| 196 | Perham | Otter Tail | | 3.577 square miles (9.26 km^{2}) | 1,047.25/sq mi (404.34/km^{2}) | 3,746 | 3,512 | +6.66% |
| 197 | Bayport | Washington | | 1.733 square miles (4.49 km^{2}) | 2,147.1/sq mi (829.0/km^{2}) | 3,721 | 4,024 | −7.53% |
| 198 | Montgomery | Le Sueur | | 2.514 square miles (6.51 km^{2}) | 1,407.7/sq mi (543.52/km^{2}) | 3,539 | 3,249 | +8.93% |
| 199 | Plainview | Wabasha | | 2.144 square miles (5.55 km^{2}) | 1,624.1/sq mi (627.06/km^{2}) | 3,482 | 3,483 | −0.03% |
| 200 | Sleepy Eye | Brown | | 1.871 square miles (4.85 km^{2}) | 1,849.8/sq mi (714.22/km^{2}) | 3,461 | 3,452 | +0.26% |
| 201 | Benson | Swift | | 3.181 square miles (8.24 km^{2}) | 1,082.7/sq mi (418.02/km^{2}) | 3,444 | 3,480 | −1.03% |
| 202 | Two Harbors | Lake | | 3.273 square miles (8.48 km^{2}) | 1,051.94/sq mi (406.16/km^{2}) | 3,443 | 3,633 | −5.23% |
| 203 | Eveleth | St. Louis | | 6.304 square miles (16.33 km^{2}) | 536.33/sq mi (207.08/km^{2}) | 3,381 | 3,493 | −3.21% |
| 204 | Eagle Lake | Blue Earth | | 1.925 square miles (4.99 km^{2}) | 1,743.9/sq mi (673.32/km^{2}) | 3,357 | 3,278 | +2.41% |
| 205 | Breckenridge | Wilkin | | 2.596 square miles (6.72 km^{2}) | 1,280.0/sq mi (494.23/km^{2}) | 3,323 | 3,430 | −3.12% |
| 206 | Jackson | Jackson | | 5.191 square miles (13.44 km^{2}) | 636.68/sq mi (245.82/km^{2}) | 3,305 | 3,323 | −0.54% |
| 207 | Rush City | Chisago | | 4.250 square miles (11.01 km^{2}) | 776/sq mi (300/km^{2}) | 3,300 | 3,228 | +2.23% |
| 208 | Ely | St. Louis | | 2.925 square miles (7.58 km^{2}) | 1,104.6/sq mi (426.49/km^{2}) | 3,231 | 3,268 | −1.13% |
| 209 | Blue Earth | Faribault | | 3.318 square miles (8.59 km^{2}) | 953.89/sq mi (368.30/km^{2}) | 3,165 | 3,174 | −0.28% |
| 210 | Lexington | Anoka | | 0.689 square miles (1.78 km^{2}) | 4,472/sq mi (1,726.5/km^{2}) | 3,081 | 2,248 | +37.06% |
| 211 | Staples | Todd | Wadena | 4.761 square miles (12.33 km^{2}) | 645.66/sq mi (249.29/km^{2}) | 3,074 | 2,989 | +2.84% |
| 212 | Empire | Dakota | | 30.533 square miles (79.08 km^{2}) | 100.318/sq mi (38.733/km^{2}) | 3,063 | 3,177 | −3.59% |
| 213 | Proctor | St. Louis | | 3.361 square miles (8.70 km^{2}) | 908.66/sq mi (350.83/km^{2}) | 3,054 | 3,120 | −2.12% |
| 214 | Milaca | Mille Lacs | | 3.407 square miles (8.82 km^{2}) | 892.57/sq mi (344.62/km^{2}) | 3,041 | 3,021 | +0.66% |
| 215 | Chatfield | Fillmore | Olmsted | 2.589 square miles (6.71 km^{2}) | 1,165.7/sq mi (450.08/km^{2}) | 3,018 | 2,997 | +0.70% |
| 216 | Greenfield | Hennepin | | 20.373 square miles (52.77 km^{2}) | 145.389/sq mi (56.135/km^{2}) | 2,962 | 2,903 | +2.03% |
| 217 | Afton | Washington | | 25.092 square miles (64.99 km^{2}) | 117.97/sq mi (45.55/km^{2}) | 2,960 | 2,955 | +0.17% |
| 218 | Dodge Center | Dodge | | 2.412 square miles (6.25 km^{2}) | 1,223.5/sq mi (472.38/km^{2}) | 2,951 | 2,844 | +3.76% |
| 219 | Moose Lake | Carlton | | 3.280 square miles (8.50 km^{2}) | 898.78/sq mi (347.02/km^{2}) | 2,948 | 2,789 | +5.70% |
| 220 | Albany | Stearns | | 2.176 square miles (5.64 km^{2}) | 1,320.3/sq mi (509.78/km^{2}) | 2,873 | 2,780 | +3.35% |
| 221 | Mountain Iron | St. Louis | | 68.107 square miles (176.40 km^{2}) | 41.626/sq mi (16.0718/km^{2}) | 2,835 | 2,878 | −1.49% |
| 222 | Cokato | Wright | | 1.555 square miles (4.03 km^{2}) | 1,796.1/sq mi (693.5/km^{2}) | 2,793 | 2,799 | −0.21% |
| 223 | Breezy Point | Crow Wing | | 11.727 square miles (30.37 km^{2}) | 236.29/sq mi (91.233/km^{2}) | 2,771 | 2,574 | +7.65% |
| 224 | Caledonia | Houston | | 2.824 square miles (7.31 km^{2}) | 980.2/sq mi (378.45/km^{2}) | 2,768 | 2,847 | −2.77% |
| 225 | Barnesville | Clay | | 2.001 square miles (5.18 km^{2}) | 1,382.8/sq mi (533.91/km^{2}) | 2,767 | 2,759 | +0.29% |
| 226 | Cohasset | Itasca | | 27.664 square miles (71.65 km^{2}) | 98.612/sq mi (38.074/km^{2}) | 2,728 | 2,689 | +1.45% |
| 227 | Granite Falls | Yellow Medicine | Chippewa | 3.546 square miles (9.18 km^{2}) | 758.88/sq mi (293.01/km^{2}) | 2,691 | 2,737 | −1.68% |
| 228 | Roseau | Roseau | | 2.686 square miles (6.96 km^{2}) | 999.6/sq mi (385.96/km^{2}) | 2,685 | 2,744 | −2.15% |
| 229 | Foley | Benton | | 2.614 square miles (6.77 km^{2}) | 1,013.8/sq mi (391.4/km^{2}) | 2,650 | 2,711 | −2.25% |
| 230 | Glenwood | Pope | | 5.720 square miles (14.81 km^{2}) | 459.97/sq mi (177.59/km^{2}) | 2,631 | 2,657 | −0.98% |
| 231 | Pelican Rapids | Otter Tail | | 2.584 square miles (6.69 km^{2}) | 1,009.3/sq mi (389.69/km^{2}) | 2,608 | 2,577 | +1.20% |
| 232 | Wabasha | Wabasha | | 8.191 square miles (21.21 km^{2}) | 317.30/sq mi (122.510/km^{2}) | 2,599 | 2,559 | +1.56% |
| 233 | Paynesville | Stearns | | 2.290 square miles (5.93 km^{2}) | 1,131.4/sq mi (436.85/km^{2}) | 2,591 | 2,388 | +8.50% |
| 234 | Mayer | Carver | | 1.374 square miles (3.56 km^{2}) | 1,865.4/sq mi (720.2/km^{2}) | 2,563 | 2,453 | +4.48% |
| 235 | Sandstone | Pine | | 5.262 square miles (13.63 km^{2}) | 483.28/sq mi (186.59/km^{2}) | 2,543 | 2,462 | +3.29% |
| 236 | Osseo | Hennepin | | 0.742 square miles (1.92 km^{2}) | 3,415.1/sq mi (1,318.6/km^{2}) | 2,534 | 2,688 | −5.73% |
| 237 | Le Center | Le Sueur | | 1.676 square miles (4.34 km^{2}) | 1,506.0/sq mi (581.46/km^{2}) | 2,524 | 2,517 | +0.28% |
| 238 | Rockville | Stearns | | 28.682 square miles (74.29 km^{2}) | 86.884/sq mi (33.546/km^{2}) | 2,492 | 2,382 | +4.62% |
| 239 | Madelia | Watonwan | | 1.512 square miles (3.92 km^{2}) | 1,645.5/sq mi (635.3/km^{2}) | 2,488 | 2,396 | +3.84% |
| 240 | Pequot Lakes | Crow Wing | | 16.375 square miles (42.41 km^{2}) | 151.63/sq mi (58.546/km^{2}) | 2,483 | 2,395 | +3.67% |
| 241 | Janesville | Waseca | | 1.537 square miles (3.98 km^{2}) | 1,609.0/sq mi (621.2/km^{2}) | 2,473 | 2,421 | +2.15% |
| 242 | Lake Crystal | Blue Earth | | 1.707 square miles (4.42 km^{2}) | 1,447/sq mi (558.7/km^{2}) | 2,470 | 2,539 | −2.72% |
| 243 | Spring Valley | Fillmore | | 2.958 square miles (7.66 km^{2}) | 821.84/sq mi (317.31/km^{2}) | 2,431 | 2,447 | −0.65% |
| 244 | Crosslake | Crow Wing | | 25.772 square miles (66.75 km^{2}) | 93.590/sq mi (36.135/km^{2}) | 2,412 | 2,394 | +0.75% |
| 245 | Wells | Faribault | | 2.087 square miles (5.41 km^{2}) | 1,147.6/sq mi (443.08/km^{2}) | 2,395 | 2,410 | −0.62% |
| 246 | Gaylord | Sibley | | 1.887 square miles (4.89 km^{2}) | 1,247.0/sq mi (481.45/km^{2}) | 2,353 | 2,273 | +3.52% |
| 247 | Arlington | Sibley | | 1.609 square miles (4.17 km^{2}) | 1,454/sq mi (561.5/km^{2}) | 2,340 | 2,247 | +4.14% |
| 248 | Crosby | Crow Wing | | 2.955 square miles (7.65 km^{2}) | 788.5/sq mi (304.4/km^{2}) | 2,330 | 2,360 | −1.27% |
| 249 | Lauderdale | Ramsey | | 0.419 square miles (1.09 km^{2}) | 5,556/sq mi (2,145.2/km^{2}) | 2,328 | 2,271 | +2.51% |
| 250 | Excelsior | Hennepin | | 0.629 square miles (1.63 km^{2}) | 3,682/sq mi (1,421.6/km^{2}) | 2,316 | 2,355 | −1.66% |
| 251 | Waverly | Wright | | 1.657 square miles (4.29 km^{2}) | 1,383.8/sq mi (534.30/km^{2}) | 2,293 | 1,900 | +20.68% |
| 252 | Howard Lake | Wright | | 1.852 square miles (4.80 km^{2}) | 1,235.4/sq mi (477.00/km^{2}) | 2,288 | 2,071 | +10.48% |
| 253 | Olivia | Renville | | 2.421 square miles (6.27 km^{2}) | 945.1/sq mi (364.89/km^{2}) | 2,288 | 2,343 | −2.35% |
| 254 | Hawley | Clay | | 2.620 square miles (6.79 km^{2}) | 872.1/sq mi (336.73/km^{2}) | 2,285 | 2,219 | +2.97% |
| 255 | Clearwater | Wright | Stearns | 1.787 square miles (4.63 km^{2}) | 1,245.1/sq mi (480.74/km^{2}) | 2,225 | 1,922 | +15.76% |
| 256 | Nisswa | Crow Wing | | 10.771 square miles (27.90 km^{2}) | 205.83/sq mi (79.472/km^{2}) | 2,217 | 1,967 | +12.71% |
| 257 | Maple Lake | Wright | | 2.208 square miles (5.72 km^{2}) | 1,003.6/sq mi (387.50/km^{2}) | 2,216 | 2,159 | +2.64% |
| 258 | Rice | Benton | | 5.702 square miles (14.77 km^{2}) | 387.93/sq mi (149.78/km^{2}) | 2,212 | 1,975 | +12.00% |
| 259 | Winsted | McLeod | | 1.898 square miles (4.92 km^{2}) | 1,163.9/sq mi (449.37/km^{2}) | 2,209 | 2,240 | −1.38% |
| 260 | St. Bonifacius | Hennepin | | 1.039 square miles (2.69 km^{2}) | 2,089.5/sq mi (806.8/km^{2}) | 2,171 | 2,307 | −5.90% |
| 261 | Aitkin | Aitkin | | 2.961 square miles (7.67 km^{2}) | 727.79/sq mi (281.00/km^{2}) | 2,155 | 2,168 | −0.60% |
| 262 | Cologne | Carver | | 1.788 square miles (4.63 km^{2}) | 1,196.3/sq mi (461.90/km^{2}) | 2,139 | 2,047 | +4.49% |
| 263 | Oronoco | Olmsted | | 2.932 square miles (7.59 km^{2}) | 696.79/sq mi (269.03/km^{2}) | 2,043 | 1,802 | +13.37% |
| 264 | Tracy | Lyon | | 2.396 square miles (6.21 km^{2}) | 851.0/sq mi (328.57/km^{2}) | 2,039 | 2,076 | −1.78% |
| 265 | Eyota | Olmsted | | 1.688 square miles (4.37 km^{2}) | 1,192.5/sq mi (460.44/km^{2}) | 2,013 | 2,006 | +0.35% |
| 266 | Coleraine | Itasca | | 15.422 square miles (39.94 km^{2}) | 129.56/sq mi (50.022/km^{2}) | 1,998 | 2,006 | −0.40% |
| 267 | Hinckley | Pine | | 3.786 square miles (9.81 km^{2}) | 526.15/sq mi (203.15/km^{2}) | 1,992 | 1,904 | +4.62% |
| 268 | Springfield | Brown | | 1.877 square miles (4.86 km^{2}) | 1,054.9/sq mi (407.3/km^{2}) | 1,980 | 2,027 | −2.32% |
| 269 | Hoyt Lakes | St. Louis | | 55.912 square miles (144.81 km^{2}) | 35.377/sq mi (13.659/km^{2}) | 1,978 | 2,020 | −2.08% |
| 270 | Warroad | Roseau | | 3.273 square miles (8.48 km^{2}) | 603.73/sq mi (233.10/km^{2}) | 1,976 | 1,830 | +7.98% |
| 271 | Ortonville | Big Stone | | 4.193 square miles (10.86 km^{2}) | 469.12/sq mi (181.13/km^{2}) | 1,967 | 2,021 | −2.67% |
| 272 | Mountain Lake | Cottonwood | | 1.717 square miles (4.45 km^{2}) | 1,135.1/sq mi (438.27/km^{2}) | 1,949 | 1,999 | −2.50% |
| 273 | Long Lake | Hennepin | | 0.856 square miles (2.22 km^{2}) | 2,271.0/sq mi (876.8/km^{2}) | 1,944 | 1,741 | +11.66% |
| 274 | Blooming Prairie | Steele | Dodge | 1.364 square miles (3.53 km^{2}) | 1,418.6/sq mi (547.7/km^{2}) | 1,935 | 1,974 | −1.98% |
| 275 | Slayton | Murray | | 2.059 square miles (5.33 km^{2}) | 937.3/sq mi (361.9/km^{2}) | 1,930 | 2,013 | −4.12% |
| 276 | Kenyon | Goodhue | | 2.309 square miles (5.98 km^{2}) | 816.4/sq mi (315.20/km^{2}) | 1,885 | 1,894 | −0.48% |
| 277 | Lester Prairie | McLeod | | 1.003 square miles (2.60 km^{2}) | 1,875.4/sq mi (724.1/km^{2}) | 1,881 | 1,894 | −0.69% |
| 278 | Rushford | Fillmore | | 1.650 square miles (4.27 km^{2}) | 1,120.6/sq mi (432.67/km^{2}) | 1,849 | 1,860 | −0.59% |
| 279 | Dundas | Rice | | 1.847 square miles (4.78 km^{2}) | 992.4/sq mi (383.18/km^{2}) | 1,833 | 1,712 | +7.07% |
| 280 | Braham | Isanti | Kanabec | 1.625 square miles (4.21 km^{2}) | 1,100.9/sq mi (425.07/km^{2}) | 1,789 | 1,769 | +1.13% |
| 281 | Avon | Stearns | | 1.702 square miles (4.41 km^{2}) | 1,044.1/sq mi (403.12/km^{2}) | 1,777 | 1,618 | +9.83% |
| 282 | Rock Creek | Pine | | 43.013 square miles (111.40 km^{2}) | 41.197/sq mi (15.906/km^{2}) | 1,772 | 1,682 | +5.35% |
| 283 | Silver Bay | Lake | | 7.628 square miles (19.76 km^{2}) | 231.65/sq mi (89.439/km^{2}) | 1,767 | 1,857 | −4.85% |
| 284 | Waterville | Le Sueur | | 1.690 square miles (4.38 km^{2}) | 1,039.6/sq mi (401.41/km^{2}) | 1,757 | 1,750 | +0.40% |
| 285 | Osakis | Douglas | Todd | 1.921 square miles (4.98 km^{2}) | 905.3/sq mi (349.52/km^{2}) | 1,739 | 1,771 | −1.81% |
| 286 | Ada | Norman | | 1.341 square miles (3.47 km^{2}) | 1,276.7/sq mi (492.9/km^{2}) | 1,712 | 1,740 | −1.61% |
| 287 | Lakefield | Jackson | | 1.338 square miles (3.47 km^{2}) | 1,268.3/sq mi (489.7/km^{2}) | 1,697 | 1,735 | −2.19% |
| 288 | Canby | Yellow Medicine | | 2.239 square miles (5.80 km^{2}) | 747.7/sq mi (288.67/km^{2}) | 1,674 | 1,695 | −1.24% |
| 289 | Lakeland | Washington | | 2.075 square miles (5.37 km^{2}) | 799.5/sq mi (308.70/km^{2}) | 1,659 | 1,710 | −2.98% |
| 290 | Maple Plain | Hennepin | | 1.065 square miles (2.76 km^{2}) | 1,552.1/sq mi (599.3/km^{2}) | 1,653 | 1,743 | −5.16% |
| 291 | Spring Park | Hennepin | | 0.353 square miles (0.91 km^{2}) | 4,666/sq mi (1,801.4/km^{2}) | 1,647 | 1,734 | −5.02% |
| 292 | Gilbert | St. Louis | | 11.678 square miles (30.25 km^{2}) | 140.78/sq mi (54.355/km^{2}) | 1,644 | 1,687 | −2.55% |
| 293 | Aurora | St. Louis | | 3.697 square miles (9.58 km^{2}) | 444.41/sq mi (171.59/km^{2}) | 1,643 | 1,678 | −2.09% |
| 294 | Mapleton | Blue Earth | | 1.367 square miles (3.54 km^{2}) | 1,186.5/sq mi (458.13/km^{2}) | 1,622 | 1,710 | −5.15% |
| 295 | Tonka Bay | Hennepin | | 0.939 square miles (2.43 km^{2}) | 1,662.4/sq mi (641.9/km^{2}) | 1,561 | 1,442 | +8.25% |
| 296 | Warren | Marshall | | 1.456 square miles (3.77 km^{2}) | 1,070.1/sq mi (413.15/km^{2}) | 1,558 | 1,605 | −2.93% |
| 297 | Dassel | Meeker | | 1.683 square miles (4.36 km^{2}) | 905.5/sq mi (349.63/km^{2}) | 1,524 | 1,472 | +3.53% |
| 298 | Richmond | Stearns | | 1.192 square miles (3.09 km^{2}) | 1,271.0/sq mi (490.7/km^{2}) | 1,515 | 1,475 | +2.71% |
| 299 | Lewiston | Winona | | 1.268 square miles (3.28 km^{2}) | 1,194.0/sq mi (461.0/km^{2}) | 1,514 | 1,533 | −1.24% |
| 300 | Madison | Lac qui Parle | | 1.151 square miles (2.98 km^{2}) | 1,306.7/sq mi (504.5/km^{2}) | 1,504 | 1,518 | −0.92% |
| 301 | New York Mills | Otter Tail | | 1.510 square miles (3.91 km^{2}) | 980.8/sq mi (378.69/km^{2}) | 1,481 | 1,294 | +14.45% |
| 302 | Pierz | Morrison | | 1.379 square miles (3.57 km^{2}) | 1,051/sq mi (406.0/km^{2}) | 1,450 | 1,418 | +2.26% |
| 303 | Dawson | Lac qui Parle | | 1.438 square miles (3.72 km^{2}) | 1,004.2/sq mi (387.71/km^{2}) | 1,444 | 1,466 | −1.50% |
| 304 | Starbuck | Pope | | 1.480 square miles (3.83 km^{2}) | 950.0/sq mi (366.80/km^{2}) | 1,406 | 1,365 | +3.00% |
| 305 | Clara City | Chippewa | | 1.880 square miles (4.87 km^{2}) | 743.1/sq mi (286.91/km^{2}) | 1,397 | 1,423 | −1.83% |
| 306 | Glyndon | Clay | | 1.582 square miles (4.10 km^{2}) | 880.5/sq mi (339.97/km^{2}) | 1,393 | 1,306 | +6.66% |
| 307 | Fosston | Polk | | 2.012 square miles (5.21 km^{2}) | 687.4/sq mi (265.40/km^{2}) | 1,383 | 1,434 | −3.56% |
| 308 | Winnebago | Faribault | | 2.337 square miles (6.05 km^{2}) | 591.8/sq mi (228.49/km^{2}) | 1,383 | 1,391 | −0.58% |
| 309 | Medford | Steele | | 1.194 square miles (3.09 km^{2}) | 1,153.3/sq mi (445.3/km^{2}) | 1,377 | 1,315 | +4.71% |
| 310 | Babbitt | St. Louis | | 105.951 square miles (274.41 km^{2}) | 12.864/sq mi (4.9670/km^{2}) | 1,363 | 1,397 | −2.43% |
| 311 | Appleton | Swift | | 1.889 square miles (4.89 km^{2}) | 720.5/sq mi (278.18/km^{2}) | 1,361 | 1,392 | −2.23% |
| 312 | Menahga | Wadena | | 3.709 square miles (9.61 km^{2}) | 366.95/sq mi (141.68/km^{2}) | 1,361 | 1,340 | +1.57% |
| 313 | Hayfield | Dodge | | 1.252 square miles (3.24 km^{2}) | 1,084.7/sq mi (418.8/km^{2}) | 1,358 | 1,364 | −0.44% |
| 314 | Minneota | Lyon | | 1.451 square miles (3.76 km^{2}) | 935.2/sq mi (361.09/km^{2}) | 1,357 | 1,366 | −0.66% |
| 315 | Red Lake Falls | Red Lake | | 2.100 square miles (5.44 km^{2}) | 641.9/sq mi (247.84/km^{2}) | 1,348 | 1,339 | +0.67% |
| 316 | Medicine Lake | Hennepin | | 0.173 square miles (0.45 km^{2}) | 7,757/sq mi (2,995/km^{2}) | 1,342 | 337 | +298.22% |
| 317 | Winthrop | Sibley | | 1.275 square miles (3.30 km^{2}) | 1,051.8/sq mi (406.09/km^{2}) | 1,341 | 1,332 | +0.68% |
| 318 | Wheaton | Traverse | | 1.737 square miles (4.50 km^{2}) | 765.7/sq mi (295.6/km^{2}) | 1,330 | 1,460 | −8.90% |
| 319 | New London | Kandiyohi | | 1.293 square miles (3.35 km^{2}) | 1,022.4/sq mi (394.76/km^{2}) | 1,322 | 1,252 | +5.59% |
| 320 | Preston | Fillmore | | 2.465 square miles (6.38 km^{2}) | 534.69/sq mi (206.44/km^{2}) | 1,318 | 1,322 | −0.30% |
| 321 | Madison Lake | Blue Earth | | 1.372 square miles (3.55 km^{2}) | 958.5/sq mi (370.06/km^{2}) | 1,315 | 1,247 | +5.45% |
| 322 | Bagley | Clearwater | | 2.148 square miles (5.56 km^{2}) | 609.9/sq mi (235.5/km^{2}) | 1,310 | 1,285 | +1.95% |
| 323 | Frazee | Becker | | 1.074 square miles (2.78 km^{2}) | 1,220/sq mi (470.9/km^{2}) | 1,310 | 1,335 | −1.87% |
| 324 | Fulda | Murray | | 1.012 square miles (2.62 km^{2}) | 1,287.5/sq mi (497.1/km^{2}) | 1,303 | 1,371 | −4.96% |
| 325 | Grand Marais | Cook | | 2.909 square miles (7.53 km^{2}) | 443.5/sq mi (171.2/km^{2}) | 1,290 | 1,337 | −3.52% |
| 326 | Royalton | Morrison | Benton | 2.006 square miles (5.20 km^{2}) | 635.1/sq mi (245.21/km^{2}) | 1,274 | 1,281 | −0.55% |
| 327 | Elbow Lake | Grant | | 1.384 square miles (3.58 km^{2}) | 922.0/sq mi (355.97/km^{2}) | 1,276 | 1,276 | 0.00% |
| 328 | Renville | Renville | | 1.321 square miles (3.42 km^{2}) | 959.9/sq mi (370.61/km^{2}) | 1,268 | 1,301 | −2.54% |
| 329 | Edgerton | Pipestone | | 1.176 square miles (3.05 km^{2}) | 1,068.0/sq mi (412.4/km^{2}) | 1,256 | 1,258 | −0.16% |
| 330 | Goodhue | Goodhue | | 1.100 square miles (2.85 km^{2}) | 1,133.6/sq mi (437.7/km^{2}) | 1,247 | 1,250 | −0.24% |
| 331 | Adrian | Nobles | | 1.169 square miles (3.03 km^{2}) | 1,042.8/sq mi (402.6/km^{2}) | 1,219 | 1,194 | +2.09% |
| 332 | Shafer | Chisago | | 1.270 square miles (3.29 km^{2}) | 954.3/sq mi (368.47/km^{2}) | 1,212 | 1,142 | +6.13% |
| 333 | Spring Grove | Houston | | 0.994 square miles (2.57 km^{2}) | 1,213.3/sq mi (468.4/km^{2}) | 1,206 | 1,256 | −3.98% |
| 334 | Fairfax | Renville | | 1.310 square miles (3.39 km^{2}) | 918.3/sq mi (354.57/km^{2}) | 1,203 | 1,250 | −3.76% |
| 335 | New Richland | Waseca | | 0.591 square miles (1.53 km^{2}) | 2,020.3/sq mi (780.0/km^{2}) | 1,194 | 1,229 | −2.85% |
| 336 | East Gull Lake | Cass | | 7.882 square miles (20.41 km^{2}) | 150.22/sq mi (57.999/km^{2}) | 1,184 | 986 | +20.08% |
| 337 | Mahnomen | Mahnomen | | 1.059 square miles (2.74 km^{2}) | 1,115.2/sq mi (430.6/km^{2}) | 1,181 | 1,240 | −4.76% |
| 338 | Grand Meadow | Mower | | 0.687 square miles (1.78 km^{2}) | 1,687.0/sq mi (651.4/km^{2}) | 1,159 | 1,127 | +2.84% |
| 339 | Dellwood | Washington | | 2.663 square miles (6.90 km^{2}) | 431.09/sq mi (166.45/km^{2}) | 1,148 | 1,171 | −1.96% |
| 340 | Harris | Chisago | | 19.961 square miles (51.70 km^{2}) | 57.061/sq mi (22.031/km^{2}) | 1,139 | 1,111 | +2.52% |
| 341 | Cottonwood | Lyon | | 1.002 square miles (2.60 km^{2}) | 1,135.7/sq mi (438.5/km^{2}) | 1,138 | 1,149 | −0.96% |
| 342 | Elgin | Wabasha | | 0.929 square miles (2.41 km^{2}) | 1,223.9/sq mi (472.5/km^{2}) | 1,137 | 1,115 | +1.97% |
| 343 | Lake Shore | Cass | | 12.687 square miles (32.86 km^{2}) | 88.83/sq mi (34.298/km^{2}) | 1,127 | 1,056 | +6.72% |
| 344 | Nicollet | Nicollet | | 0.907 square miles (2.35 km^{2}) | 1,242.6/sq mi (479.8/km^{2}) | 1,127 | 1,143 | −1.40% |
| 345 | Tyler | Lincoln | | 2.101 square miles (5.44 km^{2}) | 529.3/sq mi (204.35/km^{2}) | 1,112 | 1,138 | −2.28% |
| 346 | Wanamingo | Goodhue | | 1.417 square miles (3.67 km^{2}) | 784.1/sq mi (302.72/km^{2}) | 1,111 | 1,113 | −0.18% |
| 347 | Mantorville | Dodge | | 1.562 square miles (4.05 km^{2}) | 708.1/sq mi (273.39/km^{2}) | 1,106 | 1,111 | −0.45% |
| 348 | Spicer | Kandiyohi | | 1.222 square miles (3.16 km^{2}) | 896.9/sq mi (346.29/km^{2}) | 1,096 | 1,112 | −1.44% |
| 349 | Atwater | Kandiyohi | | 1.030 square miles (2.67 km^{2}) | 1,058/sq mi (408.6/km^{2}) | 1,090 | 1,124 | −3.02% |
| 350 | Eden Valley | Meeker | Stearns | 1.338 square miles (3.47 km^{2}) | 793.7/sq mi (306.46/km^{2}) | 1,062 | 1,027 | +3.41% |
| 351 | Truman | Martin | | 1.099 square miles (2.85 km^{2}) | 963.6/sq mi (372.0/km^{2}) | 1,059 | 1,092 | −3.02% |
| 352 | Taylors Falls | Chisago | | 3.985 square miles (10.32 km^{2}) | 264.49/sq mi (102.12/km^{2}) | 1,054 | 1,055 | −0.09% |
| 353 | Sherburn | Martin | | 0.919 square miles (2.38 km^{2}) | 1,132/sq mi (436.9/km^{2}) | 1,040 | 1,058 | −1.70% |
| 354 | Parkers Prairie | Otter Tail | | 1.245 square miles (3.22 km^{2}) | 828.1/sq mi (319.74/km^{2}) | 1,031 | 1,020 | +1.08% |
| 355 | Harmony | Fillmore | | 1.115 square miles (2.89 km^{2}) | 922.0/sq mi (356.0/km^{2}) | 1,028 | 1,043 | −1.44% |
| 356 | Morristown | Rice | | 1.124 square miles (2.91 km^{2}) | 910.1/sq mi (351.4/km^{2}) | 1,023 | 949 | +7.80% |
| 357 | Watkins | Meeker | | 0.688 square miles (1.78 km^{2}) | 1,479.7/sq mi (571.3/km^{2}) | 1,018 | 991 | +2.72% |
| 358 | Lake St. Croix Beach | Washington | | 0.562 square miles (1.46 km^{2}) | 1,788.3/sq mi (690.4/km^{2}) | 1,005 | 1,043 | −3.64% |
| 359 | Henderson | Sibley | | 1.074 square miles (2.78 km^{2}) | 926.4/sq mi (357.7/km^{2}) | 995 | 960 | +3.65% |
| 360 | Hector | Renville | | 1.806 square miles (4.68 km^{2}) | 547.6/sq mi (211.44/km^{2}) | 989 | 1,012 | −2.27% |
| 361 | Scanlon | Carlton | | 0.858 square miles (2.22 km^{2}) | 1,152.7/sq mi (445.1/km^{2}) | 989 | 987 | +0.20% |
| 362 | Bird Island | Renville | | 1.464 square miles (3.79 km^{2}) | 670.1/sq mi (258.72/km^{2}) | 981 | 1,005 | −2.39% |
| 363 | Walker | Cass | | 2.809 square miles (7.28 km^{2}) | 347.45/sq mi (134.15/km^{2}) | 976 | 966 | +1.04% |
| 364 | Biwabik | St. Louis | | 8.760 square miles (22.69 km^{2}) | 110.7/sq mi (42.75/km^{2}) | 970 | 961 | +0.94% |
| 365 | Houston | Houston | | 1.231 square miles (3.19 km^{2}) | 788/sq mi (304.2/km^{2}) | 970 | 997 | −2.71% |
| 366 | Le Roy | Mower | | 0.706 square miles (1.83 km^{2}) | 1,372.5/sq mi (529.9/km^{2}) | 969 | 957 | +1.25% |
| 367 | Carlton | Carlton | | 3.805 square miles (9.85 km^{2}) | 253.61/sq mi (97.92/km^{2}) | 965 | 948 | +1.79% |
| 368 | Keewatin | Itasca | | 2.622 square miles (6.79 km^{2}) | 368.04/sq mi (142.10/km^{2}) | 965 | 984 | −1.93% |
| 369 | Hilltop | Anoka | | 0.119 square miles (0.31 km^{2}) | 8,070/sq mi (3,115/km^{2}) | 960 | 958 | +0.21% |
| 370 | Nashwauk | Itasca | | 15.186 square miles (39.33 km^{2}) | 63.02/sq mi (24.332/km^{2}) | 957 | 970 | −1.34% |
| 371 | Buhl | St. Louis | | 3.307 square miles (8.57 km^{2}) | 286.06/sq mi (110.45/km^{2}) | 946 | 952 | −0.63% |
| 372 | Battle Lake | Otter Tail | | 1.437 square miles (3.72 km^{2}) | 647/sq mi (249.9/km^{2}) | 930 | 857 | +8.52% |
| 373 | Deer River | Itasca | | 1.517 square miles (3.93 km^{2}) | 610.4/sq mi (235.68/km^{2}) | 926 | 909 | +1.87% |
| 374 | Baudette | Lake of the Woods | | 4.234 square miles (10.97 km^{2}) | 218.23/sq mi (84.26/km^{2}) | 924 | 966 | −4.35% |
| 375 | Kimball | Stearns | | 1.512 square miles (3.92 km^{2}) | 611.1/sq mi (235.95/km^{2}) | 924 | 799 | +15.64% |
| 376 | Pine River | Cass | | 1.200 square miles (3.11 km^{2}) | 759.2/sq mi (293.12/km^{2}) | 911 | 911 | 0.00% |
| 377 | Morgan | Redwood | | 0.552 square miles (1.43 km^{2}) | 1,596.0/sq mi (616.2/km^{2}) | 881 | 888 | −0.79% |
| 378 | Clarkfield | Yellow Medicine | | 1.132 square miles (2.93 km^{2}) | 775.6/sq mi (299.47/km^{2}) | 878 | 852 | +3.05% |
| 379 | Mazeppa | Wabasha | | 1.088 square miles (2.82 km^{2}) | 807.0/sq mi (311.6/km^{2}) | 878 | 874 | +0.46% |
| 380 | Emily | Crow Wing | | 29.979 square miles (77.65 km^{2}) | 29.02/sq mi (11.20/km^{2}) | 870 | 843 | +3.20% |
| 381 | Hallock | Kittson | | 2.131 square miles (5.52 km^{2}) | 405.9/sq mi (156.72/km^{2}) | 865 | 906 | −4.53% |
| 382 | Henning | Otter Tail | | 3.303 square miles (8.55 km^{2}) | 260.07/sq mi (100.41/km^{2}) | 859 | 854 | +0.59% |
| 383 | Silver Lake | McLeod | | 0.411 square miles (1.06 km^{2}) | 2,066/sq mi (797.6/km^{2}) | 849 | 866 | −1.96% |
| 384 | Landfall | Washington | | 0.066 square miles (0.17 km^{2}) | 12,830/sq mi (4,950/km^{2}) | 847 | 843 | +0.47% |
| 385 | Hancock | Stevens | | 0.903 square miles (2.34 km^{2}) | 936.9/sq mi (361.7/km^{2}) | 846 | 863 | −1.97% |
| 386 | Birchwood Village | Washington | | 0.334 square miles (0.87 km^{2}) | 2,530/sq mi (976.8/km^{2}) | 845 | 863 | −2.09% |
| 387 | Lilydale | Dakota | | 0.553 square miles (1.43 km^{2}) | 1,528.0/sq mi (590.0/km^{2}) | 845 | 809 | +4.45% |
| 388 | West Concord | Dodge | | 1.075 square miles (2.78 km^{2}) | 783.3/sq mi (302.4/km^{2}) | 842 | 861 | −2.21% |
| 389 | Onamia | Mille Lacs | | 0.958 square miles (2.48 km^{2}) | 875.8/sq mi (338.1/km^{2}) | 839 | 784 | +7.02% |
| 390 | Stockton | Winona | | 1.697 square miles (4.40 km^{2}) | 493.2/sq mi (190.43/km^{2}) | 837 | 809 | +3.46% |
| 391 | Isle | Mille Lacs | | 2.711 square miles (7.02 km^{2}) | 306.2/sq mi (118.2/km^{2}) | 830 | 803 | +3.36% |
| 392 | St. Stephen | Stearns | | 3.722 square miles (9.64 km^{2}) | 222.19/sq mi (85.79/km^{2}) | 827 | 797 | +3.76% |
| 393 | Browerville | Todd | | 1.089 square miles (2.82 km^{2}) | 759.4/sq mi (293.21/km^{2}) | 821 | 839 | −2.15% |
| 394 | Blackduck | Beltrami | | 2.326 square miles (6.02 km^{2}) | 350.39/sq mi (135.29/km^{2}) | 815 | 845 | −3.55% |
| 395 | Bovey | Itasca | | 2.298 square miles (5.95 km^{2}) | 350.30/sq mi (135.25/km^{2}) | 805 | 829 | −2.90% |
| 396 | Rushford Village | Fillmore | | 33.506 square miles (86.78 km^{2}) | 23.757/sq mi (9.173/km^{2}) | 796 | 790 | +0.76% |
| 397 | Gibbon | Sibley | | 0.664 square miles (1.72 km^{2}) | 1,195.8/sq mi (461.7/km^{2}) | 794 | 784 | +1.28% |
| 398 | Kerkhoven | Swift | | 0.835 square miles (2.16 km^{2}) | 946/sq mi (365.3/km^{2}) | 790 | 805 | −1.86% |
| 399 | Raymond | Kandiyohi | Chippewa | 0.886 square miles (2.29 km^{2}) | 890.5/sq mi (343.8/km^{2}) | 789 | 782 | +0.90% |
| 400 | Fertile | Polk | | 2.076 square miles (5.38 km^{2}) | 374.3/sq mi (144.51/km^{2}) | 777 | 804 | −3.36% |
| 401 | Lamberton | Redwood | | 0.764 square miles (1.98 km^{2}) | 1,013.1/sq mi (391.2/km^{2}) | 774 | 792 | −2.27% |
| 402 | Cleveland | Le Sueur | | 0.547 square miles (1.42 km^{2}) | 1,411.3/sq mi (544.9/km^{2}) | 772 | 747 | +3.35% |
| 403 | Belgrade | Stearns | | 1.202 square miles (3.11 km^{2}) | 613.1/sq mi (236.74/km^{2}) | 737 | 738 | −0.14% |
| 404 | Courtland | Nicollet | | 2.612 square miles (6.77 km^{2}) | 273.35/sq mi (105.54/km^{2}) | 714 | 734 | −2.72% |
| 405 | Adams | Mower | | 1.003 square miles (2.60 km^{2}) | 702.9/sq mi (271.4/km^{2}) | 705 | 683 | +3.22% |
| 406 | Brownton | McLeod | | 0.402 square miles (1.04 km^{2}) | 1,746/sq mi (674.2/km^{2}) | 702 | 731 | −3.97% |
| 407 | Elysian | Le Sueur | Waseca | 1.179 square miles (3.05 km^{2}) | 648.9/sq mi (250.52/km^{2}) | 765 | 708 | +8.05% |
| 408 | Dover | Olmsted | | 1.004 square miles (2.60 km^{2}) | 758.0/sq mi (292.7/km^{2}) | 761 | 782 | −2.69% |
| 409 | Sebeka | Wadena | | 2.473 square miles (6.41 km^{2}) | 303.68/sq mi (117.25/km^{2}) | 751 | 741 | +1.35% |
| 410 | Wabasso | Redwood | | 0.850 square miles (2.20 km^{2}) | 882/sq mi (340.7/km^{2}) | 750 | 739 | +1.49% |
| 411 | Holdingford | Stearns | | 0.900 square miles (2.33 km^{2}) | 827.8/sq mi (319.6/km^{2}) | 745 | 743 | +0.27% |
| 412 | Westbrook | Cottonwood | | 0.621 square miles (1.61 km^{2}) | 1,185.2/sq mi (457.6/km^{2}) | 736 | 758 | −2.90% |
| 413 | Ottertail | Otter Tail | | 4.277 square miles (11.08 km^{2}) | 171.62/sq mi (66.26/km^{2}) | 734 | 629 | +16.69% |
| 414 | Walnut Grove | Redwood | | 1.091 square miles (2.83 km^{2}) | 670.9/sq mi (259.05/km^{2}) | 732 | 751 | −2.53% |
| 415 | Kasota | Le Sueur | | 1.243 square miles (3.22 km^{2}) | 585.7/sq mi (226.13/km^{2}) | 728 | 714 | +1.96% |
| 416 | Greenwood | Hennepin | | 0.359 square miles (0.93 km^{2}) | 2,019/sq mi (779.7/km^{2}) | 725 | 726 | −0.14% |
| 417 | Green Isle | Sibley | | 1.023 square miles (2.65 km^{2}) | 706.7/sq mi (272.9/km^{2}) | 723 | 591 | +22.34% |
| 418 | Hampton | Dakota | | 1.231 square miles (3.19 km^{2}) | 580.0/sq mi (223.95/km^{2}) | 714 | 744 | −4.03% |
| 419 | Lanesboro | Fillmore | | 1.515 square miles (3.92 km^{2}) | 470.0/sq mi (181.46/km^{2}) | 712 | 724 | −1.66% |
| 420 | Lake Park | Becker | | 0.974 square miles (2.52 km^{2}) | 730.0/sq mi (281.8/km^{2}) | 711 | 728 | −2.34% |
| 421 | St. Clair | Blue Earth | | 0.649 square miles (1.68 km^{2}) | 1,089.4/sq mi (420.6/km^{2}) | 707 | 750 | −5.73% |
| 422 | Hoffman | Grant | | 2.098 square miles (5.43 km^{2}) | 335.6/sq mi (129.56/km^{2}) | 704 | 698 | +0.86% |
| 423 | Rollingstone | Winona | | 0.442 square miles (1.14 km^{2}) | 1,590.5/sq mi (614.1/km^{2}) | 703 | 678 | +3.69% |
| 424 | Twin Valley | Norman | | 0.855 square miles (2.21 km^{2}) | 821.1/sq mi (317.0/km^{2}) | 702 | 723 | −2.90% |
| 425 | Mabel | Fillmore | | 0.481 square miles (1.25 km^{2}) | 1,460/sq mi (560/km^{2}) | 700 | 716 | −2.23% |
| 426 | Clear Lake | Sherburne | | 1.043 square miles (2.70 km^{2}) | 660.6/sq mi (255.06/km^{2}) | 689 | 641 | +7.49% |
| 427 | Motley | Morrison | Cass | 1.388 square miles (3.59 km^{2}) | 495.7/sq mi (191.38/km^{2}) | 688 | 680 | +1.18% |
| 428 | Welcome | Martin | | 1.456 square miles (3.77 km^{2}) | 471.8/sq mi (182.18/km^{2}) | 687 | 710 | −3.24% |
| 429 | Clarks Grove | Freeborn | | 0.599 square miles (1.55 km^{2}) | 1,138.6/sq mi (439.6/km^{2}) | 682 | 694 | −1.73% |
| 430 | Trimont | Martin | | 0.786 square miles (2.04 km^{2}) | 867.7/sq mi (335.0/km^{2}) | 682 | 705 | −3.26% |
| 431 | Karlstad | Kittson | | 1.503 square miles (3.89 km^{2}) | 451.8/sq mi (174.43/km^{2}) | 679 | 710 | −4.37% |
| 432 | Freeport | Stearns | | 1.189 square miles (3.08 km^{2}) | 570.2/sq mi (220.17/km^{2}) | 678 | 675 | +0.44% |
| 433 | Cass Lake | Cass | | 1.090 square miles (2.82 km^{2}) | 621.1/sq mi (239.81/km^{2}) | 677 | 675 | +0.30% |
| 434 | Lake Benton | Lincoln | | 3.208 square miles (8.31 km^{2}) | 211.03/sq mi (81.48/km^{2}) | 677 | 687 | −1.46% |
| 435 | Greenbush | Roseau | | 1.536 square miles (3.98 km^{2}) | 439.5/sq mi (169.67/km^{2}) | 675 | 682 | −1.03% |
| 436 | Minnesota Lake | Faribault | Blue Earth | 1.620 square miles (4.20 km^{2}) | 408.6/sq mi (157.78/km^{2}) | 662 | 661 | +0.15% |
| 437 | La Prairie | Itasca | | 1.652 square miles (4.28 km^{2}) | 400.1/sq mi (154.49/km^{2}) | 661 | 660 | +0.15% |
| 438 | Marine on St. Croix | Washington | | 3.908 square miles (10.12 km^{2}) | 169.14/sq mi (65.31/km^{2}) | 661 | 664 | −0.45% |
| 439 | Ellendale | Steele | | 0.834 square miles (2.16 km^{2}) | 789.0/sq mi (304.6/km^{2}) | 658 | 676 | −2.66% |
| 440 | Hills | Rock | | 0.630 square miles (1.63 km^{2}) | 1,041.3/sq mi (402.0/km^{2}) | 656 | 686 | −4.37% |
| 441 | Clarissa | Todd | | 1.015 square miles (2.63 km^{2}) | 645.3/sq mi (249.16/km^{2}) | 655 | 661 | −0.91% |
| 442 | Brooten | Stearns | Pope | 1.587 square miles (4.11 km^{2}) | 410/sq mi (158.1/km^{2}) | 650 | 626 | +3.83% |
| 443 | Taconite | Itasca | | 27.972 square miles (72.45 km^{2}) | 23.095/sq mi (8.917/km^{2}) | 646 | 651 | −0.77% |
| 444 | Brownsdale | Mower | | 0.412 square miles (1.07 km^{2}) | 1,563.1/sq mi (603.5/km^{2}) | 644 | 633 | +1.74% |
| 445 | Buffalo Lake | Renville | | 0.682 square miles (1.77 km^{2}) | 934.0/sq mi (360.6/km^{2}) | 637 | 660 | −3.48% |
| 446 | Center City | Chisago | | 0.591 square miles (1.53 km^{2}) | 1,072.8/sq mi (414.2/km^{2}) | 634 | 629 | +0.79% |
| 447 | Grove City | Meeker | | 0.610 square miles (1.58 km^{2}) | 1,037.7/sq mi (400.7/km^{2}) | 633 | 624 | +1.44% |
| 448 | Randall | Morrison | | 1.999 square miles (5.18 km^{2}) | 312.7/sq mi (120.72/km^{2}) | 625 | 607 | +2.97% |
| 449 | Loretto | Hennepin | | 0.258 square miles (0.67 km^{2}) | 2,376/sq mi (917.4/km^{2}) | 613 | 646 | −5.11% |
| 450 | Butterfield | Watonwan | | 0.405 square miles (1.05 km^{2}) | 1,508.6/sq mi (582.5/km^{2}) | 611 | 601 | +1.66% |
| 451 | Hill City | Aitkin | | 1.114 square miles (2.89 km^{2}) | 544.9/sq mi (210.38/km^{2}) | 607 | 613 | −0.98% |
| 452 | Barnum | Carlton | | 1.009 square miles (2.61 km^{2}) | 599.6/sq mi (231.51/km^{2}) | 605 | 620 | −2.42% |
| 453 | Hendricks | Lincoln | | 0.970 square miles (2.51 km^{2}) | 623.7/sq mi (240.8/km^{2}) | 605 | 616 | −1.79% |
| 454 | Marble | Itasca | | 4.373 square miles (11.33 km^{2}) | 138.35/sq mi (53.42/km^{2}) | 605 | 610 | −0.82% |
| 455 | Sabin | Clay | | 0.454 square miles (1.18 km^{2}) | 1,323.8/sq mi (511.1/km^{2}) | 601 | 619 | −2.91% |
| 456 | Racine | Mower | | 0.668 square miles (1.73 km^{2}) | 880.2/sq mi (339.9/km^{2}) | 588 | 458 | +28.38% |
| 457 | Heron Lake | Jackson | | 1.242 square miles (3.22 km^{2}) | 471.8/sq mi (182.17/km^{2}) | 586 | 602 | −2.66% |
| 458 | Jasper | Pipestone | Rock | 1.019 square miles (2.64 km^{2}) | 575.1/sq mi (222.04/km^{2}) | 586 | 610 | −3.93% |
| 459 | Evansville | Douglas | | 0.784 square miles (2.03 km^{2}) | 744.9/sq mi (287.6/km^{2}) | 584 | 603 | −3.15% |
| 460 | Foreston | Mille Lacs | | 1.439 square miles (3.73 km^{2}) | 403.8/sq mi (155.89/km^{2}) | 581 | 559 | +3.94% |
| 461 | Stephen | Marshall | | 0.787 square miles (2.04 km^{2}) | 738.2/sq mi (285.0/km^{2}) | 581 | 592 | −1.86% |
| 462 | Balaton | Lyon | | 1.451 square miles (3.76 km^{2}) | 398.3/sq mi (153.80/km^{2}) | 578 | 595 | −2.86% |
| 463 | McIntosh | Polk | | 0.999 square miles (2.59 km^{2}) | 577.6/sq mi (223.00/km^{2}) | 577 | 606 | −4.79% |
| 464 | Alden | Freeborn | | 0.965 square miles (2.50 km^{2}) | 595.9/sq mi (230.1/km^{2}) | 575 | 583 | −1.37% |
| 465 | Deerwood | Crow Wing | | 1.489 square miles (3.86 km^{2}) | 384.2/sq mi (148.32/km^{2}) | 572 | 526 | +8.75% |
| 466 | Audubon | Becker | | 0.721 square miles (1.87 km^{2}) | 786.4/sq mi (303.6/km^{2}) | 567 | 560 | +1.25% |
| 467 | Glenville | Freeborn | | 1.053 square miles (2.73 km^{2}) | 532/sq mi (205.3/km^{2}) | 560 | 568 | −1.41% |
| 468 | Ironton | Crow Wing | | 1.448 square miles (3.75 km^{2}) | 387/sq mi (149.3/km^{2}) | 560 | 576 | −2.78% |
| 469 | Kandiyohi | Kandiyohi | | 0.391 square miles (1.01 km^{2}) | 1,432/sq mi (553/km^{2}) | 560 | 569 | −1.58% |
| 470 | Halstad | Norman | | 0.363 square miles (0.94 km^{2}) | 1,529/sq mi (590.3/km^{2}) | 555 | 564 | −1.60% |
| 471 | Hamburg | Carver | | 0.210 square miles (0.54 km^{2}) | 2,605/sq mi (1,006/km^{2}) | 547 | 566 | −3.36% |
| 472 | Village of Minnetonka Beach | Hennepin | | 0.467 square miles (1.21 km^{2}) | 1,171.3/sq mi (452.2/km^{2}) | 547 | 546 | +0.18% |
| 473 | Brownsville | Houston | | 1.849 square miles (4.79 km^{2}) | 294.8/sq mi (113.81/km^{2}) | 545 | 566 | −3.71% |
| 474 | Elmore | Faribault | | 0.846 square miles (2.19 km^{2}) | 643.0/sq mi (248.3/km^{2}) | 544 | 549 | −0.91% |
| 475 | Bertha | Todd | | 1.084 square miles (2.81 km^{2}) | 500.9/sq mi (193.41/km^{2}) | 543 | 560 | −3.04% |
| 476 | Eagle Bend | Todd | | 1.350 square miles (3.50 km^{2}) | 401.5/sq mi (155.01/km^{2}) | 542 | 519 | +4.43% |
| 477 | Pillager | Cass | | 0.849 square miles (2.20 km^{2}) | 637.2/sq mi (246.0/km^{2}) | 541 | 507 | +6.71% |
| 478 | Ranier | Koochiching | | 1.070 square miles (2.77 km^{2}) | 505.6/sq mi (195.22/km^{2}) | 541 | 569 | −4.92% |
| 479 | Ivanhoe | Lincoln | | 0.649 square miles (1.68 km^{2}) | 832/sq mi (321/km^{2}) | 540 | 560 | −3.57% |
| 480 | Good Thunder | Blue Earth | | 0.627 square miles (1.62 km^{2}) | 854.9/sq mi (330.1/km^{2}) | 536 | 560 | −4.29% |
| 481 | Hokah | Houston | | 0.699 square miles (1.81 km^{2}) | 766.8/sq mi (296.1/km^{2}) | 536 | 553 | −3.07% |
| 482 | Argyle | Marshall | | 1.508 square miles (3.91 km^{2}) | 352.1/sq mi (135.96/km^{2}) | 531 | 544 | −2.39% |
| 483 | Littlefork | Koochiching | | 1.190 square miles (3.08 km^{2}) | 445/sq mi (172.0/km^{2}) | 530 | 553 | −4.16% |
| 484 | Lyle | Mower | | 0.756 square miles (1.96 km^{2}) | 695.8/sq mi (268.6/km^{2}) | 526 | 522 | +0.77% |
| 485 | Sunfish Lake | Dakota | | 1.499 square miles (3.88 km^{2}) | 348.2/sq mi (134.45/km^{2}) | 522 | 522 | 0.00% |
| 486 | Cook | St. Louis | | 2.600 square miles (6.73 km^{2}) | 198.08/sq mi (76.48/km^{2}) | 515 | 534 | −3.56% |
| 487 | Jenkins | Crow Wing | | 4.472 square miles (11.58 km^{2}) | 115.16/sq mi (44.46/km^{2}) | 515 | 490 | +5.10% |
| 488 | Willernie | Washington | | 0.125 square miles (0.32 km^{2}) | 4,104/sq mi (1,585/km^{2}) | 513 | 515 | −0.39% |
| 489 | Floodwood | St. Louis | | 1.917 square miles (4.97 km^{2}) | 266.6/sq mi (102.92/km^{2}) | 511 | 517 | −1.16% |
| 490 | Gem Lake | Ramsey | | 1.045 square miles (2.71 km^{2}) | 489.0/sq mi (188.80/km^{2}) | 511 | 528 | −3.22% |
| 491 | Franklin | Renville | | 1.005 square miles (2.60 km^{2}) | 507/sq mi (195.9/km^{2}) | 510 | 493 | +3.45% |
| 492 | Brandon | Douglas | | 0.483 square miles (1.25 km^{2}) | 1,053.8/sq mi (406.9/km^{2}) | 509 | 501 | +1.60% |
| 493 | Brewster | Nobles | | 1.385 square miles (3.59 km^{2}) | 366.8/sq mi (141.62/km^{2}) | 508 | 506 | +0.40% |
| 494 | Graceville | Big Stone | | 0.579 square miles (1.50 km^{2}) | 877.4/sq mi (338.8/km^{2}) | 508 | 529 | −3.97% |
| 495 | Verndale | Wadena | | 1.032 square miles (2.67 km^{2}) | 492.2/sq mi (190.06/km^{2}) | 508 | 511 | −0.59% |
| 496 | Amboy | Blue Earth | | 0.320 square miles (0.83 km^{2}) | 1,584/sq mi (611.7/km^{2}) | 507 | 535 | −5.23% |
| 497 | Prinsburg | Kandiyohi | | 1.011 square miles (2.62 km^{2}) | 501.5/sq mi (193.62/km^{2}) | 507 | 520 | −2.50% |
| 498 | Browns Valley | Traverse | | 0.791 square miles (2.05 km^{2}) | 637.2/sq mi (246.0/km^{2}) | 504 | 558 | −9.68% |
| 499 | Geneva | Freeborn | | 0.468 square miles (1.21 km^{2}) | 1,074.8/sq mi (415.0/km^{2}) | 503 | 508 | −0.98% |
| 500 | Claremont | Dodge | | 1.077 square miles (2.79 km^{2}) | 460/sq mi (179/km^{2}) | 500 | 513 | −2.53% |
| 501 | Cosmos | Meeker | | 0.976 square miles (2.53 km^{2}) | 508.2/sq mi (196.22/km^{2}) | 496 | 507 | −2.17% |
| 502 | Ellsworth | Nobles | | 0.659 square miles (1.71 km^{2}) | 748.1/sq mi (288.8/km^{2}) | 493 | 497 | −0.80% |
| 503 | Sacred Heart | Renville | | 0.992 square miles (2.57 km^{2}) | 494/sq mi (190.7/km^{2}) | 490 | 510 | −3.92% |
| 504 | Kiester | Faribault | | 0.428 square miles (1.11 km^{2}) | 1,137.9/sq mi (439.3/km^{2}) | 487 | 488 | −0.20% |
| 505 | Rothsay | Wilkin | Otter Tail | 0.858 square miles (2.22 km^{2}) | 566.4/sq mi (218.7/km^{2}) | 486 | 498 | −2.41% |
| 506 | Bethel | Anoka | | 0.980 square miles (2.54 km^{2}) | 493.9/sq mi (190.69/km^{2}) | 484 | 476 | +1.68% |
| 507 | Carlos | Douglas | | 0.449 square miles (1.16 km^{2}) | 1,073.5/sq mi (414.5/km^{2}) | 482 | 497 | −3.02% |
| 508 | Pennock | Kandiyohi | | 1.021 square miles (2.64 km^{2}) | 468.2/sq mi (180.76/km^{2}) | 478 | 479 | −0.21% |
| 509 | Upsala | Morrison | | 3.239 square miles (8.39 km^{2}) | 147.58/sq mi (56.98/km^{2}) | 478 | 487 | −1.85% |
| 510 | Ashby | Grant | | 0.551 square miles (1.43 km^{2}) | 860.3/sq mi (332.1/km^{2}) | 474 | 469 | +1.07% |
| 511 | Ulen | Clay | | 1.067 square miles (2.76 km^{2}) | 443.3/sq mi (171.16/km^{2}) | 473 | 476 | −0.63% |
| 512 | Clearbrook | Clearwater | | 0.491 square miles (1.27 km^{2}) | 955.2/sq mi (368.8/km^{2}) | 469 | 464 | +1.08% |
| 513 | Stewart | McLeod | | 0.809 square miles (2.10 km^{2}) | 577.3/sq mi (222.9/km^{2}) | 467 | 489 | −4.50% |
| 514 | Sturgeon Lake | Pine | | 3.769 square miles (9.76 km^{2}) | 123.11/sq mi (47.53/km^{2}) | 464 | 436 | +6.42% |
| 515 | Altura | Winona | | 2.977 square miles (7.71 km^{2}) | 155.53/sq mi (60.05/km^{2}) | 463 | 471 | −1.70% |
| 516 | Fifty Lakes | Crow Wing | | 29.316 square miles (75.93 km^{2}) | 15.759/sq mi (6.085/km^{2}) | 462 | 443 | +4.29% |
| 517 | Lafayette | Nicollet | | 1.258 square miles (3.26 km^{2}) | 367.2/sq mi (141.80/km^{2}) | 462 | 492 | −6.10% |
| 518 | Randolph | Dakota | | 0.953 square miles (2.47 km^{2}) | 483/sq mi (186.4/km^{2}) | 460 | 466 | −1.29% |
| 519 | Wrenshall | Carlton | | 1.491 square miles (3.86 km^{2}) | 306.5/sq mi (118.34/km^{2}) | 457 | 428 | +6.78% |
| 520 | Miltona | Douglas | | 0.671 square miles (1.74 km^{2}) | 676.6/sq mi (261.2/km^{2}) | 454 | 431 | +5.34% |
| 521 | New Germany | Carver | | 0.998 square miles (2.58 km^{2}) | 446.9/sq mi (172.55/km^{2}) | 446 | 464 | −3.88% |
| 522 | Danube | Renville | | 0.487 square miles (1.26 km^{2}) | 907.6/sq mi (350.4/km^{2}) | 442 | 458 | −3.49% |
| 523 | Wykoff | Fillmore | | 0.933 square miles (2.42 km^{2}) | 468.4/sq mi (180.84/km^{2}) | 437 | 432 | +1.16% |
| 524 | Lynd | Lyon | | 1.143 square miles (2.96 km^{2}) | 374.5/sq mi (144.58/km^{2}) | 428 | 436 | −1.83% |
| 525 | Vermillion | Dakota | | 0.985 square miles (2.55 km^{2}) | 434.5/sq mi (167.77/km^{2}) | 428 | 441 | −2.95% |
| 526 | Akeley | Hubbard | | 1.469 square miles (3.80 km^{2}) | 288.0/sq mi (111.18/km^{2}) | 423 | 404 | +4.70% |
| 527 | Kellogg | Wabasha | | 0.310 square miles (0.80 km^{2}) | 1,365/sq mi (526.8/km^{2}) | 423 | 453 | −6.62% |
| 528 | Tower | St. Louis | | 2.920 square miles (7.56 km^{2}) | 144.52/sq mi (55.80/km^{2}) | 422 | 430 | −1.86% |
| 529 | Milan | Chippewa | | 0.682 square miles (1.77 km^{2}) | 612.9/sq mi (236.6/km^{2}) | 418 | 428 | −2.34% |
| 530 | Oklee | Red Lake | | 0.750 square miles (1.94 km^{2}) | 556.0/sq mi (214.7/km^{2}) | 417 | 413 | +0.97% |
| 531 | New Auburn | Sibley | | 0.682 square miles (1.77 km^{2}) | 610.0/sq mi (235.5/km^{2}) | 416 | 411 | +1.22% |
| 532 | Badger | Roseau | | 1.336 square miles (3.46 km^{2}) | 309.9/sq mi (119.65/km^{2}) | 414 | 429 | −3.50% |
| 533 | Chokio | Stevens | | 0.438 square miles (1.13 km^{2}) | 929.2/sq mi (358.8/km^{2}) | 407 | 405 | +0.49% |
| 534 | Bigfork | Itasca | | 1.859 square miles (4.81 km^{2}) | 217.9/sq mi (84.12/km^{2}) | 405 | 400 | +1.25% |
| 535 | Rose Creek | Mower | | 0.490 square miles (1.27 km^{2}) | 822.4/sq mi (317.5/km^{2}) | 403 | 397 | +1.51% |
| 536 | Fisher | Polk | | 0.426 square miles (1.10 km^{2}) | 943.7/sq mi (364.3/km^{2}) | 402 | 422 | −4.74% |
| 537 | Fountain | Fillmore | | 0.994 square miles (2.57 km^{2}) | 400/sq mi (155/km^{2}) | 400 | 409 | −2.20% |
| 538 | Willow River | Pine | | 1.783 square miles (4.62 km^{2}) | 224/sq mi (87/km^{2}) | 400 | 384 | +4.17% |
| 539 | Morton | Renville | | 1.211 square miles (3.14 km^{2}) | 327.0/sq mi (126.26/km^{2}) | 396 | 410 | −3.41% |
| 540 | Ogilvie | Kanabec | | 0.890 square miles (2.31 km^{2}) | 444.9/sq mi (171.79/km^{2}) | 396 | 388 | +2.06% |
| 541 | Nevis | Hubbard | | 0.927 square miles (2.40 km^{2}) | 423.9/sq mi (163.69/km^{2}) | 393 | 377 | +4.24% |
| 542 | Alvarado | Marshall | | 0.209 square miles (0.54 km^{2}) | 1,866/sq mi (720/km^{2}) | 390 | 388 | +0.52% |
| 543 | Waubun | Mahnomen | | 0.514 square miles (1.33 km^{2}) | 756.8/sq mi (292.2/km^{2}) | 389 | 409 | −4.89% |
| 544 | Herman | Grant | | 1.109 square miles (2.87 km^{2}) | 348.1/sq mi (134.39/km^{2}) | 386 | 384 | +0.52% |
| 545 | Erskine | Polk | | 0.645 square miles (1.67 km^{2}) | 595.3/sq mi (229.9/km^{2}) | 384 | 403 | −4.71% |
| 546 | Pine Springs | Washington | | 0.770 square miles (1.99 km^{2}) | 494.8/sq mi (191.0/km^{2}) | 381 | 377 | +1.06% |
| 547 | Remer | Cass | | 1.329 square miles (3.44 km^{2}) | 286/sq mi (110.4/km^{2}) | 380 | 391 | −2.81% |
| 548 | Woodland | Hennepin | | 0.575 square miles (1.49 km^{2}) | 659.1/sq mi (254.5/km^{2}) | 379 | 384 | −1.30% |
| 549 | Hanska | Brown | | 0.247 square miles (0.64 km^{2}) | 1,530/sq mi (590.9/km^{2}) | 378 | 382 | −1.05% |
| 550 | Ghent | Lyon | | 0.313 square miles (0.81 km^{2}) | 1,201/sq mi (463.8/km^{2}) | 376 | 376 | 0.00% |
| 551 | Comfrey | Brown | Cottonwood | 0.428 square miles (1.11 km^{2}) | 876.2/sq mi (338.3/km^{2}) | 375 | 392 | −4.34% |
| 552 | McGregor | Aitkin | | 2.139 square miles (5.54 km^{2}) | 174.85/sq mi (67.51/km^{2}) | 374 | 384 | −2.60% |
| 553 | Rushmore | Nobles | | 0.254 square miles (0.66 km^{2}) | 1,469/sq mi (567.0/km^{2}) | 373 | 365 | +2.19% |
| 554 | Barrett | Grant | | 2.087 square miles (5.41 km^{2}) | 177.77/sq mi (68.64/km^{2}) | 371 | 366 | +1.37% |
| 555 | Round Lake | Nobles | | 0.725 square miles (1.88 km^{2}) | 511.7/sq mi (197.6/km^{2}) | 371 | 377 | −1.59% |
| 556 | Wood Lake | Yellow Medicine | | 0.754 square miles (1.95 km^{2}) | 492.0/sq mi (190.0/km^{2}) | 371 | 381 | −2.62% |
| 557 | Vergas | Otter Tail | | 1.566 square miles (4.06 km^{2}) | 236/sq mi (91.2/km^{2}) | 370 | 348 | +6.32% |
| 558 | Clinton | Big Stone | | 0.957 square miles (2.48 km^{2}) | 385.6/sq mi (148.87/km^{2}) | 369 | 386 | −4.40% |
| 559 | Emmons | Freeborn | | 0.846 square miles (2.19 km^{2}) | 429.1/sq mi (165.7/km^{2}) | 363 | 367 | −1.09% |
| 560 | New Munich | Stearns | | 0.533 square miles (1.38 km^{2}) | 681.1/sq mi (263.0/km^{2}) | 363 | 356 | +1.97% |
| 561 | Underwood | Otter Tail | | 0.587 square miles (1.52 km^{2}) | 616.7/sq mi (238.1/km^{2}) | 362 | 356 | +1.69% |
| 562 | Russell | Lyon | | 0.918 square miles (2.38 km^{2}) | 387.8/sq mi (149.73/km^{2}) | 356 | 348 | +2.30% |
| 563 | Bricelyn | Faribault | | 0.290 square miles (0.75 km^{2}) | 1,210/sq mi (467.3/km^{2}) | 351 | 348 | +0.86% |
| 564 | Newfolden | Marshall | | 1.016 square miles (2.63 km^{2}) | 339.6/sq mi (131.11/km^{2}) | 345 | 352 | −1.99% |
| 565 | St. Marys Point | Washington | | 0.386 square miles (1.00 km^{2}) | 888.6/sq mi (343.1/km^{2}) | 343 | 353 | −2.83% |
| 566 | Lancaster | Kittson | | 2.334 square miles (6.05 km^{2}) | 146.53/sq mi (56.58/km^{2}) | 342 | 364 | −6.04% |
| 567 | Cuyuna | Crow Wing | | 3.234 square miles (8.38 km^{2}) | 105.1/sq mi (40.6/km^{2}) | 340 | 296 | +14.86% |
| 568 | Jeffers | Cottonwood | | 0.392 square miles (1.02 km^{2}) | 867/sq mi (335/km^{2}) | 340 | 349 | −2.58% |
| 569 | Garfield | Douglas | | 0.805 square miles (2.08 km^{2}) | 421.1/sq mi (162.6/km^{2}) | 339 | 349 | −2.87% |
| 570 | Lowry | Pope | | 0.452 square miles (1.17 km^{2}) | 747.8/sq mi (288.7/km^{2}) | 338 | 334 | +1.20% |
| 571 | Long Beach | Pope | | 1.426 square miles (3.69 km^{2}) | 234.2/sq mi (90.43/km^{2}) | 334 | 338 | −1.18% |
| 572 | Swanville | Morrison | Todd | 0.527 square miles (1.36 km^{2}) | 633.8/sq mi (244.7/km^{2}) | 334 | 326 | +2.45% |
| 573 | Darwin | Meeker | | 1.995 square miles (5.17 km^{2}) | 166.92/sq mi (64.45/km^{2}) | 333 | 348 | −4.31% |
| 574 | Finlayson | Pine | | 2.410 square miles (6.24 km^{2}) | 137.76/sq mi (53.19/km^{2}) | 332 | 295 | +12.54% |
| 575 | Deer Creek | Otter Tail | | 4.008 square miles (10.38 km^{2}) | 82.09/sq mi (31.69/km^{2}) | 329 | 330 | −0.30% |
| 576 | Dexter | Mower | | 1.408 square miles (3.65 km^{2}) | 233.7/sq mi (90.22/km^{2}) | 329 | 324 | +1.54% |
| 577 | Wilmont | Nobles | | 0.581 square miles (1.50 km^{2}) | 566.3/sq mi (218.6/km^{2}) | 329 | 332 | −0.90% |
| 578 | Lakeland Shores | Washington | | 0.316 square miles (0.82 km^{2}) | 1,035/sq mi (399.5/km^{2}) | 327 | 339 | −3.54% |
| 579 | Askov | Pine | | 1.258 square miles (3.26 km^{2}) | 259.1/sq mi (100.06/km^{2}) | 326 | 331 | −1.51% |
| 580 | Calumet | Itasca | | 1.800 square miles (4.66 km^{2}) | 180.0/sq mi (69.50/km^{2}) | 324 | 334 | −2.99% |
| 581 | Grey Eagle | Todd | | 0.356 square miles (0.92 km^{2}) | 904.5/sq mi (349.2/km^{2}) | 322 | 330 | −2.42% |
| 582 | Plato | McLeod | | 0.324 square miles (0.84 km^{2}) | 990.7/sq mi (382.5/km^{2}) | 321 | 329 | −2.43% |
| 583 | Sanborn | Redwood | | 2.073 square miles (5.37 km^{2}) | 152.44/sq mi (58.86/km^{2}) | 316 | 323 | −2.17% |
| 584 | Vernon Center | Blue Earth | | 0.489 square miles (1.27 km^{2}) | 644.2/sq mi (248.7/km^{2}) | 315 | 328 | −3.96% |
| 585 | Hartland | Freeborn | | 0.270 square miles (0.70 km^{2}) | 1,163/sq mi (449.0/km^{2}) | 314 | 321 | −2.18% |
| 586 | Canton | Fillmore | | 1.031 square miles (2.67 km^{2}) | 303.6/sq mi (117.22/km^{2}) | 313 | 310 | +0.97% |
| 587 | St. Martin | Stearns | | 0.873 square miles (2.26 km^{2}) | 358.5/sq mi (138.43/km^{2}) | 313 | 312 | +0.32% |
| 588 | Cyrus | Pope | | 0.266 square miles (0.69 km^{2}) | 1,165/sq mi (450/km^{2}) | 310 | 305 | +1.64% |
| 589 | Buckman | Morrison | | 1.013 square miles (2.62 km^{2}) | 302.1/sq mi (116.63/km^{2}) | 306 | 307 | −0.33% |
| 590 | Hackensack | Cass | | 1.021 square miles (2.64 km^{2}) | 299.7/sq mi (115.72/km^{2}) | 306 | 294 | +4.08% |
| 591 | Hollandale | Freeborn | | 0.440 square miles (1.14 km^{2}) | 695.5/sq mi (268.5/km^{2}) | 306 | 308 | −0.65% |
| 592 | Maynard | Chippewa | | 0.599 square miles (1.55 km^{2}) | 507.5/sq mi (196.0/km^{2}) | 304 | 319 | −4.70% |
| 593 | Murdock | Swift | | 0.622 square miles (1.61 km^{2}) | 477.5/sq mi (184.4/km^{2}) | 297 | 306 | −2.94% |
| 594 | Middle River | Marshall | | 0.497 square miles (1.29 km^{2}) | 595.6/sq mi (230.0/km^{2}) | 296 | 304 | −2.63% |
| 595 | Ceylon | Martin | | 0.517 square miles (1.34 km^{2}) | 566.7/sq mi (218.8/km^{2}) | 293 | 303 | −3.30% |
| 596 | Dakota | Winona | | 0.546 square miles (1.41 km^{2}) | 527.5/sq mi (203.7/km^{2}) | 288 | 295 | −2.37% |
| 597 | Belview | Redwood | | 0.916 square miles (2.37 km^{2}) | 311.1/sq mi (120.13/km^{2}) | 285 | 291 | −2.06% |
| 598 | Hendrum | Norman | | 0.253 square miles (0.66 km^{2}) | 1,123/sq mi (433.4/km^{2}) | 284 | 289 | −1.73% |
| 599 | Skyline | Blue Earth | | 0.197 square miles (0.51 km^{2}) | 1,437/sq mi (554.7/km^{2}) | 283 | 288 | −1.74% |
| 600 | Granada | Martin | | 0.571 square miles (1.48 km^{2}) | 486.9/sq mi (188.0/km^{2}) | 278 | 291 | −4.47% |
| 601 | Plummer | Red Lake | | 2.672 square miles (6.92 km^{2}) | 104.04/sq mi (40.17/km^{2}) | 278 | 276 | +0.72% |
| 602 | Nerstrand | Rice | | 1.413 square miles (3.66 km^{2}) | 193.9/sq mi (74.87/km^{2}) | 274 | 273 | +0.37% |
| 603 | Utica | Winona | | 0.987 square miles (2.56 km^{2}) | 277.6/sq mi (107.19/km^{2}) | 274 | 266 | +3.01% |
| 604 | Gonvick | Clearwater | | 1.311 square miles (3.40 km^{2}) | 207.5/sq mi (80.11/km^{2}) | 272 | 263 | +3.42% |
| 605 | Kensington | Douglas | | 0.358 square miles (0.93 km^{2}) | 754/sq mi (291/km^{2}) | 270 | 266 | +1.50% |
| 606 | Vesta | Redwood | | 0.404 square miles (1.05 km^{2}) | 668/sq mi (258/km^{2}) | 270 | 276 | −2.17% |
| 607 | Bowlus | Morrison | | 1.279 square miles (3.31 km^{2}) | 210.3/sq mi (81.21/km^{2}) | 269 | 279 | −3.58% |
| 608 | Mendota | Dakota | | 0.265 square miles (0.69 km^{2}) | 1,015/sq mi (391.9/km^{2}) | 269 | 183 | +46.99% |
| 609 | Beaver Creek | Rock | | 0.529 square miles (1.37 km^{2}) | 506.6/sq mi (195.6/km^{2}) | 268 | 280 | −4.29% |
| 610 | Wilton | Beltrami | | 2.946 square miles (7.63 km^{2}) | 90.63/sq mi (34.99/km^{2}) | 267 | 263 | +1.52% |
| 611 | Backus | Cass | | 0.620 square miles (1.61 km^{2}) | 425.8/sq mi (164.4/km^{2}) | 264 | 263 | +0.38% |
| 612 | Eitzen | Houston | | 0.610 square miles (1.58 km^{2}) | 432.8/sq mi (167.1/km^{2}) | 264 | 279 | −5.38% |
| 613 | Chandler | Murray | | 0.791 square miles (2.05 km^{2}) | 331.2/sq mi (127.9/km^{2}) | 262 | 279 | −6.09% |
| 614 | Freeborn | Freeborn | | 0.183 square miles (0.47 km^{2}) | 1,415/sq mi (546.5/km^{2}) | 259 | 264 | −1.89% |
| 615 | St. Hilaire | Pennington | | 0.782 square miles (2.03 km^{2}) | 331.2/sq mi (127.9/km^{2}) | 259 | 273 | −5.13% |
| 616 | Cromwell | Carlton | | 1.839 square miles (4.76 km^{2}) | 140.29/sq mi (54.17/km^{2}) | 258 | 240 | +7.50% |
| 617 | Gilman | Benton | | 0.711 square miles (1.84 km^{2}) | 358.6/sq mi (138.5/km^{2}) | 255 | 226 | +12.83% |
| 618 | Hayward | Freeborn | | 0.609 square miles (1.58 km^{2}) | 418.7/sq mi (161.7/km^{2}) | 255 | 252 | +1.19% |
| 619 | Milroy | Redwood | | 0.261 square miles (0.68 km^{2}) | 969/sq mi (374.3/km^{2}) | 253 | 259 | −2.32% |
| 620 | Wahkon | Mille Lacs | | 0.988 square miles (2.56 km^{2}) | 254.0/sq mi (98.09/km^{2}) | 251 | 235 | +6.81% |
| 621 | Pease | Mille Lacs | | 0.528 square miles (1.37 km^{2}) | 471.6/sq mi (182.1/km^{2}) | 249 | 238 | +4.62% |
| 622 | Kelliher | Beltrami | | 2.200 square miles (5.70 km^{2}) | 111.82/sq mi (43.17/km^{2}) | 246 | 258 | −4.65% |
| 623 | Lake Lillian | Kandiyohi | | 0.453 square miles (1.17 km^{2}) | 543.0/sq mi (209.7/km^{2}) | 246 | 246 | 0.00% |
| 624 | Lake Wilson | Murray | | 0.412 square miles (1.07 km^{2}) | 597.1/sq mi (230.5/km^{2}) | 246 | 254 | −3.15% |
| 625 | Hewitt | Todd | | 2.063 square miles (5.34 km^{2}) | 118.76/sq mi (45.85/km^{2}) | 245 | 251 | −2.39% |
| 626 | Climax | Polk | | 0.938 square miles (2.43 km^{2}) | 256/sq mi (98.8/km^{2}) | 240 | 243 | −1.23% |
| 627 | Hanley Falls | Yellow Medicine | | 0.249 square miles (0.64 km^{2}) | 964/sq mi (372/km^{2}) | 240 | 243 | −1.23% |
| 628 | Oslo | Marshall | | 0.371 square miles (0.96 km^{2}) | 644.2/sq mi (248.7/km^{2}) | 239 | 239 | 0.00% |
| 629 | Echo | Yellow Medicine | | 0.366 square miles (0.95 km^{2}) | 647.5/sq mi (250.0/km^{2}) | 237 | 243 | −2.47% |
| 630 | Villard | Pope | | 0.851 square miles (2.20 km^{2}) | 266.7/sq mi (102.99/km^{2}) | 227 | 225 | +0.89% |
| 631 | Gary | Norman | | 0.584 square miles (1.51 km^{2}) | 387.0/sq mi (149.4/km^{2}) | 226 | 227 | −0.44% |
| 632 | Peterson | Fillmore | | 0.475 square miles (1.23 km^{2}) | 475.8/sq mi (183.7/km^{2}) | 226 | 234 | −3.42% |
| 633 | Ostrander | Fillmore | | 0.475 square miles (1.23 km^{2}) | 471.6/sq mi (182.1/km^{2}) | 224 | 231 | −3.03% |
| 634 | Bigelow | Nobles | | 0.393 square miles (1.02 km^{2}) | 567.4/sq mi (219.1/km^{2}) | 223 | 227 | −1.76% |
| 635 | Donnelly | Stevens | | 2.784 square miles (7.21 km^{2}) | 79.74/sq mi (30.79/km^{2}) | 222 | 221 | +0.45% |
| 636 | Ruthton | Pipestone | | 0.577 square miles (1.49 km^{2}) | 384.7/sq mi (148.6/km^{2}) | 222 | 226 | −1.77% |
| 637 | Dennison | Goodhue | Rice | 1.261 square miles (3.27 km^{2}) | 174/sq mi (67.4/km^{2}) | 220 | 223 | −1.35% |
| 638 | Pemberton | Blue Earth | | 0.188 square miles (0.49 km^{2}) | 1,165/sq mi (449.8/km^{2}) | 219 | 229 | −4.37% |
| 639 | Elrosa | Stearns | | 0.160 square miles (0.41 km^{2}) | 1,363/sq mi (526.1/km^{2}) | 218 | 213 | +2.35% |
| 640 | Sobieski | Morrison | | 4.000 square miles (10.36 km^{2}) | 54.25/sq mi (20.95/km^{2}) | 217 | 210 | +3.33% |
| 641 | Northrop | Martin | | 0.131 square miles (0.34 km^{2}) | 1,649/sq mi (637/km^{2}) | 216 | 223 | −3.14% |
| 642 | Storden | Cottonwood | | 0.216 square miles (0.56 km^{2}) | 995/sq mi (384.3/km^{2}) | 215 | 225 | −4.44% |
| 643 | Dalton | Otter Tail | | 0.237 square miles (0.61 km^{2}) | 903/sq mi (348.6/km^{2}) | 214 | 215 | −0.47% |
| 644 | Frost | Faribault | | 0.439 square miles (1.14 km^{2}) | 485.2/sq mi (187.3/km^{2}) | 213 | 216 | −1.39% |
| 645 | Rutledge | Pine | | 2.946 square miles (7.63 km^{2}) | 72.30/sq mi (27.92/km^{2}) | 213 | 212 | +0.47% |
| 646 | Bluffton | Otter Tail | | 2.735 square miles (7.08 km^{2}) | 77.51/sq mi (29.93/km^{2}) | 212 | 210 | +0.95% |
| 647 | Flensburg | Morrison | | 6.979 square miles (18.08 km^{2}) | 30.23/sq mi (11.673/km^{2}) | 211 | 216 | −2.31% |
| 648 | Currie | Murray | | 0.550 square miles (1.42 km^{2}) | 382/sq mi (147/km^{2}) | 210 | 224 | −6.25% |
| 649 | Orr | St. Louis | | 1.402 square miles (3.63 km^{2}) | 150/sq mi (57.8/km^{2}) | 210 | 211 | −0.47% |
| 650 | Lewisville | Watonwan | | 0.245 square miles (0.63 km^{2}) | 849/sq mi (327.8/km^{2}) | 208 | 204 | +1.96% |
| 651 | Beardsley | Big Stone | | 0.470 square miles (1.22 km^{2}) | 440.4/sq mi (170.0/km^{2}) | 207 | 216 | −4.17% |
| 652 | Greenwald | Stearns | | 0.713 square miles (1.85 km^{2}) | 290.3/sq mi (112.1/km^{2}) | 207 | 197 | +5.08% |
| 653 | Lismore | Nobles | | 0.349 square miles (0.90 km^{2}) | 593.1/sq mi (229.0/km^{2}) | 207 | 202 | +2.48% |
| 654 | Lucan | Redwood | | 0.395 square miles (1.02 km^{2}) | 519.0/sq mi (200.4/km^{2}) | 205 | 214 | −4.21% |
| 655 | Hitterdal | Clay | | 0.861 square miles (2.23 km^{2}) | 236.9/sq mi (91.48/km^{2}) | 204 | 199 | +2.51% |
| 656 | Waldorf | Waseca | | 0.379 square miles (0.98 km^{2}) | 533.0/sq mi (205.8/km^{2}) | 202 | 201 | +0.50% |
| 657 | Garrison | Crow Wing | | 1.047 square miles (2.71 km^{2}) | 192.0/sq mi (74.12/km^{2}) | 201 | 194 | +3.61% |
| 658 | Ogema | Becker | | 1.160 square miles (3.00 km^{2}) | 170/sq mi (67/km^{2}) | 200 | 208 | −3.85% |
| 659 | Okabena | Jackson | | 0.338 square miles (0.88 km^{2}) | 588.8/sq mi (227.3/km^{2}) | 199 | 203 | −1.97% |
| 660 | Kingston | Meeker | | 0.554 square miles (1.43 km^{2}) | 339.4/sq mi (131.0/km^{2}) | 188 | 184 | +2.17% |
| 661 | Minnesota City | Winona | | 0.263 square miles (0.68 km^{2}) | 715/sq mi (276.0/km^{2}) | 188 | 202 | −6.93% |
| 662 | Forada | Douglas | | 0.537 square miles (1.39 km^{2}) | 348.2/sq mi (134.5/km^{2}) | 187 | 170 | +10.00% |
| 663 | Hardwick | Rock | | 1.756 square miles (4.55 km^{2}) | 106.49/sq mi (41.12/km^{2}) | 187 | 189 | −1.06% |
| 664 | Nelson | Douglas | | 0.661 square miles (1.71 km^{2}) | 281.4/sq mi (108.6/km^{2}) | 186 | 182 | +2.20% |
| 665 | Meire Grove | Stearns | | 0.389 square miles (1.01 km^{2}) | 475.6/sq mi (183.6/km^{2}) | 185 | 180 | +2.78% |
| 666 | Magnolia | Rock | | 0.798 square miles (2.07 km^{2}) | 230.6/sq mi (89.03/km^{2}) | 184 | 196 | −6.12% |
| 667 | South Haven | Wright | | 0.635 square miles (1.64 km^{2}) | 289.8/sq mi (111.9/km^{2}) | 184 | 185 | −0.54% |
| 668 | Warba | Itasca | | 3.226 square miles (8.36 km^{2}) | 56.11/sq mi (21.66/km^{2}) | 181 | 168 | +7.74% |
| 669 | Tenstrike | Beltrami | | 3.307 square miles (8.57 km^{2}) | 54.13/sq mi (20.90/km^{2}) | 179 | 186 | −3.76% |
| 670 | Easton | Faribault | | 0.948 square miles (2.46 km^{2}) | 187.8/sq mi (72.50/km^{2}) | 178 | 177 | +0.56% |
| 671 | Winger | Polk | | 0.324 square miles (0.84 km^{2}) | 549.4/sq mi (212.1/km^{2}) | 178 | 174 | +2.30% |
| 672 | Shelly | Norman | | 0.211 square miles (0.55 km^{2}) | 839/sq mi (323.9/km^{2}) | 177 | 179 | −1.12% |
| 673 | Callaway | Becker | | 0.626 square miles (1.62 km^{2}) | 281.2/sq mi (108.6/km^{2}) | 176 | 178 | −1.12% |
| 674 | Holland | Pipestone | | 0.906 square miles (2.35 km^{2}) | 194.3/sq mi (75.00/km^{2}) | 176 | 178 | −1.12% |
| 675 | Bellechester | Goodhue | Wabasha | 0.316 square miles (0.82 km^{2}) | 550.6/sq mi (212.6/km^{2}) | 174 | 176 | −1.14% |
| 676 | Watson | Chippewa | | 0.175 square miles (0.45 km^{2}) | 994/sq mi (383.9/km^{2}) | 174 | 182 | −4.40% |
| 677 | Grygla | Marshall | | 0.578 square miles (1.50 km^{2}) | 295.8/sq mi (114.2/km^{2}) | 171 | 180 | −5.00% |
| 678 | Lake Bronson | Kittson | | 0.529 square miles (1.37 km^{2}) | 323.3/sq mi (124.8/km^{2}) | 171 | 178 | −3.93% |
| 679 | Big Falls | Koochiching | | 6.043 square miles (15.65 km^{2}) | 28.1/sq mi (10.9/km^{2}) | 170 | 175 | −2.86% |
| 680 | Delavan | Faribault | | 1.005 square miles (2.60 km^{2}) | 169/sq mi (65.3/km^{2}) | 170 | 172 | −1.16% |
| 681 | Dent | Otter Tail | | 0.362 square miles (0.94 km^{2}) | 470/sq mi (181/km^{2}) | 170 | 173 | −1.73% |
| 682 | Wright | Carlton | | 1.463 square miles (3.79 km^{2}) | 116/sq mi (44.9/km^{2}) | 170 | 168 | +1.19% |
| 683 | Felton | Clay | | 1.013 square miles (2.62 km^{2}) | 166.8/sq mi (64.41/km^{2}) | 169 | 177 | −4.52% |
| 684 | Kettle River | Carlton | | 0.386 square miles (1.00 km^{2}) | 435.2/sq mi (168.0/km^{2}) | 168 | 166 | +1.20% |
| 685 | Palisade | Aitkin | | 0.684 square miles (1.77 km^{2}) | 245.6/sq mi (94.8/km^{2}) | 168 | 162 | +3.70% |
| 686 | Waltham | Mower | | 0.478 square miles (1.24 km^{2}) | 351.5/sq mi (135.7/km^{2}) | 168 | 164 | +2.44% |
| 687 | Kennedy | Kittson | | 0.447 square miles (1.16 km^{2}) | 373.6/sq mi (144.2/km^{2}) | 167 | 176 | −5.11% |
| 688 | Wendell | Grant | | 0.994 square miles (2.57 km^{2}) | 166.0/sq mi (64.09/km^{2}) | 165 | 166 | −0.60% |
| 689 | Elizabeth | Otter Tail | | 0.373 square miles (0.97 km^{2}) | 439.7/sq mi (169.8/km^{2}) | 164 | 168 | −2.38% |
| 690 | Iona | Murray | | 0.545 square miles (1.41 km^{2}) | 300.9/sq mi (116.2/km^{2}) | 164 | 166 | −1.20% |
| 691 | Campbell | Wilkin | | 0.237 square miles (0.61 km^{2}) | 688/sq mi (265.5/km^{2}) | 163 | 164 | −0.61% |
| 692 | Porter | Yellow Medicine | | 1.996 square miles (5.17 km^{2}) | 81.66/sq mi (31.53/km^{2}) | 163 | 166 | −1.81% |
| 693 | Winton | St. Louis | | 0.122 square miles (0.32 km^{2}) | 1,320/sq mi (510/km^{2}) | 161 | 169 | −4.73% |
| 694 | Grasston | Kanabec | | 0.933 square miles (2.42 km^{2}) | 170.4/sq mi (65.80/km^{2}) | 159 | 154 | +3.25% |
| 695 | Steen | Rock | | 0.437 square miles (1.13 km^{2}) | 363.8/sq mi (140.5/km^{2}) | 159 | 171 | −7.02% |
| 696 | Longville | Cass | | 0.851 square miles (2.20 km^{2}) | 184.5/sq mi (71.23/km^{2}) | 157 | 153 | +2.61% |
| 697 | Bena | Cass | | 0.505 square miles (1.31 km^{2}) | 308.9/sq mi (119.3/km^{2}) | 156 | 143 | +9.09% |
| 698 | Williams | Lake of the Woods | | 0.976 square miles (2.53 km^{2}) | 159.8/sq mi (61.71/km^{2}) | 156 | 157 | −0.64% |
| 699 | Northome | Koochiching | | 1.457 square miles (3.77 km^{2}) | 106.4/sq mi (41.07/km^{2}) | 155 | 155 | 0.00% |
| 700 | Zumbro Falls | Wabasha | | 0.585 square miles (1.52 km^{2}) | 263.2/sq mi (101.6/km^{2}) | 154 | 155 | −0.65% |
| 701 | Kilkenny | Le Sueur | | 0.136 square miles (0.35 km^{2}) | 1,125/sq mi (434.4/km^{2}) | 153 | 148 | +3.38% |
| 702 | Conger | Freeborn | | 0.130 square miles (0.34 km^{2}) | 1,169/sq mi (451/km^{2}) | 152 | 153 | −0.65% |
| 703 | Clements | Redwood | | 0.377 square miles (0.98 km^{2}) | 398/sq mi (154/km^{2}) | 150 | 155 | −3.23% |
| 704 | Kinney | St. Louis | | 3.911 square miles (10.13 km^{2}) | 37.84/sq mi (14.61/km^{2}) | 148 | 152 | −2.63% |
| 705 | Laporte | Hubbard | | 0.702 square miles (1.82 km^{2}) | 210.8/sq mi (81.4/km^{2}) | 148 | 134 | +10.45% |
| 706 | Mapleview | Mower | | 0.185 square miles (0.48 km^{2}) | 800/sq mi (308.9/km^{2}) | 148 | 144 | +2.78% |
| 707 | Roosevelt | Roseau | Lake of the Woods | 1.027 square miles (2.66 km^{2}) | 143.1/sq mi (55.26/km^{2}) | 147 | 153 | −3.92% |
| 708 | Millville | Wabasha | | 0.150 square miles (0.39 km^{2}) | 967/sq mi (373.2/km^{2}) | 145 | 151 | −3.97% |
| 709 | Bellingham | Lac qui Parle | | 0.387 square miles (1.00 km^{2}) | 372.1/sq mi (143.7/km^{2}) | 144 | 148 | −2.70% |
| 710 | Boyd | Lac qui Parle | | 0.511 square miles (1.32 km^{2}) | 279.8/sq mi (108.0/km^{2}) | 143 | 141 | +1.42% |
| 711 | Shevlin | Clearwater | | 0.805 square miles (2.08 km^{2}) | 171.4/sq mi (66.19/km^{2}) | 138 | 137 | +0.73% |
| 712 | Blomkest | Kandiyohi | | 1.018 square miles (2.64 km^{2}) | 134.6/sq mi (51.96/km^{2}) | 137 | 145 | −5.52% |
| 713 | Coates | Dakota | | 1.498 square miles (3.88 km^{2}) | 91.5/sq mi (35.31/km^{2}) | 137 | 147 | −6.80% |
| 714 | Meadowlands | St. Louis | | 0.386 square miles (1.00 km^{2}) | 354.9/sq mi (137.0/km^{2}) | 137 | 134 | +2.24% |
| 715 | Bingham Lake | Cottonwood | | 0.797 square miles (2.06 km^{2}) | 169.4/sq mi (65.40/km^{2}) | 135 | 137 | −1.46% |
| 716 | Elkton | Mower | | 1.281 square miles (3.32 km^{2}) | 104.6/sq mi (40.39/km^{2}) | 134 | 130 | +3.08% |
| 717 | Heidelberg | Le Sueur | | 0.524 square miles (1.36 km^{2}) | 255.7/sq mi (98.7/km^{2}) | 134 | 137 | −2.19% |
| 718 | Hammond | Wabasha | | 0.160 square miles (0.41 km^{2}) | 831/sq mi (320.9/km^{2}) | 133 | 130 | +2.31% |
| 719 | Roscoe | Stearns | | 0.619 square miles (1.60 km^{2}) | 214.9/sq mi (83.0/km^{2}) | 133 | 130 | +2.31% |
| 720 | Elba | Winona | | 1.937 square miles (5.02 km^{2}) | 68.15/sq mi (26.31/km^{2}) | 132 | 129 | +2.33% |
| 721 | Dunnell | Martin | | 0.153 square miles (0.40 km^{2}) | 856/sq mi (330.6/km^{2}) | 131 | 133 | −1.50% |
| 722 | Erhard | Otter Tail | | 0.552 square miles (1.43 km^{2}) | 239.1/sq mi (92.3/km^{2}) | 132 | 132 | 0.00% |
| 723 | Twin Lakes | Freeborn | | 0.487 square miles (1.26 km^{2}) | 271.0/sq mi (104.7/km^{2}) | 132 | 134 | −1.49% |
| 724 | Taunton | Lyon | | 1.007 square miles (2.61 km^{2}) | 129/sq mi (49.8/km^{2}) | 130 | 136 | −4.41% |
| 725 | Clontarf | Swift | | 2.080 square miles (5.39 km^{2}) | 61.54/sq mi (23.76/km^{2}) | 128 | 128 | 0.00% |
| 726 | Miesville | Dakota | | 1.747 square miles (4.52 km^{2}) | 73.27/sq mi (28.29/km^{2}) | 128 | 138 | −7.25% |
| 727 | Odin | Watonwan | | 0.370 square miles (0.96 km^{2}) | 343.2/sq mi (132.5/km^{2}) | 127 | 123 | +3.25% |
| 728 | Brook Park | Pine | | 0.994 square miles (2.57 km^{2}) | 126.8/sq mi (48.94/km^{2}) | 126 | 132 | −4.55% |
| 729 | Beaver Bay | Lake | | 0.799 square miles (2.07 km^{2}) | 155.2/sq mi (59.92/km^{2}) | 124 | 120 | +3.33% |
| 730 | Harding | Morrison | | 3.102 square miles (8.03 km^{2}) | 39.97/sq mi (15.43/km^{2}) | 124 | 123 | +0.81% |
| 731 | Burtrum | Todd | | 0.567 square miles (1.47 km^{2}) | 216.9/sq mi (83.8/km^{2}) | 123 | 123 | 0.00% |
| 732 | Chickamaw Beach | Cass | | 2.253 square miles (5.84 km^{2}) | 54.59/sq mi (21.08/km^{2}) | 123 | 128 | −3.91% |
| 733 | Ormsby | Watonwan | Martin | 0.353 square miles (0.91 km^{2}) | 345.6/sq mi (133.4/km^{2}) | 122 | 118 | +3.39% |
| 734 | Foxhome | Wilkin | | 0.373 square miles (0.97 km^{2}) | 324.4/sq mi (125.3/km^{2}) | 121 | 126 | −3.97% |
| 735 | Lastrup | Morrison | | 0.369 square miles (0.96 km^{2}) | 325/sq mi (126/km^{2}) | 120 | 120 | 0.00% |
| 736 | Brooks | Red Lake | | 1.152 square miles (2.98 km^{2}) | 102.4/sq mi (39.55/km^{2}) | 118 | 117 | +0.85% |
| 737 | Wolverton | Wilkin | | 0.349 square miles (0.90 km^{2}) | 338.1/sq mi (130.5/km^{2}) | 118 | 128 | −7.81% |
| 738 | Garvin | Lyon | | 0.280 square miles (0.73 km^{2}) | 417.9/sq mi (161.3/km^{2}) | 117 | 124 | −5.65% |
| 739 | Marietta | Lac qui Parle | | 0.367 square miles (0.95 km^{2}) | 318.8/sq mi (123.1/km^{2}) | 117 | 116 | +0.86% |
| 740 | Elmdale | Morrison | | 3.439 square miles (8.91 km^{2}) | 33.73/sq mi (13.02/km^{2}) | 116 | 114 | +1.75% |
| 741 | Federal Dam | Cass | | 2.210 square miles (5.72 km^{2}) | 52.49/sq mi (20.27/km^{2}) | 116 | 123 | −5.69% |
| 742 | Woodstock | Pipestone | | 0.539 square miles (1.40 km^{2}) | 211.5/sq mi (81.7/km^{2}) | 114 | 110 | +3.64% |
| 743 | Brookston | St. Louis | | 0.547 square miles (1.42 km^{2}) | 206.6/sq mi (79.8/km^{2}) | 113 | 118 | −4.24% |
| 744 | Trommald | Crow Wing | | 3.690 square miles (9.56 km^{2}) | 30.62/sq mi (11.82/km^{2}) | 113 | 99 | +14.14% |
| 745 | Riverton | Crow Wing | | 0.810 square miles (2.10 km^{2}) | 137.0/sq mi (52.91/km^{2}) | 111 | 118 | −5.93% |
| 746 | De Graff | Swift | | 0.826 square miles (2.14 km^{2}) | 133/sq mi (51.4/km^{2}) | 110 | 110 | 0.00% |
| 747 | Biscay | McLeod | | 0.075 square miles (0.19 km^{2}) | 1,453/sq mi (561/km^{2}) | 109 | 113 | −3.54% |
| 748 | Perley | Norman | | 0.247 square miles (0.64 km^{2}) | 441.3/sq mi (170.4/km^{2}) | 109 | 113 | −3.54% |
| 749 | Goodridge | Pennington | | 0.188 square miles (0.49 km^{2}) | 574/sq mi (221.8/km^{2}) | 108 | 112 | −3.57% |
| 750 | Mentor | Polk | | 1.905 square miles (4.93 km^{2}) | 56.17/sq mi (21.69/km^{2}) | 107 | 104 | +2.88% |
| 751 | Quamba | Kanabec | | 0.704 square miles (1.82 km^{2}) | 152.0/sq mi (58.68/km^{2}) | 107 | 107 | 0.00% |
| 752 | Effie | Itasca | | 3.725 square miles (9.65 km^{2}) | 28.46/sq mi (10.99/km^{2}) | 106 | 109 | −2.75% |
| 753 | Avoca | Murray | | 0.964 square miles (2.50 km^{2}) | 108.9/sq mi (42.05/km^{2}) | 105 | 111 | −5.41% |
| 754 | Iron Junction | St. Louis | | 0.812 square miles (2.10 km^{2}) | 129.3/sq mi (49.93/km^{2}) | 105 | 110 | −4.55% |
| 755 | McKinley | St. Louis | | 1.426 square miles (3.69 km^{2}) | 72.2/sq mi (27.89/km^{2}) | 103 | 103 | 0.00% |
| 756 | Comstock | Clay | | 0.231 square miles (0.60 km^{2}) | 441.6/sq mi (170.5/km^{2}) | 102 | 100 | +2.00% |
| 757 | Odessa | Big Stone | | 0.965 square miles (2.50 km^{2}) | 105.7/sq mi (40.81/km^{2}) | 102 | 103 | −0.97% |
| 758 | Squaw Lake | Itasca | | 0.810 square miles (2.10 km^{2}) | 125.9/sq mi (48.62/km^{2}) | 102 | 98 | +4.08% |
| 759 | Trosky | Pipestone | | 1.409 square miles (3.65 km^{2}) | 72.4/sq mi (27.95/km^{2}) | 102 | 98 | +4.08% |
| 760 | Danvers | Swift | | 0.695 square miles (1.80 km^{2}) | 145.3/sq mi (56.1/km^{2}) | 101 | 103 | −1.94% |
| 761 | Millerville | Douglas | | 0.861 square miles (2.23 km^{2}) | 112.7/sq mi (43.50/km^{2}) | 97 | 100 | −3.00% |
| 762 | Alpha | Jackson | | 0.214 square miles (0.55 km^{2}) | 449/sq mi (173.2/km^{2}) | 96 | 97 | −1.03% |
| 763 | Minneiska | Wabasha | Winona | 0.522 square miles (1.35 km^{2}) | 183.9/sq mi (71.0/km^{2}) | 96 | 97 | −1.03% |
| 764 | Borup | Norman | | 0.254 square miles (0.66 km^{2}) | 374.0/sq mi (144.4/km^{2}) | 95 | 96 | −1.04% |
| 765 | Alberta | Stevens | | 0.263 square miles (0.68 km^{2}) | 349.8/sq mi (135.1/km^{2}) | 92 | 94 | −2.13% |
| 766 | St. Anthony | Stearns | | 0.493 square miles (1.28 km^{2}) | 186.6/sq mi (72.1/km^{2}) | 92 | 91 | +1.10% |
| 767 | Sunburg | Kandiyohi | | 0.474 square miles (1.23 km^{2}) | 194.1/sq mi (74.9/km^{2}) | 92 | 94 | −2.13% |
| 768 | St. Leo | Yellow Medicine | | 0.253 square miles (0.66 km^{2}) | 359.7/sq mi (138.9/km^{2}) | 91 | 93 | −2.15% |
| 769 | Lengby | Polk | | 0.246 square miles (0.64 km^{2}) | 366/sq mi (141/km^{2}) | 90 | 92 | −2.17% |
| 770 | West Union | Todd | | 0.444 square miles (1.15 km^{2}) | 203/sq mi (78/km^{2}) | 90 | 92 | −2.17% |
| 771 | Revere | Redwood | | 0.573 square miles (1.48 km^{2}) | 153.6/sq mi (59.3/km^{2}) | 88 | 89 | −1.12% |
| 772 | Holt | Marshall | | 1.002 square miles (2.60 km^{2}) | 86.8/sq mi (33.52/km^{2}) | 87 | 90 | −3.33% |
| 773 | Beltrami | Polk | | 1.999 square miles (5.18 km^{2}) | 43.02/sq mi (16.61/km^{2}) | 86 | 88 | −2.27% |
| 774 | Georgetown | Clay | | 1.019 square miles (2.64 km^{2}) | 84.4/sq mi (32.59/km^{2}) | 86 | 86 | 0.00% |
| 775 | Holloway | Swift | | 1.400 square miles (3.63 km^{2}) | 60.7/sq mi (23.44/km^{2}) | 85 | 87 | −2.30% |
| 776 | Darfur | Watonwan | | 0.229 square miles (0.59 km^{2}) | 366.8/sq mi (141.6/km^{2}) | 84 | 84 | 0.00% |
| 777 | Arco | Lincoln | | 0.290 square miles (0.75 km^{2}) | 286.2/sq mi (110.5/km^{2}) | 83 | 87 | −4.60% |
| 778 | Bruno | Pine | | 0.997 square miles (2.58 km^{2}) | 83.2/sq mi (32.14/km^{2}) | 83 | 85 | −2.35% |
| 779 | Fort Ripley | Crow Wing | | 1.290 square miles (3.34 km^{2}) | 64.3/sq mi (24.84/km^{2}) | 83 | 84 | −1.19% |
| 780 | Bock | Mille Lacs | | 0.167 square miles (0.43 km^{2}) | 491/sq mi (189.6/km^{2}) | 82 | 78 | +5.13% |
| 781 | Richville | Otter Tail | | 0.986 square miles (2.55 km^{2}) | 83.2/sq mi (32.11/km^{2}) | 82 | 77 | +6.49% |
| 782 | Turtle River | Beltrami | | 1.067 square miles (2.76 km^{2}) | 76.9/sq mi (29.67/km^{2}) | 82 | 88 | −6.82% |
| 783 | Bejou | Mahnomen | | 0.287 square miles (0.74 km^{2}) | 282.2/sq mi (109.0/km^{2}) | 81 | 84 | −3.57% |
| 784 | New Trier | Dakota | | 0.188 square miles (0.49 km^{2}) | 431/sq mi (166.4/km^{2}) | 81 | 86 | −5.81% |
| 785 | Nimrod | Wadena | | 0.954 square miles (2.47 km^{2}) | 84.9/sq mi (32.78/km^{2}) | 81 | 84 | −3.57% |
| 786 | Seaforth | Redwood | | 1.017 square miles (2.63 km^{2}) | 77.7/sq mi (29.99/km^{2}) | 79 | 82 | −3.66% |
| 787 | Viking | Marshall | | 0.516 square miles (1.34 km^{2}) | 153.1/sq mi (59.1/km^{2}) | 79 | 79 | 0.00% |
| 788 | Dundee | Nobles | | 0.307 square miles (0.80 km^{2}) | 254.1/sq mi (98.1/km^{2}) | 78 | 73 | +6.85% |
| 789 | Zemple | Itasca | | 0.651 square miles (1.69 km^{2}) | 118.3/sq mi (45.7/km^{2}) | 77 | 78 | −1.28% |
| 790 | Lake Henry | Stearns | | 0.198 square miles (0.51 km^{2}) | 384/sq mi (148.2/km^{2}) | 76 | 72 | +5.56% |
| 791 | Nielsville | Polk | | 0.215 square miles (0.56 km^{2}) | 353.5/sq mi (136.5/km^{2}) | 76 | 78 | −2.56% |
| 792 | La Salle | Watonwan | | 0.087 square miles (0.23 km^{2}) | 862/sq mi (333/km^{2}) | 75 | 79 | −5.06% |
| 793 | Wanda | Redwood | | 0.259 square miles (0.67 km^{2}) | 289.6/sq mi (111.8/km^{2}) | 75 | 72 | +4.17% |
| 794 | Kerrick | Pine | | 0.995 square miles (2.58 km^{2}) | 73.4/sq mi (28.33/km^{2}) | 73 | 71 | +2.82% |
| 795 | Genola | Morrison | | 0.307 square miles (0.80 km^{2}) | 234.5/sq mi (90.6/km^{2}) | 72 | 70 | +2.86% |
| 796 | Solway | Beltrami | | 1.029 square miles (2.67 km^{2}) | 70.0/sq mi (27.02/km^{2}) | 72 | 73 | −1.37% |
| 797 | Clitherall | Otter Tail | | 0.191 square miles (0.49 km^{2}) | 372/sq mi (143.5/km^{2}) | 71 | 62 | +14.52% |
| 798 | Dumont | Traverse | | 0.430 square miles (1.11 km^{2}) | 165.1/sq mi (63.8/km^{2}) | 71 | 75 | −5.33% |
| 799 | Evan | Brown | | 1.033 square miles (2.68 km^{2}) | 68/sq mi (26.2/km^{2}) | 70 | 70 | 0.00% |
| 800 | Spring Hill | Stearns | | 0.728 square miles (1.89 km^{2}) | 96/sq mi (37.1/km^{2}) | 70 | 68 | +2.94% |
| 801 | Taopi | Mower | | 0.391 square miles (1.01 km^{2}) | 179/sq mi (69/km^{2}) | 70 | 61 | +14.75% |
| 802 | Walters | Faribault | | 0.198 square miles (0.51 km^{2}) | 354/sq mi (137/km^{2}) | 70 | 69 | +1.45% |
| 803 | Whalan | Fillmore | | 0.430 square miles (1.11 km^{2}) | 160.5/sq mi (62.0/km^{2}) | 69 | 67 | +2.99% |
| 804 | Strandquist | Marshall | | 0.261 square miles (0.68 km^{2}) | 260.5/sq mi (100.6/km^{2}) | 68 | 70 | −2.86% |
| 805 | Wolf Lake | Becker | | 0.320 square miles (0.83 km^{2}) | 209.4/sq mi (80.8/km^{2}) | 67 | 71 | −5.63% |
| 806 | Nassau | Lac qui Parle | | 0.159 square miles (0.41 km^{2}) | 415/sq mi (160.3/km^{2}) | 66 | 65 | +1.54% |
| 807 | Sargeant | Mower | | 0.798 square miles (2.07 km^{2}) | 82.7/sq mi (31.93/km^{2}) | 66 | 63 | +4.76% |
| 808 | Tintah | Traverse | | 0.752 square miles (1.95 km^{2}) | 87.8/sq mi (33.89/km^{2}) | 66 | 67 | −1.49% |
| 809 | Manhattan Beach | Crow Wing | | 1.531 square miles (3.97 km^{2}) | 41.8/sq mi (16.14/km^{2}) | 64 | 61 | +4.92% |
| 810 | Nashua | Wilkin | | 3.513 square miles (9.10 km^{2}) | 18.22/sq mi (7.03/km^{2}) | 64 | 67 | −4.48% |
| 811 | Kent | Wilkin | | 0.239 square miles (0.62 km^{2}) | 263.6/sq mi (101.8/km^{2}) | 63 | 65 | −3.08% |
| 812 | Ihlen | Pipestone | | 0.373 square miles (0.97 km^{2}) | 163.5/sq mi (63.1/km^{2}) | 61 | 61 | 0.00% |
| 813 | Henriette | Pine | | 0.280 square miles (0.73 km^{2}) | 214/sq mi (83/km^{2}) | 60 | 57 | +5.26% |
| 814 | Cedar Mills | Meeker | | 0.320 square miles (0.83 km^{2}) | 184.4/sq mi (71.2/km^{2}) | 59 | 62 | −4.84% |
| 815 | Kenneth | Rock | | 1.062 square miles (2.75 km^{2}) | 55.6/sq mi (21.45/km^{2}) | 59 | 60 | −1.67% |
| 816 | Tamarack | Aitkin | | 3.501 square miles (9.07 km^{2}) | 16.85/sq mi (6.51/km^{2}) | 59 | 62 | −4.84% |
| 817 | St. Rosa | Stearns | | 0.368 square miles (0.95 km^{2}) | 157.6/sq mi (60.9/km^{2}) | 58 | 58 | 0.00% |
| 818 | Wilder | Jackson | | 0.789 square miles (2.04 km^{2}) | 72.2/sq mi (27.89/km^{2}) | 57 | 62 | −8.06% |
| 819 | Farwell | Pope | | 0.251 square miles (0.65 km^{2}) | 223.1/sq mi (86.1/km^{2}) | 56 | 56 | 0.00% |
| 820 | Halma | Kittson | | 0.937 square miles (2.43 km^{2}) | 59.8/sq mi (23.08/km^{2}) | 56 | 58 | −3.45% |
| 821 | Gully | Polk | | 0.246 square miles (0.64 km^{2}) | 223.6/sq mi (86.3/km^{2}) | 55 | 59 | −6.78% |
| 822 | Hatfield | Pipestone | | 2.791 square miles (7.23 km^{2}) | 19.71/sq mi (7.61/km^{2}) | 55 | 53 | +3.77% |
| 823 | Hadley | Murray | | 0.294 square miles (0.76 km^{2}) | 183.7/sq mi (70.9/km^{2}) | 54 | 54 | 0.00% |
| 824 | Vining | Otter Tail | | 1.150 square miles (2.98 km^{2}) | 47.0/sq mi (18.13/km^{2}) | 54 | 62 | −12.90% |
| 825 | Dovray | Murray | | 0.249 square miles (0.64 km^{2}) | 212.9/sq mi (82.2/km^{2}) | 53 | 58 | −8.62% |
| 826 | Manchester | Freeborn | | 0.074 square miles (0.19 km^{2}) | 716/sq mi (277/km^{2}) | 53 | 52 | +1.92% |
| 827 | Hazel Run | Yellow Medicine | | 0.760 square miles (1.97 km^{2}) | 68.4/sq mi (26.42/km^{2}) | 52 | 55 | −5.45% |
| 828 | Leonidas | St. Louis | | 1.326 square miles (3.43 km^{2}) | 38.5/sq mi (14.85/km^{2}) | 51 | 50 | +2.00% |
| 829 | Mizpah | Koochiching | | 3.018 square miles (7.82 km^{2}) | 16.90/sq mi (6.52/km^{2}) | 51 | 58 | −12.07% |
| 830 | Norcross | Grant | | 1.558 square miles (4.04 km^{2}) | 32.7/sq mi (12.64/km^{2}) | 51 | 52 | −1.92% |
| 831 | Myrtle | Freeborn | | 0.097 square miles (0.25 km^{2}) | 505/sq mi (195.0/km^{2}) | 49 | 47 | +4.26% |
| 832 | St. Vincent | Kittson | | 1.027 square miles (2.66 km^{2}) | 47.7/sq mi (18.42/km^{2}) | 49 | 57 | −14.04% |
| 833 | Urbank | Otter Tail | | 0.661 square miles (1.71 km^{2}) | 71.1/sq mi (27.45/km^{2}) | 47 | 52 | −9.62% |
| 834 | Sedan | Pope | | 0.507 square miles (1.31 km^{2}) | 90.7/sq mi (35.0/km^{2}) | 46 | 43 | +6.98% |
| 835 | Delhi | Redwood | | 0.761 square miles (1.97 km^{2}) | 59.1/sq mi (22.83/km^{2}) | 45 | 46 | −2.17% |
| 836 | Westport | Pope | | 0.264 square miles (0.68 km^{2}) | 166.7/sq mi (64.4/km^{2}) | 44 | 44 | 0.00% |
| 837 | McGrath | Aitkin | | 0.371 square miles (0.96 km^{2}) | 113.2/sq mi (43.7/km^{2}) | 42 | 41 | +2.44% |
| 838 | Regal | Kandiyohi | | 0.513 square miles (1.33 km^{2}) | 79.9/sq mi (30.9/km^{2}) | 41 | 43 | −4.65% |
| 839 | Humboldt | Kittson | | 0.111 square miles (0.29 km^{2}) | 351/sq mi (135.7/km^{2}) | 39 | 41 | −4.88% |
| 840 | Leonard | Clearwater | | 0.463 square miles (1.20 km^{2}) | 84.2/sq mi (32.5/km^{2}) | 39 | 41 | −4.88% |
| 841 | Denham | Pine | | 1.326 square miles (3.43 km^{2}) | 28.7/sq mi (11.06/km^{2}) | 38 | 37 | +2.70% |
| 842 | Trail | Polk | | 0.998 square miles (2.58 km^{2}) | 38.1/sq mi (14.70/km^{2}) | 38 | 40 | −5.00% |
| 843 | Aldrich | Wadena | | 0.490 square miles (1.27 km^{2}) | 69.4/sq mi (26.8/km^{2}) | 34 | 35 | −2.86% |
| 844 | Boy River | Cass | | 0.373 square miles (0.97 km^{2}) | 85.8/sq mi (33.1/km^{2}) | 32 | 26 | +23.08% |
| 845 | Cobden | Brown | | 0.993 square miles (2.57 km^{2}) | 32.2/sq mi (12.44/km^{2}) | 32 | 36 | −11.11% |
| 846 | Doran | Wilkin | | 0.204 square miles (0.53 km^{2}) | 152.0/sq mi (58.7/km^{2}) | 31 | 36 | −13.89% |
| 847 | Louisburg | Lac qui Parle | | 0.254 square miles (0.66 km^{2}) | 114.2/sq mi (44.1/km^{2}) | 29 | 31 | −6.45% |
| 848 | Correll | Big Stone | | 0.382 square miles (0.99 km^{2}) | 70.7/sq mi (27.3/km^{2}) | 27 | 26 | +3.85% |
| 849 | Strathcona | Roseau | | 0.496 square miles (1.28 km^{2}) | 54.4/sq mi (21.0/km^{2}) | 27 | 25 | +8.00% |
| 850 | Johnson | Big Stone | | 0.310 square miles (0.80 km^{2}) | 74.2/sq mi (28.6/km^{2}) | 23 | 24 | −4.17% |
| 851 | Florence | Lyon | | 0.108 square miles (0.28 km^{2}) | 194/sq mi (75.1/km^{2}) | 21 | 28 | −25.00% |
| 852 | Hillman | Morrison | | 0.622 square miles (1.61 km^{2}) | 33.8/sq mi (13.0/km^{2}) | 21 | 23 | −8.70% |
| 853 | Donaldson | Kittson | | 0.227 square miles (0.59 km^{2}) | 83.7/sq mi (32.3/km^{2}) | 19 | 20 | −5.00% |
| 854 | Barry | Big Stone | | 0.253 square miles (0.66 km^{2}) | 55.3/sq mi (21.4/km^{2}) | 14 | 16 | −12.50% |
| 855 | Funkley | Beltrami | | 0.756 square miles (1.96 km^{2}) | 15.9/sq mi (6.13/km^{2}) | 12 | 18 | −33.33% |
| 856 | Kinbrae | Nobles | | 0.867 square miles (2.25 km^{2}) | 13.8/sq mi (5.34/km^{2}) | 12 | 10 | +20.00% |

== See also ==
- List of townships in Minnesota
- List of census-designated places in Minnesota
- List of counties in Minnesota

== Images ==
Notable incorporated cities in Minnesota

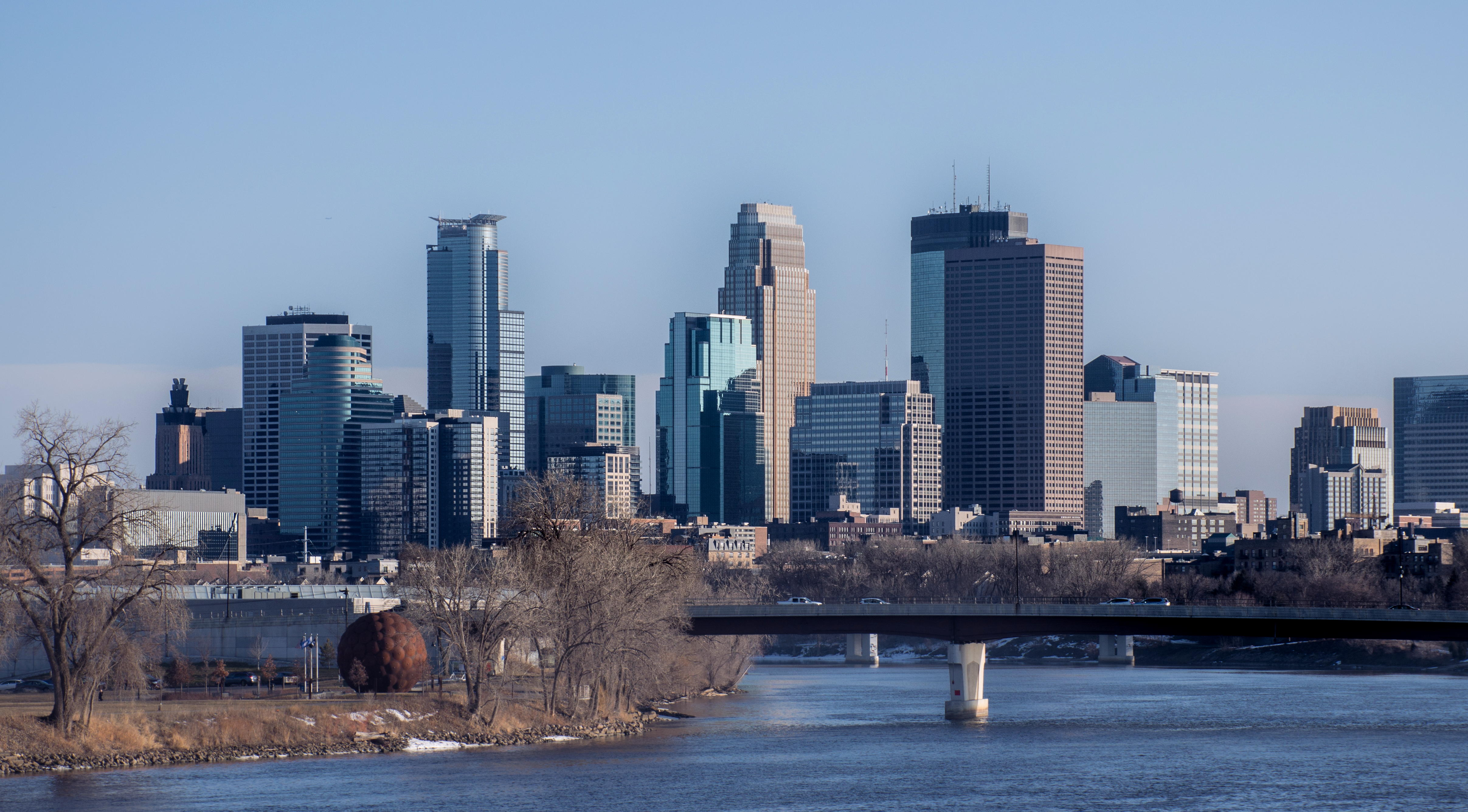
Minneapolis, most populous city in Minnesota

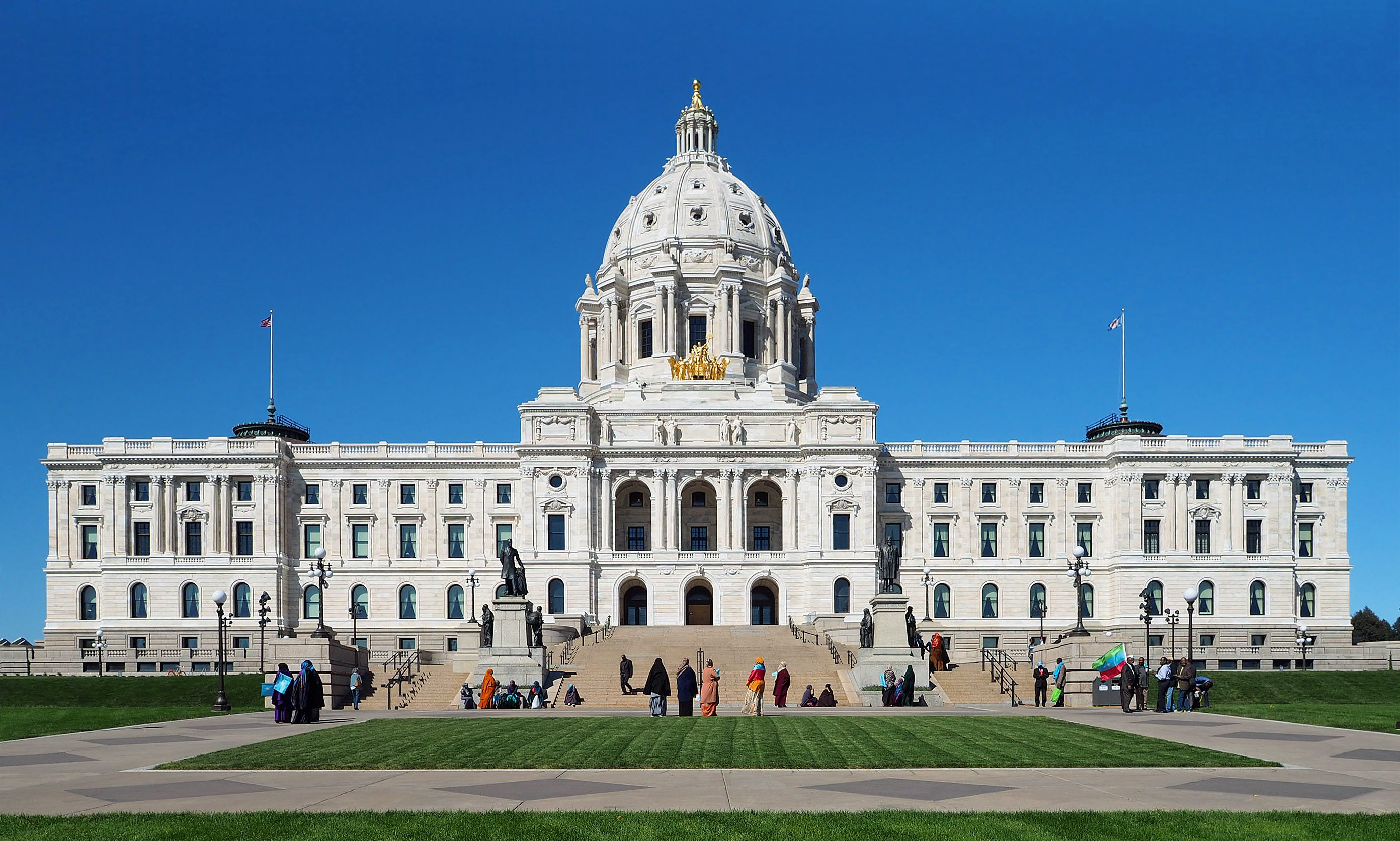
Saint Paul, the capital of Minnesota and its second most populous city

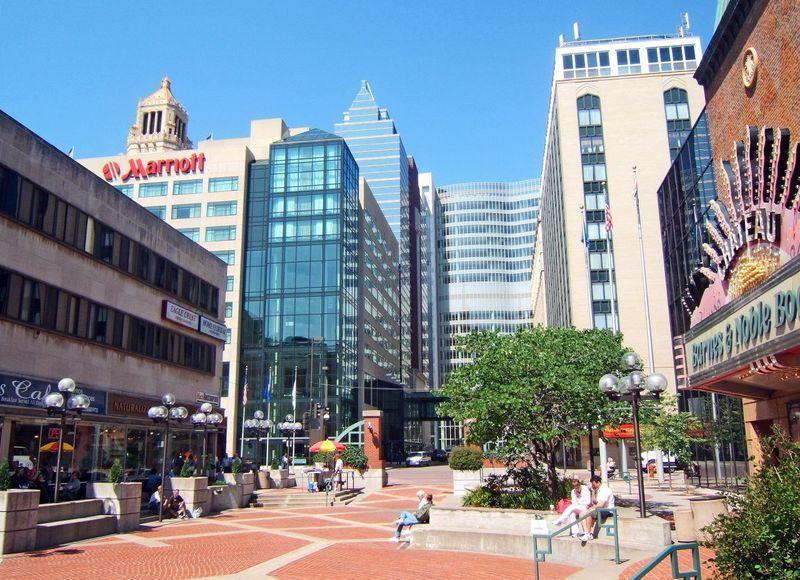
Rochester, the third most populous city

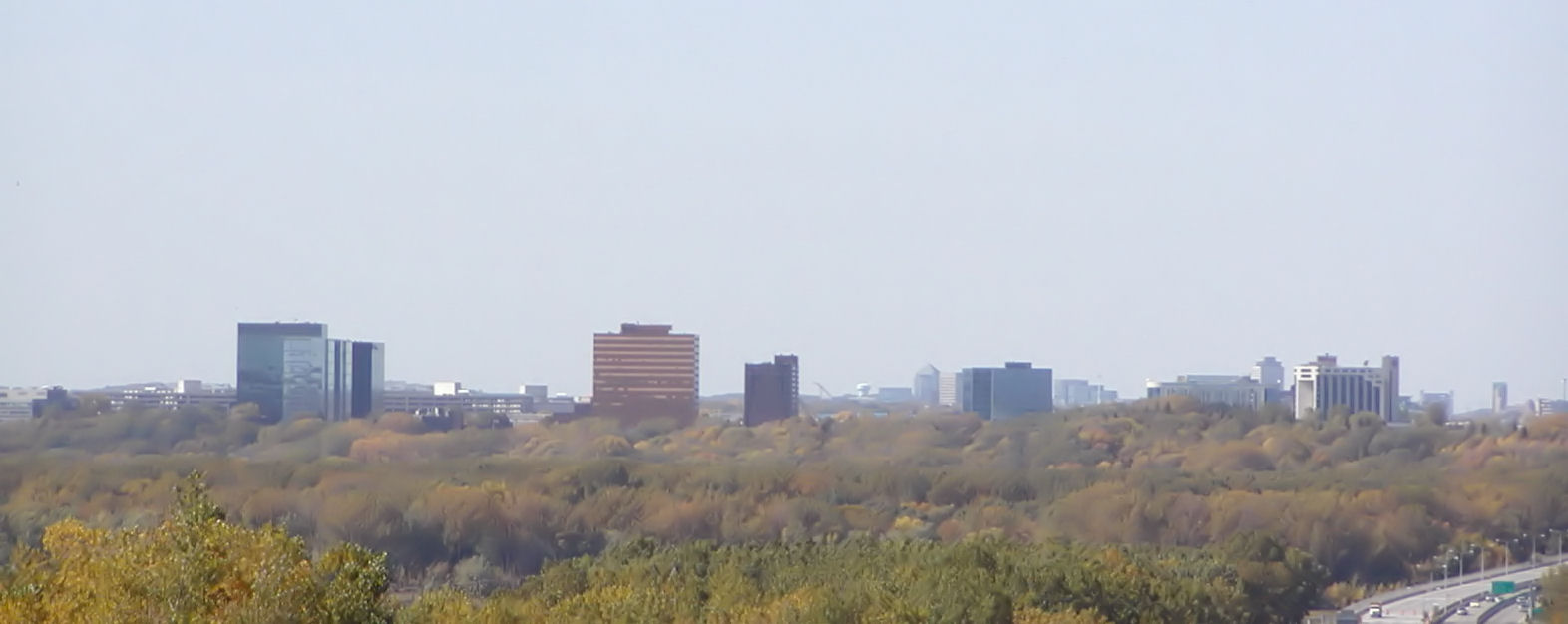
Bloomington, the fourth most populous city

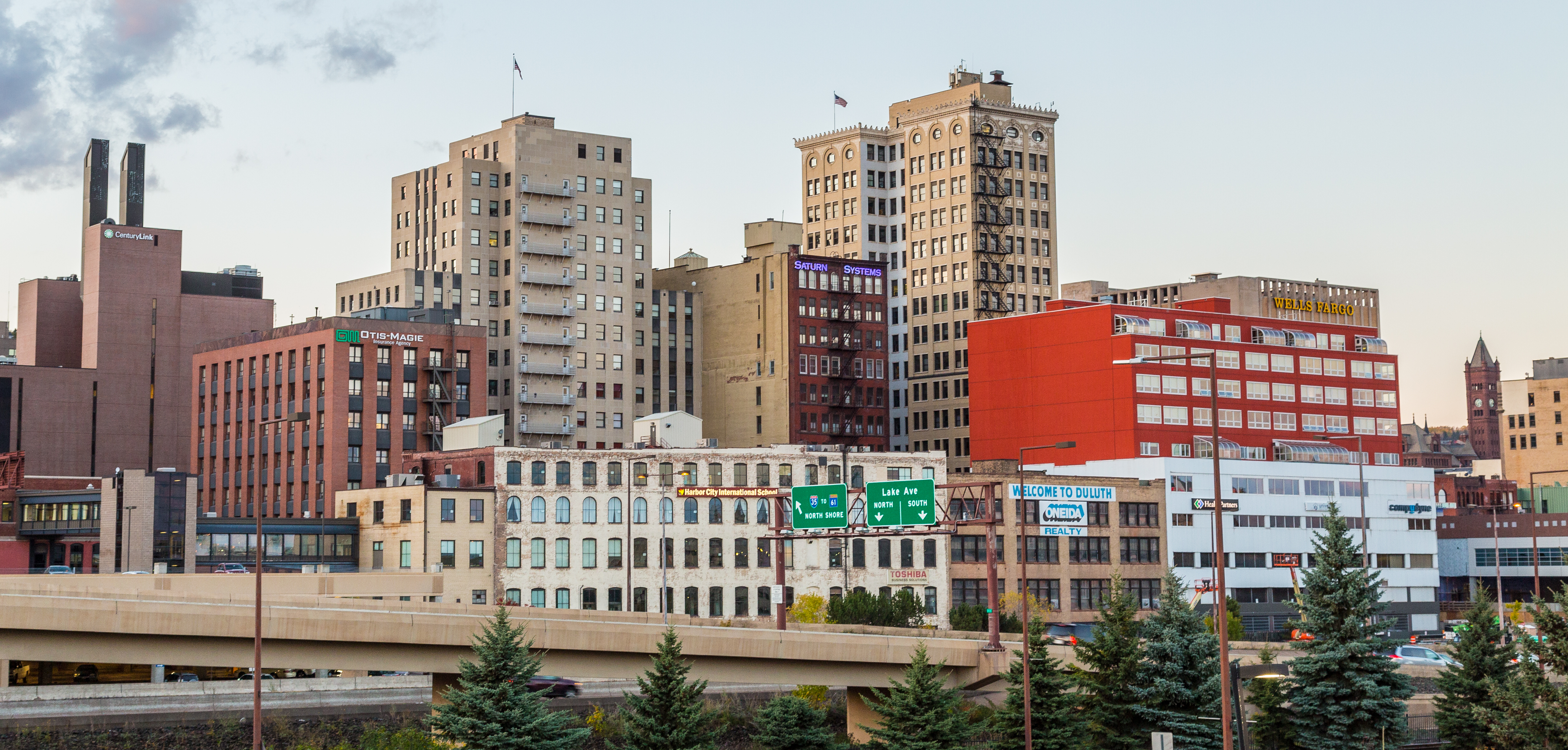
Duluth, the fifth most populous city

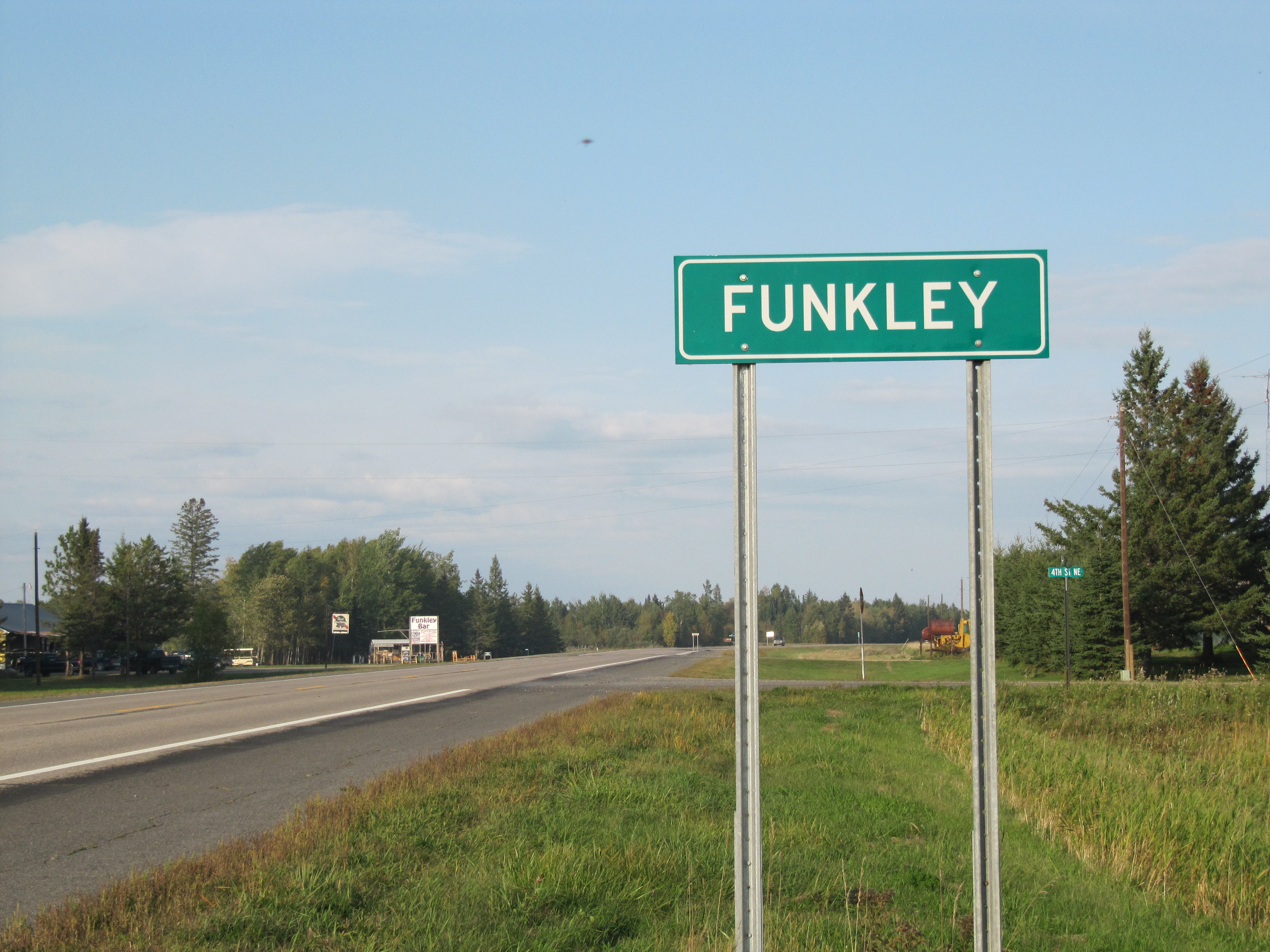
Funkley, tied with Kinbrae for least populous incorporated city in Minnesota
