= List of Minnesota locations by per capita income =

Minnesota ranks 1st in the Midwest and 14th highest nationwide in per capita personal income. The state average surpasses the national average by 3%. Per Capita Personal Income of $74,943 in Minnesota and Per Capita Personal Income of $72,425 in the United States in 2024.

== Minnesota Counties Ranked by Per Capita Income in 2023 ==
Note: Data is from the 2023 United States Census Estimate Data and the 2019-2023 American Community Survey 5-Year Estimates.

Rank	County	Per Capita Personal Income (2023)	Median Household Income (2023)	Median Family Income (2010)	Population (2024)	Number of Households (2023)	Number of Housing Units (2023)
1	Hennepin	$95,574	$96,339	$81,043	1,273,334	534,573	579,806
2	Carver	$93,242	$123,144	$92,412	112,628	40,231	43,202
3	Washington	$84,018	$114,457	$92,087	283,960	103,411	111,849
4	Traverse	$82,905	$65,931	$54,485	3,134	1,410	1,912
5	Scott	$81,213	$120,247	$92,408	157,206	54,238	57,707
6	Redwood	$76,945	$67,024	$55,829	15,254	6,156	7,110
7	Dakota	$75,019	$105,212	$87,445	453,156	171,630	181,442
8	Wilkin	$74,577	$69,635	$57,973	6,268	2,691	2,991
9	Marshall	$72,481	$71,701	$61,300	8,771	3,740	4,418
—	Minnesota	$72,366	$87,556	$71,307	5,793,151	2,282,967	2,575,411
10	Yellow Medicine	$71,912	$71,701	$58,491	9,373	3,740	4,418
11	Olmsted	$71,904	$93,494	$79,422	166,424	66,629	72,234
12	Pipestone	$69,853	$66,073	$55,609	9,100	3,971	4,343
13	Swift	$69,348	$62,601	$55,278	9,666	4,134	4,706
14	Ramsey	$69,310	$81,004	$69,079	542,015	219,075	236,285
—	United States	$68,531	$78,538	$62,982	340,110,988	127,482,865	145,344,636
15	Pennington	$68,190	$72,561	$56,820	13,652	6,170	6,879
16	Murray	$67,663	$74,475	$54,647	8,044	3,601	4,458
17	Red Lake	$67,464	$77,500	$56,210	3,882	1,650	1,872
18	Lac qui Parle	$66,536	$71,639	$54,522	6,636	2,881	3,470
19	Big Stone	$66,381	$65,475	$54,034	5,067	2,179	3,002
20	Goodhue	$65,921	$82,749	$68,217	47,982	19,631	21,348
21	Douglas	$65,827	$77,264	$59,953	39,933	17,416	22,608
22	Wright	$65,241	$106,666	$76,641	154,593	52,757	58,826
23	Cook	$65,513	$71,643	$56,146	5,571	2,700	6,142
24	Kittson	$64,925	$69,615	$61,890	3,992	1,758	2,267
25	Brown	$64,232	$68,690	$60,078	25,710	10,946	11,849
26	Lake of the Woods	$64,010	$70,091	$51,161	3,797	1,665	3,546
27	Pope	$63,885	$72,205	$58,581	11,495	4,987	6,483
28	Le Sueur	$63,719	$90,218	$68,053	29,458	11,499	13,148
29	Houston	$63,545	$77,087	$63,523	18,352	8,074	8,829
30	Stearns	$63,053	$76,447	$65,475	163,997	60,937	67,071
31	Anoka	$62,935	$98,764	$78,603	376,840	136,171	144,008
32	Renville	$62,855	$69,086	$56,568	14,453	5,965	6,918
33	Wabasha	$62,412	$80,133	$62,917	21,574	9,129	10,342
34	Chisago	$62,286	$98,260	$72,093	59,105	21,252	23,347
35	Todd	$62,276	$63,039	$50,755	25,955	10,049	13,174
36	Rock	$61,899	$70,698	$58,147	9,525	3,956	4,296
37	Roseau	$61,800	$73,611	$55,962	15,265	6,058	7,287
38	Kandiyohi	$61,664	$75,097	$60,812	44,674	17,450	20,581
39	McLeod	$61,496	$78,468	$69,289	36,780	14,971	16,057
40	Lyon	$61,228	$72,761	$63,793	25,577	10,003	11,332
41	Jackson	$61,129	$69,955	$59,238	9,861	4,421	4,909
42	Martin	$60,933	$62,969	$57,139	19,561	8,840	9,756
43	Dodge	$60,718	$92,943	$75,170	21,242	8,018	8,630
44	Nicollet	$60,524	$80,362	$69,653	34,493	12,984	13,780
45	Becker	$60,360	$71,117	$55,907	35,444	14,404	20,168
46	Lincoln	$60,182	$67,715	$58,953	5,564	2,435	3,068
47	Polk	$60,175	$69,136	$62,601	30,413	12,448	14,748
48	Sibley	$60,166	$76,082	$60,948	15,194	5,884	6,558
49	Waseca	$60,130	$75,052	$60,975	18,684	7,505	7,968
50	Cottonwood	$59,882	$68,239	$51,705	11,338	4,659	5,227
51	Sherburne	$59,643	$102,965	$79,789	103,059	34,951	37,695
52	Otter Tail	$59,478	$70,912	$53,391	60,884	25,181	36,812
53	Saint Louis	$59,235	$69,455	$60,136	200,794	86,264	104,530
54	Winona	$58,318	$70,198	$62,679	49,973	20,288	21,879
55	Grant	$58,301	$72,957	$52,599	6,109	2,521	3,148
56	Steele	$58,222	$83,448	$67,105	37,434	15,001	16,157
57	Cass	$57,880	$64,937	$51,063	31,442	12,768	24,794
58	Nobles	$57,743	$65,509	$52,356	21,969	7,689	8,398
59	Stevens	$57,718	$71,060	$65,283	9,819	3,835	4,220
60	Lake	$57,668	$75,621	$57,462	10,698	5,030	7,531
61	Hubbard	$57,515	$70,622	$53,876	22,050	8,885	14,792
62	Crow Wing	$56,919	$71,343	$55,554	68,642	28,778	43,130
63	Fillmore	$56,844	$75,225	$59,034	21,502	8,626	9,778
64	Mower	$56,722	$71,495	$58,476	40,900	15,570	17,071
65	Meeker	$56,379	$75,037	$59,495	23,491	9,141	10,852
66	Chippewa	$56,174	$69,192	$58,769	12,299	5,196	5,670
67	Benton	$56,137	$71,480	$63,566	41,881	16,494	17,719
68	Freeborn	$56,100	$69,012	$56,774	30,314	12,885	14,141
69	Watonwan	$55,976	$70,593	$55,104	11,204	4,314	4,877
70	Rice	$55,702	$82,792	$69,796	69,025	23,345	25,443
71	Isanti	$55,537	$86,573	$66,806	43,687	15,875	17,528
72	Faribault	$55,356	$64,391	$53,946	13,886	6,170	6,909
73	Koochiching	$55,115	$69,115	$57,963	11,594	5,710	7,457
74	Blue Earth	$55,016	$72,623	$63,702	70,700	27,183	30,188
75	Itasca	$54,574	$66,380	$56,890	45,442	18,510	25,760
76	Clearwater	$54,531	$64,934	$46,566	8,630	3,245	4,460
77	Clay	$53,925	$77,664	$65,678	66,848	25,939	27,851
78	Norman	$53,560	$69,833	$53,530	6,284	2,676	3,247
79	Mille Lacs	$53,553	$71,455	$55,523	27,577	10,739	13,208
80	Beltrami	$53,382	$67,257	$54,781	46,762	17,908	21,976
81	Morrison	$53,069	$68,640	$56,481	34,520	13,860	16,305
82	Carlton	$52,392	$80,042	$61,425	36,745	13,972	15,994
83	Aitkin	$51,695	$59,498	$47,074	16,335	6,935	14,419
84	Kanabec	$51,455	$71,915	$51,856	16,608	6,475	7,878
85	Wadena	$49,621	$56,882	$47,898	14,437	5,889	7,068
86	Mahnomen	$48,138	$53,925	$45,265	5,296	1,871	2,548
87	Pine	$46,122	$69,666	$51,504	30,319	11,913	17,509

== Minnesota Places Ranked by Per Capita Income in 2023 ==
Rank	City	Per Capita Income (2023)	Median Household Income (2023)	Population (2023)	Number of Households (2023)
1	Lakeville	$57,879	$147,992	76,243	24,959
2	Plymouth	$63,647	$130,793	77,648	32,425
3	Woodbury	$57,643	$120,588	79,538	28,546
4	Maple Grove	$61,045	$104,200	71,288	27,726
5	Eagan	$52,242	$101,896	67,396	27,852
6	Blaine	$41,197	$100,172	73,774	25,092
7	Brooklyn Park	$40,661	$87,532	82,017	29,265
8	Bloomington	$48,465	$86,206	87,398	37,724
9	Rochester	$52,002	$85,240	122,413	50,658
10	Minneapolis	$53,072	$81,001	425,115	188,944
11	Saint Paul	$41,741	$73,975	303,820	123,067
12	Duluth	$43,108	$61,163	87,680	37,150
13	St. Cloud	$32,575	$61,112	71,013	27,748

=== Minnesota Places Ranked by Per Capita Income in 2014 ===
1. $122,922 – Woodland
2. $107,075 – Sunfish Lake
3. $105,167 – Greenwood
4. $90,253 – Minnetonka Beach
5. $83,803 – Medina
6. $83,704 – Orono
7. $80,529 – North Oaks
8. $77,406 – Deephaven
9. $76,197 – Dellwood
10. $68,370 – Tonka Bay
11. $68,063 – Medicine Lake
12. $63,280 – Lilydale
13. $61,438 – Edina
14. $61,295 – Shorewood
15. $60,681 – Wayzata
16. $59,773 – Erhard
17. $57,519 – Mendota Heights
18. $57,143 – Fish Lake
19. $55,974 – Gem Lake
20. $55,350 – Mendota
21. $54,692 – Minnetrista
22. $54,371 – Independence
23. $52,604 – Birchwood Village
24. $52,439 – Lakeland Shores
25. $51,585 – Greenfield
26. $51,516 – St. Marys Point
27. $50,435 – Eden Prairie
28. $49,262 – Marine on St. Croix
29. $48,600 – Minnetonka
30. $48,416 – Excelsior
31. $47,853 – Chanhassen
32. $47,142 – Afton
33. $46,764 – Grant
34. $46,672 – Victoria
35. $46,375 – Plymouth
36. $46,053 – Lake Elmo
37. $44,819 – Golden Valley
38. $44,260 – Mahtomedi
39. $44,112 – Manhattan Beach
40. $44,047 – Woodbury
41. $44,033 – Shoreview
42. $43,833 – Maple Grove
43. $43,283 – Pine Springs
44. $43,113 – Spring Park
45. $42,924 – Corcoran
46. $42,647 – Crosslake
47. $42,090 – Long Beach
48. $41,810 – Prior Lake
49. $41,734 – East Gull Lake
50. $41,037 – Eagan
51. $41,021 – Oakport
52. $40,992 – Pine Island
53. $40,910 – Burtrum
54. $40,867 – Mound
55. $40,500 – Pine Bend
56. $39,502 – St. Louis Park
57. $39,468 – Carver
58. $39,209 – Hatfield
59. $39,199 – Dayton
60. $38,600 – Johnson
61. $38,444 – Apple Valley
62. $37,641 – The Lakes
63. $37,573 – Silver Creek
64. $37,552 – Rogers
65. $37,534 – Hugo
66. $37,499 – Skyline
67. $37,343 – Long Lake
68. $37,318 – Sargeant
69. $37,211 – Vadnais Heights
70. $37,110 – Lakeville
71. $36,932 – Savage
72. $36,892 – Oronoco
73. $36,778 – Hanover
74. $36,462 – Stillwater
75. $36,430 – Bloomington
76. $36,364 – Andover
77. $36,293 – St. Anthony (Hennepin and Ramsey Counties)
78. $36,215 – Lino Lakes
79. $36,193 – Hallock
80. $36,130 – Finlayson
81. $36,079 – Lake Shore
82. $35,966 – Ham Lake
83. $35,862 – Champlin
84. $35,772 – Chaska
85. $35,732 – Merrifield
86. $35,674 – Center City
87. $35,408 – Lakeland
88. $35,396 – Falcon Heights
89. $35,212 – Inver Grove Heights
90. $35,062 – Freeport
91. $34,977 – Minneiska
92. $34,934 – Roseville
93. $34,926 – Scandia
94. $34,872 – Chickamaw Beach
95. $34,812 – Ottertail
96. $34,780 – St. Vincent
97. $34,709 – St. Augusta
98. $34,682 – Alpha
99. $34,597 – Ranier
100. $34,481 – Arden Hills
101. $34,430 – Columbus
102. $34,426 – Nisswa
103. $34,264 – Rosemount
104. $34,224 – Argyle
105. $34,189 – Heidelberg
106. $34,079 – Arnold
107. $34,050 – Strathcona
108. $33,752 – Cohasset
109. $33,672 – St. Rosa
110. $33,629 – East Bethel
111. $33,625 – Rochester
112. $33,523 – New Brighton
113. $33,312 – Dakota
114. $33,224 – Blaine
115. $33,071 – Baxter
116. $33,008 – Waverly
117. $32,972 – St. Michael
118. $32,936 – Bird Island
119. $32,681 – Elkton
120. $32,667 – Regal
121. $32,652 – Hitterdal
122. $32,636 – Circle Pines
123. $32,633 – Wyoming
124. $32,615 – Lake St. Croix Beach
125. $32,582 – Ramsey
126. $32,538 – Wilton
127. $32,507 – Squaw Lake
128. $32,435 – Elko New Market
129. $32,359 – Oak Grove
130. $32,350 – Elk River
131. $32,324 – Waconia
132. $32,281 – Watertown
133. $32,237 – Loretto
134. $32,232 – Minneapolis
135. $32,220 – Albertville
136. $32,050 – Farmington
137. $31,977 – Vermillion
138. $31,965 – Shakopee
139. $31,930 – Manchester
140. $31,911 – Burnsville
141. $31,885 – Sartell
142. $31,882 – Hadley
143. $31,870 – White Bear Lake
144. $31,869 – Oakdale
145. $31,724 – Cottage Grove
146. $31,713 – Courtland
147. $31,476 – Chisago City
148. $31,348 – Dumont
149. $31,346 – St. Bonifacius
150. $31,345 – Hermantown
151. $31,298 – Martin Lake
152. $31,081 – Elysian
153. $31,040 – Comstock
154. $30,919 – Fifty Lakes
155. $30,897 – Hastings
156. $30,896 – Forest Lake
157. $30,861 – Warsaw
158. $30,807 – Lindstrom
159. $30,801 – Rockford
160. $30,797 – Hamburg
161. $30,757 – Cottonwood
162. $30,691 – Delano
163. $30,652 – Coon Rapids
164. $30,583 – Spicer
165. $30,535 – Eitzen
166. $30,457 – Byron
167. $30,430 – Nowthen
168. $30,284 – Homer
169. $30,211 – Big Lake (Carlton County)
170. $30,156 – Centerville
171. $30,142 – Otsego
172. $30,094 – Wanda
173. $30,066 – Prinsburg
174. $30,028 – Rockville
175. $30,008 – Blomkest
176. $29,922 – Robbinsdale
177. $29,916 – Warba
178. $29,864 – Maplewood
179. $29,802 – Benson
180. $29,788 – Mayer
181. $29,673 – Plato
182. $29,621 – Kellogg
183. $29,616 – Felton
184. $29,578 – North Mankato
185. $29,521 – Graceville
186. $29,489 – Oak Park Heights
187. $29,470 – Garden City
188. $29,466 – Coates
189. $29,393 – Hopkins
190. $29,338 – Easton
191. $29,313 – Avon
192. $29,312 – Stephen
193. $29,293 – Florence
194. $29,270 – Norcross
195. $29,263 – Breezy Point
196. $29,209 – Little Canada
197. $29,172 – Miesville
198. $29,168 – New Hope
199. $29,150 – Lucan
200. $29,144 – Frontenac
201. $29,117 – Stanchfield
202. $29,104 – New Prague
203. $29,098 – Finland
204. $29,053 – Vergas
205. $29,006 – Mountain Iron
206. $28,928 – Mounds View
207. $28,923 – Rushford Village
208. $28,921 – Hawley
209. $28,801 – Minnesota Lake
210. $28,800 – Eagle Lake
211. $28,778 – Maple Plain
212. $28,776 – Gilman
213. $28,758 – Forada
214. $28,633 – Wilder
215. $28,628 – Goodview
216. $28,581 – Lake Wilson
217. $28,545 – Waldorf
218. $28,532 – Mahtowa
219. $28,490 – Nerstrand
220. $28,475 – Clontarf
221. $28,471 – Mantorville
222. $28,469 – Hayward
223. $28,460 – Crystal
224. $28,442 – Whipholt
225. $28,308 – Jordan
226. $28,231 – New Trier
227. $28,188 – Monticello
228. $28,139 – Bigfork
229. $28,089 – Richfield
230. $27,987 – Vernon Center
231. $27,943 – Albany
232. $27,937 – Wabasha
233. $27,889 – Randolph
234. $27,883 – Madison Lake
235. $27,805 – Proctor
236. $27,796 – Belle Plaine
237. $27,792 – Morris
238. $27,772 – Biscay
239. $27,749 – Nicollet
240. $27,739 – Dunnell
241. $27,709 – Cologne
242. $27,658 – Porter
243. $27,657 – Marshall
244. $27,641 – Brownsville
245. $27,593 – Beltrami
246. $27,588 – Emily
247. $27,467 – Owatonna
248. $27,466 – Greenbush
249. $27,453 – Wendell
250. $27,443 – Fairmont
251. $27,443 – Cleveland
252. $27,438 – Granite Falls
253. $27,433 – Esko
254. $27,400 – Zumbro Falls
255. $27,398 – Grand Marais
256. $27,394 – Conger
257. $27,284 – Cedar Mills
258. $27,282 – New Ulm
259. $27,263 – Brooks
260. $27,239 – West St. Paul
261. $27,185 – St. Paul Park
262. $27,158 – Red Wing
263. $27,138 – Searles
264. $27,128 – Osseo
265. $27,120 – Alberta
266. $27,068 – Holdingford
267. $27,055 – St. Stephen
268. $27,034 – North Branch
269. $27,017 – Eyota
270. $27,015 – Rice
271. $27,004 – Spring Lake Park
272. $26,998 – St. Francis
273. $26,954 – Newport
274. $26,937 – Wheaton
275. $26,931 – Fridley
276. $26,863 – Lake City
277. $26,859 – Kasson
278. $26,856 – Villard
279. $26,840 – Clear Lake
280. $26,837 – Buffalo
281. $26,760 – Fort Ripley
282. $26,746 – Cannon Falls
283. $26,744 – Barnesville
284. $26,732 – Holloway
285. $26,731 – Elrosa
286. $26,727 – Bethel
287. $26,705 – Soudan
288. $26,693 – Coleraine
289. $26,677 – Tamarack
290. $26,672 – Minneota
291. $26,618 – Chatfield
292. $26,616 – Ortonville
293. $26,586 – Hutchinson
294. $26,576 – North St. Paul
295. $26,538 – Jackson
296. $26,508 – Brooklyn Park
297. $26,480 – Madelia
298. $26,462 – Greenwald
299. $26,441 – Good Thunder
300. $26,414 – Wolverton
301. $26,375 – Roy Lake
302. $26,365 – Darwin
303. $26,354 – Dundas
304. $26,307 – Lonsdale
305. $26,303 – Perham
306. $26,268 – Saint Paul
307. $26,247 – Lowry
308. $26,179 – Battle Lake
309. $26,146 – Wabasso
310. $26,140 – Slayton
311. $26,129 – Lamberton
312. $26,126 – Hendrum
313. $26,084 – Glenwood
314. $26,082 – Le Roy
315. $26,075 – Newfolden
316. $26,025 – Lafayette
317. $25,992 – Elgin
318. $25,979 – Odin
319. $25,962 – Thomson
320. $25,961 – Grygla
321. $25,942 – Anoka
322. $25,922 – Fountain
323. $25,911 – Peterson
324. $25,890 – Lanesboro
325. $25,866 – Detroit Lakes
326. $25,833 – Lake Crystal
327. $25,764 – East Grand Forks
328. $25,757 – Lynd
329. $25,752 – Bayport
330. $25,746 – Hampton
331. $25,715 – Duluth
332. $25,708 – Olivia
333. $25,700 – La Crescent
334. $25,696 – Ormsby
335. $25,676 – Hokah
336. $25,638 – Le Sueur
337. $25,634 – Altura
338. $25,624 – Hayfield
339. $25,618 – Blooming Prairie
340. $25,603 – Hector
341. $25,585 – Starbuck
342. $25,566 – Belgrade
343. $25,563 – Mazeppa
344. $25,555 – Roscoe
345. $25,549 – Clara City
346. $25,546 – Warren
347. $25,544 – South St. Paul
348. $25,517 – Madison
349. $25,496 – Fulda
350. $25,482 – Stewartville
351. $25,475 – Freeborn
352. $25,449 – Turtle River
353. $25,437 – Milroy
354. $25,427 – Mabel
355. $25,402 – Becker
356. $25,399 – Stockton
357. $25,398 – Isanti
358. $25,363 – Lutsen
359. $25,331 – Franklin
360. $25,287 – St. Clair
361. $25,262 – Plainview
362. $25,246 – Rollingstone
363. $25,244 – Racine
364. $25,244 – Henderson
365. $25,230 – Redwood Falls
366. $25,219 – Winsted
367. $25,194 – Oslo
368. $25,177 – Glencoe
369. $25,176 – Columbia Heights
370. $25,151 – Tower
371. $25,098 – Zumbrota
372. $25,089 – Whalan
373. $25,079 – Kenyon
374. $25,068 – Lastrup
375. $25,063 – Kinney
376. $25,056 – Silver Bay
377. $25,011 – Hendricks
378. $25,011 – Sabin
379. $24,997 – Lauderdale
380. $24,977 – Norwood Young America
381. $24,977 – Beaver Creek
382. $24,974 – Beardsley
383. $24,956 – Iron Junction
384. $24,955 – Eagle Bend
385. $24,925 – Kerrick
386. $24,922 – Lake Henry
387. $24,920 – Russell
388. $24,919 – Lewiston
389. $24,909 – Cuyuna
390. $24,906 – Fergus Falls
391. $24,905 – Blue Earth
392. $24,852 – Lake George
393. $24,819 – Amboy
394. $24,787 – Garfield
395. $24,782 – Clearwater
396. $24,744 – Lakefield
397. $24,617 – Ashby
398. $24,612 – Richville
399. $24,587 – Adams
400. $24,544 – Holt
401. $24,516 – Roseau
402. $24,493 – Dent
403. $24,467 – Montevideo
404. $24,452 – Leota
405. $24,442 – Big Lake
406. $24,437 – Cold Spring
407. $24,417 – Waltham
408. $24,410 – Trimont
409. $24,388 – Morgan
410. $24,385 – Avoca
411. $24,384 – Truman
412. $24,355 – Chandler
413. $24,345 – Janesville
414. $24,340 – Albert Lea
415. $24,319 – Bellingham
416. $24,283 – St. Hilaire
417. $24,282 – Hoyt Lakes
418. $24,267 – Waite Park
419. $24,254 – Wrenshall
420. $24,250 – Sauk Centre
421. $24,246 – Ada
422. $24,245 – La Salle
423. $24,214 – Elbow Lake (Grant County)
424. $24,211 – Dennison
425. $24,198 – Hanska
426. $24,187 – Red Lake Falls
427. $24,183 – Sedan
428. $24,173 – Grand Meadow
429. $24,150 – Brownton
430. $24,134 – Willernie
431. $24,101 – Gilbert
432. $24,083 – Cokato
433. $24,070 – Brownsdale
434. $24,025 – Babbitt
435. $24,011 – Northfield
436. $24,007 – Gary
437. $23,998 – Crookston
438. $23,978 – Upsala
439. $23,970 – Sauk Rapids
440. $23,968 – Campbell
441. $23,951 – Clements
442. $23,933 – Renville
443. $23,924 – Alden
444. $23,899 – Dover
445. $23,891 – Wood Lake
446. $23,858 – Aitkin
447. $23,856 – Thief River Falls
448. $23,845 – Rose Creek
449. $23,844 – Palisade
450. $23,843 – Hollandale
451. $23,838 – Fisher
452. $23,835 – Litchfield
453. $23,831 – Nielsville
454. $23,822 – Lester Prairie
455. $23,807 – Taylors Falls
456. $23,778 – Sleepy Eye
457. $23,770 – Luverne
458. $23,695 – Preston
459. $23,671 – Pipestone
460. $23,649 – Austin
461. $23,644 – Medford
462. $23,618 – Hibbing
463. $23,592 – Dawson
464. $23,579 – Clarkfield
465. $23,564 – Dexter
466. $23,553 – Ellendale
467. $23,553 – Aurora
468. $23,553 – Alexandria
469. $23,539 – Breckenridge
470. $23,534 – Paynesville
471. $23,517 – Milaca
472. $23,511 – Sherburn
473. $23,505 – Richmond
474. $23,494 – Harris
475. $23,487 – Cosmos
476. $23,472 – Goodhue
477. $23,446 – Dundee
478. $23,436 – Moorhead
479. $23,397 – Clarks Grove
480. $23,396 – Foxhome
481. $23,390 – Sunburg
482. $23,385 – Taconite
483. $23,373 – Two Harbors
484. $23,365 – Sobieski
485. $23,362 – Adrian
486. $23,356 – Underwood
487. $23,354 – Iona
488. $23,346 – Baker
489. $23,335 – Royalton
490. $23,305 – Spring Grove
491. $23,290 – Willow River
492. $23,277 – Stacy
493. $23,277 – Ghent
494. $23,276 – Glenville
495. $23,251 – St. Charles
496. $23,249 – Mankato
497. $23,247 – Annandale
498. $23,232 – Wells
499. $23,224 – Balaton
500. $23,219 – Kent
501. $23,217 – Nelson
502. $23,215 – Waseca
503. $23,206 – Montrose
504. $23,206 – McIntosh
505. $23,195 – Trosky
506. $23,194 – Cloquet
507. $23,193 – New Munich
508. $23,113 – Maple Lake
509. $23,113 – Carlos
510. $23,107 – Geneva
511. $23,105 – Utica
512. $23,096 – Gaylord
513. $23,092 – Edgerton
514. $23,088 – Wanamingo
515. $23,078 – St. Cloud
516. $23,077 – Ostrander
517. $23,060 – Waterville
518. $23,053 – Fairfax
519. $23,009 – Jenkins
520. $22,995 – Lyle
521. $22,994 – Springfield
522. $22,967 – West Union
523. $22,964 – Green Isle
524. $22,956 – Crosby
525. $22,945 – Glyndon
526. $22,891 – Middle River
527. $22,886 – Windom
528. $22,874 – Willmar
529. $22,845 – Pemberton
530. $22,845 – Littlefork
531. $22,830 – Roosevelt
532. $22,815 – Cambridge
533. $22,811 – Fairhaven
534. $22,804 – Foreston
535. $22,801 – Ely
536. $22,777 – Claremont
537. $22,774 – Faribault
538. $22,772 – Grey Eagle
539. $22,766 – Danvers
540. $22,760 – McKinley (St. Louis County)
541. $22,747 – Stewart (McLeod County)
542. $22,736 – Minnesota City
543. $22,725 – Nashwauk
544. $22,681 – Lexington
545. $22,663 – Zimmerman
546. $22,662 – Taopi
547. $22,640 – Storden
548. $22,618 – Walker
549. $22,614 – Halma
550. $22,609 – Ihlen
551. $22,604 – Rock Creek
552. $22,576 – Winthrop
553. $22,569 – Swanville
554. $22,566 – St. Martin
555. $22,563 – Donnelly
556. $22,556 – Spring Valley
557. $22,550 – Ivanhoe
558. $22,534 – Winnebago
559. $22,515 – Askov
560. $22,512 – Arlington
561. $22,494 – Wilmont
562. $22,482 – Ulen
563. $22,481 – Lake Lillian
564. $22,473 – Shafer
565. $22,462 – Warroad
566. $22,453 – Brandon
567. $22,424 – Carlton
568. $22,415 – Gibbon
569. $22,390 – Morton
570. $22,375 – Flensburg
571. $22,363 – Brewster
572. $22,352 – Chokio
573. $22,309 – Brooten
574. $22,274 – Morristown
575. $22,262 – Humboldt
576. $22,246 – Ronneby
577. $22,237 – Cook
578. $22,237 – Harmony
579. $22,237 – Pierz
580. $22,225 – Le Center
581. $22,191 – Leonard
582. $22,163 – Lengby
583. $22,153 – Atwater
584. $22,145 – Howard Lake
585. $22,142 – Rushmore
586. $22,135 – Hills
587. $22,134 – Lake Benton
588. $22,106 – Kiester
589. $22,094 – Odessa
590. $22,089 – Goodridge
591. $22,062 – New York Mills
592. $22,032 – Osage
593. $22,015 – Lancaster
594. $22,001 – Heron Lake
595. $21,957 – Caledonia
596. $21,924 – Barnum
597. $21,909 – Little Falls
598. $21,896 – Millerville
599. $21,874 – Montgomery
600. $21,857 – Biwabik
601. $21,847 – Winona
602. $21,843 – Comfrey
603. $21,830 – Jasper
604. $21,819 – Aldrich
605. $21,814 – Kennedy
606. $21,729 – Backus
607. $21,724 – Holland
608. $21,682 – Frost
609. $21,672 – Buhl
610. $21,657 – Louisburg
611. $21,642 – International Falls
612. $21,634 – Alvarado
613. $21,609 – Tyler
614. $21,599 – Dovray
615. $21,598 – Browerville
616. $21,593 – Bingham Lake
617. $21,583 – Sanborn
618. $21,559 – Silver Lake
619. $21,552 – Riverton
620. $21,546 – Foley
621. $21,504 – Lismore
622. $21,488 – Dilworth
623. $21,470 – Twin Lakes (Mahnomen County)
624. $21,453 – St. James
625. $21,442 – Denham
626. $21,442 – St. Joseph
627. $21,435 – Elizabeth
628. $21,416 – West Concord
629. $21,414 – Scanlon
630. $21,414 – Garrison
631. $21,389 – Genola
632. $21,365 – New London
633. $21,312 – Dodge Center
634. $21,307 – Grand Rapids
635. $21,299 – Halstad
636. $21,297 – Lake Park
637. $21,284 – Millville
638. $21,281 – Rothsay
639. $21,273 – Buckman
640. $21,262 – Isle
641. $21,253 – Hartland
642. $21,227 – Badger
643. $21,225 – Bigelow
644. $21,215 – Osakis
645. $21,191 – Kensington
646. $21,166 – Fosston
647. $21,124 – Karlstad
648. $21,091 – Orr
649. $21,087 – Hill City
650. $21,062 – Oklee
651. $21,061 – Buffalo Lake
652. $21,058 – Raymond
653. $21,039 – Canby
654. $21,034 – Miltona
655. $21,030 – Pine City
656. $21,000 – New Germany
657. $20,990 – Round Lake
658. $20,966 – Belview
659. $20,957 – Kelliher
660. $20,937 – Emmons
661. $20,926 – Barrett
662. $20,903 – Evan
663. $20,881 – Bellechester
664. $20,879 – Kandiyohi
665. $20,855 – Deerwood
666. $20,846 – Welcome
667. $20,825 – Eveleth
668. $20,824 – Virginia
669. $20,822 – Brooklyn Center
670. $20,814 – Herman
671. $20,776 – Kingston
672. $20,764 – St. Anthony (Stearns County)
673. $20,763 – Tracy
674. $20,739 – Watkins
675. $20,736 – Barry
676. $20,734 – Lewisville
677. $20,727 – Audubon
678. $20,706 – Clarissa
679. $20,699 – Princeton
680. $20,671 – Longville
681. $20,661 – Clinton
682. $20,638 – Climax
683. $20,638 – Wright
684. $20,629 – Vining
685. $20,627 – Trommald
686. $20,623 – Ellsworth
687. $20,617 – Kasota
688. $20,607 – Murdock
689. $20,584 – Houston
690. $20,559 – Borup
691. $20,555 – Mapleton
692. $20,545 – Keewatin
693. $20,543 – Wykoff
694. $20,541 – Delavan
695. $20,518 – Kimball
696. $20,515 – Danube
697. $20,508 – Elmdale
698. $20,479 – Chisholm
699. $20,475 – Eden Valley
700. $20,471 – Wahkon
701. $20,459 – Kerkhoven
702. $20,443 – Mountain Lake
703. $20,429 – St. Peter
704. $20,399 – Perley
705. $20,397 – Okabena
706. $20,366 – Twin Lakes (Freeborn County)
707. $20,354 – Marietta
708. $20,322 – Tintah
709. $20,315 – Big Falls
710. $20,299 – Long Prairie
711. $20,284 – Cyrus
712. $20,279 – Baudette
713. $20,269 – New Richland
714. $20,211 – Clearbrook
715. $20,203 – Westbrook
716. $20,175 – Staples
717. $20,165 – Bricelyn
718. $20,150 – Browns Valley
719. $20,124 – Butterfield
720. $20,106 – Nimrod
721. $20,095 – Maynard
722. $20,054 – La Prairie
723. $20,032 – Park Rapids
724. $20,030 – Echo
725. $20,029 – Frazee
726. $20,022 – Rutledge
727. $20,020 – Magnolia
728. $19,978 – Randall
729. $19,968 – Hanley Falls
730. $19,958 – Bagley
731. $19,881 – Fertile
732. $19,876 – Doran
733. $19,862 – Ruthton
734. $19,818 – Worthington
735. $19,817 – Hazel Run
736. $19,789 – Williams
737. $19,748 – Shevlin
738. $19,687 – Mora
739. $19,660 – Hoffman
740. $19,652 – Rushford
741. $19,639 – Wadena
742. $19,620 – McGrath
743. $19,563 – Canton
744. $19,557 – Pequot Lakes
745. $19,543 – Onamia
746. $19,518 – Nassau
747. $19,513 – Tenstrike
748. $19,449 – Kettle River
749. $19,412 – Pine River
750. $19,410 – Gonvick
751. $19,397 – Brookston
752. $19,383 – Pease
753. $19,317 – Hinckley
754. $19,303 – Brainerd
755. $19,294 – Hewitt
756. $19,276 – Jeffers
757. $19,256 – Evansville
758. $19,252 – Hardwick
759. $19,251 – Mentor
760. $19,251 – Vesta
761. $19,245 – Bluffton
762. $19,244 – Watson
763. $19,241 – Bovey
764. $19,220 – Pillager
765. $19,215 – Shelly
766. $19,188 – Appleton
767. $19,158 – Gully
768. $19,155 – Melrose
769. $19,117 – Mapleview
770. $19,047 – Cromwell
771. $19,041 – Currie
772. $19,030 – Garvin
773. $19,012 – Meire Grove
774. $19,008 – St. Leo
775. $19,007 – De Graff
776. $18,995 – Bowlus
777. $18,943 – Federal Dam
778. $18,943 – Plummer
779. $18,918 – Viking
780. $18,914 – Grove City
781. $18,876 – Verndale
782. $18,860 – Dassel
783. $18,851 – Henning
784. $18,835 – Ceylon
785. $18,826 – Arco
786. $18,766 – Erskine
787. $18,744 – Twin Valley
788. $18,707 – Rush City
789. $18,657 – Deer Creek
790. $18,625 – Sebeka
791. $18,595 – Kilkenny
792. $18,543 – Bemidji
793. $18,498 – Hancock
794. $18,434 – Cobden
795. $18,342 – Beaulieu
796. $18,294 – Darfur
797. $18,279 – Mahnomen
798. $18,223 – Georgetown
799. $18,192 – Granada
800. $18,143 – Beaver Bay
801. $18,105 – Braham
802. $18,076 – Laporte
803. $18,056 – Floodwood
804. $18,052 – Brook Park
805. $17,997 – Boyd
806. $17,978 – Northrop
807. $17,911 – Parkers Prairie
808. $17,896 – Delhi
809. $17,895 – Strandquist
810. $17,864 – New Auburn
811. $17,859 – Seaforth
812. $17,859 – Marble
813. $17,833 – Pelican Rapids
814. $17,829 – Bertha
815. $17,803 – Spring Hill
816. $17,786 – Akeley
817. $17,767 – Sacred Heart
818. $17,750 – Northome
819. $17,693 – Menahga
820. $17,692 – Donaldson
821. $17,625 – Lake Bronson
822. $17,572 – Bock
823. $17,532 – Grasston
824. $17,432 – Lansing
825. $17,337 – Clitherall
826. $17,326 – Nevis
827. $17,156 – Calumet
828. $17,104 – Hackensack
829. $16,993 – Moose Lake
830. $16,955 – Ogema
831. $16,943 – Sturgeon Lake
832. $16,816 – Milan
833. $16,684 – Woodstock
834. $16,628 – Callaway
835. $16,579 – Winger
836. $16,530 – Steen
837. $16,519 – Westport
838. $16,517 – Harding
839. $16,488 – Kenneth
840. $16,443 – Cass Lake
841. $16,362 – Waubun
842. $16,361 – Winton
843. $16,336 – Ironton
844. $16,216 – Blackduck
845. $16,199 – Wolf Lake
846. $16,149 – Taunton
847. $16,118 – Elmore
848. $16,020 – Henriette
849. $15,987 – Hammond
850. $15,946 – Ball Club
851. $15,836 – Deer River
852. $15,749 – Meadowlands
853. $15,748 – Inger
854. $15,630 – Remer
855. $15,628 – South Haven
856. $15,453 – Ebro
857. $15,423 – Hilltop
858. $15,211 – Elba
859. $15,189 – Sandstone
860. $15,097 – Pennock
861. $14,913 – Ogilvie
862. $14,800 – Correll
863. $14,780 – Dalton
864. $14,729 – Nashua
865. $14,729 – Urbank
866. $14,716 – Revere
867. $14,547 – West Roy Lake
868. $14,510 – McGregor
869. $14,490 – Motley
870. $14,484 – Farwell
871. $14,478 – Hillman
872. $14,420 – Walnut Grove
873. $14,329 – Mizpah
874. $14,189 – Bruno
875. $14,057 – Solway
876. $14,049 – Zemple
877. $13,872 – Trail
878. $13,189 – Effie
879. $13,158 – Elbow Lake (Becker County)
880. $12,899 – Nett Lake
881. $12,739 – Quamba
882. $12,543 – Vineland
883. $12,411 – Bejou
884. $12,366 – Landfall
885. $12,340 – Redby
886. $12,274 – Walters
887. $12,124 – Leonidas
888. $10,990 – Red Lake
889. $10,915 – Bena
890. $10,114 – Boy River
891. $10,087 – Naytahwaush
892. $9,730 – Little Rock (Beltrami County)
893. $9,716 – Myrtle
894. $9,359 – Rice Lake (Clearwater County)
895. $8,951 – Mahnomen (St. Louis County)
896. $8,597 – White Earth
897. $7,432 – Pine Point
898. $7,367 – Midway (Mahnomen County)
899. $7,173 – Riverland
900. $6,078 – Ponemah
901. $3,323 – The Ranch
