= Trimont, Minnesota =

City in Minnesota, United States

- City
- Location in Martin County and the state of Minnesota
- Coordinates: 43°45′40″N 94°42′58″W
- Country: United States
- State: Minnesota
- County: Martin

Area
  - Total: 0.79 sq mi (2.04 km^{2})
  - Land: 0.79 sq mi (2.04 km^{2})
  - Water: 0 sq mi (0.00 km^{2})
- Elevation: 1,240 ft (380 m)

Population (2020)
  - Total: 705
  - Density: 897/sq mi (346.4/km^{2})
- Time zone: UTC-6 (Central (CST))
  - Summer (DST): UTC-5 (CDT)
- ZIP code: 56176
- Area code: 507
- FIPS code: 27-65470
- GNIS feature ID: 2397054
- Website: https://trimontmn.com/

Trimont is a city in Martin County, Minnesota, United States. The population was 705 at the 2020 census. The small community is located in southern Minnesota between Sherburn and St. James on Minnesota State Highway 4.

== History ==
Trimont was once two separate villages, platted by competing railroads. The two towns were Triumph to the east, and Monterey to the west. In a 1959 referendum, the two towns voted to merge, using the first letters from each town's name to form, originally "Tri-Mont", and later simplified to "Trimont". As a result of the merger, Trimont has the unique characteristic of two separate Main Street business districts which are on the same street, yet located approximately a half-mile apart.

== Geography ==
Trimont is in northeastern Martin County along Minnesota Highway 4, which leads north 6 miles (10 km) to Ormsby and south 8 miles (13 km) to Sherburn. Fairmont, the Martin county seat, is 19 miles (31 km) to the southeast.

According to the U.S. Census Bureau, Trimont has a total area of 0.79 square miles (2.05 km^{2}), all land.

== Demographics ==
Historical population
Census	Pop.	Note	%±
1940	791		—
1950	876		10.7%
1960	942		7.5%
1970	835		−11.4%
1980	805		−3.6%
1990	745		−7.5%
2000	754		1.2%
2010	747		−0.9%
2020	705		−5.6%
U.S. Decennial Census

=== 2010 census ===
As of the census of 2010, there were 747 people, 310 households, and 186 families residing in the city. The population density was 1,009.5 inhabitants per square mile (389.8/km^{2}). There were 348 housing units at an average density of 470.3 per square mile (181.6/km^{2}). The racial makeup of the city was 97.9% White, 0.1% African American, 0.3% Native American, 0.3% Asian, 0.8% from other races, and 0.7% from two or more races. Hispanic or Latino of any race were 0.8% of the population.

There were 310 households, of which 30.6% had children under the age of 18 living with them, 46.1% were married couples living together, 8.7% had a female householder with no husband present, 5.2% had a male householder with no wife present, and 40.0% were non-families. 37.4% of all households were made up of individuals, and 21.3% had someone living alone who was 65 years of age or older. The average household size was 2.27 and the average family size was 2.99.

The median age in the city was 45.1 years. 24.8% of residents were under the age of 18; 5.8% were between the ages of 18 and 24; 19.1% were from 25 to 44; 25.8% were from 45 to 64; and 24.5% were 65 years of age or older. The gender makeup of the city was 46.7% male and 53.3% female.

=== 2000 census ===
As of the census of 2000, there were 754 people, 322 households, and 199 families residing in the city. The population density was 980.3 inhabitants per square mile (378.5/km^{2}). There were 356 housing units at an average density of 462.9 per square mile (178.7/km^{2}). The racial makeup of the city was 98.01% White, 0.53% African American, 0.27% Native American, 0.13% Asian, and 1.06% from two or more races. Hispanic or Latino of any race were 0.40% of the population.

There were 322 households, out of which 27.0% had children under the age of 18 living with them, 52.5% were married couples living together, 8.4% had a female householder with no husband present, and 37.9% were non-families. 35.7% of all households were made up of individuals, and 20.5% had someone living alone who was 65 years of age or older. The average household size was 2.22 and the average family size was 2.89.

In the city, the population was spread out, with 22.8% under the age of 18, 4.2% from 18 to 24, 21.5% from 25 to 44, 22.9% from 45 to 64, and 28.5% who were 65 years of age or older. The median age was 46 years. For every 100 females, there were 83.5 males. For every 100 females age 18 and over, there were 80.2 males.

The median income for a household in the city was $28,125, and the median income for a family was $40,000. Males had a median income of $30,682 versus $21,667 for females. The per capita income for the city was $19,819. About 9.6% of families and 11.5% of the population were below the poverty line, including 11.4% of those under age 18 and 13.7% of those age 65 or over.

== Education ==
In 1988, Trimont Schools consolidated with neighboring Sherburn and Welcome to form the Martin County West (MCW) School District. The Trimont school building is now the MCW Trimont Elementary. (Grades kindergarten, 3rd - 6th grades.)
