= Minnesota State Highway 124 =

State highway in Minnesota, United States

Trunk Highway 124
- MN 124 highlighted in red

Route information
- Maintained by MnDOT
- Length: 1 mi (1.6 km)
- Existed: 1961–2002

Major junctions
- South end: MN 4 / MN 55 in Paynesville
- North end: MN 23 in Paynesville

Location
- Country: United States
- State: Minnesota

Highway system
- Minnesota Trunk Highway System; Interstate; US; State; Legislative; Scenic
← MN 123	→ MN 127

Minnesota State Highway 124 (MN 124) was a state highway in Paynesville, running along Lake Avenue between Highways 4 / 55 and Highway 23.

== Route description ==
Highway 124 was less than 1 mile in length and followed Lake Avenue, the main street through the city of Paynesville.

Up to Highway 23, Lake Avenue was the original routing of Highways 4 and 55 through Paynesville until 1953 when a new alignment was built, bypassing the main part of town to the south. At that time, Highway 55 was routed on the new alignment, while Highway 4 remained on the existing alignment through town. In 1961, Highway 4 was switched to run concurrently with Highway 55, and the stretch of Lake Avenue that was formerly Highway 4 became Highway 124.

The entire route was located in Stearns County.

== History ==
Highway 124 was created in 1961, from the former route of State Highway 4.

Highway 124 remained part of the state highway system until 2002, when it was turned back to Stearns County maintenance as an extension of County State Aid Highway (CSAH) 66.

== Major intersections ==
The entire route was in Paynesville, Stearns County.

mi	km	Destinations	Notes
		MN 4 / MN 55	Southern terminus
		CSAH 34	
		MN 23	Northern terminus
1.000 mi = 1.609 km; 1.000 km = 0.621 mi
