= Minnesota State Highway 55 =

State highway in Minnesota, United States

Trunk Highway 55
- MN 55 highlighted in red

Route information
- Maintained by MnDOT
- Length: 220.572 mi (354.976 km)
- Existed: 1933–present
- Tourist routes: Great River Road

Major junctions
- West end: ND 11 at the Bois de Sioux River near Fairmount, ND
- US 75 near Tenney; US 59 / MN 79 in Elbow Lake; US 71 in Belgrade; MN 4 / MN 23 in Paynesville; I-494 in Plymouth; US 169 in Golden Valley; MN 100 in Golden Valley; I-94 / US 52 in Minneapolis; MN 5 / MN 62 in Fort Snelling; US 52 in Rosemount
- East end: US 61 in Hastings

Location
- Country: United States
- State: Minnesota
- Counties: Wilkin, Grant, Douglas, Pope, Stearns, Kandiyohi, Meeker, Wright, Hennepin, Dakota

Highway system
- Minnesota Trunk Highway System; Interstate; US; State; Legislative; Scenic
← MN 54	→ MN 56

Minnesota State Highway 55 (MN 55) is a state highway that runs 221 miles (356 km) across the central part of state taking a diagonal route from its western most at the North Dakota state line near Tenney to its easternmost point at the intersection with U.S. Highway 61 (US 61) in Hastings. In Minneapolis and Golden Valley, portions of the route are also signed as Olson Memorial Highway.

== Route description ==
MN 55 serves as a northwest–southeast route between Elbow Lake, Glenwood, Paynesville, Annandale, Buffalo, Plymouth, Minneapolis, Mendota Heights, and Hastings.

MN 55 begins at the Bois de Sioux River, at the Minnesota—North Dakota state line near Tenney. North Dakota Highway 11 (ND 11) is its counterpoint upon crossing the state line. MN 55 continues east to Tenney, Nashua, and Wendell. The route has a junction with U.S. Highway 59 (US 59) before entering the city of Elbow Lake. US 59/MN 55 runs concurrently for 11 miles (18 km) until reaching Barrett.

MN 55 then continues independently again to Hoffman, Kensington, Farwell, and Lowry before reaching the city of Glenwood. At Glenwood, MN 55 has an intersection with MN 29 and an interchange with MN 28.

The route continues southeast to Sedan and Brooten before reaching its junction with US 71 in Belgrade. MN 55 passes through Regal before reaching its junction with MN 4 and MN 23 at the city of Paynesville.

MN 55 continues east to Eden Valley and Watkins before reaching its junction with MN 15 at Kimball.

The route has a junction with MN 24 in Annandale. MN 55 continues to Maple Lake and then Buffalo, where it has a junction with MN 25.

MN 55 enters the Twin Cities area at Rockford and Greenfield, continuing east to Medina and Plymouth. MN 55 has a junction with Interstate 494 (I-494) in Plymouth. MN 55 continues east and has a junction with US 169 at the Plymouth–Golden Valley boundary line. MN 55 continues through Golden Valley to its junction with MN 100. The route then continues east and enters the city of Minneapolis.

The highway has been designated Olson Memorial Highway, named for Floyd B. Olson, a popular Minnesota governor of Norwegian ancestry. Olson grew up in North Minneapolis, near where the highway runs. While the entire route is designated as the Olson Memorial Highway, it is only consistently signed as such between Interstate 494 and N 7th Street in Minneapolis. The part of MN 55 southeast of downtown is known as Hiawatha Avenue. Light rail trains on the Blue Line, and Little Earth Trail and Hiawatha LRT Trail for bicyclists/pedestrians, run parallel to the highway for much of the Hiawatha Avenue stretch.

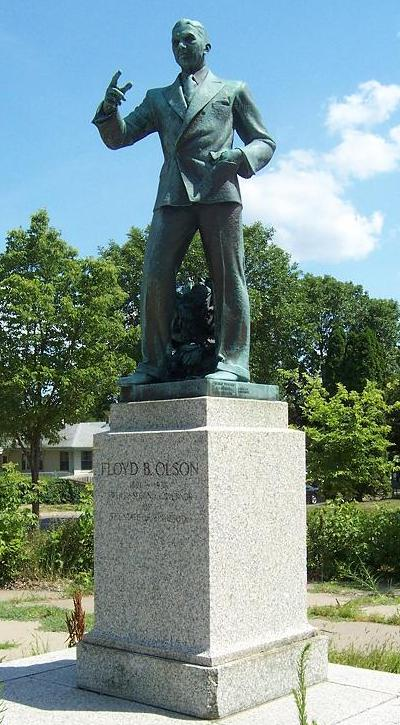
Olson Memorial Highway statue

MN 55 runs concurrently along I-94/US 52. MN 55 exits just before downtown at the westbound I-94/northbound US 52 exit, and leaves the concurrency at the exit for the Olson Highway, marked with the MN 55 shield. Eastbound, MN 55 leaves the Olson Highway at the interchange for I-94 eastbound/US 52 southbound, and leaves the freeway at the exit for Hiawatha Avenue, which is also marked with the MN 55 shield.

There has been some controversy with expansion of the highway. An area known as Camp Coldwater, considered by some as the "birthplace of Minnesota", was dug up during some construction. MN 55 joins with MN 62 at this point.

Fort Snelling State Park is located near the junction of MN 55 and MN 5. The park entrance is located on MN 5 at Post Road.

MN 55 crosses the Minnesota River via the Mendota Bridge, which was the longest continuous bridge made of poured concrete when it was completed in 1926. It is 4,119 feet (1,255 m) in length.

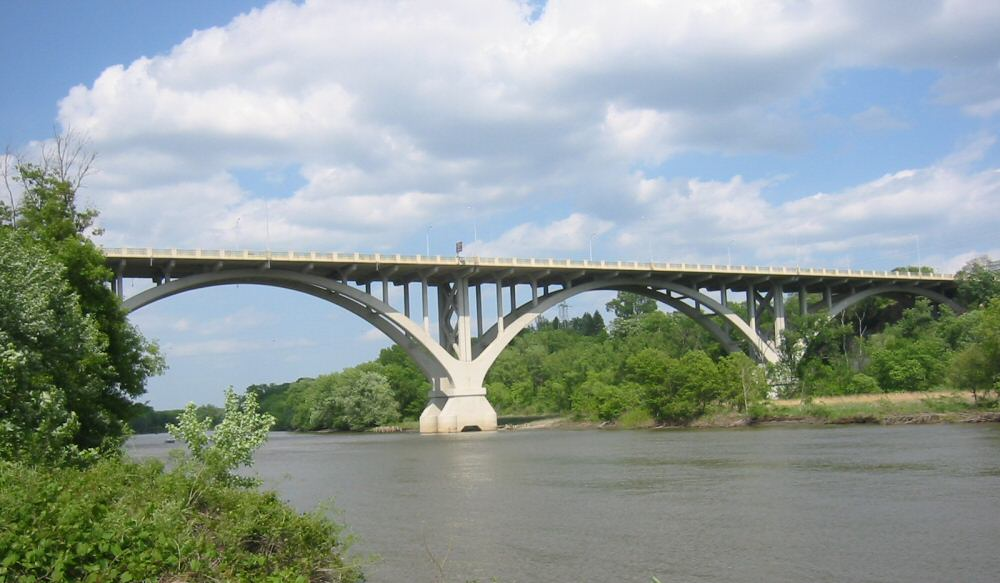
The Mendota Bridge between Fort Snelling and Mendota Heights carries MN 55 over the Minnesota River

The route enters Mendota Heights, diverges from MN 62, and then has a junction with MN 13.

MN 55 continues southeast through Eagan, joining briefly with MN 149. The route then has a junction with MN 3 in Inver Grove Heights. MN 55 then runs concurrently with US 52 through Inver Grove Heights and into Rosemount. At Rosemount, MN 55 leaves US 52. MN 55 continues independently again to its eastern terminus at its intersection with US 61 in the city of Hastings.

== History ==
MN 55 was authorized in 1933.

The original alignment for MN 55 in Minneapolis was along old US 52 (now County State-Aid Highway 81, CSAH 81) to Rockford Road, then Rockford Road to MN 55's present-day alignment (now CSAH 9). The present-day alignment was constructed in the early 1950s.

In July 2005, the section of MN 55 that runs through downtown Minneapolis was turned back to local maintenance. To fill the gap, MN 55 was rerouted along I-94/US 52.

== Major intersections ==
County	Location	mi	km	Destinations	Notes
Bois de Sioux River		0.000	0.000	ND 11 west – Fairmount	Continuation into North Dakota
Bois de Sioux River		0.000	0.000	North Dakota–Minnesota state line	
Wilkin	Campbell Township	3.496	5.626	US 75 – Wheaton, Breckenridge	
Wilkin	Champion Township	10.706	17.230	MN 9 – Morris, Breckenridge	
Grant	Pomme de Terre Township	27.832	44.791	US 59 north – Fergus Falls	Western end of US 59 overlap
Grant	Elbow Lake	31.230	50.260	MN 79 east – Evansville, Alexandria	Western terminus of MN 79; access to Elbow Lake Medical Center
Grant	Elbow Lake	31.892	51.325	CSAH 54 south – Herman	Former MN 54
Grant	Barrett	38.820	62.475	US 59 south – Morris	Eastern end of US 59 overlap
Grant	Hoffman	45.686	73.524	MN 27 – Wheaton, Alexandria	
Douglas	No major junctions				
Pope	Ben Wade Township	61.135	98.387	MN 114 north – Garfield	Western end of MN 114 overlap
Pope	Lowry	61.798	99.454	MN 114 south – Starbuck	Eastern end of MN 114 overlap
Pope	Reno Township	68.804	110.729	MN 29 – Glenwood, Alexandria	
Pope	Glenwood	70.914	114.125	MN 28 – Glenwood, Sauk Centre, Morris	Interchange
Stearns	Belgrade	93.643	150.704	US 71 south – Willmar	Western end of US 71 overlap
Stearns	Crow River Township	94.636	152.302	US 71 north – Sauk Centre	Eastern end of US 71 overlap
Kandiyohi	Roseville Township	105.917	170.457	MN 4 north – Meire Grove	Western end of MN 4 overlap
Stearns	Paynesville	108.205	174.139	MN 23 – Willmar, St. Cloud	Interchange
Stearns	Paynesville	109.527	176.267	CSAH 66 (Lake Avenue)	Former MN 124; access to CentraCare Paynesville Hospital
Meeker	Union Grove Township	113.487	182.640	MN 4 south – Grove City	Eastern end of MN 4 overlap
Meeker	Eden Valley	119.497	192.312	MN 22 – Litchfield, Richmond	
Stearns	Kimball	131.977	212.396	MN 15 / MN 24 south – Dassel, St. Cloud	Western end of MN 24 overlap
Wright	Annandale	141.622	227.919	MN 24 north – Clearwater	Eastern end of MN 24 overlap
Wright	Buffalo	155.195	249.762	MN 25 (Central Avenue) – Monticello	Access to Buffalo Hospital
Hennepin	Medina	176.393	283.877	CSAH 101 north (Sioux Drive)	Former MN 101 north
Hennepin	Plymouth	177.572	285.774	CSAH 101 south (Peony Lane) – Wayzata	Former MN 101 south
Hennepin	Plymouth	180.515	290.511	I-494	Interchange; I-494 Exit 22
Hennepin	Plymouth–Golden Valley line	183.052	294.594	US 169	Interchange
Hennepin	Golden Valley	186.600	300.304	MN 100	Interchange; MN 100 exit 9
Hennepin	Minneapolis	189.640	305.196	I-94 west (US 52)	Western end of I-94 overlap; I-94 exit 230
Hennepin	Minneapolis	See I-94			
Hennepin	Minneapolis	191.887	308.812	I-94 east (US 52 / US 12)	Eastern end of I-94 overlap; I-94 exit 234A
Hennepin	Minneapolis	191.944	308.904	I-35W north / 7th Street / 3rd Street / Washington Avenue – University of Minnesota	Westbound left exit and eastbound left entrance
Hennepin	Minneapolis	192.619	309.990	To CSAH 5 (Franklin Avenue) / CSAH 152 (Cedar Avenue)	Interchange
Hennepin	Minneapolis	193.521	311.442	CSAH 3 (East Lake Street)	SPUI interchange
Hennepin	Minneapolis	195.527	314.670	CSAH 46 (46th Street) / Great River Road (National Route)	Western end of Great River Road overlap
Hennepin	Unorganized Territory of Fort Snelling	197.430	317.733	MN 62 west (Crosstown Highway)	Interchange; western end MN 62 overlap
Hennepin	Unorganized Territory of Fort Snelling	198.052	318.734	CSAH 204 south (Bloomington Road)	Fort Snelling Historic Site signed westbound
Hennepin	Unorganized Territory of Fort Snelling	198.373	319.250	MN 5 – Minneapolis–Saint Paul International Airport, St. Paul	
Minnesota River		198.424– 199.204	319.332– 320.588	Mendota Bridge	
Dakota	Mendota Heights	199.357	320.834	MN 62 east	Eastern end of MN 62 overlap; eastbound exit and westbound entrance
Dakota	Mendota Heights	200.141	322.096	MN 13 / Great River Road (National Route)	At-grade intersection; Eastern end Great River Road overlap
Dakota	Eagan	202.409	325.746	MN 149 north (Dodd Road north) to I-494	Western end of MN 149 overlap
Dakota	Eagan	202.943	326.605	MN 149 south (Dodd Road south)	Eastern end of MN 149 overlap
Dakota	Inver Grove Heights	205.005	329.924	MN 3 (South Robert Trail)	
Dakota	Inver Grove Heights	206.421	332.202	CR 73 (Barnes Avenue)	Eastbound exit and westbound entrance
Dakota	Inver Grove Heights	206.753	332.737	US 52 north (Lafayette Freeway) – St. Paul	Western end of US 52 overlap; westbound exit and eastbound entrance
Dakota	Inver Grove Heights	328.733	529.044	CSAH 56 (Concord Boulevard) / Great River Road (National Route)	Former MN 56; western end of Great River Road overlap
Dakota	Inver Grove Heights–Rosemount line	210.290	338.429	117th Street	
Dakota	Rosemount	211.074	339.691	US 52 south – Rochester	Eastern end of US 52 overlap; eastern end of freeway section; interchange eastbound, access via connector road westbound
Dakota	Rosemount	213.919	344.269	CSAH 42 west (142nd Street) – Rosemount	Western end of CSAH 42 overlap
Dakota	Nininger Township	215.689	347.118	CSAH 85 south / CSAH 42 east / Great River Road (National Route)	Eastern end of CSAH 42 and Great River Road overlap
Dakota	Hastings	220.572	354.976	US 61 / Great River Road – Red Wing	Eastern terminus
1.000 mi = 1.609 km; 1.000 km = 0.621 mi: Concurrency terminus
