= Dunnell, Minnesota =

City in Minnesota, United States

- City
- Location in Martin County and the state of Minnesota
- Coordinates: 43°33′38″N 94°46′31″W
- Country: United States
- State: Minnesota
- County: Martin

Government
  - Mayor: Dan Nelson

Area
  - Total: 0.15 sq mi (0.40 km^{2})
  - Land: 0.15 sq mi (0.40 km^{2})
  - Water: 0 sq mi (0.00 km^{2})
- Elevation: 1,319 ft (402 m)

Population (2020)
  - Total: 133
  - Density: 868.6/sq mi (335.37/km^{2})
- Time zone: UTC-6 (Central (CST))
  - Summer (DST): UTC-5 (CDT)
- ZIP code: 56127
- Area code: 507
- FIPS code: 27-17180
- GNIS feature ID: 2394579

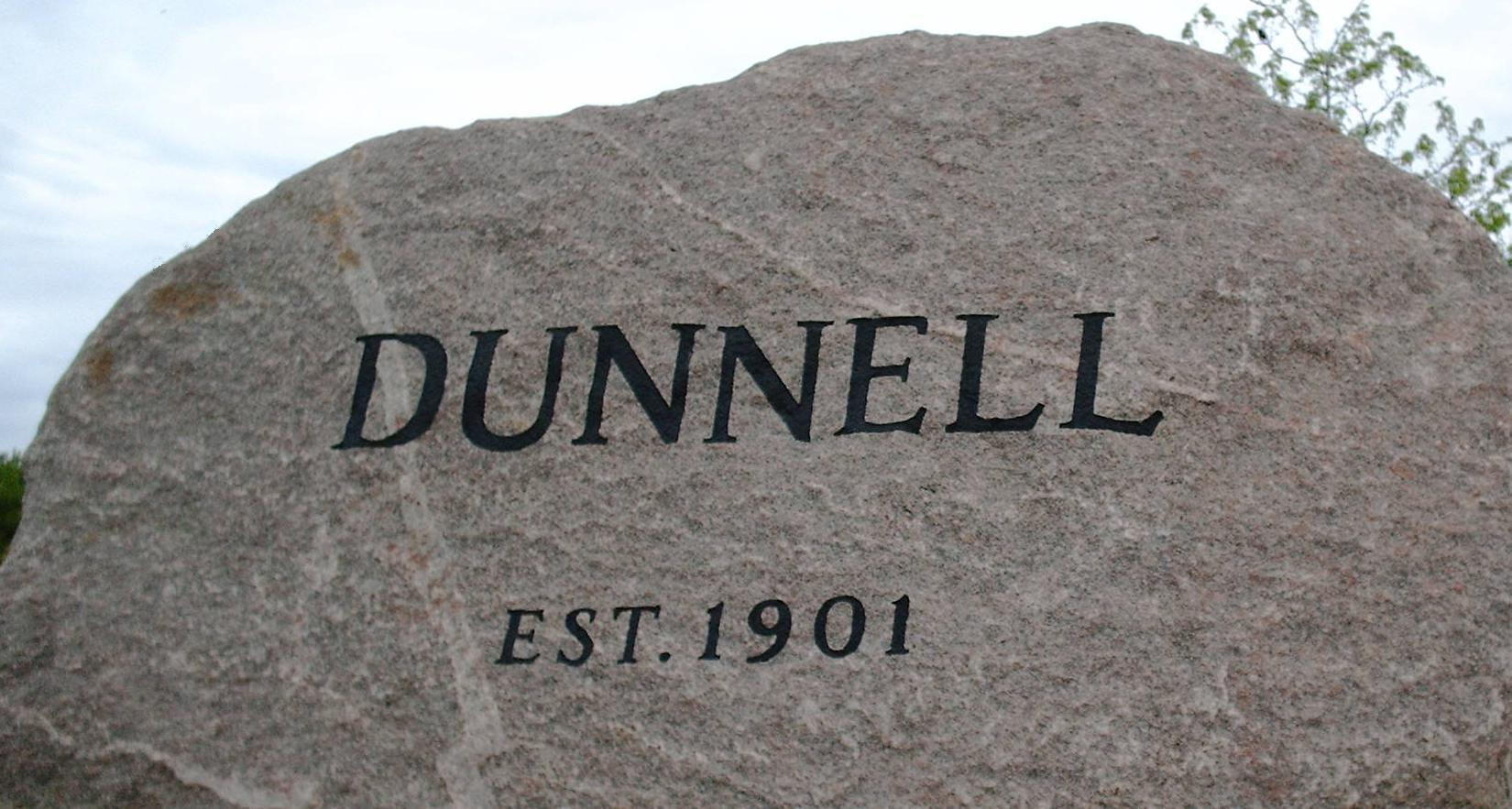
Dunnell sign

Dunnell is a city in Martin County, Minnesota, United States. The population was 133 at the 2020 census, down from 167 in 2010.

== History ==
A post office called Dunnell has been in operation since 1873. The city was named for Mark H. Dunnell, a member of the U.S. House of Representatives from Minnesota.

== Geography ==
The community is located in southwestern Martin County along Minnesota State Highway 4, which leads north 8 miles (13 km) to Sherburn and south 12 miles (19 km) to Estherville, Iowa. Interstate 90 is accessible from Sherburn.

According to the U.S. Census Bureau, the city has a total area of 0.15 square miles (0.39 km^{2}), all land.

== Demographics ==
Historical population
Census	Pop.	Note	%±
1910	170		—
1920	247		45.3%
1930	237		−4.0%
1940	239		0.8%
1950	242		1.3%
1960	260		7.4%
1970	237		−8.8%
1980	216		−8.9%
1990	187		−13.4%
2000	197		5.3%
2010	167		−15.2%
2020	133		−20.4%
U.S. Decennial Census

=== 2010 census ===
As of the census of 2010, there were 167 people, 80 households, and 50 families living in the city. The population density was 439.5 inhabitants per square mile (169.7/km^{2}). There were 88 housing units at an average density of 231.6 per square mile (89.4/km^{2}). The racial makeup of the city was 98.2% White and 1.8% Native American. Hispanic or Latino of any race were 1.8% of the population.

There were 80 households, of which 17.5% had children under the age of 18 living with them, 56.3% were married couples living together, 5.0% had a female householder with no husband present, 1.3% had a male householder with no wife present, and 37.5% were non-families. 30.0% of all households were made up of individuals, and 8.8% had someone living alone who was 65 years of age or older. The average household size was 2.09 and the average family size was 2.56.

The median age in the city was 51.8 years. 14.4% of residents were under the age of 18; 3% were between the ages of 18 and 24; 20.4% were from 25 to 44; 40.2% were from 45 to 64; and 22.2% were 65 years of age or older. The gender makeup of the city was 54.5% male and 45.5% female.

=== 2000 census ===
As of the census of 2000, there were 197 people, 83 households, and 52 families living in the city. The population density was 521.9 inhabitants per square mile (201.5/km^{2}). There were 92 housing units at an average density of 243.7 per square mile (94.1/km^{2}). The racial makeup of the city was 98.98% White, and 1.02% from two or more races.

There were 83 households, out of which 34.9% had children under the age of 18 living with them, 49.4% were married couples living together, 6.0% had a female householder with no husband present, and 37.3% were non-families. 34.9% of all households were made up of individuals, and 14.5% had someone living alone who was 65 years of age or older. The average household size was 2.37 and the average family size was 3.10.

In the city, the population was spread out, with 25.9% under the age of 18, 8.1% from 18 to 24, 27.4% from 25 to 44, 20.8% from 45 to 64, and 17.8% who were 65 years of age or older. The median age was 40 years. For every 100 females, there were 109.6 males. For every 100 females age 18 and over, there were 121.2 males.
