= Spring Hill, Minnesota =

City in Minnesota, United States

Spring Hill
- City
- Location of Spring Hill within Stearns County, Minnesota
- Coordinates: 45°31′24″N 94°49′54″W
- Country: United States
- State: Minnesota
- County: Stearns

Area
  - Total: 0.73 sq mi (1.88 km^{2})
  - Land: 0.73 sq mi (1.88 km^{2})
  - Water: 0 sq mi (0.00 km^{2})
- Elevation: 1,250 ft (380 m)

Population (2020)
  - Total: 68
  - Density: 93.5/sq mi (36.09/km^{2})
- Time zone: UTC-6 (Central (CST))
  - Summer (DST): UTC-5 (CDT)
- FIPS code: 27-61888
- GNIS feature ID: 2395932

Spring Hill is a city in Stearns County, Minnesota, United States. As of the 2020 census, Spring Hill had a population of 68. It is part of the St. Cloud Metropolitan Statistical Area.

Minnesota State Highway 4 serves as a main route in the community.

== Geography ==
According to the United States Census Bureau, the city has a total area of 0.72 square miles (1.86 km^{2}), all land.

== Demographics ==
Historical population
| Census | Pop. | Note | %± |
|---|---|---|---|
| 1910 | 100 | | — |
| 1920 | 112 | | 12.0% |
| 1930 | 102 | | −8.9% |
| 1940 | 87 | | −14.7% |
| 1950 | 91 | | 4.6% |
| 1960 | 105 | | 15.4% |
| 1970 | 90 | | −14.3% |
| 1980 | 94 | | 4.4% |
| 1990 | 77 | | −18.1% |
| 2000 | 55 | | −28.6% |
| 2010 | 85 | | 54.5% |
| 2020 | 68 | | −20.0% |
U.S. Decennial Census

=== 2010 census ===
As of the census of 2010, there were 85 people, 34 households, and 22 families living in the city. The population density was 118.1 inhabitants per square mile (45.6/km^{2}). There were 39 housing units at an average density of 54.2 per square mile (20.9/km^{2}). The racial makeup of the city was 100.0% White.

There were 34 households, of which 29.4% had children under the age of 18 living with them, 52.9% were married couples living together, 5.9% had a female householder with no husband present, 5.9% had a male householder with no wife present, and 35.3% were non-families. 32.4% of all households were made up of individuals, and 26.5% had someone living alone who was 65 years of age or older. The average household size was 2.50 and the average family size was 3.09.

The median age in the city was 44.8 years. 22.4% of residents were under the age of 18; 7% were between the ages of 18 and 24; 21.2% were from 25 to 44; 24.7% were from 45 to 64; and 24.7% were 65 years of age or older. The gender makeup of the city was 49.4% male and 50.6% female.

=== 2000 census ===
As of the census of 2000, there were 55 people, 26 households, and 12 families living in the city. The population density was 75.4 inhabitants per square mile (29.1/km^{2}). There were 26 housing units at an average density of 35.7 per square mile (13.8/km^{2}). The racial makeup of the city was 100.00% White.

There were 26 households, out of which 11.5% had children under the age of 18 living with them, 34.6% were married couples living together, 11.5% had a female householder with no husband present, and 53.8% were non-families. 46.2% of all households were made up of individuals, and 30.8% had someone living alone who was 65 years of age or older. The average household size was 2.12 and the average family size was 3.17.

In the city, the population was spread out, with 16.4% under the age of 18, 10.9% from 18 to 24, 23.6% from 25 to 44, 23.6% from 45 to 64, and 25.5% who were 65 years of age or older. The median age was 44 years. For every 100 females, there were 89.7 males. For every 100 females age 18 and over, there were 84.0 males.

The median income for a household in the city was $25,833, and the median income for a family was $43,125. Males had a median income of $24,375 versus $16,250 for females. The per capita income for the city was $16,271. There were no families and 11.9% of the population living below the poverty line, including no under eighteens and 29.4% of those over 64.
