= Greenwald, Minnesota =

City in Minnesota, United States

Greenwald
- City
- Location of Greenwald within Stearns County, Minnesota
- Coordinates: 45°36′N 94°52′W
- Country: United States
- State: Minnesota
- County: Stearns

Area
  - Total: 0.71 sq mi (1.85 km^{2})
  - Land: 0.71 sq mi (1.85 km^{2})
  - Water: 0 sq mi (0.00 km^{2})
- Elevation: 1,266 ft (386 m)

Population (2020)
  - Total: 197
  - Density: 276.4/sq mi (106.72/km^{2})
- Time zone: UTC-6 (Central (CST))
  - Summer (DST): UTC-5 (CDT)
- ZIP code: 56335
- Area code: 320
- FIPS code: 27-25874
- GNIS feature ID: 2394998

Greenwald is a city in Stearns County, Minnesota, United States. As of the 2020 census, Greenwald had a population of 197. It is part of the St. Cloud Metropolitan Statistical Area.

Minnesota State Highway 4 serves as a main route in the community and Interstate 94 passes nearby.

== History ==
A post office called Greenwald has been in operation since 1910. Greenwald is a name partially derived from German, wald meaning "forest".

== Geography ==
According to the United States Census Bureau, the city has a total area of 0.72 square miles (1.86 km^{2}), all land.

The city of Greenwald is located within Grove Township geographically but is a separate entity.

== Demographics ==
Historical population
Census	Pop.	Note	%±
1920	153		—
1930	237		54.9%
1940	233		−1.7%
1950	207		−11.2%
1960	266		28.5%
1970	244		−8.3%
1980	259		6.1%
1990	209		−19.3%
2000	201		−3.8%
2010	222		10.4%
2020	197		−11.3%
U.S. Decennial Census

=== 2010 census ===
At the 2010 census, there were 222 people, 98 households and 66 families living in the city. The population density was 308.3 inhabitants per square mile (119.0/km^{2}). There were 104 housing units at an average density of 144.4 per square mile (55.8/km^{2}). The racial makeup of the city was 100.0% White. Hispanic or Latino of any race were 0.9% of the population.

There were 98 households, of which 23.5% had children under the age of 18 living with them, 62.2% were married couples living together, 1.0% had a female householder with no husband present, 4.1% had a male householder with no wife present, and 32.7% were non-families. 29.6% of all households were made up of individuals, and 12.3% had someone living alone who was 65 years of age or older. The average household size was 2.27 and the average family size was 2.77.

The median age was 51.2 years. 20.7% of residents were under the age of 18; 3.7% were between the ages of 18 and 24; 19.8% were from 25 to 44; 34.3% were from 45 to 64; and 21.6% were 65 years of age or older. The gender makeup of the city was 52.7% male and 47.3% female.

=== 2000 census ===
At the 2000 census, there were 201 people, 85 households and 61 families living in the city. The population density was 260.2 inhabitants per square mile (100.5/km^{2}). There were 89 housing units at an average density of 115.2 per square mile (44.5/km^{2}). The racial makeup of the city was 100.00% White.

There were 85 households, of which 21.2% had children under the age of 18 living with them, 63.5% were married couples living together, 2.4% had a female householder with no husband present, and 27.1% were non-families. 21.2% of all households were made up of individuals, and 12.9% had someone living alone who was 65 years of age or older. The average household size was 2.36 and the average family size was 2.77.

16.9% of the population were under the age of 18, 11.4% from 18 to 24, 17.9% from 25 to 44, 26.9% from 45 to 64, and 26.9% who were 65 years of age or older. The median age was 46 years. For every 100 females, there were 103.0 males. For every 100 females age 18 and over, there were 103.7 males.

The median household income was $37,000 and the median family income was $42,125. Males had a median income of $31,923 versus $21,071 for females. The per capita income for the city was $17,539. None of the families and 2.4% of the population were living below the poverty line, including no under eighteens and 11.1% of those over 64.
