= Lake Henry, Minnesota =

City in Minnesota, United States

Lake Henry
- City
- Location of Lake Henry within Stearns County, Minnesota
- Coordinates: 45°27′43″N 94°47′47″W
- Country: United States
- State: Minnesota
- County: Stearns

Area
  - Total: 0.20 sq mi (0.51 km^{2})
  - Land: 0.20 sq mi (0.51 km^{2})
  - Water: 0 sq mi (0.00 km^{2})
- Elevation: 1,309 ft (399 m)

Population (2020)
  - Total: 72
  - Density: 364.0/sq mi (140.53/km^{2})
- Time zone: UTC-6 (Central (CST))
  - Summer (DST): UTC-5 (CDT)
- FIPS code: 27-34478
- GNIS feature ID: 2395591

Lake Henry is a city in Stearns County, Minnesota, United States. As of the 2020 census, Lake Henry had a population of 72. It is part of the St. Cloud Metropolitan Statistical Area.

Minnesota State Highway 4 serves as a main route in the community.

== Geography ==
According to the United States Census Bureau, the city has a total area of 0.20 square miles (0.52 km^{2}), all land.

== Demographics ==
Historical population
Census	Pop.	Note	%±
1920	197		—
1930	95		−51.8%
1940	89		−6.3%
1950	97		9.0%
1960	91		−6.2%
1970	92		1.1%
1980	90		−2.2%
1990	90		0.0%
2000	90		0.0%
2010	103		14.4%
2020	72		−30.1%
U.S. Decennial Census

=== 2010 census ===
As of the census of 2010, there were 103 people, 47 households, and 22 families living in the city. The population density was 515.0 inhabitants per square mile (198.8/km^{2}). There were 52 housing units at an average density of 260.0 per square mile (100.4/km^{2}). The racial makeup of the city was 100.0% White.

There were 47 households, of which 25.5% had children under the age of 18 living with them, 38.3% were married couples living together, 4.3% had a female householder with no husband present, 4.3% had a male householder with no wife present, and 53.2% were non-families. 40.4% of all households were made up of individuals, and 10.6% had someone living alone who was 65 years of age or older. The average household size was 2.19 and the average family size was 3.05.

The median age in the city was 31.6 years. 24.3% of residents were under the age of 18; 6.8% were between the ages of 18 and 24; 32% were from 25 to 44; 24.2% were from 45 to 64; and 12.6% were 65 years of age or older. The gender makeup of the city was 54.4% male and 45.6% female.

=== 2000 census ===
As of the census of 2000, there were 90 people, 42 households, and 19 families living in the city. The population density was 649.0 inhabitants per square mile (250.6/km^{2}). There were 43 housing units at an average density of 310.1 per square mile (119.7/km^{2}). The racial makeup of the city was 100.00% White.

There were 42 households, out of which 23.8% had children under the age of 18 living with them, 45.2% were married couples living together, and 52.4% were non-families. 47.6% of all households were made up of individuals, and 26.2% had someone living alone who was 65 years of age or older. The average household size was 2.14 and the average family size was 3.20.

In the city, the population was spread out, with 27.8% under the age of 18, 5.6% from 18 to 24, 31.1% from 25 to 44, 14.4% from 45 to 64, and 21.1% who were 65 years of age or older. The median age was 37 years. For every 100 females, there were 130.8 males. For every 100 females age 18 and over, there were 150.0 males.

The median income for a household in the city was $38,750, and the median income for a family was $45,625. Males had a median income of $30,833 versus $30,625 for females. The per capita income for the city was $15,694. There were no families and 5.3% of the population living below the poverty line, including no under eighteens and 18.8% of those over 64.
