= Fairfax, Minnesota =

City in Minnesota, United States

Fairfax
- City
- Motto: "A Good Place To Live"
- Location of Fairfax, Minnesota
- Coordinates: 44°31′42″N 94°43′23″W
- Country: United States
- State: Minnesota
- County: Renville

Area
  - Total: 1.31 sq mi (3.39 km^{2})
  - Land: 1.31 sq mi (3.39 km^{2})
  - Water: 0 sq mi (0.00 km^{2})
- Elevation: 1,093 ft (333 m)

Population (2020)
  - Total: 1,250
  - Density: 954.4/sq mi (368.51/km^{2})
- Time zone: UTC-6 (Central (CST))
  - Summer (DST): UTC-5 (CDT)
- ZIP code: 55332
- Area code: 507
- FIPS code: 27-20222
- GNIS feature ID: 2394729
- Website: City of Fairfax

Fairfax is a city in Renville County, Minnesota, United States. The population was 1,250 at the 2020 census.

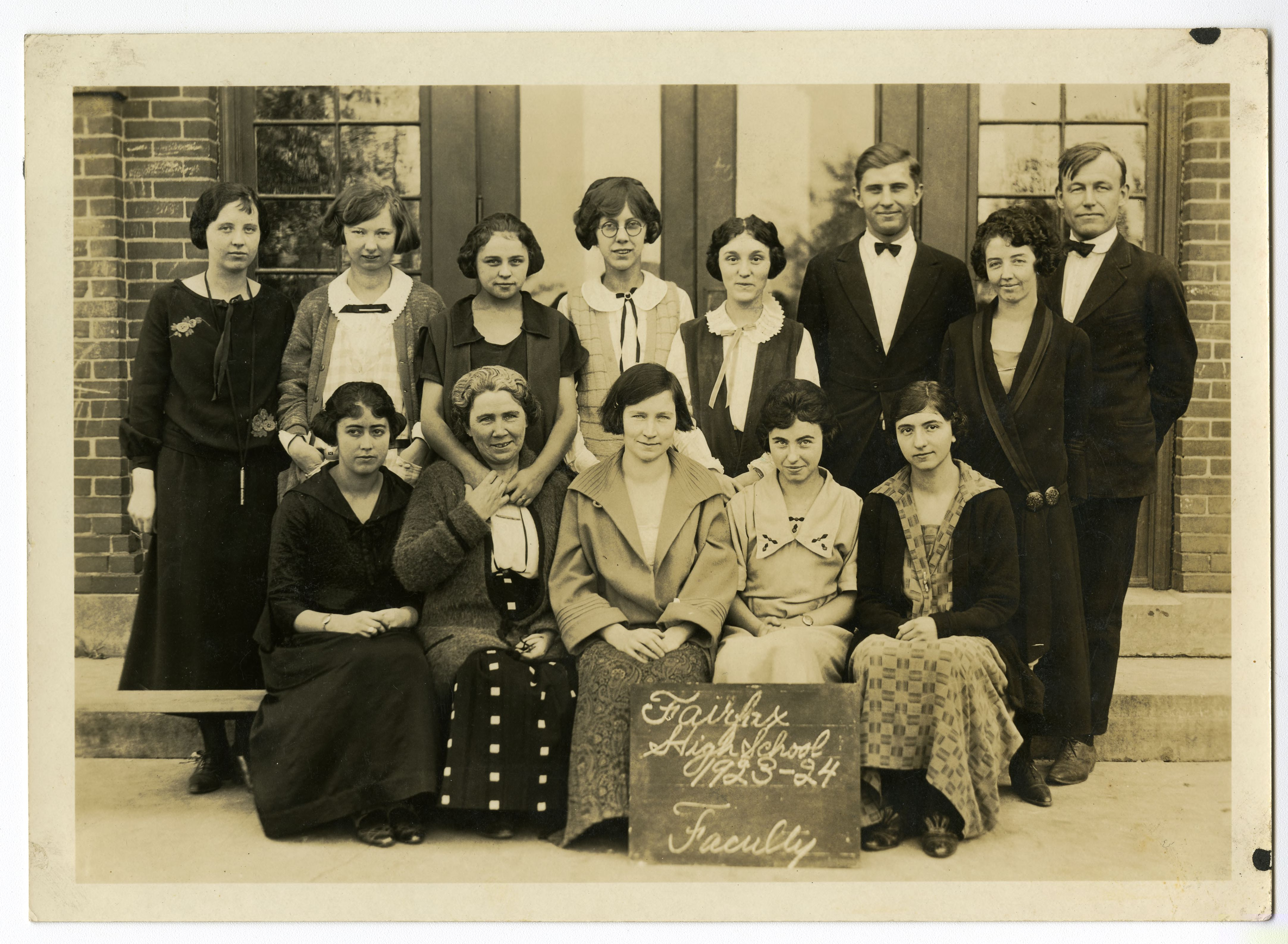
Fairfax High School faculty, 1923-1924

Minnesota State Highways 4 and 19 are two of the main arterial routes in the city.

Fort Ridgely State Park is nearby.

== History ==
Fairfax was platted in 1882, and named after Fairfax County, Virginia. A post office has been in operation at Fairfax since 1882. Fairfax was incorporated in 1888.

== Geography ==
According to the United States Census Bureau, the city has a total area of 1.30 square miles (3.37 km^{2}), all land.

== Demographics ==
Historical population
Census	Pop.	Note	%±
1890	351		—
1900	642		82.9%
1910	815		26.9%
1920	1,066		30.8%
1930	916		−14.1%
1940	1,116		21.8%
1950	1,143		2.4%
1960	1,489		30.3%
1970	1,432		−3.8%
1980	1,405		−1.9%
1990	1,276		−9.2%
2000	1,295		1.5%
2010	1,235		−4.6%
2020	1,250		1.2%
U.S. Decennial Census

=== 2010 census ===
As of the census of 2010, there were 1,235 people, 513 households, and 327 families living in the city. The population density was 950.0 inhabitants per square mile (366.8/km^{2}). There were 577 housing units at an average density of 443.8 per square mile (171.4/km^{2}). The racial makeup of the city was 92.6% White, 0.2% Native American, 0.2% Asian, 6.3% from other races, and 0.6% from two or more races. Hispanic or Latino of any race were 11.3% of the population.

There were 513 households, of which 29.4% had children under the age of 18 living with them, 49.7% were married couples living together, 9.6% had a female householder with no husband present, 4.5% had a male householder with no wife present, and 36.3% were non-families. 32.2% of all households were made up of individuals, and 16.5% had someone living alone who was 65 years of age or older. The average household size was 2.29 and the average family size was 2.87.

The median age in the city was 45.3 years. 23.2% of residents were under the age of 18; 6.3% were between the ages of 18 and 24; 20.1% were from 25 to 44; 27.6% were from 45 to 64; and 22.8% were 65 years of age or older. The gender makeup of the city was 49.0% male and 51.0% female.

=== 2000 census ===
As of the census of 2000, there were 1,295 people, 534 households, and 335 families living in the city. The population density was 1,006.6 inhabitants per square mile (388.7/km^{2}). There were 589 housing units at an average density of 457.8 per square mile (176.8/km^{2}). The racial makeup of the city was 92.90% White, 0.23% African American, 0.39% Native American, 0.08% Asian, 5.56% from other races, and 0.85% from two or more races. Hispanic or Latino of any race were 7.64% of the population.

There were 534 households, out of which 29.0% had children under the age of 18 living with them, 52.1% were married couples living together, 7.3% had a female householder with no husband present, and 37.1% were non-families. 33.3% of all households were made up of individuals, and 22.1% had someone living alone who was 65 years of age or older. The average household size was 2.32 and the average family size was 2.96.

In the city, the population was spread out, with 25.9% under the age of 18, 6.6% from 18 to 24, 22.8% from 25 to 44, 17.1% from 45 to 64, and 27.7% who were 65 years of age or older. The median age was 41 years. For every 100 females, there were 86.1 males. For every 100 females age 18 and over, there were 84.3 males.

The median income for a household in the city was $33,700, and the median income for a family was $42,054. Males had a median income of $28,125 versus $19,779 for females. The per capita income for the city was $18,297. About 6.4% of families and 9.2% of the population were below the poverty line, including 10.2% of those under age 18 and 10.5% of those age 65 or over.

== Local media ==
=== Newspapers ===
- The Eagle Extra - Weekly newspaper, first published on June 21, 2007 as 'The Eagle', then changed to 'The Eagle Extra' on March 6, 2008 due to a naming conflict with The Eagle newspaper in Texas. As of October 2010, The circulation of The Eagle Extra was under 200.
- Fairfax Standard/Gazette
