= Regal, Minnesota =

City in Minnesota, United States

Regal
- City
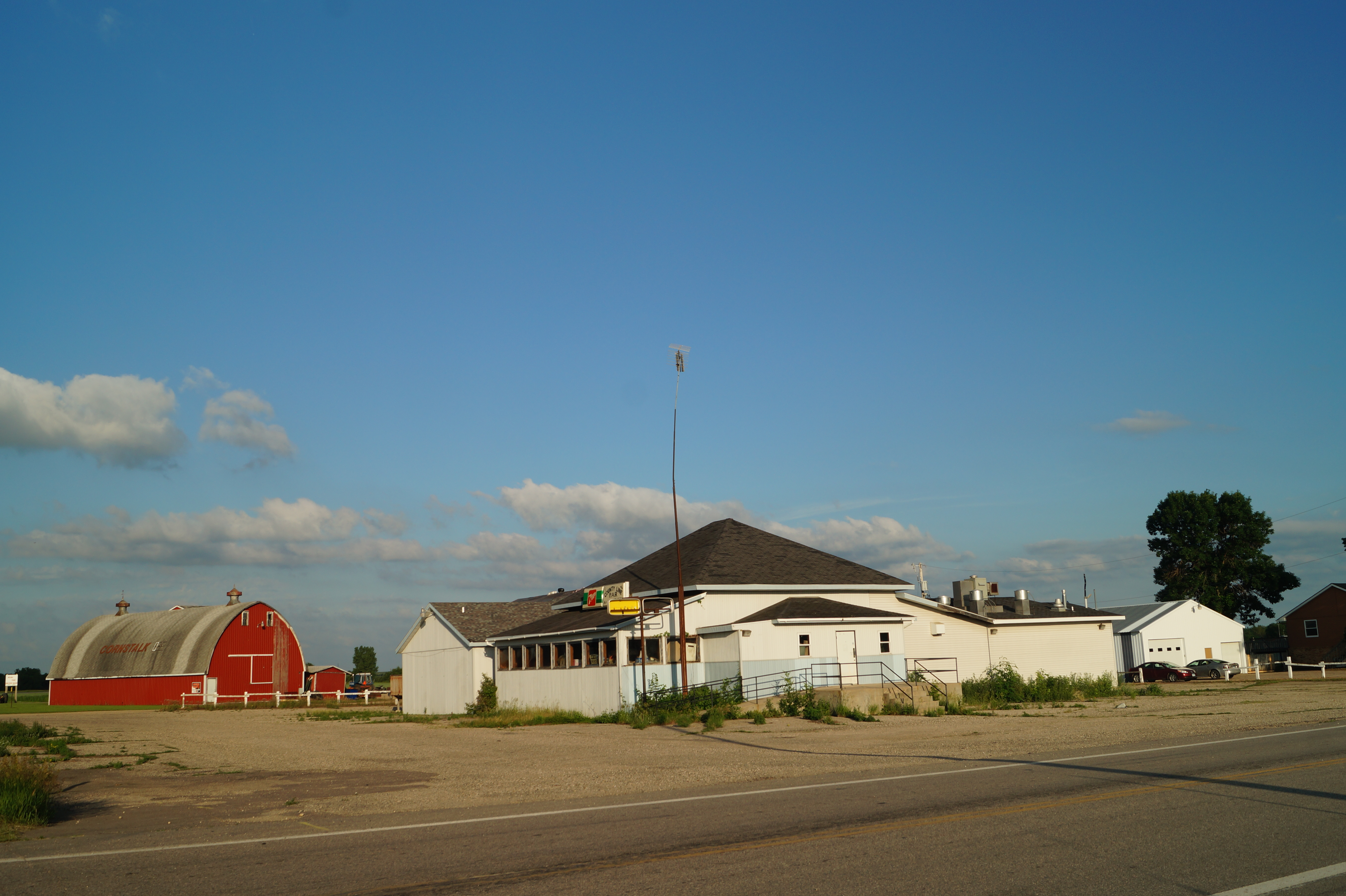

- Location of Regal, Minnesota
- Coordinates: 45°24′19″N 94°50′23″W
- Country: United States
- State: Minnesota
- County: Kandiyohi

Area
  - Total: 0.51 sq mi (1.33 km^{2})
  - Land: 0.51 sq mi (1.33 km^{2})
  - Water: 0 sq mi (0.00 km^{2})
- Elevation: 1,217 ft (371 m)

Population (2020)
  - Total: 43
  - Density: 83.7/sq mi (32.33/km^{2})
- Time zone: UTC-6 (Central (CST))
  - Summer (DST): UTC-5 (CDT)
- Area code: 320
- FIPS code: 27-53710
- GNIS feature ID: 2396344

Regal is a city in northeast Kandiyohi County, Minnesota, United States, along the North Fork of the Crow River. The population was 43 at the 2020 census.

== Geography ==
According to the United States Census Bureau, the city has an area of 0.50 square miles (1.29 km^{2}), all land.

Minnesota State Highway 55 serves as a main route in the community.

== Demographics ==
Historical population
| Census | Pop. | Note | %± |
|---|---|---|---|
| 1950 | 64 | | — |
| 1960 | 53 | | −17.2% |
| 1970 | 44 | | −17.0% |
| 1980 | 70 | | 59.1% |
| 1990 | 51 | | −27.1% |
| 2000 | 40 | | −21.6% |
| 2010 | 34 | | −15.0% |
| 2020 | 43 | | 26.5% |
U.S. Decennial Census

=== 2010 census ===
As of the census of 2010, there were 34 people, 19 households, and 9 families living in the city. The population density was 68.0 inhabitants per square mile (26.3/km^{2}). There were 20 housing units at an average density of 40.0 per square mile (15.4/km^{2}). The racial makeup of the city was 100.0% White.

There were 19 households, of which 10.5% had children under the age of 18 living with them, 36.8% were married couples living together, 5.3% had a female householder with no husband present, 5.3% had a male householder with no wife present, and 52.6% were non-families. 47.4% of all households were made up of individuals, and 21% had someone living alone who was 65 years of age or older. The average household size was 1.79 and the average family size was 2.56.

The median age in the city was 53.5 years. 11.8% of residents were under the age of 18; 5.8% were between the ages of 18 and 24; 20.5% were from 25 to 44; 35.3% were from 45 to 64; and 26.5% were 65 years of age or older. The gender makeup of the city was 55.9% male and 44.1% female.

=== 2000 census ===
As of the census of 2000, there were 40 people, 19 households, and 11 families living in the city. The population density was 79.4 inhabitants per square mile (30.7/km^{2}). There were 20 housing units at an average density of 39.7 per square mile (15.3/km^{2}). The racial makeup of the city was 97.50% White and 2.50% Asian.

There were 19 households, out of which 15.8% had children under the age of 18 living with them, 47.4% were married couples living together, and 42.1% were non-families. 26.3% of all households were made up of individuals, and 26.3% had someone living alone who was 65 years of age or older. The average household size was 2.11 and the average family size was 2.64.

In the city, the population was spread out, with 10.0% under the age of 18, 15.0% from 18 to 24, 25.0% from 25 to 44, 27.5% from 45 to 64, and 22.5% who were 65 years of age or older. The median age was 44 years. For every 100 females, there were 100.0 males. For every 100 females age 18 and over, there were 125.0 males.

The median income for a household in the city was $39,167, and the median income for a family was $60,417. Males had a median income of $50,417 versus $27,500 for females. The per capita income for the city was $26,710. None of the population and none of the families were below the poverty line.

== Notable person ==
- Michelle Fischbach, member of the US House of Representatives
