= Farwell, Minnesota =

City in Minnesota, United States

Farwell
- City
- Location of Farwell, Minnesota
- Coordinates: 45°45′08″N 95°37′08″W
- Country: United States
- State: Minnesota
- County: Pope
- Founded: 1887

Area
  - Total: 0.25 sq mi (0.65 km^{2})
  - Land: 0.25 sq mi (0.65 km^{2})
  - Water: 0 sq mi (0.00 km^{2})
- Elevation: 1,345 ft (410 m)

Population (2020)
  - Total: 56
  - Estimate (2021): 57
  - Density: 222.9/sq mi (86.05/km^{2})
- Time zone: UTC-6 (Central)
  - Summer (DST): UTC-5 (CDT)
- Zip code: 56327
- Area code: 320
- FIPS code: 27-20690
- GNIS feature ID: 2394752

Farwell is a city in Pope County, Minnesota, United States. The population was 56 at the 2020 census.

== History ==
Farwell was platted in 1887. A post office was established at Farwell in 1887, and remained in operation until 1998. Since 1998 the City has had a community post office arrangement with the United States Post Office wherein the City pays the wages of the Post Mistress but she is an employee of the USPS.

When the Minneapolis and Pacific Railway, forerunner of the Soo Line, was constructed through what became Farwell in 1886, the company took the lead in creating the new townsites that adjoined its stations by arranging for the surveying, platting and sale of lots. Among the key people involved were William D. Washburn, president, Peter M. Dahl, surveyor, and Charles D. Hammond who managed real estate matters. Messrs. Washburn, Hammond, and Frederick D. Underwood, general manager, were directly involved in naming these new townsites, along with assigning street/avenue names.

Farwell. Local histories muse that the name might have been attributed to a Swedish accented attendee at a local meeting, called for the purpose of naming the new town, who exclaimed 'farval' or 'farewell' as he left in disgust when a name could not be agreed upon. It's a humorous anecdote, but does not comport with how townsite names were selected. In actuality, Farwell was likely named for Charles B. Farwell, of Illinois, a political colleague of Washburn's. They served together in the U.S. House of Representatives in Washington, D.C., during 1881-1883, and later in the US Senate for a few years beginning in 1889. That explanation was given by F. D. Underwood in correspondence with a Soo Line official several years later. It is interesting to note that Chas. Hammond's wife's maiden name was Farwell. It is possible that when the plat was developed Mr. Hammond seized on that coincidence, giving a double-meaning to the naming of this village. Among Farwell's street names, Bertrand was the middle name of one of Charles Hammond's sons. Chermak, Alton - Soo Line Railroad historian.

== Geography ==
According to the United States Census Bureau, the city has a total area of 0.29 square miles (0.75 km^{2}), all land.

Minnesota State Highway 55 serves as a main route in the community.

== Demographics ==
Historical population
Census	Pop.	Note	%±
1910	141		—
1920	140		−0.7%
1930	147		5.0%
1940	132		−10.2%
1950	112		−15.2%
1960	106		−5.4%
1970	102		−3.8%
1980	77		−24.5%
1990	74		−3.9%
2000	57		−23.0%
2010	51		−10.5%
2020	56		9.8%
2021 (est.)	57		1.8%
U.S. Decennial Census; 2020 Census

=== 2010 census ===
As of the census of 2010, there were 51 people, 27 households, and 14 families living in the city. The population density was 175.9 inhabitants per square mile (67.9/km^{2}). There were 30 housing units at an average density of 103.4 per square mile (39.9/km^{2}). The racial makeup of the city was 100.0% White.

There were 27 households, of which 22.2% had children under the age of 18 living with them, 37.0% were married couples living together, 3.7% had a female householder with no husband present, 11.1% had a male householder with no wife present, and 48.1% were non-families. 37.0% of all households were made up of individuals, and 7.4% had someone living alone who was 65 years of age or older. The average household size was 1.89 and the average family size was 2.43.

The median age in the city was 49.5 years. 15.7% of residents were under the age of 18; 0.0% were between the ages of 18 and 24; 29.4% were from 25 to 44; 37.2% were from 45 to 64; and 17.6% were 65 years of age or older. The gender makeup of the city was 47.1% male and 52.9% female.

=== 2000 census ===
As of the census of 2000, there were 57 people, 27 households, and 16 families living in the city. The population density was 198.3 inhabitants per square mile (76.6/km^{2}). There were 30 housing units at an average density of 104.4 per square mile (40.3/km^{2}). The racial makeup of the city was 100.00% White.

There were 27 households, out of which 22.2% had children under the age of 18 living with them, 37.0% were married couples living together, and 40.7% were non-families. 40.7% of all households were made up of individuals, and 22.2% had someone living alone who was 65 years of age or older. The average household size was 2.11 and the average family size was 2.88.

In the city, the population was spread out, with 19.3% under the age of 18, 14.0% from 18 to 24, 19.3% from 25 to 44, 22.8% from 45 to 64, and 24.6% who were 65 years of age or older. The median age was 44 years. For every 100 females, there were 103.6 males. For every 100 females age 18 and over, there were 119.0 males.

The median income for a household in the city was $28,125, and the median income for a family was $31,875. Males had a median income of $28,333 versus $13,750 for females. The per capita income for the city was $19,917. None of the population or the families were below the poverty line.
