= Ormsby, Minnesota =

City in Minnesota, United States

- City
- Location in Watonwan County and the state of Minnesota
- Coordinates: 43°51′01″N 94°41′55″W
- Country: United States
- State: Minnesota
- Counties: Watonwan, Martin

Government
  - Type: Mayor – Council
  - Mayor: Bruce Ringham

Area
  - Total: 0.36 sq mi (0.92 km^{2})
  - Land: 0.36 sq mi (0.92 km^{2})
  - Water: 0 sq mi (0.00 km^{2})
- Elevation: 1,204 ft (367 m)

Population (2020)
  - Total: 118
  - Density: 333.8/sq mi (128.89/km^{2})
- Time zone: UTC-6 (Central (CST))
  - Summer (DST): UTC-5 (CDT)
- ZIP code: 56162
- Area code: 507
- FIPS code: 27-48562
- GNIS feature ID: 2396080

Ormsby is a city in Watonwan and Martin counties in the U.S. state of Minnesota. The population was 118 at the 2020 census.

The community is located between St. James and Sherburn on Minnesota State Highway 4.

== History ==
Ormsby was platted in 1899, and named after one "Colonel Ormsby, of Emmetsburg, Iowa". A post office has been in operation at Ormsby since 1900. Ormsby was incorporated in 1902.

== Geography ==
The city sits on the boundary between Watonwan County to the north and Martin County to the south. State Highway 4 passes through the east side of the city, leading north 10 miles (16 km) to St. James, the Watonwan county seat, and south 14 miles (23 km) to Sherburn. Fairmont, the Martin County seat, is 25 miles (40 km) to the southeast.

According to the U.S. Census Bureau, Ormsby has a total area of 0.35 square miles (0.91 km^{2}), all land.

== Government ==
Ormsby is located within Minnesota's 1st congressional district, represented by Republican Brad Finstad.

== Demographics ==
Historical population
Census	Pop.	Note	%±
1910	112		—
1920	115		2.7%
1930	107		−7.0%
1940	183		71.0%
1950	190		3.8%
1960	221		16.3%
1970	199		−10.0%
1980	181		−9.0%
1990	159		−12.2%
2000	154		−3.1%
2010	131		−14.9%
2020	118		−9.9%
U.S. Decennial Census

=== 2010 census ===
As of the census of 2010, there were 131 people, 65 households, and 41 families living in the city. The population density was 374.3 inhabitants per square mile (144.5/km^{2}). There were 68 housing units at an average density of 194.3 per square mile (75.0/km^{2}). The racial makeup of the city was 91.6% White, 7.6% Native American, and 0.8% from two or more races. Hispanic or Latino of any race were 1.5% of the population.

There were 65 households, of which 13.8% had children under the age of 18 living with them, 53.8% were married couples living together, 3.1% had a female householder with no husband present, 6.2% had a male householder with no wife present, and 36.9% were non-families. 33.8% of all households were made up of individuals, and 20% had someone living alone who was 65 years of age or older. The average household size was 2.02 and the average family size was 2.51.

The median age in the city was 52.3 years. 14.5% of residents were under the age of 18; 7.7% were between the ages of 18 and 24; 15.2% were from 25 to 44; 36.7% were from 45 to 64; and 26% were 65 years of age or older. The gender makeup of the city was 48.1% male and 51.9% female.

=== 2000 census ===
As of the census of 2000, there were 154 people, 65 households, and 46 families living in the city. The population density was 429.8 inhabitants per square mile (165.9/km^{2}). There were 68 housing units at an average density of 189.8 per square mile (73.3/km^{2}). The racial makeup of the city was 98.70% White, 0.65% Asian, 0.65% from other races. Hispanic or Latino of any race were 0.65% of the population.

There were 65 households, out of which 36.9% had children under the age of 18 living with them, 63.1% were married couples living together, 6.2% had a female householder with no husband present, and 27.7% were non-families. 26.2% of all households were made up of individuals, and 18.5% had someone living alone who was 65 years of age or older. The average household size was 2.37 and the average family size was 2.85.

In the city, the population was spread out, with 24.0% under the age of 18, 7.1% from 18 to 24, 26.6% from 25 to 44, 23.4% from 45 to 64, and 18.8% who were 65 years of age or older. The median age was 41 years. For every 100 females, there were 83.3 males. For every 100 females age 18 and over, there were 91.8 males.

The median income for a household in the city was $37,500, and the median income for a family was $47,188. Males had a median income of $33,750 versus $14,063 for females. The per capita income for the city was $16,954. About 2.7% of families and 6.0% of the population were below the poverty line, including 12.5% of those under the age of eighteen and none of those 65 or over.
