= Hector, Minnesota =

City in Minnesota, United States

Hector
- City
- Motto(s): "A great place to live, work and play!"
- Location of Hector, Minnesota
- Coordinates: 44°44′33″N 94°42′52″W
- Country: United States
- State: Minnesota
- County: Renville
- Founded: 1878
- Organized: 1881

Government
  - Mayor: Daniel Edwards

Area
  - Total: 1.81 sq mi (4.68 km^{2})
  - Land: 1.81 sq mi (4.68 km^{2})
  - Water: 0 sq mi (0.00 km^{2})
- Elevation: 1,080 ft (330 m)

Population (2020)
  - Total: 1,012
  - Estimate (2022): 1,002
  - Density: 560.2/sq mi (216.31/km^{2})
- Time zone: UTC-6 (Central (CST))
  - Summer (DST): UTC-5 (CDT)
- ZIP code: 55342
- Area code: 320
- FIPS code: 27-28124
- GNIS feature ID: 2394344
- Website: hector.govoffice.com

Hector is a city in Renville County, Minnesota, United States. The population was 1,012 at the 2020 census.

== Geography ==
According to the United States Census Bureau, the city has a total area of 1.56 square miles (4.04 km^{2}), all land.

== History ==
Hector was founded in 1878 when the Hastings and Dakota Railway Company constructed the railroad on the north side of the original town site. The ten-block town site survey was completed on September 14, 1878, on land owned by the Hastings and Dakota.

The village was named after the township of Hector, which had been organized in June 1874. It was originally named Milford, but the name was changed when it was learned there was already another Milford in Minnesota. There was heated debate between those who favored the name Plainfield (after the stage stop and post office) and those who favored the name Hector, a township in New York on the east shore of Seneca Lake where many of the early settlers came from. Hector, New York, was named after the bravest of the ancient Trojan warriors whose story is told in Homer's "Iliad". (Later research showed the other Milford was actually in South Dakota, so the town could have been named Milford after all.)

== Demographics ==
Historical population
Census	Pop.	Note	%±
1880	196		—
1890	354		80.6%
1900	654		84.7%
1910	866		32.4%
1920	830		−4.2%
1930	864		4.1%
1940	1,044		20.8%
1950	1,196		14.6%
1960	1,297		8.4%
1970	1,178		−9.2%
1980	1,252		6.3%
1990	1,145		−8.5%
2000	1,166		1.8%
2010	1,151		−1.3%
2020	1,012		−12.1%
2022 (est.)	1,002		−1.0%
U.S. Decennial Census; 2020 Census

=== 2010 census ===
As of the census of 2010, there were 1,151 people, 513 households, and 322 families living in the city. The population density was 737.8 inhabitants per square mile (284.9/km^{2}). There were 573 housing units at an average density of 367.3 per square mile (141.8/km^{2}). The racial makeup of the city was 96.9% White, 0.6% Asian, 2.3% from other races, and 0.3% from two or more races. Hispanic or Latino of any race were 5.7% of the population.

There were 513 households, of which 29.2% had children under the age of 18 living with them, 48.3% were married couples living together, 10.1% had a female householder with no husband present, 4.3% had a male householder with no wife present, and 37.2% were non-families. 31.8% of all households were made up of individuals, and 18.8% had someone living alone who was 65 years of age or older. The average household size was 2.24 and the average family size was 2.78.

The median age in the city was 43.4 years. 23.8% of residents were under the age of 18; 6.5% were between the ages of 18 and 24; 21.5% were from 25 to 44; 27.9% were from 45 to 64; and 20.2% were 65 years of age or older. The gender makeup of the city was 48.9% male and 51.1% female.

=== 2000 census ===
As of the census of 2000, there were 1,166 people, 509 households, and 320 families living in the city. The population density was 755.7 inhabitants per square mile (291.8/km^{2}). There were 532 housing units at an average density of 344.8 per square mile (133.1/km^{2}). The racial makeup of the city was 95.54% White, 4.03% from other races, and 0.43% from two or more races. Hispanic or Latino of any race were 5.23% of the population.

There were 509 households, out of which 28.9% had children under the age of 18 living with them, 50.3% were married couples living together, 9.4% had a female householder with no husband present, and 37.1% were non-families. 33.6% of all households were made up of individuals, and 20.4% had someone living alone who was 65 years of age or older. The average household size was 2.29 and the average family size was 2.90.

In the city, the population was spread out, with 25.5% under the age of 18, 6.4% from 18 to 24, 26.2% from 25 to 44, 21.6% from 45 to 64, and 20.2% who were 65 years of age or older. The median age was 40 years. For every 100 females, there were 85.4 males. For every 100 females age 18 and over, there were 84.9 males.

The median income for a household in the city was $33,000, and the median income for a family was $41,477. Males had a median income of $30,625 versus $22,159 for females. The per capita income for the city was $18,406. About 6.5% of families and 8.4% of the population were below the poverty line, including 11.4% of those under age 18 and 8.4% of those age 65 or over.

== Notable people ==
- Dorothy Peterson, film actress, born in Hector

== Infrastructure ==
=== Transportation ===
U.S. Route 212 and Minnesota State Highway 4 are two of the main arterial routes in the city.

Hector Municipal Airport

The town is also served by rail via the Twin Cities and Western railroad's connection to both Minneapolis and St. Paul and points west.
