= La Salle, Minnesota =

City in Minnesota, United States

La Salle
- City
- Location of La Salle, Minnesota
- Coordinates: 44°04′16″N 94°34′17″W
- Country: United States
- State: Minnesota
- County: Watonwan

Government
  - Type: Mayor - Council
  - Mayor: Julie Carr

Area
  - Total: 0.085 sq mi (0.22 km^{2})
  - Land: 0.085 sq mi (0.22 km^{2})
  - Water: 0 sq mi (0.00 km^{2})
- Elevation: 1,037 ft (316 m)

Population (2020)
  - Total: 79
  - Estimate (2021): 77
  - Density: 913.2/sq mi (352.58/km^{2})
- Time zone: UTC-6 (CST)
  - Summer (DST): UTC-5 (CDT)
- ZIP code: 56056
- Area code: 507
- FIPS code: 27-35702
- GNIS feature ID: 2395574

La Salle (/ləˈsæl/ lə-SAL) is a city in Watonwan County, Minnesota, United States. The population was 79 at the 2020 census.

== History ==
La Salle was platted in 1899, and named for René-Robert Cavelier, Sieur de La Salle (1643–1687), a French explorer of North America. A post office has been in operation at La Salle since 1900.

== Geography ==
According to the United States Census Bureau, the city has a total area of 0.09 square miles (0.23 km^{2}), all land.

== Demographics ==
Historical population
Census	Pop.	Note	%±
1930	121		—
1940	139		14.9%
1950	144		3.6%
1960	147		2.1%
1970	132		−10.2%
1980	115		−12.9%
1990	98		−14.8%
2000	90		−8.2%
2010	87		−3.3%
2020	79		−9.2%
2021 (est.)	77		−2.5%
U.S. Decennial Census; 2020 Census

=== 2010 census ===
As of the census of 2010, there were 87 people, 42 households, and 18 families residing in the city. The population density was 966.7 inhabitants per square mile (373.2/km^{2}). There were 45 housing units at an average density of 500.0 per square mile (193.1/km^{2}). The racial makeup of the city was 93.1% White, 1.1% African American, 1.1% Native American, 1.1% from other races, and 3.4% from two or more races. Hispanic or Latino of any race were 4.6% of the population.

There were 42 households, of which 16.7% had children under the age of 18 living with them, 33.3% were married couples living together, 7.1% had a female householder with no husband present, 2.4% had a male householder with no wife present, and 57.1% were non-families. 45.2% of all households were made up of individuals, and 16.6% had someone living alone who was 65 years of age or older. The average household size was 2.07 and the average family size was 3.22.

The median age in the city was 41.5 years. 19.5% of residents were under the age of 18; 8% were between the ages of 18 and 24; 26.4% were from 25 to 44; 26.3% were from 45 to 64; and 19.5% were 65 years of age or older. The gender makeup of the city was 58.6% male and 41.4% female.

=== 2000 census ===
As of the census of 2000, there were 90 people, 44 households, and 20 families residing in the city. The population density was 1,001.6 inhabitants per square mile (386.7/km^{2}). There were 44 housing units at an average density of 489.7 per square mile (189.1/km^{2}). The racial makeup of the city was 100.00% White.

There were 44 households, out of which 20.5% had children under the age of 18 living with them, 36.4% were married couples living together, 6.8% had a female householder with no husband present, and 52.3% were non-families. 45.5% of all households were made up of individuals, and 20.5% had someone living alone who was 65 years of age or older. The average household size was 2.05 and the average family size was 2.76.

In the city, the population was spread out, with 22.2% under the age of 18, 6.7% from 18 to 24, 25.6% from 25 to 44, 21.1% from 45 to 64, and 24.4% who were 65 years of age or older. The median age was 42 years. For every 100 females, there were 150.0 males. For every 100 females age 18 and over, there were 133.3 males.

The median income for a household in the city was $29,375, and the median income for a family was $38,750. Males had a median income of $35,000 versus $20,313 for females. The per capita income for the city was $15,941. There were 27.8% of families and 36.3% of the population living below the poverty line, including 70.8% of under eighteens and 9.5% of those over 64.
