= Paynesville, Minnesota =

City in Minnesota, United States

Paynesville
- City
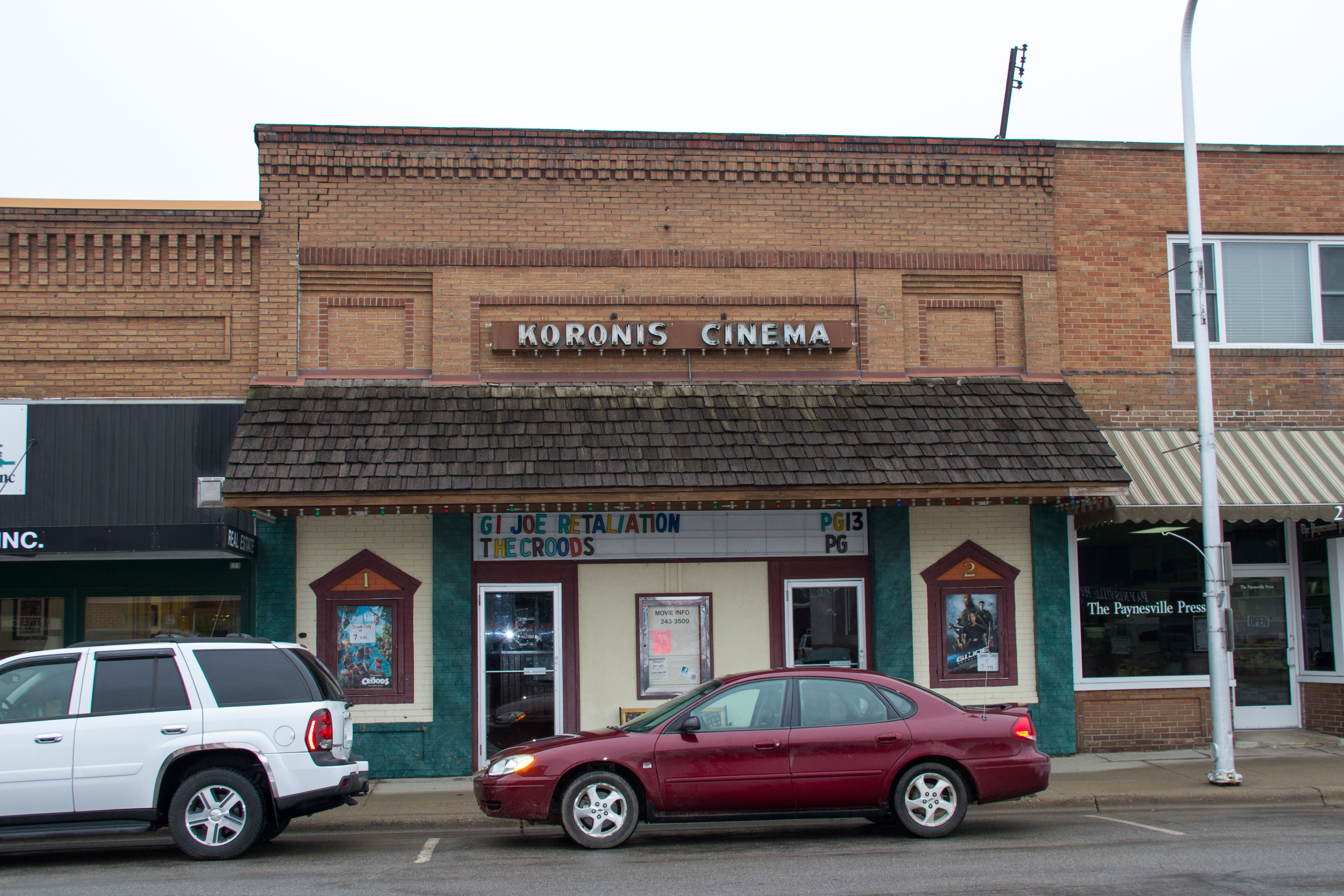
- Koronis Cinema, Downtown Paynesville
- Motto: "An Area For All Seasons"
- Location of Paynesville within Stearns County, Minnesota
- Coordinates: 45°22′43″N 94°43′18″W
- Country: United States
- State: Minnesota
- County: Stearns

Government
  - Type: Mayor–council government
  - Mayor: Shawn C. Reinke
  - Governing body: Paynesville City Council

Area
  - Total: 2.29 sq mi (5.93 km^{2})
  - Land: 2.29 sq mi (5.93 km^{2})
  - Water: 0 sq mi (0.00 km^{2})
- Elevation: 1,175 ft (358 m)

Population (2020)
  - Total: 2,388
  - Estimate (2021): 2,449
  - Density: 1,042.9/sq mi (402.66/km^{2})
- Time zone: UTC-6 (CST)
  - Summer (DST): UTC-5 (CDT)
- ZIP code: 56362
- Area code: 320
- FIPS code: 27-49966
- GNIS feature ID: 2396168
- Website: www.cityofpaynesville.gov

Paynesville is a city in Stearns County, Minnesota, United States, on Lake Koronis, in the central part of the state. The population was 2,388 at the 2020 census. It is part of the St. Cloud Metropolitan Statistical Area.

== History ==
Paynesville was platted in 1857 by Edwin E. Payne, and named for him. The town was completely evacuated to the relative safety of Richmond and St. Cloud during the 1862 Dakota War; the Dakota burned the townsite to the ground. The town was subsequently rebuilt, this time with the addition of a wooden stockade built by the U.S. Army.

The arrival of the Soo Line and Great Northern Railway in 1886 spurred increased settlement near the railroad lines, leading to the formation of the new settlements of Jim Town along the Soo Line and North Paynesville near the Great Northern. Jim Town, on the site of today's downtown Paynesville, became the largest of the three Paynesvilles, eventually merging with the others as New Paynesville, later shortened back to Paynesville.

A post office has been in operation at Paynesville since 1857.

In the late 1980s, a series of sexual assaults on pre-teen and teenage boys occurred in Paynesville. In 1989, 11-year-old Jacob Wetterling disappeared in nearby St. Joseph. That case inspired a federal law to create the first sex offender registries, and it was still not discovered until 2014 that the cases in both cities were perpetrated by the same person. Wetterling's body had been dumped in Paynesville.

== Geography ==
Paynesville lies along the North Fork of the Crow River and Lake Koronis. According to the United States Census Bureau, it has an area of 2.32 square miles (6.01 km^{2}), all land.

== Demographics ==
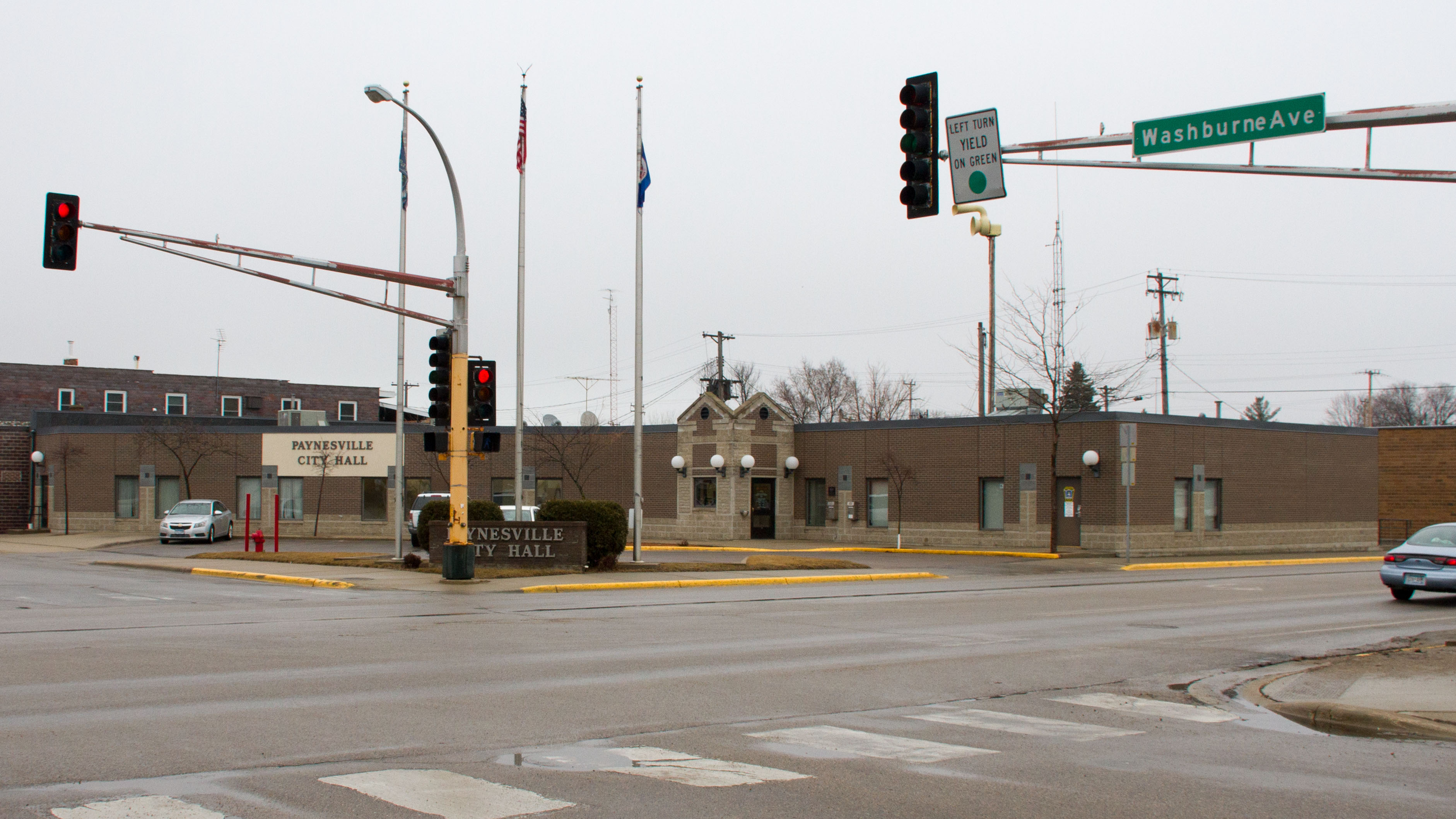
Paynesville City Hall

Historical population
Census	Pop.	Note	%±
1880	127		—
1890	352		177.2%
1900	373		6.0%
1910	901		141.6%
1920	1,060		17.6%
1930	1,121		5.8%
1940	1,317		17.5%
1950	1,503		14.1%
1960	1,754		16.7%
1970	1,920		9.5%
1980	2,140		11.5%
1990	2,275		6.3%
2000	2,267		−0.4%
2010	2,432		7.3%
2020	2,388		−1.8%
2021 (est.)	2,449		2.6%
U.S. Decennial Census; 2020 Census

=== 2020 census ===
As of the 2020 census, Paynesville had a population of 2,388. The median age was 40.4 years. 22.4% of residents were under the age of 18 and 25.4% of residents were 65 years of age or older. For every 100 females there were 94.5 males, and for every 100 females age 18 and over there were 91.9 males age 18 and over.

0.0% of residents lived in urban areas, while 100.0% lived in rural areas.

There were 1,060 households in Paynesville, of which 25.9% had children under the age of 18 living in them. Of all households, 42.5% were married-couple households, 19.4% were households with a male householder and no spouse or partner present, and 28.8% were households with a female householder and no spouse or partner present. About 35.7% of all households were made up of individuals and 18.9% had someone living alone who was 65 years of age or older.

There were 1,133 housing units, of which 6.4% were vacant. The homeowner vacancy rate was 1.7% and the rental vacancy rate was 5.6%.

Racial composition as of the 2020 census
Race	Number	Percent
White	2,197	92.0%
Black or African American	18	0.8%
American Indian and Alaska Native	10	0.4%
Asian	7	0.3%
Native Hawaiian and Other Pacific Islander	0	0.0%
Some other race	25	1.0%
Two or more races	131	5.5%
Hispanic or Latino (of any race)	85	3.6%

=== 2010 census ===
As of the census of 2010, there were 2,432 people, 1,065 households, and 635 families living in the city. The population density was 1,048.3 inhabitants per square mile (404.8/km^{2}). There were 1,148 housing units at an average density of 494.8 units per square mile (191.0 units/km^{2}). The racial makeup of the city was 97.0% White, 0.5% African American, 0.1% Native American, 0.4% Asian, 0.9% from other races, and 1.1% from two or more races. Hispanic or Latino of any race were 2.2% of the population.

There were 1,065 households, of which 26.9% had children under the age of 18 living with them, 46.9% were married couples living together, 7.1% had a female householder with no husband present, 5.6% had a male householder with no wife present, and 40.4% were non-families. 35.8% of all households were made up of individuals, and 20.4% had someone living alone who was 65 years of age or older. The average household size was 2.20 and the average family size was 2.83.

The median age in the city was 42.4 years. 22.1% of residents were under the age of 18; 6.9% were between the ages of 18 and 24; 23.6% were from 25 to 44; 21.9% were from 45 to 64; and 25.3% were 65 years of age or older. The gender makeup of the city was 47.7% male and 52.3% female.

=== 2000 census ===
As of the census of 2000, there were 2,267 people, 934 households, and 594 families living in the city. The population density was 1,715.2 inhabitants per square mile (662.2/km^{2}). There were 984 housing units at an average density of 744.5 units per square mile (287.5 units/km^{2}). The racial makeup of the city was 98.81% White, 0.04% African American, 0.09% Native American, 0.31% Asian, 0.22% from other races, and 0.53% from two or more races. Hispanic or Latino of any race were 1.28% of the population.

There were 934 households, out of which 28.2% had children under the age of 18 living with them, 54.1% were married couples living together, 6.7% had a female householder with no husband present, and 36.4% were non-families. 32.9% of all households were made up of individuals, and 20.0% had someone living alone who was 65 years of age or older. The average household size was 2.32 and the average family size was 2.95.

In the city, the population was spread out, with 23.0% under the age of 18, 8.8% from 18 to 24, 24.2% from 25 to 44, 18.9% from 45 to 64, and 25.1% who were 65 years of age or older. The median age was 40. For every 100 females, there were 88.3 males. For every 100 females age 18 and over, there were 82.0 males.

The median income for a household in the city was $34,000, and the median income for a family was $42,500. Males had a median income of $30,978 versus $20,219 for females. The per capita income for the city was $17,246. About 4.5% of families and 8.1% of the population were below the poverty line, including 4.6% of those under age 18 and 15.2% of those age 65 or over.

== Infrastructure ==
=== Transportation ===
Minnesota State Highways 4, 23, and 55 are three of Paynesville's main highways. Freight rail service is provided by the Soo Line's Paynesville Subdivision. Passenger rail service was formerly provided by the Great Northern Railway and by the Soo Line's Winnipeger until 1970; since then the nearest active train station to Paynesville has been in St. Cloud.

The City of Paynesville operates Paynesville Municipal Airport (PEX/KPEX), a small general aviation airport.

== Area lakes ==
=== Lake Koronis ===
One mile south of Paynesville, the 3014-acre Lake Koronis offers some of the best fishing in the area, with an abundance of walleye, bass, and northern pike. It reaches a maximum depth of 132 feet and averages 29 feet deep. Aquatic invasive species found in the lake include starry stonewort and zebra mussels.

=== Rice Lake ===
About five miles east-southeast of Paynesville, the 1639-acre Rice Lake also offers excellent walleye, bass, and northern pike fishing. There is public lake access on the northwest shore, at the end of 180th Street, and on the southwest shore, at the end of 253rd Avenue.
