= Meire Grove, Minnesota =

City in Minnesota, United States

Meire Grove
- City
- Location of Meire Grove within Stearns County, Minnesota
- Coordinates: 45°37′35″N 94°52′10″W
- Country: United States
- State: Minnesota
- County: Stearns

Area
  - Total: 0.39 sq mi (1.01 km^{2})
  - Land: 0.39 sq mi (1.01 km^{2})
  - Water: 0 sq mi (0.00 km^{2})
- Elevation: 1,280 ft (390 m)

Population (2020)
  - Total: 180
  - Density: 463/sq mi (178.8/km^{2})
- Time zone: UTC-6 (Central (CST))
  - Summer (DST): UTC-5 (CDT)
- FIPS code: 27-41534
- GNIS feature ID: 2395085

Meire Grove (/ˈmaɪər/ MIRE) is a city in Stearns County, Minnesota, United States. As of the 2020 census, Meire Grove had a population of 180. It is part of the St. Cloud Metropolitan Statistical Area.

Minnesota State Highway 4 serves as a main route in the community, and Interstate 94/U.S. Highway 52 is nearby.

== Geography ==
According to the United States Census Bureau, the city has a total area of 0.56 square miles (1.45 km^{2}), all land.

The city of Meire Grove is located within Grove Township geographically but is a separate entity.

== Demographics ==
Historical population
Census	Pop.	Note	%±
1900	165		—
1910	163		−1.2%
1920	185		13.5%
1930	176		−4.9%
1940	162		−8.0%
1950	128		−21.0%
1960	167		30.5%
1970	171		2.4%
1980	174		1.8%
1990	124		−28.7%
2000	149		20.2%
2010	179		20.1%
2020	180		0.6%
U.S. Decennial Census

=== 2010 census ===
As of the census of 2010, there were 179 people, 70 households, and 46 families living in the city. The population density was 319.6 inhabitants per square mile (123.4/km^{2}). There were 78 housing units at an average density of 139.3 per square mile (53.8/km^{2}). The racial makeup of the city was 98.9% White and 1.1% Asian.

There were 70 households, of which 27.1% had children under the age of 18 living with them, 47.1% were married couples living together, 5.7% had a female householder with no husband present, 12.9% had a male householder with no wife present, and 34.3% were non-families. 31.4% of all households were made up of individuals, and 18.6% had someone living alone who was 65 years of age or older. The average household size was 2.56 and the average family size was 3.00.

The median age in the city was 38.3 years. 27.4% of residents were under the age of 18; 6.6% were between the ages of 18 and 24; 25.1% were from 25 to 44; 13.3% were from 45 to 64; and 27.4% were 65 years of age or older. The gender makeup of the city was 48.6% male and 51.4% female.

=== 2000 census ===
As of the census of 2000, there were 149 people, 61 households, and 40 families living in the city. The population density was 324.8 inhabitants per square mile (125.4/km^{2}). There were 70 housing units at an average density of 152.6 per square mile (58.9/km^{2}). The racial makeup of the city was 100.00% White.

There were 61 households, out of which 26.2% had children under the age of 18 living with them, 54.1% were married couples living together, 4.9% had a female householder with no husband present, and 34.4% were non-families. 31.1% of all households were made up of individuals, and 23.0% had someone living alone who was 65 years of age or older. The average household size was 2.44 and the average family size was 3.05.

In the city, the population was spread out, with 26.8% under the age of 18, 5.4% from 18 to 24, 26.2% from 25 to 44, 13.4% from 45 to 64, and 28.2% who were 65 years of age or older. The median age was 36 years. For every 100 females, there were 88.6 males. For every 100 females age 18 and over, there were 87.9 males.

The median income for a household in the city was $24,250, and the median income for a family was $40,313. Males had a median income of $25,625 versus $22,813 for females. The per capita income for the city was $13,559. There were 7.7% of families and 17.3% of the population living below the poverty line, including 30.0% of under eighteens and 8.6% of those over 64.
