= Minnesota State Highway 4 =

State highway in Minnesota, United States

Trunk Highway 4
- MN 4 highlighted in red

Route information
- Maintained by MnDOT
- Length: 167.136 mi (268.979 km)
- Existed: 1920–present

Major junctions
- South end: Iowa 4 at the Iowa state line near Dunnell
- I-90 at Sherburn; MN 30 / MN 60 at St. James; US 14 / MN 68 at Sleepy Eye; MN 19 at Fairfax; US 212 at Hector; MN 7 at Cosmos; US 12 at Grove City; MN 23 / MN 55 at Paynesville
- North end: I-94 / US 52 near Sauk Centre and Melrose

Location
- Country: United States
- State: Minnesota
- Counties: Martin, Watonwan, Brown, Nicollet, Renville, Meeker, Kandiyohi, Stearns

Highway system
- Minnesota Trunk Highway System; Interstate; US; State; Legislative; Scenic
← MN 3	→ MN 5

Minnesota State Highway 4 (MN 4) is a 167.136-mile-long (268.979 km) highway in southwest and west-central Minnesota, which runs from Iowa Highway 4 at the Iowa state line (near Dunnell, MN and Estherville, IA), and continues north to its northern terminus at its interchange with Interstate Highway 94 near Sauk Centre and Melrose.

== Route description ==
State Highway 4 serves as a north–south route between Sherburn, Saint James, Sleepy Eye, Fairfax, Hector, Paynesville, and Meire Grove in southwest and west-central Minnesota.

Highway 4 parallels U.S. Highway 71 and State Highway 15 throughout its route.

Fort Ridgely State Park is located on Highway 4 in Nicollet County on the Minnesota River. The park is located south of Fairfax and northwest of New Ulm.

== History ==
The segment of Highway 4 between Paynesville and Interstate 94 is part of Minnesota Constitutional Route 4, established in 1920; the remainder of Highway 4 was authorized in 1933. Between Saint James and the Iowa border, Highway 4 followed very closely the former Minneapolis & St Louis Railway the remains of which are clearly visible on the west side of the highway between Minnesota Highway 60 and Sherburn, Minnesota. Grain elevators in Echols, Ormsby, Trimont, and Sherburn are aligned with the former M&StL route through each of these towns.

The route was completely paved by 1961.

== Major intersections ==
County	Location	mi	km	Destinations	Notes
Martin	Lake Fremont Township	0.000	0.000	Iowa 4 south – Estherville	Continuation into Iowa
Martin	Jay Township	10.147	16.330	CSAH 26 west	Southern end of CSAH 26 concurrency; formerly US 16
Martin	Sherburn	12.512	20.136	CSAH 26 east	Northern end of CSAH 26 concurrency; formerly US 16
Martin	Sherburn	13.367– 13.535	21.512– 21.782	I-90 – Fairmont, Jackson	I-90 Exit 87
Watonwan	St. James Township	34.378	55.326	MN 60 west / CSAH 57 / Bus. MN 60 east – Windom	Interchange; southern end of MN 60 concurrency
Watonwan	St. James Township	35.510	57.148	MN 60 east / MN 30 / Bus. MN 60 ends – Mankato	Northern end of MN 60 concurrency Southern end of MN 30 / MN 60 Bus. concurrency
Watonwan	St. James	36.807	59.235	Bus. MN 60 west / CSAH 56	Northern end of MN 60 Bus. concurrency
Watonwan	Nelson Township	42.092	67.741	MN 30 west / CSAH 3 – Darfur, La Salle	Northern end of MN 30 concurrency
Brown	Sleepy Eye	62.998	101.385	US 14 / MN 68	Southern end of MN 68 concurrency
Brown	Home Township	66.020	106.249	MN 68 west – Morgan	Northern end of MN 68 concurrency
Nicollet	Ridgely Township	73.519	118.317	CSAH 21 (Minnesota River Valley Scenic Byway) – Harkin's General Store, Fort Ridgely State Park	
Renville	Cairo Township	79.399	127.780	MN 19 – Winthrop, Redwood Falls	
Renville	Hector	94.212	151.620	US 212 – Glencoe, Olivia	
Meeker	Cosmos	108.147	174.046	MN 7 – Hutchinson, Montevideo	
Meeker	Grove City	123.011	197.967	US 12 west – Willmar	Western end of US 12 concurrency
Meeker	Swede Grove Township	123.620	198.947	US 12 east – Litchfield	Eastern end of US 12 concurrency
Meeker	Union Grove Township	135.633	218.280	MN 55 east – Eden Valley	Eastern end of MN 55 concurrency
Stearns	Paynesville			CSAH 66 (Lake Avenue)	Former MN 124
Stearns	Paynesville			MN 23 – St. Cloud, Willmar	Interchange
Kandiyohi	Roseville Township	143.193	230.447	MN 55 west – Belgrade	Western end of MN 55 concurrency
Stearns	Melrose Township	165.719– 165.804	266.699– 266.836	I-94 / US 52 – St. Cloud, Alexandria; CSAH 65	I-94 Exit 131
1.000 mi = 1.609 km; 1.000 km = 0.621 mi: Concurrency terminus
