= Sherburn, Minnesota =

City in Minnesota, United States

- City
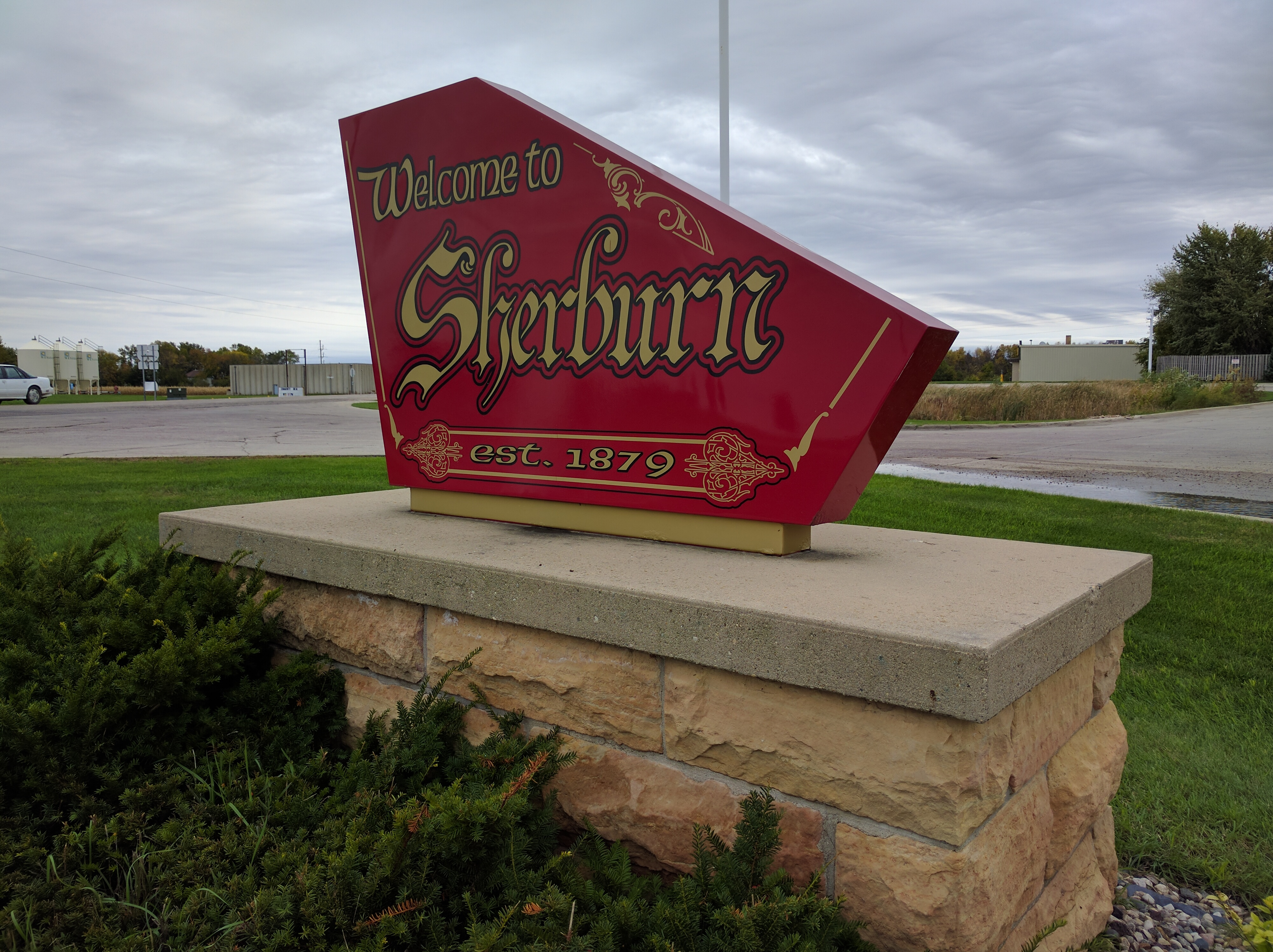
- Motto: "Pride of the Fox"
- Location in Martin County and the state of Minnesota
- Coordinates: 43°39′18″N 94°43′39″W
- Country: United States
- State: Minnesota
- County: Martin

Area
  - Total: 0.92 sq mi (2.38 km^{2})
  - Land: 0.92 sq mi (2.38 km^{2})
  - Water: 0 sq mi (0.00 km^{2})
- Elevation: 1,299 ft (396 m)

Population (2020)
  - Total: 1,058
  - Density: 1,151.9/sq mi (444.74/km^{2})
- Time zone: UTC-6 (Central (CST))
  - Summer (DST): UTC-5 (CDT)
- ZIP code: 56171
- Area code: 507
- FIPS code: 27-59620
- GNIS feature ID: 2395873
- Website: cityofsherburn.com

Sherburn is a city in Martin County, Minnesota, United States. The population was 1,058 at the 2020 census.

== History ==
The city of Sherburn is typical of many small communities throughout the Midwest and America, yet its history is unique in its own right. Sherburn celebrated its centennial in 1979, and since its early development in the mid to late 1800s; it has evolved due to many factors that have influenced communities of all sizes.

=== Early years ===
In the mid-1860s, George Archer had a sod tavern on the north banks of what was then Lake Manyaska located just south of Sherburn. Marked by a lone cedar tree, pioneer travelers used it as a rest stop as they traveled from Fairmont to Jackson. Soon there were pioneer settlers and a post office. As stagecoaches from Fairmont to Jackson and St. James to Estherville crossed the area, it was concluded that there was a definite need for a settlement.

The mid to late 1870s witnessed the arrival of many settlers to Martin County, primarily resulting from the growth of the railroad involving Winnebago and Fairmont. A company called Cargill, Bassett, and Hunting from La Crosse, Wisconsin, anticipated the railroad expanding west of Fairmont and, consequently, bought land in the area. As steam locomotives took water often, stops were located every 15 miles (24 km) or so, which may have contributed to the location of the Sherburn railroad station.

A post office has been in operation at Sherburn since 1879.

=== Name ===
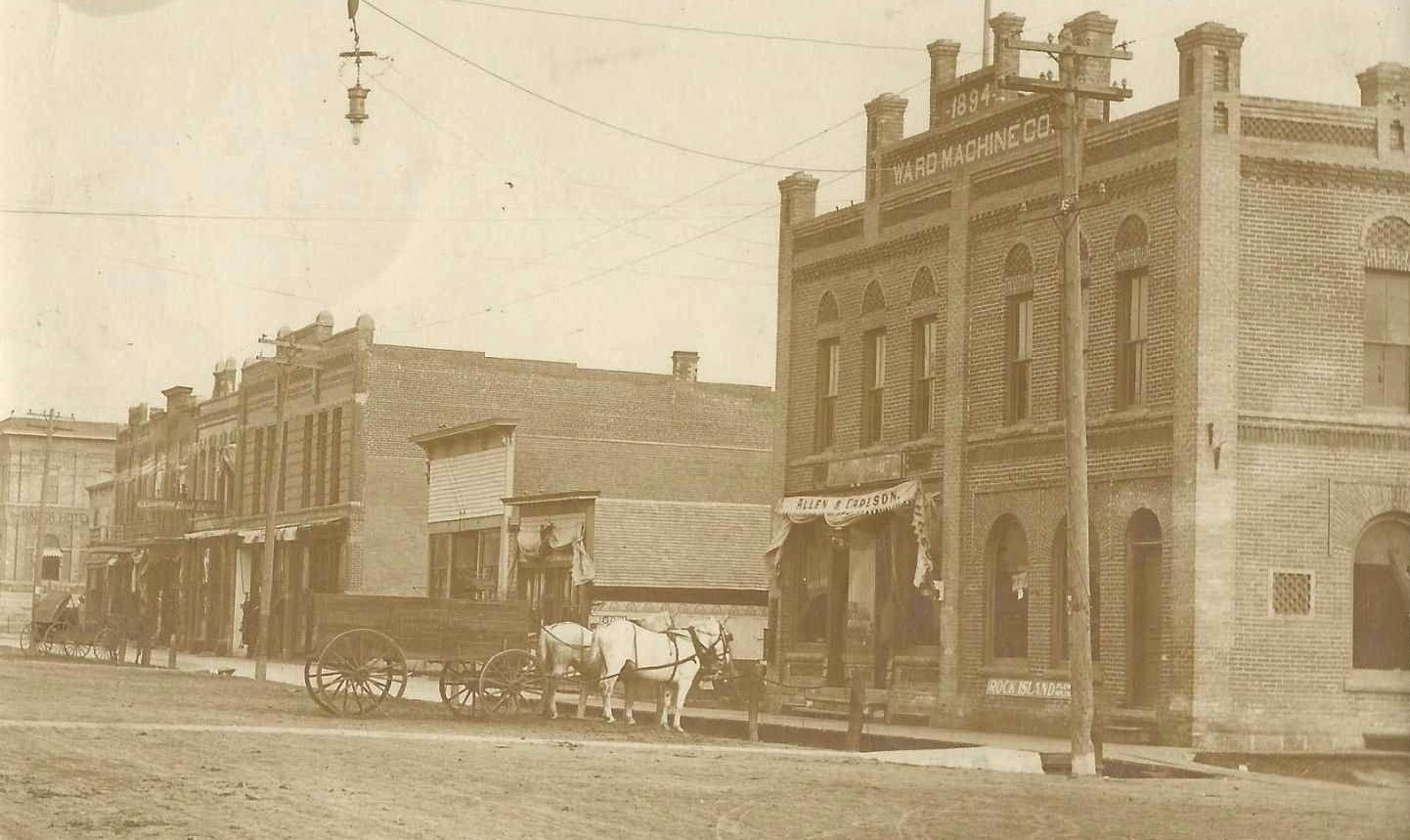
Downtown Sherburn in the early twentieth century

Several names were originally considered for the town site, including Lone Cedar, Huntington, and Vestal. But when the Southern Minnesota Railroad came through in October 1878, the name Sherburne was accepted in honor of Sherburne S. Merrill, general manager of the Chicago, Milwaukee and St. Paul Railroad. With the railroad's influence on the area, Sherburn's growth by 1879 had grown to fifteen buildings with a total value of approximately $8,000.00.

=== Biker Bank Gang ===
Sherburn was not without its share of excitement in its formative years. It was the site of one of the first, and deadliest, bank robberies in Martin County's history. The Bank of Sherburn was robbed in October 1896 by two brothers. They entered the bank and without warning shot and killed two people in the bank, one being an employee. The robbers made off on bicycles with cash estimated to be between $1,000.00 and $2,000.00. Apparently not particularly observant, they failed to notice $2,000.00 in gold and silver that remained in the till. Following their escape on bicycles, they were quickly pursued by Martin County Sheriff Hill, his deputies, and a posse of local citizens. One of the robbers was soon located at a farmhouse 14 miles (23 km) east of Elmore. Although surprised by the posse, he managed to fatally shoot Bancroft, Iowa, Sheriff William Gallion. The robber, in spite of being wounded, once more attempted an escape on his bicycle. When his escape appeared fruitless, and surrendering was apparently not in the cards, he put his weapon to his head and killed himself. The second robber was soon captured without incident in Lake Mills, Iowa. He confessed to the crime of robbery, but placed the blame for the murders of the two people in the Bank of Sherburn on his brother.

=== Fox Lake company ===
In 1920 several Sherburn businessmen organized the Fox Lake Park Company, issuing and selling stock to those interested in the development of the area north of Sherburn. Much of the land along the lake was platted into lots, a dance pavilion was built, and playground equipment and picnic tables were purchased. In addition, a bath house, a diving tower, a toboggan slide, and fishing piers were also constructed. Later, a tennis court and a baseball diamond, including grandstands, were added.

In 1932, the Fox Lake Golf Club was organized by ten businessmen. It started as a three-hole course, expanded to six holes, and finally became a nine-hole course. The Fox Lake Park Company was liquidated in 1944, and the dance pavilion and park area not owned by individuals were sold. The Fox Lake Golf Club purchased the land where the golf course was located.

=== "Dream Team" ===
Sherburn's history includes a dream that many communities share but few accomplish. That dream, winning a state high school athletic championship, was accomplished by the 1970 Sherburn Raiders high school basketball team during a time when only one state basketball champion was crowned. That team, coached by Dennis Christopherson, breezed through the regular season undefeated. Selected as the number one seed in District V, they defeated Fairmont, Delavan, and finally Wells for the championship. They then defeated Luverne and Jackson in Region II to reach the state tournament. In the state tournament, they first defeated Melrose 65–54, and then Marshall 71–60 to advance to the championship game. They would face heavily favored South St. Paul, a team that had been rated number one throughout most of the season. The Raiders, although much maligned by the Twin Cities media as being "hicks", went on to defeat the South St. Paul Packers by a score of 78–62. Governor Harold Levander, a South St. Paul resident, presenting the state championship trophy to the entire Sherburn High School team.

== Geography ==
Sherburn is in western Martin County, 13 miles (21 km) west of Fairmont, the county seat, and 16 miles (26 km) east of Jackson. Interstate 90 passes through the north end of Sherburn, connecting it to the two larger cities. Minnesota State Highway 4 passes through the center of Sherburn as North Main Street and West Front Street, leading north 24 miles (39 km) to St. James and south 21 miles (34 km) to Estherville, Iowa.

According to the U.S. Census Bureau, the city has a total area of 0.92 square miles (2.38 km^{2}), all land. Temperance Lake is to the east, just outside the city limits. Fox Lake is 1 mile (1.6 km) north of the city.

== Demographics ==
Historical population
Census	Pop.	Note	%±
1880	131		—
1890	316		141.2%
1900	891		182.0%
1910	814		−8.6%
1920	832		2.2%
1930	860		3.4%
1940	1,030		19.8%
1950	1,221		18.5%
1960	1,227		0.5%
1970	1,190		−3.0%
1980	1,275		7.1%
1990	1,105		−13.3%
2000	1,082		−2.1%
2010	1,137		5.1%
2020	1,058		−6.9%
U.S. Decennial Census

=== 2010 census ===
As of the census of 2010, there were 1,137 people, 500 households, and 307 families residing in the city. The population density was 1,249.5 inhabitants per square mile (482.4/km^{2}). There were 563 housing units at an average density of 618.7 per square mile (238.9/km^{2}). The racial makeup of the city was 98.7% White, 0.3% Asian, 0.1% Pacific Islander, 0.1% from other races, and 0.9% from two or more races. Hispanic or Latino of any race were 0.7% of the population.

There were 500 households, of which 27.8% had children under the age of 18 living with them, 49.4% were married couples living together, 7.8% had a female householder with no husband present, 4.2% had a male householder with no wife present, and 38.6% were non-families. 34.4% of all households were made up of individuals, and 19% had someone living alone who was 65 years of age or older. The average household size was 2.23 and the average family size was 2.87.

The median age in the city was 40.6 years. 23.7% of residents were under the age of 18; 6.9% were between the ages of 18 and 24; 23.9% were from 25 to 44; 26.2% were from 45 to 64; and 19.4% were 65 years of age or older. The gender makeup of the city was 49.3% male and 50.7% female.

=== 2000 census ===
As of the census of 2000, there were 1,082 people, 484 households, and 285 families residing in the city. The population density was 1,220.6 inhabitants per square mile (471.3/km^{2}). There were 535 housing units at an average density of 603.5 per square mile (233.0/km^{2}). The racial makeup of the city was 99.63% White, 0.09% Native American, 0.09% Asian, 0.09% from other races, and 0.09% from two or more races. Hispanic or Latino of any race were 0.65% of the population.

There were 484 households, out of which 26.9% had children under the age of 18 living with them, 47.1% were married couples living together, 9.1% had a female householder with no husband present, and 41.1% were non-families. 38.6% of all households were made up of individuals, and 22.5% had someone living alone who was 65 years of age or older. The average household size was 2.21 and the average family size was 2.95.

In the city, the population was spread out, with 24.8% under the age of 18, 6.2% from 18 to 24, 26.1% from 25 to 44, 21.8% from 45 to 64, and 21.2% who were 65 years of age or older. The median age was 41 years. For every 100 females, there were 89.2 males. For every 100 females age 18 and over, there were 88.4 males.

The median income for a household in the city was $26,643, and the median income for a family was $35,132. Males had a median income of $26,964 versus $17,313 for females. The per capita income for the city was $15,079. About 5.6% of families and 10.6% of the population were below the poverty line, including 9.5% of those under age 18 and 12.3% of those age 65 or over.

== Education ==
In 1988, Sherburn consolidated with neighboring Trimont and Welcome schools to form the Martin County West School District.

== Government ==
In 1999, Sherburn combined its police department with that of nearby Welcome. The department is currently known as the "Sherburn/Welcome Police Department".

== Notable people ==
- Astronaut Dale Gardner was born in neighboring Fairmont and spent part of his childhood growing up in Sherburn
- U.S. Marine Corps Major General August Larson served in combat and staff roles during his career, and was a veteran of the Battle of Okinawa and other actions in the Pacific Theater of World War II.
- Brandon Williamson, pitcher for the Cincinnati Reds of Major League Baseball, attended high school in Sherburn.
