= Fox Lake =

Fox Lake may refer to:

== Inhabited places ==
=== Canada ===
- Fox Lake, Alberta, an unincorporated community in northern Alberta
- Fox Lake (Devon), a lake in Halifax Regional Municipality, Nova Scotia
- Fox Lake (Goffs), a lake in Halifax Regional Municipality, Nova Scotia
- Fox Lake (Lunenburg), a lake in the Municipal District Of Lunenburg, in Nova Scotia
- Fox Lake (Timberlea), a lake of Halifax Regional Municipality, Nova Scotia

=== United States ===
- Fox Lake, Illinois, a village in Lake and McHenry Counties, Illinois
- Fox Lake Hills, Illinois, a census-designated place in Lake County, Illinois
- Fox Lake (Angola, Indiana), a national historic district in Steuben County, Indiana
- Fox Lake, Minnesota, an unincorporated community in Martin County, Minnesota
- Fox Lake Township, Minnesota, in Martin County, Minnesota
- Fox Lake, Montana, a census-designated place in Richland County, Montana
- Fox Lake Wildlife Area, in Athens County, Ohio
- Fox Lake, Wisconsin, a city in Dodge County, Wisconsin
- Fox Lake (town), Wisconsin, a town in Dodge County, Wisconsin

== Lakes ==
=== In the United States ===
- Fox Lake (Florida), a lake in Highlands County, Florida
- Lake Fox, a lake in Polk County, Florida
- Fox Lake, part of the Chain O'Lakes in Lake and McHenry Counties, Illinois
- Fox Lake, a Muskegon County, Michigan
- Fox Lake (Martin County, Minnesota), a lake in Martin County, Minnesota
- Fox Lake, a Murray County, Minnesota
- Fox Lake, a Rice County, Minnesota
- Fox Lake, a Richland County, Montana
- Fox Lake (Beadle County, South Dakota), Beadle County, South Dakota
- Fox Lake (Deuel County, South Dakota), Deuel County, South Dakota
- Fox Lake (Wisconsin), a lake in Dodge County, Wisconsin

=== Other lakes ===
- Fox Lake (Cochrane District), a lake in the Cochrane District, Ontario
- Fox Lake (Kings County), a lake in Kings County, Nova Scotia,
- Fox Sagar Lake, a lake in Hyderabad, India

== Other uses ==
- Fox Hill Lake, a park in Bowie, Maryland
- Fox Lake station, a station on Metra's Milwaukee District North Line in Fox Lake, Illinois
- Fox Lake Cree Nation, a First Nations government in Manitoba
