= Minnesota State Highway 263 =

State highway in Minnesota, United States

Trunk Highway 263
- MN 263 highlighted in red

Route information
- Maintained by MnDOT
- Length: 11.226 mi (18.066 km)
- Existed: July 1, 1949–April 1, 2025

Major junctions
- South end: CR 8 in Ceylon
- North end: I-90 / CR 27 near Welcome

Location
- Country: United States
- State: Minnesota
- Counties: Martin

Highway system
- Minnesota Trunk Highway System; Interstate; US; State; Legislative; Scenic
← MN 258	→ MN 264

Minnesota State Highway 263 (MN 263) was a 11.226-mile-long (18.066 km) highway in southwest Minnesota, which ran from its intersection with Martin County State-Aid Highway 8 in Ceylon and continued north along the current Martin County State-Aid Highway 27 to its northern terminus at its interchange with Interstate 90 near Welcome, nine miles west of Fairmont. The highway was officially turned back to Martin County, Minnesota jurisdiction on April 1, 2025.

== Route description ==
Highway 263 served as a north–south connector route in southwest Minnesota between Ceylon and Interstate 90 near Welcome.

The former Highway 263 is also known as Main Street in Ceylon. The former route follows Guide Street in Welcome.

The former route of Highway 263 has been renumbered as Martin County State-Aid Highway 8 from Ceylon traveling east to the intersection with Martin County State-Aid Highway 27, where the road curves to the north and is numbered as part of County Highway 27 for the remainder of the former route.

== History ==
Highway 263 was authorized on July 1, 1949.

The route was paved in 1951.

The 2021 Minnesota Legislature authorized removal of the route, to become effective when a turnback agreement is reached with Martin County.

By mid-summer 2023, Highway 263 had been marked with the appropriate county highway markers, and the turnback to Martin County was officially completed on April 1, 2025.

== Major intersections ==
The entire route is in Martin County.

Location	mi	km	Destinations	Notes
Ceylon	0.000	0.000	CR 8 west (Main Street), CR 125 north (Clark Street)	
Ceylon	0.213	0.343	CR 6 (Railroad Street)	
Lake Belt Township	1.080	1.738	CR 8 east	
Tenhassen Township	3.697	5.950	CR 14	
Manyaska Township	6.194	9.968	CR 22 west	
Rolling Green Township	6.692	10.770	CR 22 east	
Welcome	9.695	15.603	CR 26 (120th Street)	Old U.S. 16
Fox Lake–Fraser township line	11.094– 11.233	17.854– 18.078	I-90 / CR 27 north	Interchange
1.000 mi = 1.609 km; 1.000 km = 0.621 mi
