= Minnesota State Highway 262 =

State highway in Minnesota, United States

Trunk Highway 262
- MN 262 highlighted in red

Route information
- Maintained by MnDOT
- Length: 2.0 mi (3.2 km)
- Existed: July 1, 1949–2007

Major junctions
- South end: I-90 at Pleasant Prairie Township, east of Fairmont
- North end: CSAH 53 at Granada

Location
- Country: United States
- State: Minnesota
- Counties: Martin

Highway system
- Minnesota Trunk Highway System; Interstate; US; State; Legislative; Scenic
← MN 258	→ MN 263

Minnesota State Highway 262 (MN 262) was a short highway in south-central Minnesota, which ran from its interchange with Interstate 90 in Pleasant Prairie Township; six miles east of Fairmont; and continued north to its northern terminus at its intersection with Martin County Road 53 in the town of Granada. The route was a state highway from 1949 to 2007. In the present day, the route is known as Martin County Road 53.

== Route description ==
Highway 262 was 2 miles (3.2 km) in length; and had passed through the communities of Pleasant Prairie Township, Center Creek Township, and Granada. The route had followed Main Street in Granada and 260th Avenue outside the city.

It was legally defined as Legislative Route 262 in the Minnesota Statutes § 161.115(193).

== History ==
Highway 262 was authorized on July 1, 1949. It was paved in 1953. The route was removed in 2007, becoming part of County Road 53.

== Major intersections ==
The entire route was in Martin County.

Location	mi	km	Destinations	Notes
Pleasant Prairie Township	0.000	0.000	I-90 – Fairmont, Blue Earth	Southern terminus
Granada	1.199	1.930	CSAH 32 east	
Granada	1.976	3.180	CSAH 34 west / CSAH 53 north / CR 134 east	Northern terminus; continues north as County Route 53
1.000 mi = 1.609 km; 1.000 km = 0.621 mi
