= Imogen =

Imogen or Imogene may refer to:

== Places ==
- Imogene, Iowa, a city
- Imogene, Minnesota, a populated place
- Imogene, South Dakota, an unincorporated community
- Imogene Pass, a mountain pass in the San Juan Mountains of Colorado
- Imogene Lake, Idaho
- Imogene Peak, Idaho
- Lake Imogene, Martin County, Minnesota

== People and fictional characters ==
- Imogen (given name), a feminine given name, including a list of people and fictional characters named either Imogen or Imogene.

== Arts and entertainment ==
- Imogen (novel), a 1978 romance by Jilly Cooper
- Imogen (Cymbeline) from William Shakespeare's play Cymbeline
- Imogen (video game), a BBC Micro computer game
- Imogene, original title of Girl Most Likely, a 2012 American comedy film
- "Imogene", a piece of instrumental music written and recorded in 1967 by Les Reed

== Ships ==
- HMS Imogen, six Royal Navy ships named either Imogen or Imogene

== See also ==
- Innogen
- 2015–16 UK and Ireland windstorm season#Storm Imogen
