= Lake Fremont =

Lake Fremont or Fremont Lake may refer to:

- Fremont Lake (Murray County, Minnesota)
- Lake Fremont Township, Martin County, Minnesota
