= Princess Kay of the Milky Way =

Minnesota dairy industry competition

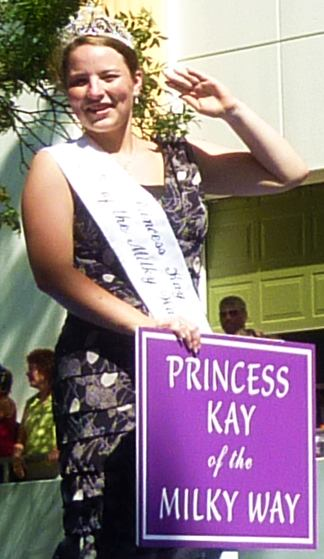
Katie Miron, Princess Kay of the Milky Way, 2010, was a 19-year-old student at the University of Minnesota.

Princess Kay of the Milky Way is the title awarded to the winner of the statewide Minnesota Dairy Princess Program, an annual competition organized by the Midwest Dairy Association. During her one-year term, the Princess Kay of the Milky Way serves as official good-will ambassador for the Minnesota dairy industry. The Princess is crowned every year at the Minnesota State Fair, and receives a scholarship. The crowning of Princess Kay annually garners statewide as well as national media coverage.

The competition was the idea of Lew Conlon, who managed the Minnesota Dairy Industry Committee. The name "Princess Kay of the Milky Way" was selected from over 10,000 entries in a 1954 contest to name the Minnesota dairy princess.

== Princess program ==
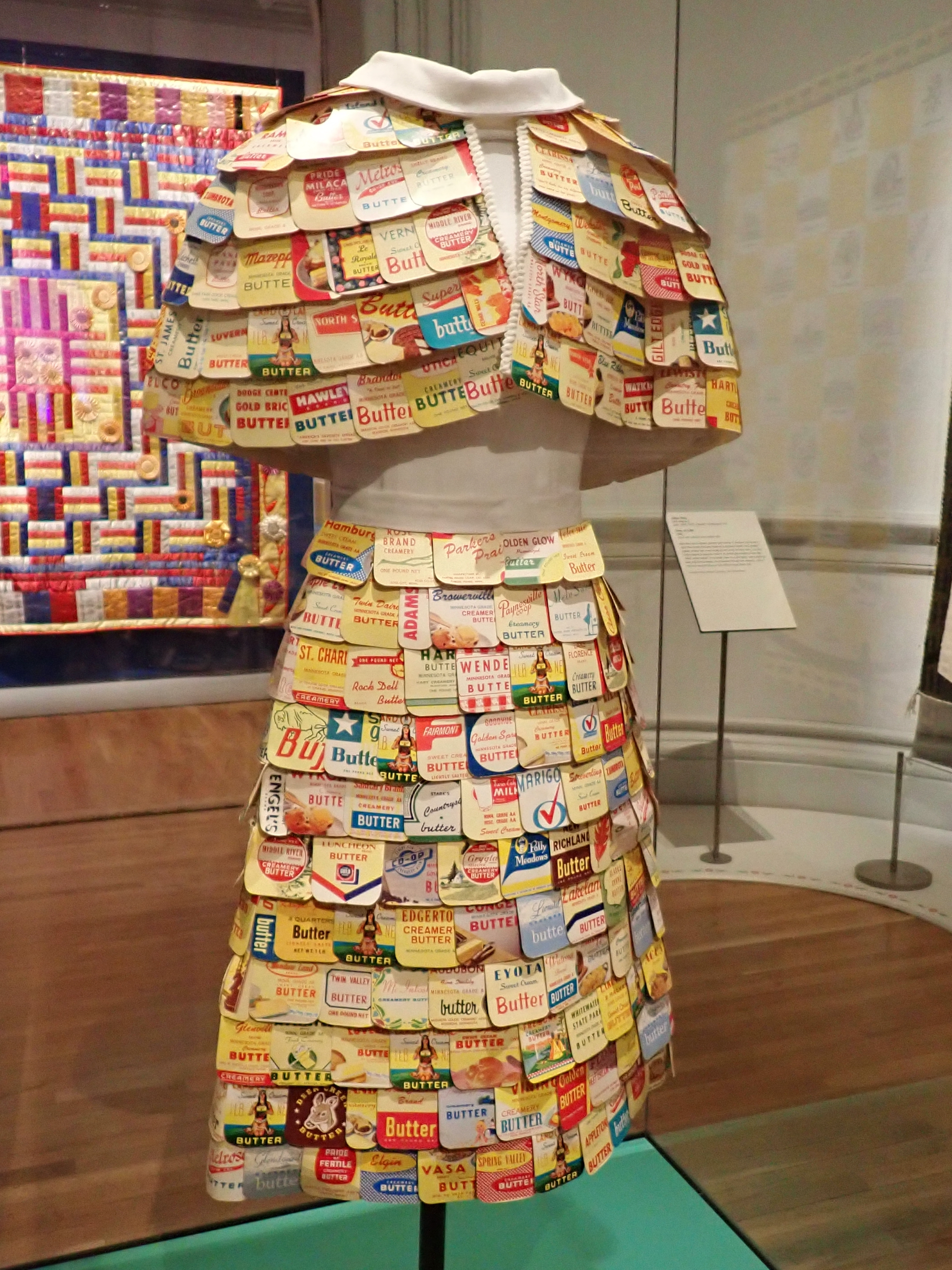
Dress made from butter cartons worn by the 1965 princess

Individual counties in Minnesota may select Dairy Princesses who meet the eligibility requirements listed below. These princesses may then advance to the Princess Kay of the Milky Way finalists competition held each spring. Of the nearly 100 princesses in the competition, 10 finalists are selected, and are then required to take on public relations roles at the Minnesota State Fair. The new Princess Kay is selected just before the state fair, and the coronation takes place the night before the state fair opens. The crowned Princess Kay then makes numerous media and public appearances during the fair's 12 days and throughout the coming year on behalf of Minnesota dairy farmers.

Contestants must be U.S. citizens, and their parents, guardians, or siblings must be actively involved in the production of dairy products. They must also have completed a high school education, be under the age of 24, and be unmarried with no children. Candidates are judged on "communication skills, personality, general knowledge of the dairy industry and its products, and their commitment to dairy promotion."

== Butter sculptures ==
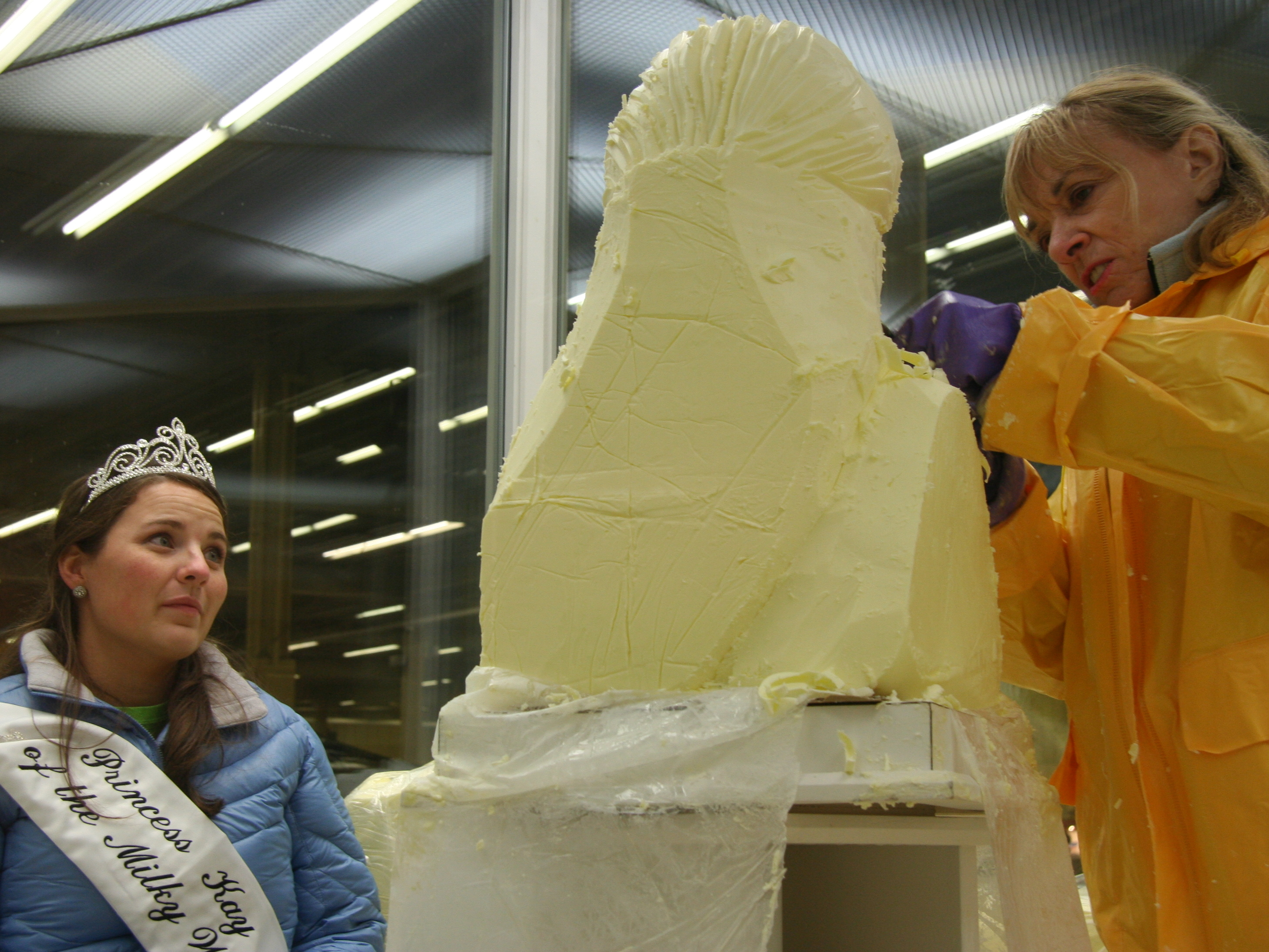
Katie Miron, 2010 Princess Kay of the Milky Way, sits for a butter sculptor at the Minnesota State Fair

Since 1965, sculptures of the winning Princess Kay and other finalists have been carved, one per day, at the Minnesota State Fair. Recent butter sculptures have been carved out of a 90-pound block of Grade A butter, in a walk-in, glass-walled refrigerator. The butter is manufactured by Associated Milk Producers in New Ulm, Minnesota. The butter carving booth is one of the most popular exhibits at the Fair. The carving of the butter sculpture takes 6–8 hours per finalist. For nearly 40 years, Linda Christensen has sculpted the Princesses' butter sculptures. Princesses take their butter sculpture home with them at the end of the Fair.

== Princesses ==
Year	Name	County	Town
1954	Eleanor Maley Thatcher	Mower County	Grand Meadow
1955	Ruth Marie Peterson Faber	Mower County	Lansing
1956	Barbara Bossus Bohrer	Crow Wing County	Brainerd
1957	Judy Merritt	Dakota County	Lakeville
1958	Diane Schroeder Dunn	Polk County	Fertile
1959	Betty Jax Cole	Mower County	Adams
1960	Marilyn Christianson Styve	Freeborn County	Corning
1961	Diane Kramer	Nobles County	Worthington
1962	Kathy Hjelle Martens	Marshall County	Argyle
1963	Audrey Meyer Carlsen	Freeborn County	Clarks Grove
1964	Karen Bracken Geier	Lincoln County	Verdi
1965	Mary Ann Titrud Springer	Todd County	Clarissa
1966	Linda Kottke	McLeod County	Glencoe
1967	Carla Rae Larson Moll	Lyon County	Minneota
1968	Linda Louwagie Brisbane	Lyon County	Marshall
1969	Janelle Gatzke Hahn	Fillmore County	Preston
1970	Gayle Krogstad Solum	Norman County	Ada
1971	Mary Ann Glawe Hardy	Becker County	Detroit Lakes
1972	Madge Stapleton Johnson	Houston County	Caledonia
1973	Lori Anshus Redmer	Yellow Medicine County	Canby
1974	Juliet Tessmer Garbow	Hennepin County	Rogers
1975	Wanda Ponto Sackter	Kanabec County	Mora
1976	Kathy Zeman	Steele County	Owatonna
1977	Beth Aarsvold Olson	Winona County	Peterson
1978	Kari Schroht Reuvers	Steele County	Owatonna
1979	Tamara Pennings Goehring	Kandiyohi County	Blomkest
1980	Jean Lindig Kessler	Pine County	Pine City
1981	Jill Jensen Douglas	Martin County	East Chain
1982	Janet Forner Bosch	Carver County	Chaska
1983	Lisa Schaffer Coyne	Dakota County	Cannon Falls
1984	Barbara Bianchi Clayton	Nicollet County	Gibbon
1985	Stephanie Dickey Bjella	Clearwater County	Leonard
1986	Yvonne Moerke Devito	Grant County	Ashby
1987	Amy Polikowsky Mesenburg	Olmsted County	Byron
1988	Marie Dick	Cottonwood County	Bingham Lake
1989	Katie Scott Johnson	Otter Tail County	Battle Lake
1990	Beth Mesenbring-Mastre	Carver County	Cologne
1991	Julie Felger Mulford	Kanabec County	Mora
1992	Bridget Hendrickson Jacobson	Fillmore County	Preston
1993	Ann Erickson Gibbs	Otter Tail County	Battle Lake
1994	Julie Sauber Antonutti	Dakota County	Lakeville
1995	Kimberly Mallery Gusick	Chisago County	Shafer
1996	Kristi Ann Pettis Osterlund	Sibley County	Winthrop
1997	Kari Skiba Stanek	Anoka/Isanti	North Branch
1998	Jenny Kinnunen Schlauderaff	Wadena County	Menahga
1999	Renae Jorgens Gebhart	Yellow Medicine County	Boyd
2000	Bridget Hollermann Klein	Pope County	Farewell
2001	Kelsey Olson	Fillmore County	Spring Valley
2002	Sarah Olson Schmidt	McLeod County	Hutchinson
2003	Tae Vander Kooi Nordby	Nobles County	Worthington
2004	Christina Rettmann	Renville County	Buffalo Lake
2005	Rebekah Dammann Reuter	McLeod County	Lester Prairie
2006	Audrey Mohr	Brown County	New Ulm
2007	Ann Miron	Washington County	Hugo
2008	Kristy Mussman	Steele County	Claremont
2009	Elizabeth Olson	McLeod County	Hutchinson
2010	Katie Miron	Washington County	Hugo
2011	Mary Zahurones	Morrison County	Pierz
2012	Christine Reitsma	Stearns County	Sauk Centre
2013	MarJenna McWilliam Koehler	Polk County	Winger
2014	Jeni Haler	Carver County	Norwood Young America
2015	Kyla Mauk	Wright County	Howard Lake
2016	Haley Hinrichs	Goodhue County	Goodhue
2017	Emily Annexstad	Nicollet County	St. Peter
2018	Rebekka Paskewitz	Todd County	Browerville
2019	Amy Kyllo	Olmsted County	Byron
2020	Brenna Connelly	Olmsted County	Byron
2021	Anna Euerle	Meeker County	Litchfield
2022	Rachel Rynda	LeSueur County	Montgomery
2023	Emma Kuball	Rice County	Waterville
2024	Rachel Visser	McLeod County	Hutchinson
2025	Malorie Thorson	Wright County	Waverly
