= Imogene, Minnesota =

- Unincorporated community
- Location within Minnesota Location within the United States
- Coordinates: 43°39′37″N 94°20′44″W
- Country: United States
- State: Minnesota
- County: Martin
- Township: Pleasant Prairie
- Elevation: 1,129 ft (344 m)
- Time zone: UTC-6 (Central (CST))
  - Summer (DST): UTC-5 (CDT)
- Area code: 507
- GNIS feature ID: 645391

Imogene is an unincorporated community located in Martin County in the U.S. state of Minnesota. Imogene is on Minnesota State Highway 262 approximately two miles south of Granada and I-90.

== History ==
Imogene was platted in 1900. It was named after Imogen, from Shakespeare's play Cymbeline. A post office was established as Imogen in 1901 and remained in operation until 1913.
