= Nash =

Nash or NASH may refer to:

== Places ==
=== United Kingdom ===
- Nash, Buckinghamshire
- Nash, London (historically Kent), a hamlet near Keston in the London Borough of Bromley
- Nash, Newport, Wales
- Nash, south Shropshire, a small village and parish in southern Shropshire
- Nash, Telford and Wrekin, a "lost" village near Wrockwardine, Shropshire
- Nash Lee, Buckinghamshire
- Nash Mills, Hertfordshire
- Nash Point, a headland in the Vale of Glamorgan
- Rodd, Nash and Little Brampton, Herefordshire, includes the hamlet of Nash

=== United States ===
- Nash, California, an unincorporated community, former name of Nashmead
- Nash, North Dakota, a census-designated place and unincorporated community
- Nash, Oklahoma, a town
- Nash, Texas, a city
- Nash County, North Carolina

=== Other places ===
- Nash, Iran, a village

== People and fictional characters ==
- Nash (surname), including a list of people and fictional characters
- Nash (given name), a list of people
- Nash the Slash (1948–2014), stage name of Canadian rock musician James Plewman

== Arts, entertainment, and media ==
=== Fictional characters ===
- Nash, Street Fighter character Charlie
- Nash Brennan, in the American soap opera One Life to Live
- Nash Bridges, in the American series of the same name
- Nash Gorey, in M.A.S.K.
- Nash Latkje, in Genso Suikogaidejkkn Vol.1 and Suikoden III
- Nash Wells, in The Flash
- Nash, a waitress in the 1986 film The Hitcher

=== Other arts, entertainment, and media ===
- NASH (band), formerly D'NASH, Spanish
- Nash (brand), a US media brand
- Nash (sculpture), 1978–1979 by Lee Kelly, in Portland, Oregon, US
- Hex (board game) or Nash

== Businesses ==
- Nash Motors, an American automobile manufacturer
- Nash & Thompson, an aircraft equipment manufacturer
- Nash Format, a publishing house based in Kyiv, Ukraine

== Other uses ==
- Gamma2 Sagittarii, a star also known as Nash
- Sodium hydrosulfide (NaSH)
- Non-alcoholic steatohepatitis, a liver disease
- Nash (tugboat)
- North Allegheny Senior High, Wexford, Pennsylvania, US
- The acrophonic name of the letter En (Cyrillic) in the old Russian alphabet

== See also ==
- Gnash (disambiguation)
- Nashville (disambiguation)
  - Nashville, Tennessee, the state capital of and most populous city in Tennessee
