= Elm Creek Township =

Elm Creek Township may refer to the following townships in the United States:

- Elm Creek Township, Martin County, Minnesota
- Elm Creek Township, Buffalo County, Nebraska
- Elm Creek Township, Saline County, Kansas
- Elm Creek Township, Marshall County, Kansas
