= Fraser Township =

Fraser Township may refer to the following places in the United States:

- Fraser Township, Michigan
- Fraser Township, Martin County, Minnesota
