= Pleasant Prairie =

Pleasant Prairie can refer to:

- Pleasant Prairie Township, Minnesota
- Pleasant Prairie, Wisconsin
