= Fox Lake, Minnesota =

- Unincorporated community
- Location within Minnesota Location within the United States
- Coordinates: 43°40′36″N 94°39′32″W
- Country: United States
- State: Minnesota
- County: Martin
- Township: Fox Lake
- Elevation: 1,253 ft (382 m)
- Time zone: UTC-6 (Central (CST))
  - Summer (DST): UTC-5 (CDT)
- Area code: 507
- GNIS feature ID: 643865

Fox Lake is an unincorporated community in Martin County, in the U.S. state of Minnesota.

== History ==
Fox Lake was platted in 1899. It took its name from nearby Fox Lake.
