= Nashville (disambiguation) =

Nashville is the capital of the U.S. state of Tennessee.

Nashville may also refer to:

== Places ==
=== United States ===
- Nashville, Arkansas
- Nashville, California, unincorporated community
- Nashville, Georgia
- Nashville, Illinois
- Nashville, Indiana
- Nashville, Hancock County, Indiana, unincorporated community
- Nashville, Iowa, unincorporated community
- Nashville, Kansas
- Nashville, Michigan
- Nashville, Missouri, unincorporated community
- Nashville, Nebraska, unincorporated community
- Nashville, a hamlet in Hanover, Chautauqua County, New York
- Nashville, a hamlet in Wheatfield, Niagara County, New York
- Nashville, North Carolina
- Nashville, Ohio
- Nashville, Oregon, unincorporated community
- Nashville, Texas, also known as Nashville-on-the-Brazos, unincorporated community
- Nashville, Wisconsin, a town
- Nashville (community), Wisconsin, an unincorporated community
- Nashville Center, Minnesota, unincorporated community
- Nashville Historic District (Nashua, New Hampshire)
- Nashville Plantation, Maine
- Nashville Township, Martin County, Minnesota

=== Elsewhere ===
- Nashville, Ontario, Canada

== Music ==
- Nashville (Bill Frisell album), 1997
- Nashville (Andy Williams album), 1991
- Nashville (Josh Rouse album), 2005
- "Nashville", a song recorded by Stonewall Jackson and others
- Nashville!, a commercial music channel on XM Satellite Radio controlled by Clear Channel Communications
- An E9 tuning sometimes used for ten-string pedal steel guitar
- Nashville sound, a subgenre of country music
- Nashville Symphony, an orchestra
- Nashville tuning, a tuning for a six-string guitar

== Film and television ==
- Nashville (film), a 1975 American musical film directed by Robert Altman
- Nashville (2007 TV series), a Fox reality series
- Nashville (2012 TV series), an ABC and CMT drama series
- "Nashville" (Master of None), a 2015 TV episode

== Other uses ==
- Nashville High School (Arkansas)
- Nashville International Airport, Tennessee
- Nashville Predators, an ice hockey team based in Nashville
- Nashville SC, a MLS club based in Nashville
- CSS Nashville, two Confederate States Navy ships
- USS Nashville, three United States Navy ships
- Virginia Slims of Nashville, a defunct tennis tournament
- Windows Nashville, Microsoft codename for the canceled Windows 96 operating system
