= Center Creek =

Center Creek may refer to:

- Center Creek (Minnesota)
- Center Creek (Missouri)
- Center Creek (Texas)
