= Wilbert, Minnesota =

- Unincorporated community
- Location within Minnesota Location within the United States
- Coordinates: 43°32′38″N 94°32′22″W
- Country: United States
- State: Minnesota
- County: Martin
- Township: Tenhassen
- Elevation: 1,250 ft (380 m)
- Time zone: UTC-6 (Central (CST))
  - Summer (DST): UTC-5 (CDT)
- Area code: 507
- GNIS feature ID: 654129

Wilbert is an unincorporated community in Tenhassen Township, Martin County, Minnesota, United States.
