= Cedar Township, Minnesota =

Cedar Township is the name of two places in the US state of Minnesota:

- Cedar Township, Marshall County, Minnesota
- Cedar Township, Martin County, Minnesota

== See also ==
- Cedar Township (disambiguation)
