= Deer Lake (Florida) =

Lake in northern Highlands County, Florida, United States

- Location within Florida Location within the United States
- Location: Highlands County, Florida
- Coordinates: 27°36′33″N 81°28′27″W
- Type: lake
- Surface area: 27.78 acres (0.1124 km^{2})
- Surface elevation: 95 feet (29 m)

Deer Lake is a small somewhat round-shaped lake in northern Highlands County, Florida. It is just southeast of Luck Lake and about a half mile west of Fox Lake. It has a surface area of 27.78 acres (11.24 ha). The lake is found at an elevation of 95 feet (29 m). Deer Lake is bounded on the west by houses and Deer Lake Road. It is bounded on all other sides by citrus groves. Since it is surrounded by private property, there is no public access to this lake.
