= Gnash =

Gnash may refer to:

- Gnash (software), a Flash (SWF) media player
- Gnash (musician) (born 1993), American DJ
- Gnash (mascot), the mascot of Nashville Predators in NHL

== See also ==
- Nash (disambiguation)
- Ganache, a mixture of chocolate and cream
