= Bob Waltman =

American politician

Bob Joe "Bobby Joe" Waltman

Member of the Minnesota House of Representatives
- In office 1983–1994

Personal details
- Born: August 12, 1933 Ceylon, Minnesota
- Died: March 16, 2010 (aged 76) Grand Meadow, Minnesota
- Party: Republican
- Education: Ceylon High School
- Occupation: Businessman, Politician

Military service
- Branch/service: United States Air Force
- Years of service: 1951–1956

Bob Joe "Bobby Joe" Waltman (August 12, 1933 – March 16, 2010) was an American politician and businessman.

Born in Ceylon, Minnesota, Waltman graduated from Ceylon High School in 1951. He then served in the United States Air Force from 1951 to 1956. He then worked as an airplane mechanic in Phoenix, Arizona and St. Louis, Missouri. In 1961, Waltman moved with his wife and family to Rochester, Minnesota; he worked at Gopher Aviation. In 1963, Waltman, his wife, and family moved to Elgin, Minnesota where they owned a grocery store. From 1983 to 1994, Waltman served in the Minnesota House of Representatives and was a Republican. Waltman died at his home in Grand Meadow, Minnesota.
