= Jay Township, Martin County, Minnesota =

Jay Township, Minnesota
- Township
- Location within the state of Minnesota Jay Township, Minnesota (the United States)
- Coordinates: 43°38′15″N 94°48′14″W
- Country: United States
- State: Minnesota
- County: Martin

Area
  - Total: 36.3 sq mi (93.9 km^{2})
  - Land: 36.3 sq mi (93.9 km^{2})
  - Water: 0 sq mi (0.0 km^{2})
- Elevation: 1,322 ft (403 m)

Population (2000)
  - Total: 269
  - Density: 7.5/sq mi (2.9/km^{2})
- Time zone: UTC-6 (Central (CST))
  - Summer (DST): UTC-5 (CDT)
- FIPS code: 27-31778
- GNIS feature ID: 0664576

Jay Township is a township in Martin County, Minnesota, United States. The population was 269 at the 2000 census.

Jay Township was organized in 1872, and named for John Jay (1745–1829), American politician and jurist.

== Geography ==
According to the United States Census Bureau, the township has a total area of 36.3 square miles (94 km^{2}), of which 36.3 square miles (94 km^{2}) is land and 0.03% is water.

== Demographics ==
As of the census of 2000, there were 269 people, 97 households, and 80 families residing in the township. The population density was 7.4 inhabitants per square mile (2.9/km^{2}). There were 105 housing units at an average density of 2.9 per square mile (1.1/km^{2}). The racial makeup of the township was 97.77% White, 0.37% Asian, 0.74% from other races, and 1.12% from two or more races. Hispanic or Latino of any race were 1.12% of the population.

There were 97 households, out of which 36.1% had children under the age of 18 living with them, 77.3% were married couples living together, 4.1% had a female householder with no husband present, and 16.5% were non-families. 14.4% of all households were made up of individuals, and 7.2% had someone living alone who was 65 years of age or older. The average household size was 2.77 and the average family size was 3.06.

In the township the population was spread out, with 30.5% under the age of 18, 6.7% from 18 to 24, 24.5% from 25 to 44, 22.3% from 45 to 64, and 16.0% who were 65 years of age or older. The median age was 40 years. For every 100 females, there were 97.8 males. For every 100 females age 18 and over, there were 114.9 males.

The median income for a household in the township was $37,500, and the median income for a family was $39,688. Males had a median income of $30,385 versus $21,667 for females. The per capita income for the township was $16,381. About 10.1% of families and 8.2% of the population were below the poverty line, including 1.3% of those under the age of eighteen and 17.4% of those 65 or over.
