= East Chain, Minnesota =

- Unincorporated community
- Location within Minnesota Location within the United States
- Coordinates: 43°33′32″N 94°21′55″W
- Country: United States
- State: Minnesota
- County: Martin
- Township: East Chain
- Elevation: 1,168 ft (356 m)
- Time zone: UTC-6 (Central (CST))
  - Summer (DST): UTC-5 (CDT)
- Area code: 507
- GNIS feature ID: 643060

East Chain is an unincorporated community in East Chain Township, Martin County, Minnesota, United States.
