= Galena Township, Martin County, Minnesota =

Galena Township, Minnesota
- Township
- Location within the state of Minnesota Galena Township, Minnesota (the United States)
- Coordinates: 43°47′52″N 94°41′4″W
- Country: United States
- State: Minnesota
- County: Martin

Area
  - Total: 35.4 sq mi (91.6 km^{2})
  - Land: 34.9 sq mi (90.3 km^{2})
  - Water: 0.50 sq mi (1.3 km^{2})
- Elevation: 1,220 ft (372 m)

Population (2000)
  - Total: 237
  - Density: 6.7/sq mi (2.6/km^{2})
- Time zone: UTC-6 (Central (CST))
  - Summer (DST): UTC-5 (CDT)
- FIPS code: 27-23030
- GNIS feature ID: 0664240

Galena Township is a township in Martin County, Minnesota, United States. The population was 237 at the 2000 census.

Galena Township was named after Galena, Illinois, the native home of a share of the early settlers.

== Geography ==
According to the United States Census Bureau, the township has a total area of 35.4 square miles (92 km^{2}), of which 34.9 square miles (90 km^{2}) is land and 0.5 square miles (1.3 km^{2}) (1.44%) is water.

== Demographics ==
As of the census of 2000, there were 237 people, 95 households, and 72 families residing in the township. The population density was 6.8 inhabitants per square mile (2.6/km^{2}). There were 100 housing units at an average density of 2.9 per square mile (1.1/km^{2}). The racial makeup of the township was 99.58% White, and 0.42% from two or more races.

There were 95 households, out of which 34.7% had children under the age of 18 living with them, 70.5% were married couples living together, 2.1% had a female householder with no husband present, and 24.2% were non-families. 24.2% of all households were made up of individuals, and 9.5% had someone living alone who was 65 years of age or older. The average household size was 2.49 and the average family size was 2.93.

In the township the population was spread out, with 24.1% under the age of 18, 6.3% from 18 to 24, 25.3% from 25 to 44, 26.6% from 45 to 64, and 17.7% who were 65 years of age or older. The median age was 43 years. For every 100 females, there were 100.8 males. For every 100 females age 18 and over, there were 111.8 males.

The median income for a household in the township was $38,958, and the median income for a family was $43,125. Males had a median income of $26,250 versus $19,583 for females. The per capita income for the township was $17,578. About 2.6% of families and 3.0% of the population were below the poverty line, including none of those under the age of eighteen or sixty five or over.
