= Linda Christensen =

American butter artist

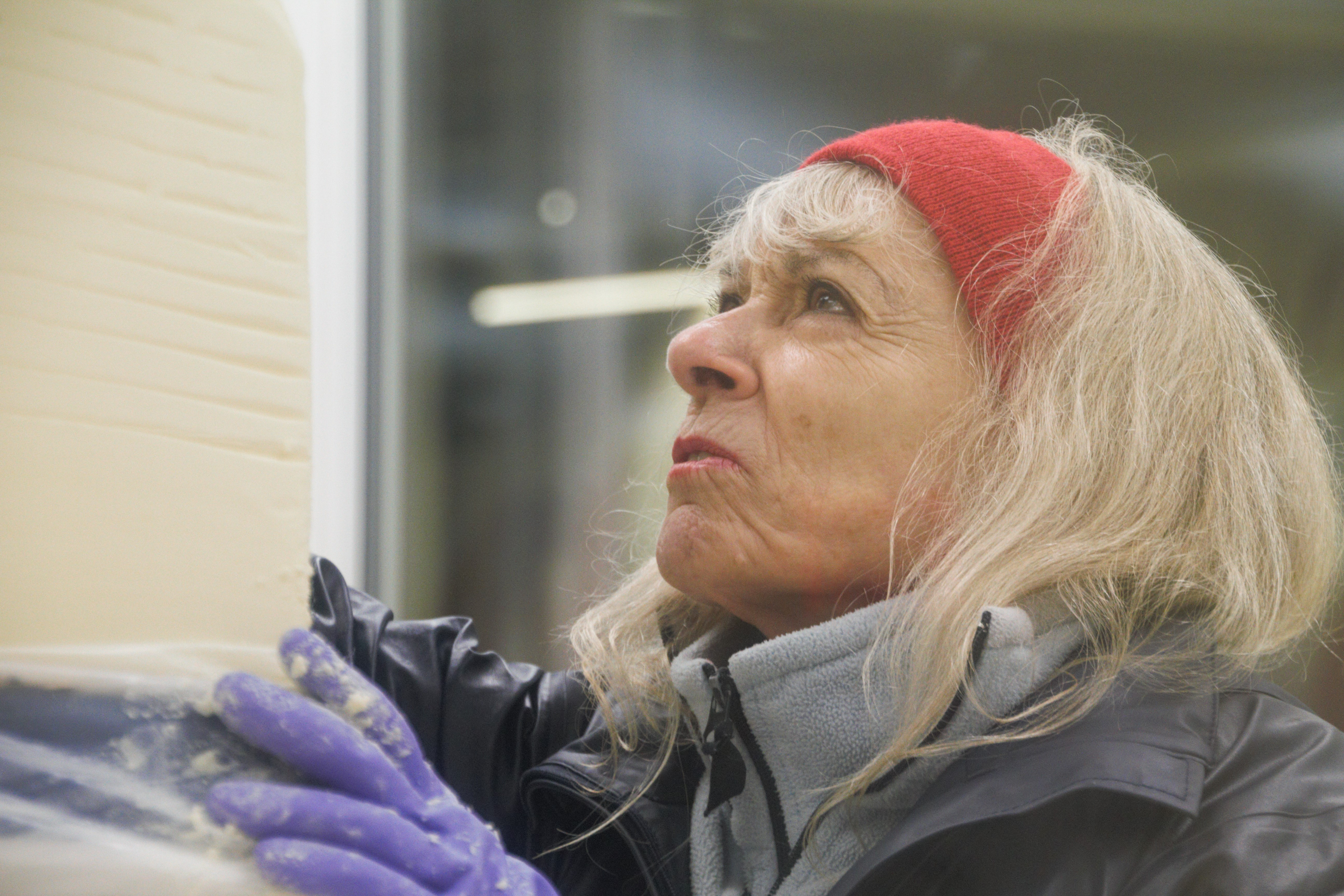
Linda Christensen prepares to sculpt another 90 pound block of butter as she stands in her refrigerated glass studio in the Dairy Building of the Minnesota State Fair (2018)

Linda Christensen (born c. 1942) is believed to be the only butter carver in the United States to work with live human models. She is known for sculpting the Minnesota State Fair's iconic butter sculptures for fifty years, ending her run after the 2021 fair. Christensen sculpted each of the top 12 finalists in the state's annual "Princess Kay of the Milky Way" competition out of 90-pound blocks of butter. Her work drew hundreds of thousands of visitors to the Dairy Building, where fair attendees could watch her carving. Each one took about six hours, during which the model joined Christensen in a rotating 40-degree butter booth, surrounded by viewers.

Christensen carved these sculptures out of Grade A salted butter provided by the Associated Milk Producers Inc. of New Ulm, Minnesota. By her 40th anniversary fair, it was estimated that she had carved more than 450 sculptures and 32,000 pounds of butter.

The butter sculpture event was initially started to highlight Minnesota's claim as the "butter capital of the nation", but the art of butter sculpting became a central part of the state's cultural identity. Christensen gained national recognition and sculpted public figures including David Letterman and Conan O'Brien, with O'Brien created with white chocolate bacon "hair". Another commission was to sculpt Big Bird from a 300-pound block of butter. National Geographic has twice featured her work. Because Christensen was unable to rush her carvings in just one hour, she had to turn down requests from Oprah Winfrey and Johnny Carson.

== Minnesota State Fair ==
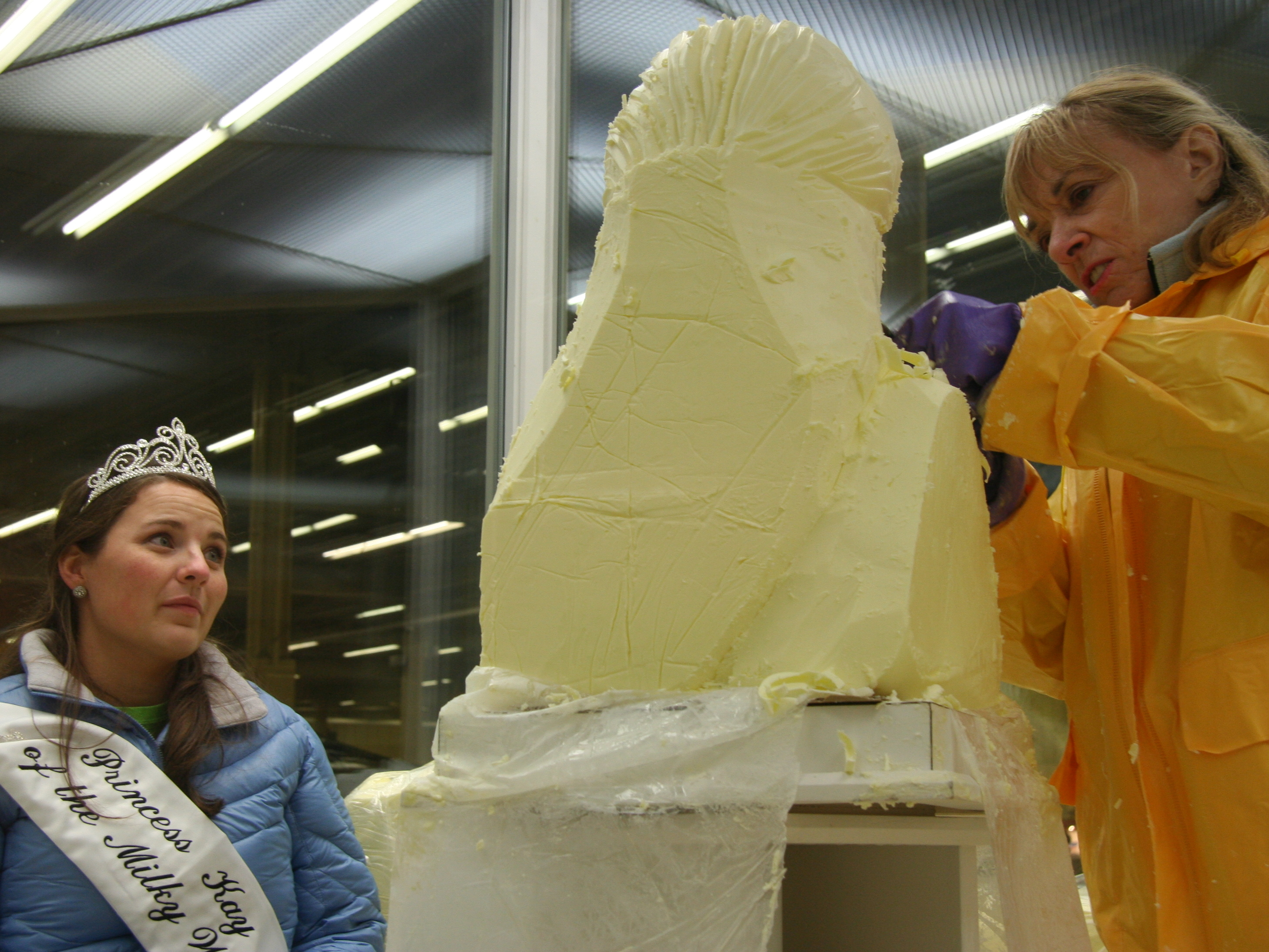
Linda Christensen (right) sculpting a live model in butter at the 2010 Minnesota State Fair

Running since 1859, the Minnesota State Fair is one of the largest fairs in the United States that is second only to Texas. It runs for 12 days starting sometime during the end of August and ends on Labor Day which is the first Monday of September. It takes place in Falcon Heights, Minnesota which borders the Twin Cities of Minneapolis and St. Paul. Christensen arrives just after dawn everyday at the state fairgrounds wearing long underwear, rubber gloves with a non-porous yellow rain coat over layers of clothing, and woolen socks with Crocs. Her routine is to walk the fairgrounds to get herself excited for the day. Starting between 9:00 a.m. and 9:30 a.m., Christensen spends most of her day at the State Fair with the dairy royalty in the 40-degree "butter booth," a rotating walk-in, glass-walled refrigerator. Depending on the princesses' hair, the carving of the butter sculpture takes six to eight hours per finalist. Christensen said that straight hair is easier than curly hair and short hair is easier than the long. She takes breaks after 90 minutes to warm up her hands, eat greasy fair food, and visit with fair goers. The most difficult part about each sculpture is getting the smile of the princess perfect. The rest of the sculpture she said in an interview with Minnesota Original comes naturally.

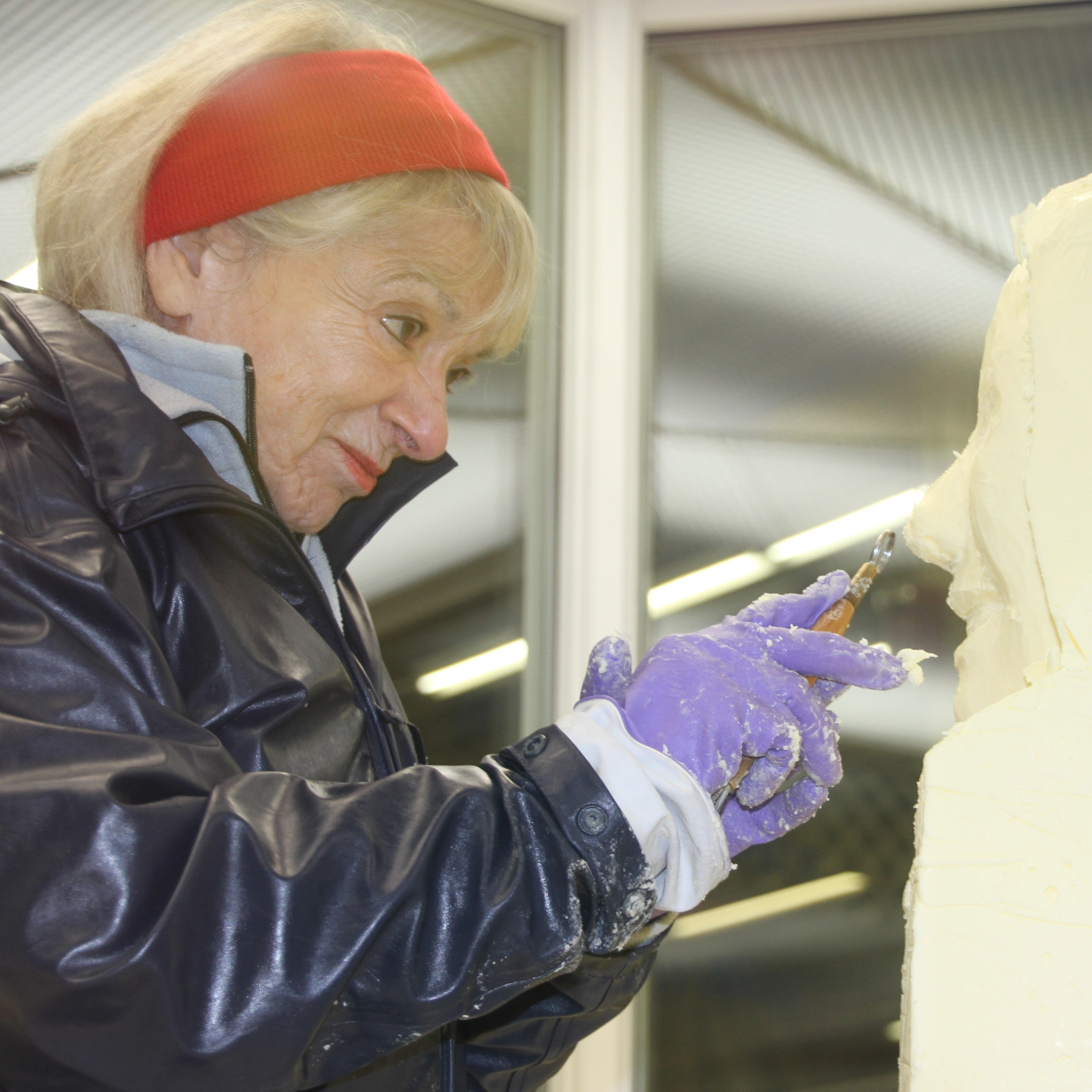
Christensen working at the Minnesota State Fair in 2017

The butter carving booth is one of the most popular exhibits at the state fair. The princess's family and friends stand around the rotating cooler as Christensen carves her sculpture. While she carves their faces, the princesses hold a microphone and answers question from the public about life on a dairy farm. In between interviews, Christensen talks to the princesses about boys, her children and her grandchildren. She likes working with butter as a medium because it's forgiving and can be "squished" into any form. It's also an attractive, eye-catching surface. She said the salted butter is much nicer to carve than the unsalted butter. Freezing the butter before carving leaves the image looking flaky. She uses a number of tools to mold and shape the butter, such as a long sharp floss-like cord, a number of knives and a 5-gallon pail to put the scraps in for the princesses to take home. She said in one of her interviews with The Wall Street Journal that this job was too big for a butter knife. She uses a similar style to Michelangelo who chipped away at his images. She plans to continue the butter sculpting at the Minnesota State Fair until she is no longer able to use her fingers. Christensen's legacy helped lead to the creation of the Butter-fy Yourself Facebook App in 2010. The app transforms a simple Facebook profile photo into one of six butter personalities, including a dairy princess, a butter hippie, a butter cow, a butter liberty, butter bouffant and butter up, a baseball player.

== Awards ==
To mark her 40th anniversary, the Midwest Dairy Association granted a $1,000 scholarship in Christensen's name to the Minneapolis College of Art and Design, to commemorate her dedication to carving butter heads. It was not until 2011 that Christensen went to a dairy farm. The 2007 Princess Kay of the Milky Way, Ann Miron Tauzell hosted a party on her father's farm in honor of Christensen's 40 years. Christensen toured the AMPI butter-producing operation in New Ulm, Minnesota, the state's largest butter factory, that hand packs the butter blocks she's used all those years. According to the Star Tribune, Christensen is considered a celebrity among the dairy industry. "Growing up on a dairy farm is not exactly glamorous," said Christa Mounts Schlosser, now a dairy inspector for the state. "It's smelly and dirty. But for one day when you're spinning in that booth with Linda, you're on a pedestal."

== Early life ==
In 1941 or 1942, Linda Olson was born in northeast Minneapolis, where her mother worked as a secretary and her father sold aluminum siding. She spent her youth in the area, as well as several years in Wilmar, Minnesota, where her father sold Wonder Bread. At 8 years old in 1950, Christensen first attended the Minnesota State Fair and hasn't missed one since. She graduated from Richfield High School in 1960 after spending months of her senior year in the hospital. She later went on to marry Earl Christensen and have two daughters before becoming one of the first married mothers to attend the Minneapolis College of Art and Design, where she earned a degree in visual arts with a concentration in sculpture. In 1968, while she was an art student, Christensen witnessed an artist at the State Fair sculpting butter heads as dairy princesses modeled, and she wished she could join them in the cooler.

The original sculptor moved away and left the role open in the upcoming 1972 fair. Christensen was recommended by a person at her college 1972, and was hired after her audition, in which she was given three hours with a 55-pound butter block.

== Life in the off season ==
Christensen held several jobs over the next decades as she returned annually to the fair each summer for butter sculpting. She was a middle-school art teacher in the Twin Cities, a General Mills employee, and later ran her own studio and store in Danbury, Wisconsin, selling ceramic wildlife sculptures. She and Earl divorced in 1985, and she continued creating work including "Elderberries", a humorous greeting card line about aging. In 2000, Christensen earned a master's degree in theology from the University of St. Catherine in St. Paul.

At various points she taught calligraphy, sculpture and drawing. She took classes in poetry from the Loft Literary Center and became certified as a Zumba fitness instructor, with additional kinesiology classes that allowed her to teach specialized classes for aging participants. Christensen eventually left the upper Midwest for Oceanside, California, where she became employed as a wine advisor and sold necklaces crafted from hand-tooled leather.
