= Fox Lake (Florida) =

Lake in the state of Florida, United States

- Location within Florida Location within the United States
- Location: Highlands County, Florida, east of Avon Park, Florida
- Coordinates: 27°36′29″N 81°28′00″W
- Lake type: natural freshwater lake
- Basin countries: United States
- Max. length: 1,175 ft (358 m)
- Max. width: 940 ft (290 m)
- Surface area: 22.5 acres (9 ha)
- Surface elevation: 92 ft (28 m)

Fox Lake is a small natural freshwater lake in northern Highlands County, Florida. It has an oblong shape and has a surface area of 22.5-acre (91,000 m^{2}). It is a short distance east of Deer Lake and Luck Lake. Fox Lake is bordered by houses and Fox Lake Road on the west and on the north, east and south by citrus groves. It is surrounded by private property, but two narrow public easements exist that legally allow access to it.
