= Welcome, Minnesota =

City in Minnesota, United States

- City
- Location in Martin County and the state of Minnesota
- Coordinates: 43°40′02″N 94°37′08″W
- Country: United States
- State: Minnesota
- County: Martin
- Established: 1890

Government
  - City Council: Mayor Dan Schmidtke

Area
  - Total: 1.46 sq mi (3.77 km^{2})
  - Land: 1.46 sq mi (3.77 km^{2})
  - Water: 0 sq mi (0.00 km^{2})
- Elevation: 1,230 ft (370 m)

Population (2020)
  - Total: 710
  - Density: 487.8/sq mi (188.33/km^{2})
- Time zone: UTC-6 (Central (CST))
  - Summer (DST): UTC-5 (CDT)
- ZIP code: 56181
- Area code: 507
- FIPS code: 27-69070
- GNIS feature ID: 2397244
- Website: welcomemn.govoffice2.com

Welcome is a city in Martin County, Minnesota, United States. The population was 710 at the 2020 census.

== History ==
While a post office called "Welcome" has been in operation since 1881, the city was not incorporated until 1890. Welcome was incorporated, first as a village, on May 7, 1890, and named after homesteader Alfred M. Welcome, who owned a farm on what became the city's southwest side.

A local newspaper, The Welcome Times, circulated in town from 1895 through 1969 before being merged with the Sherburn Advance-Standard.

In 1988, Welcome combined with nearby Sherburn and Trimont schools to form the Martin County West School District. In 1999, Welcome combined its police department with nearby Sherburn to form the joint Sherburn/Welcome Police Department.

== Geography ==
Welcome is in central Martin County, between Fairmont, the county seat 8 miles (13 km) to the east, and Sherburn 6 miles (10 km) to the west. 120th Street, former U.S. Route 16, passes along the southern edge of Welcome and connects it with the two other cities. Interstate 90, also traveling east-west, passes just north of Welcome, with access from Exit 93. Minnesota State Highway 263 passes through the east side of Welcome as Guide Street, leading south 10 miles (16 km) to Ceylon.

According to the U.S. Census Bureau, Welcome has a total area of 1.46 square miles (3.78 km^{2}), all land. The original description of the site was "Section 1, Township 102, Range 32".

== Demographics ==
Historical population
Census	Pop.	Note	%±
1890	140		—
1900	549		292.1%
1910	543		−1.1%
1920	612		12.7%
1930	519		−15.2%
1940	630		21.4%
1950	712		13.0%
1960	733		2.9%
1970	694		−5.3%
1980	855		23.2%
1990	790		−7.6%
2000	721		−8.7%
2010	686		−4.9%
2020	710		3.5%
U.S. Decennial Census

=== 2010 census ===
As of the census of 2010, there were 686 people, 310 households, and 193 families living in the city. The population density was 466.7 inhabitants per square mile (180.2/km^{2}). There were 341 housing units at an average density of 232.0 per square mile (89.6/km^{2}). The racial makeup of the city was 99.9% White and 0.1% African American. Hispanic or Latino of any race were 2.9% of the population.

There were 310 households, of which 23.9% had children under the age of 18 living with them, 47.4% were married couples living together, 9.0% had a female householder with no husband present, 5.8% had a male householder with no wife present, and 37.7% were non-families. 32.6% of all households were made up of individuals, and 14.8% had someone living alone who was 65 years of age or older. The average household size was 2.21 and the average family size was 2.77.

The median age in the city was 44.3 years. 22% of residents were under the age of 18; 7% were between the ages of 18 and 24; 21.7% were from 25 to 44; 31% were from 45 to 64; and 18.4% were 65 years of age or older. The gender makeup of the city was 49.7% male and 50.3% female.

=== 2000 census ===
As of the census of 2000, there were 721 people, 310 households, and 200 families living in the city. The population density was 792.4 inhabitants per square mile (305.9/km^{2}). There were 347 housing units at an average density of 381.3 per square mile (147.2/km^{2}). The racial makeup of the city was 99.17% White, 0.14% from other races, and 0.69% from two or more races. Hispanic or Latino of any race were 0.97% of the population.

There were 310 households, out of which 28.7% had children under the age of 18 living with them, 54.8% were married couples living together, 6.5% had a female householder with no husband present, and 35.2% were non-families. 31.0% of all households were made up of individuals, and 16.1% had someone living alone who was 65 years of age or older. The average household size was 2.33 and the average family size was 2.90.

In the city, the population was spread out, with 25.4% under the age of 18, 6.2% from 18 to 24, 24.5% from 25 to 44, 24.1% from 45 to 64, and 19.7% who were 65 years of age or older. The median age was 41 years. For every 100 females, there were 107.2 males. For every 100 females age 18 and over, there were 99.3 males.

The median income for a household in the city was $32,125, and the median income for a family was $38,438. Males had a median income of $30,875 versus $20,536 for females. The per capita income for the city was $16,539. About 3.9% of families and 6.9% of the population were below the poverty line, including 7.4% of those under age 18 and 6.7% of those age 65 or over.
