= Nashville Center, Minnesota =

- Unincorporated community
- Location within Minnesota Location within the United States
- Coordinates: 43°50′03″N 94°18′28″W
- Country: United States
- State: Minnesota
- County: Martin
- Township: Nashville
- Elevation: 1,083 ft (330 m)
- Time zone: UTC-6 (Central (CST))
  - Summer (DST): UTC-5 (CDT)
- Area code: 507
- GNIS feature ID: 654842

Nashville Center is an unincorporated community in Nashville Township, Martin County, Minnesota, United States.
