= Rutland Township, Martin County, Minnesota =

Rutland Township, Minnesota
- Township
- Location within the state of Minnesota Rutland Township, Minnesota (the United States)
- Coordinates: 43°42′51″N 94°26′32″W
- Country: United States
- State: Minnesota
- County: Martin

Area
  - Total: 36.9 sq mi (95.7 km^{2})
  - Land: 35.5 sq mi (92.0 km^{2})
  - Water: 1.4 sq mi (3.7 km^{2})
- Elevation: 1,150 ft (350 m)

Population (2000)
  - Total: 472
  - Density: 13/sq mi (5.1/km^{2})
- Time zone: UTC-6 (Central (CST))
  - Summer (DST): UTC-5 (CDT)
- FIPS code: 27-56500
- GNIS feature ID: 0665495

Rutland Township is a township in Martin County, Minnesota, United States. The population was 472 at the 2000 census.

Rutland Township was named after Rutland, Vermont.

== Geography ==
According to the United States Census Bureau, the township has a total area of 37.0 square miles (95.7 km^{2}), of which 35.5 square miles (92.0 km^{2}) is land and 1.4 square miles (3.7 km^{2}) (3.82%) is water.

== Demographics ==
As of the census of 2000, there were 472 people, 162 households, and 138 families residing in the township. The population density was 13.3 people per square mile (5.1/km^{2}). There were 169 housing units at an average density of 4.8/sq mi (1.8/km^{2}). The racial makeup of the township was 97.46% White, 0.21% African American, 2.12% from other races, and 0.21% from two or more races. Hispanic or Latino of any race were 3.81% of the population.

There were 162 households, out of which 37.0% had children under the age of 18 living with them, 77.2% were married couples living together, 3.7% had a female householder with no husband present, and 14.8% were non-families. 11.7% of all households were made up of individuals, and 4.9% had someone living alone who was 65 years of age or older. The average household size was 2.79 and the average family size was 2.99.

In the township the population was spread out, with 26.3% under the age of 18, 6.4% from 18 to 24, 30.5% from 25 to 44, 24.6% from 45 to 64, and 12.3% who were 65 years of age or older. The median age was 37 years. For every 100 females, there were 122.6 males. For every 100 females age 18 and over, there were 118.9 males.

The median income for a household in the township was $41,786, and the median income for a family was $42,969. Males had a median income of $27,019 versus $20,625 for females. The per capita income for the township was $16,757. About 2.9% of families and 9.0% of the population were below the poverty line, including 5.9% of those under age 18 and none of those age 65 or over.
