= Waverly Township, Martin County, Minnesota =

Waverly Township, Minnesota
- Township
- Location within the state of Minnesota Waverly Township, Minnesota (the United States)
- Coordinates: 43°48′5″N 94°33′0″W
- Country: United States
- State: Minnesota
- County: Martin

Area
  - Total: 36.8 sq mi (95.3 km^{2})
  - Land: 36.6 sq mi (94.9 km^{2})
  - Water: 0.15 sq mi (0.4 km^{2})
- Elevation: 1,152 ft (351 m)

Population (2000)
  - Total: 245
  - Density: 6.7/sq mi (2.6/km^{2})
- Time zone: UTC-6 (Central (CST))
  - Summer (DST): UTC-5 (CDT)
- FIPS code: 27-68746
- GNIS feature ID: 0665940

Waverly Township is a township in Martin County, Minnesota, United States. The population was 245 at the 2000 census.

Waverly Township was named after Waverly, New York.

== Geography ==
According to the United States Census Bureau, the township has a total area of 36.8 square miles (95.3 km^{2}), of which 36.6 square miles (94.9 km^{2}) is land and 0.2 square mile (0.4 km^{2}) (0.43%) is water.

== Demographics ==
As of the census of 2000, there were 245 people, 89 households, and 77 families residing in the township. The population density was 6.7 people per square mile (2.6 people/km^{2}). There were 97 housing units at an average density of 2.6 per square mile (1.0/km^{2}). The racial makeup of the township was 99.59% White, and 0.41% from two or more races.

There were 89 households, out of which 34.8% had children under the age of 18 living with them, 78.7% were married couples living together, 2.2% had a female householder with no husband present, and 12.4% were non-families. 11.2% of all households were made up of individuals, and 4.5% had someone living alone who was 65 years of age or older. The average household size was 2.75 and the average family size was 2.94.

In the township the population was spread out, with 25.7% under the age of 18, 8.2% from 18 to 24, 23.7% from 25 to 44, 27.3% from 45 to 64, and 15.1% who were 65 years of age or older. The median age was 41 years. For every 100 females, there were 105.9 males. For every 100 females age 18 and over, there were 109.2 males.

The median income for a household in the township was $46,875, and the median income for a family was $41,750. Males had a median income of $29,375 versus $21,250 for females. The per capita income for the township was $16,161. About 12.3% of families and 13.9% of the population were below the poverty line, including 20.3% of those under the age of eighteen and none of those 65 or over.
