= Fairmont Township, Martin County, Minnesota =

Fairmont Township, Minnesota
- Township
- Location within the state of Minnesota Fairmont Township, Minnesota (the United States)
- Coordinates: 43°36′59″N 94°23′56″W
- Country: United States
- State: Minnesota
- County: Martin

Area
  - Total: 21.9 sq mi (56.7 km^{2})
  - Land: 20.6 sq mi (53.4 km^{2})
  - Water: 1.3 sq mi (3.3 km^{2})
- Elevation: 1,178 ft (359 m)

Population (2000)
  - Total: 298
  - Density: 15/sq mi (5.6/km^{2})
- Time zone: UTC-6 (Central (CST))
  - Summer (DST): UTC-5 (CDT)
- ZIP codes: 56031, 56075
- Area code: 507
- FIPS code: 27-20348
- GNIS feature ID: 0664134

Fairmont Township is a township in Martin County, Minnesota, United States. The population was 298 at the 2000 census.

Fairmont Township took its name from Fairmont.

== Geography ==
According to the United States Census Bureau, the township has a total area of 21.9 square miles (57 km^{2}), of which 20.6 square miles (53 km^{2}) is land and 1.3 square miles (3.4 km^{2}) (5.85%) is water.

== Demographics ==
As of the census of 2000, there were 298 people, 107 households, and 86 families residing in the township. The population density was 14.5 inhabitants per square mile (5.6/km^{2}). There were 116 housing units at an average density of 5.6 per square mile (2.2/km^{2}). The racial makeup of the township was 98.99% White, 0.34% from other races, and 0.67% from two or more races. Hispanic or Latino of any race were 1.68% of the population.

There were 107 households, out of which 42.1% had children under the age of 18 living with them, 75.7% were married couples living together, and 19.6% were non-families. 18.7% of all households were made up of individuals, and 7.5% had someone living alone who was 65 years of age or older. The average household size was 2.79 and the average family size was 3.15.

In the township the population was spread out, with 28.2% under the age of 18, 7.0% from 18 to 24, 23.2% from 25 to 44, 31.2% from 45 to 64, and 10.4% who were 65 years of age or older. The median age was 41 years. For every 100 females, there were 111.3 males. For every 100 females age 18 and over, there were 116.2 males.

The median income for a household in the township was $51,250, and the median income for a family was $56,042. Males had a median income of $33,750 versus $22,250 for females. The per capita income for the township was $19,656. About 3.5% of families and 5.2% of the population were below the poverty line, including 7.6% of those under the age of eighteen and none of those 65 or over.
