= Ceylon, Minnesota =

City in Minnesota, United States

- City
- Ceylon United Methodist Church

- Location in Martin County and the state of Minnesota
- Coordinates: 43°31′58″N 94°37′51″W
- Country: United States
- State: Minnesota
- County: Martin

Government
  - Mayor: John Gibeau

Area
  - Total: 0.52 sq mi (1.34 km^{2})
  - Land: 0.52 sq mi (1.34 km^{2})
  - Water: 0 sq mi (0.00 km^{2})
- Elevation: 1,266 ft (386 m)

Population (2020)
  - Total: 303
  - Density: 586.3/sq mi (226.39/km^{2})
- Time zone: UTC-6 (Central (CST))
  - Summer (DST): UTC-5 (CDT)
- ZIP code: 56121
- Area code: 507
- FIPS code: 27-10792
- GNIS feature ID: 2393792
- Website: cityofceylon.com

Ceylon (/ˈseɪlɒn/ SAY-lon) is a city in Martin County, Minnesota, United States. The population was 303 at the 2020 census, down from 369 in 2010.

== History ==
Ceylon was platted in 1899. It was named after the island of Ceylon, which was then a British colony, and is now the nation of Sri Lanka. A post office has been in operation in Ceylon since 1899. The name "Chanhassen" was already in use, so a group of men sitting in Tom Sahr's general store suggested "Ceylon", for the boxes of Ceylon tea in the store.

== Geography ==
Ceylon is in southwestern Martin County, 2 miles (3 km) north of the Iowa state line. It is 10 miles (16 km) south of Welcome and 16 miles (26 km) southwest of Fairmont, the Martin county seat. Ceylon is served by Minnesota State Highway 263.

According to the U.S. Census Bureau, the city has a total area of 0.52 square miles (1.35 km^{2}), all land. Clear Lake is just outside the city limits to the southwest.

== Demographics ==
Historical population
Census	Pop.	Note	%±
1910	330		—
1920	543		64.5%
1930	475		−12.5%
1940	549		15.6%
1950	618		12.6%
1960	554		−10.4%
1970	487		−12.1%
1980	543		11.5%
1990	461		−15.1%
2000	413		−10.4%
2010	369		−10.7%
2020	303		−17.9%
U.S. Decennial Census

=== 2010 census ===
As of the census of 2010, there were 369 people, 153 households, and 100 families living in the city. The population density was 567.7 inhabitants per square mile (219.2/km^{2}). There were 183 housing units at an average density of 281.5 per square mile (108.7/km^{2}). The racial makeup of the city was 97.0% White, 0.3% Native American, 1.6% from other races, and 1.1% from two or more races. Hispanic or Latino of any race were 4.9% of the population.

There were 153 households, of which 30.1% had children under the age of 18 living with them, 54.9% were married couples living together, 7.2% had a female householder with no husband present, 3.3% had a male householder with no wife present, and 34.6% were non-families. 27.5% of all households were made up of individuals, and 13% had someone living alone who was 65 years of age or older. The average household size was 2.41 and the average family size was 2.98.

The median age in the city was 42.1 years. 25.7% of residents were under the age of 18; 4.8% were between the ages of 18 and 24; 21.5% were from 25 to 44; 30.6% were from 45 to 64; and 17.3% were 65 years of age or older. The gender makeup of the city was 52.3% male and 47.7% female.

=== 2000 census ===
As of the census of 2000, there were 413 people, 175 households, and 121 families living in the city. The population density was 635.8 inhabitants per square mile (245.5/km^{2}). There were 189 housing units at an average density of 291.0 per square mile (112.4/km^{2}). The racial makeup of the city was 98.55% White, 0.24% Pacific Islander, and 1.21% from two or more races. Hispanic or Latino of any race were 2.18% of the population.

There were 175 households, out of which 28.0% had children under the age of 18 living with them, 59.4% were married couples living together, 6.3% had a female householder with no husband present, and 30.3% were non-families. 24.6% of all households were made up of individuals, and 11.4% had someone living alone who was 65 years of age or older. The average household size was 2.36 and the average family size was 2.80.

In the city, the population was spread out, with 24.2% under the age of 18, 7.3% from 18 to 24, 22.5% from 25 to 44, 24.7% from 45 to 64, and 21.3% who were 65 years of age or older. The median age was 41 years. For every 100 females, there were 105.5 males. For every 100 females age 18 and over, there were 101.9 males.

The median income for a household in the city was $31,100, and the median income for a family was $32,708. Males had a median income of $23,889 versus $23,125 for females. The per capita income for the city was $15,607. About 9.6% of families and 17.6% of the population were below the poverty line, including 42.9% of those under age 18 and 13.3% of those age 65 or over.

== Notable people ==
- Walter Mondale (1928–2021), Vice President of the United States, United States senator, United States Ambassador to Japan, Minnesota attorney general, and presidential nominee; born in Ceylon
- Bob Waltman (1933–2010), Minnesota state legislator; born in Ceylon
