= Center Creek Township, Martin County, Minnesota =

Center Creek Township, Minnesota
- Township
- Location within the state of Minnesota Center Creek Township, Minnesota (the United States)
- Coordinates: 43°42′14″N 94°18′56″W
- Country: United States
- State: Minnesota
- County: Martin

Area
  - Total: 35.5 sq mi (91.9 km^{2})
  - Land: 35.4 sq mi (91.8 km^{2})
  - Water: 0.039 sq mi (0.1 km^{2})
- Elevation: 1,106 ft (337 m)

Population (2000)
  - Total: 269
  - Density: 7.5/sq mi (2.9/km^{2})
- Time zone: UTC-6 (Central (CST))
  - Summer (DST): UTC-5 (CDT)
- FIPS code: 27-10594
- GNIS feature ID: 0663773

Center Creek Township is a township in Martin County, Minnesota, United States. The population was 269 at the 2000 census.

This township took its name from Center Creek.

== Geography ==
According to the United States Census Bureau, the township has a total area of 35.5 square miles (92 km^{2}), of which 35.5 square miles (92 km^{2}) is land and 0.04 square miles (0.10 km^{2}) (0.08%) is water.

== Demographics ==
As of the census of 2000, there were 269 people, 106 households, and 78 families residing in the township. The population density was 7.6 inhabitants per square mile (2.9/km^{2}). There were 111 housing units at an average density of 3.1 per square mile (1.2/km^{2}). The racial makeup of the township was 98.51% White, and 1.49% from two or more races. Hispanic or Latino of any race were 1.86% of the population.

There were 106 households, out of which 26.4% had children under the age of 18 living with them, 64.2% were married couples living together, 3.8% had a female householder with no husband present, and 26.4% were non-families. 20.8% of all households were made up of individuals, and 8.5% had someone living alone who was 65 years of age or older. The average household size was 2.54 and the average family size was 2.88.

In the township the population was spread out, with 23.0% under the age of 18, 8.6% from 18 to 24, 25.3% from 25 to 44, 27.1% from 45 to 64, and 16.0% who were 65 years of age or older. The median age was 42 years. For every 100 females, there were 100.7 males. For every 100 females age 18 and over, there were 105.0 males.

The median income for a household in the township was $40,859, and the median income for a family was $41,477. Males had a median income of $26,389 versus $18,750 for females. The per capita income for the township was $16,689. About 2.6% of families and 3.6% of the population were below the poverty line, including none of those under the age of eighteen and 5.6% of those 65 or over.
