= Westford Township, Martin County, Minnesota =

Township in Minnesota, United States

Westford Township, Minnesota
- Township
- Location within the state of Minnesota Westford Township, Minnesota (the United States)
- Coordinates: 43°48′39″N 94°26′1″W
- Country: United States
- State: Minnesota
- County: Martin

Area
  - Total: 36.6 sq mi (94.8 km^{2})
  - Land: 36.2 sq mi (93.8 km^{2})
  - Water: 0.35 sq mi (0.9 km^{2})
- Elevation: 1,138 ft (347 m)

Population (2000)
  - Total: 331
  - Density: 9.1/sq mi (3.5/km^{2})
- Time zone: UTC-6 (Central (CST))
  - Summer (DST): UTC-5 (CDT)
- FIPS code: 27-69466
- GNIS feature ID: 0665964

Westford Township is a township in Martin County, Minnesota, United States. The population was 331 at the 2000 census.

== Geography ==
According to the United States Census Bureau, the township has a total area of 36.6 square miles (94.8 km^{2}), of which 36.2 square miles (93.8 km^{2}) is land and 0.4 square mile (1.0 km^{2}) (1.01%) is water.

== Demographics ==
As of the census of 2000, there were 331 people, 122 households, and 97 families residing in the township. The population density was 9.1 people per square mile (3.5 people/km^{2}). There were 127 housing units at an average density of 3.5 per square mile (1.4/km^{2}). The racial makeup of the township was 99.40% White, 0.30% Asian, and 0.30% from two or more races. Hispanic or Latino of any race were 0.91% of the population.

There were 122 households, out of which 36.1% had children under the age of 18 living with them, 73.8% were married couples living together, 3.3% had a female householder with no husband present, and 19.7% were non-families. 17.2% of all households were made up of individuals, and 10.7% had someone living alone who was 65 years of age or older. The average household size was 2.71 and the average family size was 3.06.

In the township the population was spread out, with 27.8% under the age of 18, 7.9% from 18 to 24, 23.9% from 25 to 44, 28.4% from 45 to 64, and 12.1% who were 65 years of age or older. The median age was 41 years. For every 100 females, there were 94.7 males. For every 100 females age 18 and over, there were 99.2 males.

The median income for a typical household in the township was $45,833, and the median income for a family was $54,063. Males had a median income of $31,806 versus $20,625 for females. The per capita income for the township was $16,963. About 4.5% of families and 7.3% of the population were below the poverty line, including 12.9% of those under age 18 and 10.3% of those age 65 or over.
