= Luck Lake =

Lake in the state of Florida, United States

- Lake Duck
- Location within Florida
- Location: Highlands County, Florida
- Coordinates: 27°36′48″N 81°28′43″W
- Type: lake
- Surface area: 2.15 acres (0.87 ha)

Luck Lake is a small freshwater lake in northern Highlands County, Florida. Just to the southeast is Deer Lake. Luck Lake is apparently a natural lake, but it has been dredged and altered to resemble a horseshoe. The Florida Atlas of Lakes says its surface area is 2.15 acres (0.87 ha). It is a very shallow lake; parts of its bottom were exposed during a severe drought lasting from 2006 to 2009. This lake is also known as Lake Duck on at least one map and on the Lakes of Highlands County website.

Luck Lake is owned by Orange Blossom Fellowship, which has a church on the site, on the east side of County Road 17A. Most of the organization's land is occupied by a mobile home/RV park. Luck Lake contains a fountain in its southeast corner. Because of its small size, no boating is possible. There are five fishing docks on site, but they are not open to the public. Swimming is also prohibited.
