= Lake Belt Township, Martin County, Minnesota =

Lake Belt Township, Minnesota
- Township
- Location within the state of Minnesota Lake Belt Township, Minnesota (the United States)
- Coordinates: 43°32′43″N 94°39′51″W
- Country: United States
- State: Minnesota
- County: Martin

Area
  - Total: 35.5 sq mi (91.9 km^{2})
  - Land: 34.5 sq mi (89.3 km^{2})
  - Water: 1.0 sq mi (2.6 km^{2})
- Elevation: 1,240 ft (378 m)

Population (2000)
  - Total: 237
  - Density: 7.0/sq mi (2.7/km^{2})
- Time zone: UTC-6 (Central (CST))
  - Summer (DST): UTC-5 (CDT)
- FIPS code: 27-34082
- GNIS feature ID: 0664662

Lake Belt Township is a township in Martin County, Minnesota, United States. The population was 237 at the 2000 census.

Lake Belt Township was organized in 1867.

== Geography ==
According to the United States Census Bureau, the township has a total area of 35.5 square miles (92 km^{2}), of which 34.5 square miles (89 km^{2}) is land and 1.0 square mile (2.6 km^{2}) (2.79%) is water.

== Demographics ==
As of the census of 2000, there were 237 people, 97 households, and 67 families residing in the township. The population density was 6.9 inhabitants per square mile (2.7/km^{2}). There were 104 housing units at an average density of 3.0 per square mile (1.2/km^{2}). The racial makeup of the township was 97.47% White, 0.42% Asian, 2.11% from other races. Hispanic or Latino of any race were 2.11% of the population.

There were 97 households, out of which 30.9% had children under the age of 18 living with them, 62.9% were married couples living together, 3.1% had a female householder with no husband present, and 30.9% were non-families. 28.9% of all households were made up of individuals, and 11.3% had someone living alone who was 65 years of age or older. The average household size was 2.44 and the average family size was 3.03.

In the township the population was spread out, with 28.3% under the age of 18, 2.5% from 18 to 24, 28.7% from 25 to 44, 20.7% from 45 to 64, and 19.8% who were 65 years of age or older. The median age was 40 years. For every 100 females, there were 109.7 males. For every 100 females age 18 and over, there were 107.3 males.

The median income for a household in the township was $31,563, and the median income for a family was $35,250. Males had a median income of $24,219 versus $25,417 for females. The per capita income for the township was $11,866. About 6.3% of families and 7.7% of the population were below the poverty line, including 6.0% of those under the age of eighteen and 11.8% of those 65 or over.
