= Lake Fox =

- Location within Florida
- Location: Winter Haven, Florida
- Coordinates: 27.9861°N 81.6559°W
- Type: natural freshwater lake
- Basin countries: United States
- Max. length: 1,750 feet (530 m)
- Max. width: 1,750 feet (530 m)
- Surface area: 54.47 acres (22 ha)
- Surface elevation: 135 feet (41 m)
- Islands: No real islands, just a number of floating islands consisting of swamplike vegetation

Lake Fox is a lake in Polk County, Florida. It is basically a round lake, although it has a few shoreline irregularities. Lake Fox is a natural freshwater lake with an 54.47-acre (220,400 m^{2}) surface area. This lake is completely surrounded by residential areas, which are mostly single-family homes. The exception is on Lake Fox's northwest side, where it is bordered by Lake Fox Village, a mobile-home community.

There is no public access to Lake Fox, as its shores nowhere border public property. It has only private boat docks and no swimming areas. One boat ramp off East Lake Fox Drive is for the use of the residents in that area. Although there is nowhere for the fishing public to access the lake, the Hook and Bullet website says Lake Fox contains largemouth bass, bluegill and crappie.
