= Fox Sagar Lake =

- Location within Hyderabad
- Location: Hyderabad
- Coordinates: 17.524°N 78.470°E
- Type: Reservoir
- Primary inflows: Musi
- Primary outflows: Musi
- Basin countries: India
- Built: 1897
- Surface area: 2 square kilometres (490 acres)
- Max. depth: 33 feet (10 m)
- Frozen: Never
- Islands: None

Fox Sagar Lake is a manmade lake. It is the largest waterbody in Secunderabad. It was once spread over an area of 290 acres (1.2 km^{2}). As of 2014, due to encroachment, it only occupied a surface area of 126 acres (0.51 km^{2}). The lake which is located Jeedimetla near Kompally was built in 1897 by Mahbub Ali Khan, Asaf Jah VI and as per some sources the lake occupies a surface area of 2 square kilometres (490 acres) and some sources claim that it is the second biggest lake in Hyderabad and was a popular spot for picnics. About 1014 illegal structures which have encroached the lake were identified by Telangana Irrigation Department in a report submitted to the National Green Tribunal in November 2022 and this makes Fox Sagar Lake as the third most encroached lake in Hyderabad.

== History ==
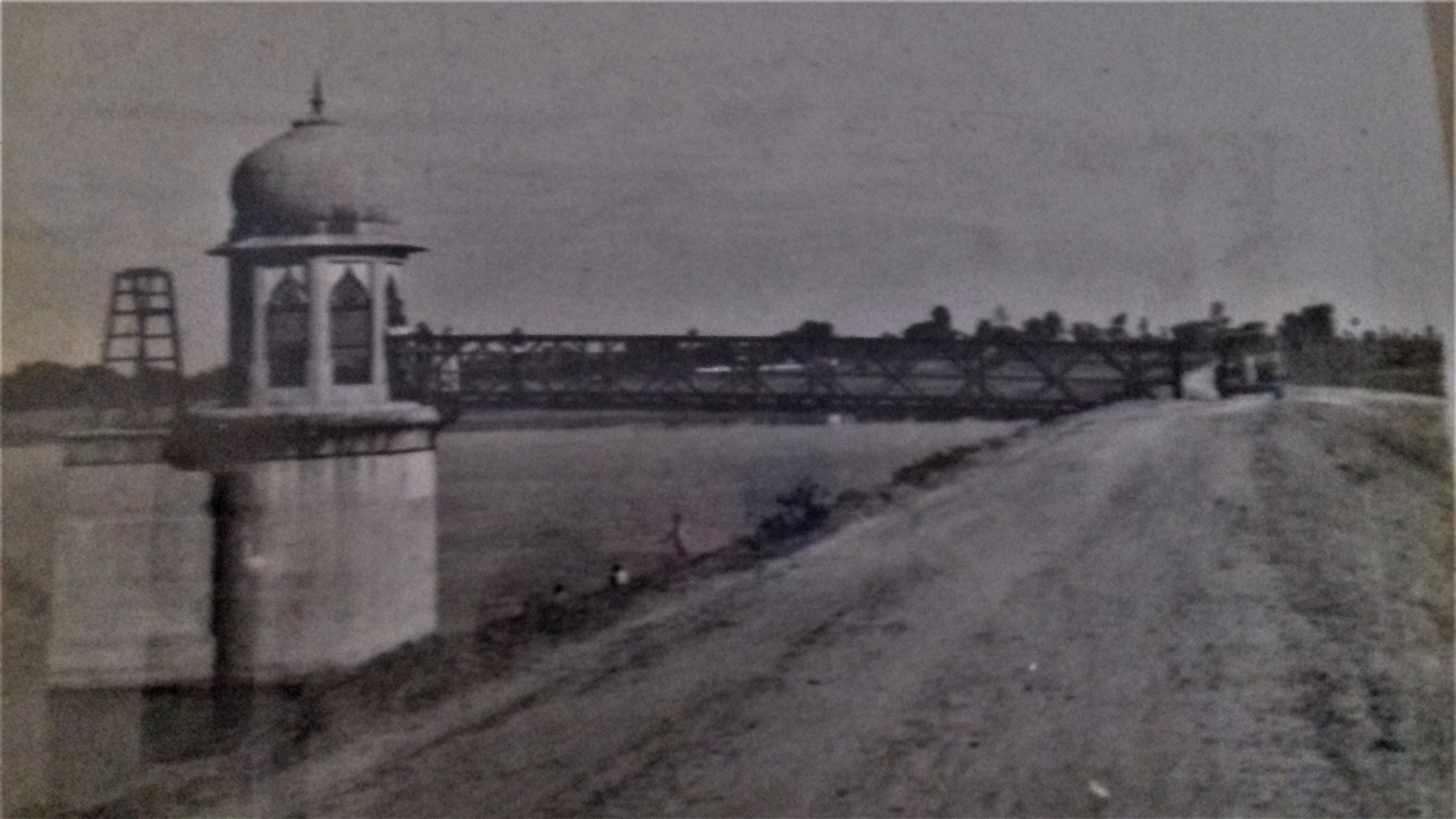
View of Fox Sagar Lake and its pump house in 1897

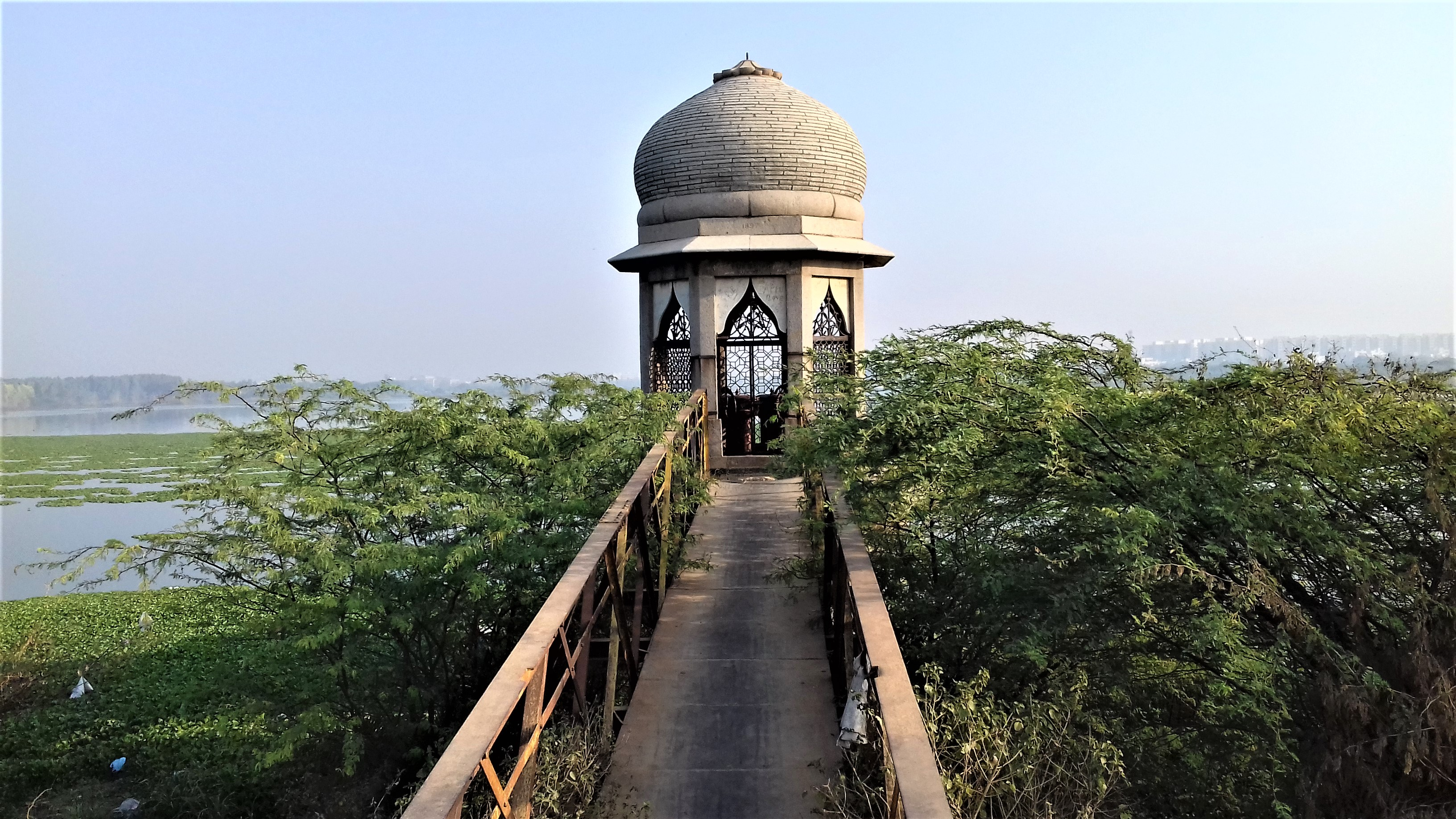
The pump house at Fox Sagar Lake

The lake was built in 1897 and was a major source of drinking water to residents of Secunderabad. The lake was built before the construction of Osman Sagar and Himayat Sagar, were built in the Musi river. This lake was once linked to Hussain Sagar by a tributary of Musi river.

== Description ==
The lake is spread over an area of 2 km^{2}. A stone structure built as pump house is still existing on the lake shore. However, the steel structures have rusted. As per some sources, the lake water was used for irrigation till few decades ago and the lake was also used for fishing. Today the water is unfit for consumption due to heavy pollution and its surface area has reduced to one third of its original size due to illegal encroachments by real estate developers. Fox Sagar lake is supposed to be the second most polluted lake in Hyderabad. Some efforts have been initiated by government agencies and volunteers to rejuvenate and clean Fox Sagar lake.
