= Cedar Township, Martin County, Minnesota =

Township in Martin County, Minnesota, US

Cedar Township, Minnesota
- Township
- Location within the state of Minnesota Cedar Township, Minnesota (the United States)
- Coordinates: 43°48′4″N 94°47′1″W
- Country: United States
- State: Minnesota
- County: Martin

Area
  - Total: 35.8 sq mi (92.7 km^{2})
  - Land: 34.5 sq mi (89.4 km^{2})
  - Water: 1.2 sq mi (3.2 km^{2})
- Elevation: 1,240 ft (378 m)

Population (2000)
  - Total: 260
  - Density: 7.5/sq mi (2.9/km^{2})
- Time zone: UTC-6 (Central (CST))
  - Summer (DST): UTC-5 (CDT)
- FIPS code: 27-10378
- GNIS feature ID: 0663765

Cedar Township is a township in Martin County, Minnesota, United States. The population was 260 at the 2000 census.

Cedar Township was organized in 1872, and named for Cedar Lake.

== Geography ==
According to the United States Census Bureau, the township has a total area of 35.8 square miles (93 km^{2}), of which 34.5 square miles (89 km^{2}) is land and 1.2 square miles (3.1 km^{2}) (3.49%) is water.

== Demographics ==
As of the census of 2000, there were 260 people, 95 households, and 70 families residing in the township. The population density was 7.5 inhabitants per square mile (2.9/km^{2}). There were 103 housing units at an average density of 3.0 per square mile (1.2/km^{2}). The racial makeup of the township was 100.00% White. Hispanic or Latino of any race were 0.38% of the population.

There were 95 households, out of which 35.8% had children under the age of 18 living with them, 73.7% were married couples living together, 1.1% had a female householder with no husband present, and 25.3% were non-families. 22.1% of all households were made up of individuals, and 10.5% had someone living alone who was 65 years of age or older. The average household size was 2.74 and the average family size was 3.28.

In the township the population was spread out, with 28.1% under the age of 18, 6.2% from 18 to 24, 22.7% from 25 to 44, 28.8% from 45 to 64, and 14.2% who were 65 years of age or older. The median age was 41 years. For every 100 females, there were 94.0 males. For every 100 females age 18 and over, there were 96.8 males.

The median income for a household in the township was $45,000, and the median income for a family was $54,250. Males had a median income of $31,250 versus $22,917 for females. The per capita income for the township was $20,390. None of the families and 1.2% of the population were living below the poverty line.
