= Fremont Lake (Murray County, Minnesota) =

Lake in the state of Minnesota, United States

- Location within Minnesota
- Location: Murray County, Minnesota
- Coordinates: 44°8′50″N 95°40′52″W
- Type: lake

Fremont Lake is a lake in Murray County, in the U.S. state of Minnesota.

Fremont Lake was named for John C. Frémont (1813–1890), an explorer of the area.

== See also ==
- List of lakes in Minnesota
