= Manyaska Township, Martin County, Minnesota =

Manyaska Township, Minnesota
- Township
- Location within the state of Minnesota Manyaska Township, Minnesota (the United States)
- Coordinates: 43°38′30″N 94°41′3″W
- Country: United States
- State: Minnesota
- County: Martin

Area
  - Total: 34.4 sq mi (89.1 km^{2})
  - Land: 33.8 sq mi (87.6 km^{2})
  - Water: 0.58 sq mi (1.5 km^{2})
- Elevation: 1,270 ft (387 m)

Population (2000)
  - Total: 337
  - Density: 9.8/sq mi (3.8/km^{2})
- Time zone: UTC-6 (Central (CST))
  - Summer (DST): UTC-5 (CDT)
- FIPS code: 27-40058
- GNIS feature ID: 0664897

Manyaska Township is a township in Martin County, Minnesota, United States. The population was 337 at the 2000 census.

Manyaska is a name of Sioux Indian origin.

== Geography ==
According to the United States Census Bureau, the township has a total area of 34.4 square miles (89.1 km^{2}), of which 33.8 square miles (87.6 km^{2}) is land and 0.6 square mile (1.5 km^{2}) (1.63%) is water.

== Demographics ==
As of the census of 2000, there were 337 people, 129 households, and 101 families residing in the township. The population density was 10.0 inhabitants per square mile (3.9/km^{2}). There were 160 housing units at an average density of 4.7 per square mile (1.8/km^{2}). The racial makeup of the township was 96.14% White, 0.30% Asian, 2.08% from other races, and 1.48% from two or more races. Hispanic or Latino of any race were 3.26% of the population.

There were 129 households, out of which 34.1% had children under the age of 18 living with them, 73.6% were married couples living together, 3.1% had a female householder with no husband present, and 21.7% were non-families. 19.4% of all households were made up of individuals, and 9.3% had someone living alone who was 65 years of age or older. The average household size was 2.61 and the average family size was 3.01.

In the township the population was spread out, with 26.1% under the age of 18, 5.9% from 18 to 24, 22.0% from 25 to 44, 27.3% from 45 to 64, and 18.7% who were 65 years of age or older. The median age was 43 years. For every 100 females, there were 91.5 males. For every 100 females age 18 and over, there were 93.0 males.

The median income for a household in the township was $46,563, and the median income for a family was $49,271. Males had a median income of $30,417 versus $23,333 for females. The per capita income for the township was $22,468. About 1.8% of families and 5.5% of the population were below the poverty line, including 7.7% of those under age 18 and 3.9% of those age 65 or over.
