= Nash (given name) =

Nash is a masculine given name and nickname which may refer to:

== Given name ==
- Nash Buckingham (1880–1971), American author and conservationist
- Nash Candelaria (1928–2016), American novelist
- Nash Chambers (born 1974), Australian musician
- Nash Edgerton (born 1973), Australian film director and stuntman
- Nash Grier (born 1997), American social media personality and actor
- Nash Grose (1740–1814), British judge
- Nash Higgins (1896–1984), American football player and coach
- Nash Jensen (born 1999), American football player
- Nash Jones (born 2002), American football player
- Nash Kato (born 1965), a member of the American alternative rock band Urge Overkill
- Nash Rawiller (born 1974), Australian jockey
- Nash Roberts (1918–2010), American meteorologist
- Nash Turner (1881–1937), American jockey
- Nash Winstead (1925–2008), American university administrator

== Nickname ==
- Nash Aguas (born 1998), Filipino actor and politician
