= East Chain Township, Martin County, Minnesota =

Coordinates: 43°32′35″N 94°18′30″W

East Chain Township is a township in Martin County, Minnesota, United States. The population was 345 at the 2000 census.

== History ==
East Chain Township took its name from the East Chain of lakes.

== Geography ==
According to the United States Census Bureau, the township has a total area of 36.0 square miles (93 km^{2}), of which 35.2 square miles (91 km^{2}) is land and 0.7 square miles (1.8 km^{2}) (2.06%) is water.

== Demographics ==
As of the census of 2000, there were 345 people, 127 households, and 100 families residing in the township. The population density was 9.8 people per square mile (3.8/km^{2}). There were 133 housing units at an average density of 3.8/sq mi (1.5/km^{2}). The racial makeup of the township was 99.71% White and 0.29% Asian. Hispanic or Latino of any race were 0.58% of the population.

There were 127 households, out of which 40.9% had children under the age of 18 living with them, 72.4% were married couples living together, 5.5% had a female householder with no husband present, and 20.5% were non-families. 17.3% of all households were made up of individuals, and 7.1% had someone living alone who was 65 years of age or older. The average household size was 2.72 and the average family size was 3.07.

In the township the population was spread out, with 29.6% under the age of 18, 6.7% from 18 to 24, 27.5% from 25 to 44, 23.8% from 45 to 64, and 12.5% who were 65 years of age or older. The median age was 38 years. For every 100 females, there were 115.6 males. For every 100 females age 18 and over, there were 104.2 males.

The median income for a household in the township was $43,750, and the median income for a family was $48,500. Males had a median income of $27,679 versus $21,346 for females. The per capita income for the township was $20,762. About 4.8% of families and 6.3% of the population were below the poverty line, including 3.9% of those under age 18 and 8.7% of those age 65 or over.
