= Lake Fremont Township, Martin County, Minnesota =

Lake Fremont Township, Minnesota
- Township
- Location within the state of Minnesota Lake Fremont Township, Minnesota (the United States)
- Coordinates: 43°32′33″N 94°47′2″W
- Country: United States
- State: Minnesota
- County: Martin

Area
  - Total: 36.0 sq mi (93.2 km^{2})
  - Land: 36.0 sq mi (93.2 km^{2})
  - Water: 0 sq mi (0.0 km^{2})
- Elevation: 1,329 ft (405 m)

Population (2000)
  - Total: 175
  - Density: 4.9/sq mi (1.9/km^{2})
- Time zone: UTC-6 (Central (CST))
  - Summer (DST): UTC-5 (CDT)
- FIPS code: 27-34334
- GNIS feature ID: 0664674

Lake Fremont Township is a township in Martin County, Minnesota, United States. The population was 175 at the 2000 census.

Lake Fremont Township was organized in 1872, and named for a now-dry lake which was named for John C. Frémont.

== Geography ==
According to the United States Census Bureau, the township has a total area of 36.0 square miles (93 km^{2}), all land.

== Demographics ==
As of the census of 2000, there were 175 people, 72 households, and 52 families residing in the township. The population density was 4.9 inhabitants per square mile (1.9/km^{2}). There were 83 housing units at an average density of 2.3 per square mile (0.89/km^{2}). The racial makeup of the township was 98.29% White and 1.71% Asian.

There were 72 households, out of which 23.6% had children under the age of 18 living with them, 68.1% were married couples living together, 2.8% had a female householder with no husband present, and 26.4% were non-families. 23.6% of all households were made up of individuals, and 8.3% had someone living alone who was 65 years of age or older. The average household size was 2.43 and the average family size was 2.87.

In the township the population was spread out, with 19.4% under the age of 18, 8.6% from 18 to 24, 20.0% from 25 to 44, 37.1% from 45 to 64, and 14.9% who were 65 years of age or older. The median age was 46 years. For every 100 females, there were 113.4 males. For every 100 females age 18 and over, there were 107.4 males.

The median income for a household in the township was $35,938, and the median income for a family was $38,438. Males had a median income of $29,375 versus $14,167 for females. The per capita income for the township was $20,036. None of the families and 1.5% of the population were living below the poverty line.
