= Rolling Green Township, Martin County, Minnesota =

Rolling Green Township, Minnesota
- Township
- Location within the state of Minnesota Rolling Green Township, Minnesota (the United States)
- Coordinates: 43°38′16″N 94°32′51″W
- Country: United States
- State: Minnesota
- County: Martin

Area
  - Total: 35.7 sq mi (92.4 km^{2})
  - Land: 34.9 sq mi (90.4 km^{2})
  - Water: 0.73 sq mi (1.9 km^{2})
- Elevation: 1,260 ft (384 m)

Population (2000)
  - Total: 309
  - Density: 8.8/sq mi (3.4/km^{2})
- Time zone: UTC-6 (Central (CST))
  - Summer (DST): UTC-5 (CDT)
- FIPS code: 27-55258
- GNIS feature ID: 0665447

Rolling Green Township is a township in Martin County, Minnesota, United States. The population was 309 at the 2000 census.

Rolling Green Township was named for the rolling green hills within its borders.

== Geography ==
According to the United States Census Bureau, the township has a total area of 35.7 square miles (92.4 km^{2}), of which 34.9 square miles (90.4 km^{2}) is land and 0.8 square mile (1.9 km^{2}) (2.10%) is water.

== Demographics ==
As of the census of 2000, there were 309 people, 113 households, and 89 families residing in the township. The population density was 8.9 people per square mile (3.4/km^{2}). There were 122 housing units at an average density of 3.5/sq mi (1.3/km^{2}). The racial makeup of the township was 96.12% White, 1.29% Asian, 1.29% from other races, and 1.29% from two or more races. Hispanic or Latino of any race were 1.29% of the population.

There were 113 households, out of which 35.4% had children under the age of 18 living with them, 73.5% were married couples living together, 1.8% had a female householder with no husband present, and 21.2% were non-families. 17.7% of all households were made up of individuals, and 8.8% had someone living alone who was 65 years of age or older. The average household size was 2.73 and the average family size was 3.06.

In the township the population was spread out, with 27.2% under the age of 18, 6.1% from 18 to 24, 28.2% from 25 to 44, 27.2% from 45 to 64, and 11.3% who were 65 years of age or older. The median age was 38 years. For every 100 females, there were 127.2 males. For every 100 females age 18 and over, there were 122.8 males.

The median income for a household in the township was $42,813, and the median income for a family was $49,500. Males had a median income of $30,625 versus $23,750 for females. The per capita income for the township was $18,539. About 3.9% of families and 8.5% of the population were below the poverty line, including 19.5% of those under the age of eighteen and none of those 65 or over.
