= Center Creek (Minnesota) =

Stream in Minnesota, U.S.

Coordinates: 43°44′11″N 94°10′35″W

Center Creek is a stream in the U.S. state of Minnesota.

Center Creek was named from the fact it heads near the Central Chain of lakes.

== See also ==
- List of rivers of Minnesota
