= Fraser Township, Martin County, Minnesota =

Fraser Township, Minnesota
- Township
- Location within the state of Minnesota Fraser Township, Minnesota (the United States)
- Coordinates: 43°42′54″N 94°33′0″W
- Country: United States
- State: Minnesota
- County: Martin

Area
  - Total: 36.8 sq mi (95.2 km^{2})
  - Land: 36.5 sq mi (94.5 km^{2})
  - Water: 0.27 sq mi (0.7 km^{2})
- Elevation: 1,194 ft (364 m)

Population (2000)
  - Total: 316
  - Density: 8.5/sq mi (3.3/km^{2})
- Time zone: UTC-6 (Central (CST))
  - Summer (DST): UTC-5 (CDT)
- FIPS code: 27-22436
- GNIS feature ID: 0664220

Fraser Township is a township in Martin County, Minnesota, United States. The population was 316 at the 2000 census.

Fraser Township was named for Abraham N. Fraser, a pioneer settler.

== Geography ==
According to the United States Census Bureau, the township has a total area of 36.8 square miles (95 km^{2}), of which 36.5 square miles (95 km^{2}) is land and 0.2 square miles (0.52 km^{2}) (0.68%) is water.

== Demographics ==
As of the census of 2000, there were 316 people, 118 households, and 92 families residing in the township. The population density was 8.7 inhabitants per square mile (3.4/km^{2}). There were 121 housing units at an average density of 3.3 per square mile (1.3/km^{2}). The racial makeup of the township was 99.05% White, 0.32% Native American, 0.32% Asian, and 0.32% from two or more races.

There were 118 households, out of which 37.3% had children under the age of 18 living with them, 68.6% were married couples living together, 1.7% had a female householder with no husband present, and 22.0% were non-families. 19.5% of all households were made up of individuals, and 8.5% had someone living alone who was 65 years of age or older. The average household size was 2.68 and the average family size was 3.00.

In the township the population was spread out, with 28.5% under the age of 18, 7.6% from 18 to 24, 30.1% from 25 to 44, 20.3% from 45 to 64, and 13.6% who were 65 years of age or older. The median age was 38 years. For every 100 females, there were 112.1 males. For every 100 females age 18 and over, there were 121.6 males.

The median income for a household in the township was $44,219, and the median income for a family was $45,278. Males had a median income of $29,375 versus $21,429 for females. The per capita income for the township was $19,421. About 2.1% of families and 6.5% of the population were below the poverty line, including 7.5% of those under age 18 and 7.5% of those age 65 or over.
