= Fox Lake (Martin County, Minnesota) =

Lake in the state of Minnesota, United States

- Location within Minnesota
- Location: Martin County, Minnesota
- Coordinates: 43°40′37″N 94°41′52″W
- Type: lake

Fox Lake is a lake in Martin County, Minnesota, in the United States.

Fox Lake is the English translation of the Native American name.

== See also ==
- List of lakes in Minnesota
