= Tenhassen Township, Martin County, Minnesota =

Tenhassen Township, Minnesota
- Township
- Location within the state of Minnesota Tenhassen Township, Minnesota (the United States)
- Coordinates: 43°32′11″N 94°32′14″W
- Country: United States
- State: Minnesota
- County: Martin

Area
  - Total: 36.6 sq mi (94.9 km^{2})
  - Land: 32.0 sq mi (82.9 km^{2})
  - Water: 4.6 sq mi (11.9 km^{2})
- Elevation: 1,220 ft (372 m)

Population (2000)
  - Total: 253
  - Density: 8.0/sq mi (3.1/km^{2})
- Time zone: UTC-6 (Central (CST))
  - Summer (DST): UTC-5 (CDT)
- FIPS code: 27-64372
- GNIS feature ID: 0665772

Tenhassen Township is a township in Martin County, Minnesota, United States. The population was 253 at the 2000 census.

== History ==
Tenhassen Township was organized in 1865. Tenhassen is a name derived from the Sioux language meaning "the tree of sweet juice".

== Geography ==
According to the United States Census Bureau, the township has a total area of 36.6 square miles (94.9 km^{2}), of which 32.0 square miles (83.0 km^{2}) is land and 4.6 square miles (11.9 km^{2}) (12.56%) is water.

== Demographics ==
As of the census of 2000, there were 253 people, 108 households, and 77 families residing in the township. The population density was 7.9 people per square mile (3.0/km^{2}). There were 125 housing units at an average density of 3.9/sq mi (1.5/km^{2}). The racial makeup of the township was 98.81% White, 0.40% Pacific Islander, 0.79% from other races.

There were 108 households, out of which 25.0% had children under the age of 18 living with them, 67.6% were married couples living together, 0.9% had a female householder with no husband present, and 27.8% were non-families. 23.1% of all households were made up of individuals, and 16.7% had someone living alone who was 65 years of age or older. The average household size was 2.34 and the average family size was 2.78.

In the township the population was spread out, with 18.6% under the age of 18, 5.5% from 18 to 24, 22.1% from 25 to 44, 30.0% from 45 to 64, and 23.7% who were 65 years of age or older. The median age was 46 years. For every 100 females, there were 102.4 males. For every 100 females age 18 and over, there were 100.0 males.

The median income for a household in the township was $36,146, and the median income for a family was $40,000. Males had a median income of $23,393 versus $19,688 for females. The per capita income for the township was $23,902. About 6.6% of families and 7.0% of the population were below the poverty line, including 4.8% of those under the age of eighteen and 14.5% of those 65 or over.
