= Nashville Township, Martin County, Minnesota =

Nashville Township, Minnesota
- Township
- Location within the state of Minnesota Nashville Township, Minnesota (the United States)
- Coordinates: 43°48′34″N 94°18′9″W
- Country: United States
- State: Minnesota
- County: Martin

Area
  - Total: 36.4 sq mi (94.4 km^{2})
  - Land: 36.4 sq mi (94.4 km^{2})
  - Water: 0 sq mi (0.0 km^{2})
- Elevation: 1,102 ft (336 m)

Population (2000)
  - Total: 234
  - Density: 6.5/sq mi (2.5/km^{2})
- Time zone: UTC-6 (Central (CST))
  - Summer (DST): UTC-5 (CDT)
- FIPS code: 27-44962
- GNIS feature ID: 0665070

Nashville Township is a township in Martin County, Minnesota, United States. The population was 234 at the 2000 census.

== History ==
Nashville Township was organized in 1864, and named for A. M. Nash, an early settler.

== Geography ==
According to the United States Census Bureau, the township has a total area of 36.5 square miles (94.4 km^{2}), all land.

== Demographics ==
As of the census of 2000, there were 234 people, 94 households, and 75 families residing in the township. The population density was 6.4 people per square mile (2.5 people/km^{2}). There were 100 housing units at an average density of 2.7 per square mile (1.0/km^{2}). The racial makeup of the township was 98.72% White, 0.43% Native American, and 0.85% from two or more races. Hispanic or Latino of any race were 0.43% of the population.

There were 94 households, out of which 29.8% had children under the age of 18 living with them, 74.5% were married couples living together, 3.2% had a female householder with no husband present, and 20.2% were non-families. 19.1% of all households were made up of individuals, and 11.7% had someone living alone who was 65 years of age or older. The average household size was 2.47 and the average family size was 2.81.

In the township the population was spread out, with 22.6% under the age of 18, 7.7% from 18 to 24, 27.4% from 25 to 44, 23.5% from 45 to 64, and 18.8% who were 65 years of age or older. The median age was 42 years. For every 100 females, there were 114.7 males. For every 100 females age 18 and over, there were 108.0 males.

The median income for a household in the township was $39,750, and the median income for a family was $46,875. Males had a median income of $30,625 versus $24,000 for females. The per capita income for the township was $25,088. About 2.4% of families and 3.5% of the population were below the poverty line, including 10.2% of those under the age of eighteen and none of those 65 or over.
