= Granada, Minnesota =

City in Minnesota, United States

- City
- Location within Martin County and state of Minnesota
- Coordinates: 43°41′35″N 94°20′58″W
- Country: United States
- State: Minnesota
- County: Martin

Government
  - Type: Mayor-Council
  - Mayor: Darren Maday

Area
  - Total: 0.57 sq mi (1.48 km^{2})
  - Land: 0.57 sq mi (1.48 km^{2})
  - Water: 0 sq mi (0.00 km^{2})
- Elevation: 1,129 ft (344 m)

Population (2020)
  - Total: 291
  - Density: 509.7/sq mi (196.79/km^{2})
- Time zone: UTC-6 (Central (CST))
  - Summer (DST): UTC-5 (CDT)
- ZIP code: 56039
- Area code: 507
- FIPS code: 27-24884
- GNIS feature ID: 2394947

Granada (/ɡrəˈneɪdə/ grə-NAY-də) is a city in Martin County, Minnesota, United States. The population was 291 at the 2020 census.

== History ==
A post office called Granada has been in operation since 1891. The city was named after Granada, Spain.

== Geography ==
Granada is in eastern Martin County along County Road 53. It is one mile north of Interstate 90 and 8 miles (13 km) northeast of Fairmont, the county seat.

According to the U.S. Census Bureau, the city has a total area of 0.57 square miles (1.48 km^{2}), all land. Center Creek passes through the southern end of the city, flowing easterly to join the Blue Earth River south of Winnebago.

== Demographics ==
Historical population
Census	Pop.	Note	%±
1900	309		—
1910	333		7.8%
1920	387		16.2%
1930	397		2.6%
1940	431		8.6%
1950	403		−6.5%
1960	418		3.7%
1970	381		−8.9%
1980	377		−1.0%
1990	374		−0.8%
2000	317		−15.2%
2010	303		−4.4%
2020	291		−4.0%
U.S. Decennial Census

=== 2010 census ===
As of the census of 2010, there were 303 people, 129 households, and 83 families living in the city. The population density was 513.6 inhabitants per square mile (198.3/km^{2}). There were 147 housing units at an average density of 249.2 per square mile (96.2/km^{2}). The racial makeup of the city was 98.7% White, 0.3% African American, 0.7% from other races, and 0.3% from two or more races. Hispanic or Latino of any race were 0.7% of the population.

There were 129 households, of which 28.7% had children under the age of 18 living with them, 45.7% were married couples living together, 12.4% had a female householder with no husband present, 6.2% had a male householder with no wife present, and 35.7% were non-families. 34.1% of all households were made up of individuals, and 17.9% had someone living alone who was 65 years of age or older. The average household size was 2.35 and the average family size was 2.90.

The median age in the city was 41.6 years. 25.1% of residents were under the age of 18; 7.8% were between the ages of 18 and 24; 18.8% were from 25 to 44; 34.7% were from 45 to 64; and 13.5% were 65 years of age or older. The gender makeup of the city was 53.5% male and 46.5% female.

=== 2000 census ===
As of the census of 2000, there were 317 people, 131 households, and 75 families living in the city. The population density was 539.9 inhabitants per square mile (208.5/km^{2}). There were 136 housing units at an average density of 231.6 per square mile (89.4/km^{2}). The racial makeup of the city was 99.68% White and 0.32% Native American. 0.32% of the population were Hispanic or Latino of any race.

There were 131 households, out of which 32.8% had children under the age of 18 living with them, 52.7% were married couples living together, 4.6% had a female householder with no husband present, and 42.7% were non-families. 38.2% of all households were made up of individuals, and 16.0% had someone living alone who was 65 years of age or older. The average household size was 2.42 and the average family size was 3.37.

In the city, the population was spread out, with 27.1% under the age of 18, 6.6% from 18 to 24, 29.0% from 25 to 44, 22.7% from 45 to 64, and 14.5% who were 65 years of age or older. The median age was 39 years. For every 100 females, there were 104.5 males. For every 100 females age 18 and over, there were 90.9 males.

The median income for a household in the city was $31,042, and the median income for a family was $42,917. Males had a median income of $23,750 versus $22,500 for females. The per capita income for the city was $14,506. 6.8% of the population and 8.5% of families were below the poverty line. Out of the total population, 8.1% of those under the age of 18 and 5.0% of those 65 and older were living below the poverty line.

== Education ==
Granada is part of the Granada-Huntley-East Chain School District. The school's boys' basketball team won the MSHSL Class A State Championship in 2009.
