= Pleasant Prairie Township, Martin County, Minnesota =

Pleasant Prairie Township, Minnesota
- Township
- Location within the state of Minnesota Pleasant Prairie Township, Minnesota (the United States)
- Coordinates: 43°37′59″N 94°19′3″W
- Country: United States
- State: Minnesota
- County: Martin

Area
  - Total: 36.0 sq mi (93.2 km^{2})
  - Land: 35.8 sq mi (92.7 km^{2})
  - Water: 0.19 sq mi (0.5 km^{2})
- Elevation: 1,129 ft (344 m)

Population (2000)
  - Total: 273
  - Density: 7.5/sq mi (2.9/km^{2})
- Time zone: UTC-6 (Central (CST))
  - Summer (DST): UTC-5 (CDT)
- FIPS code: 27-51622
- GNIS feature ID: 0665323

Pleasant Prairie Township is a township in Martin County, Minnesota, United States. The population was 273 at the 2000 census.

Pleasant Prairie Township was named for the typical landscapes within the township.

== Geography ==
According to the United States Census Bureau, the township has a total area of 36.0 square miles (93.2 km^{2}), of which 35.8 square miles (92.7 km^{2}) is land and 0.2 square mile (0.5 km^{2}) (0.56%) is water.

== Demographics ==
As of the census of 2000, there were 273 people, 113 households, and 82 families residing in the township. The population density was 7.6 inhabitants per square mile (2.9/km^{2}). There were 121 housing units at an average density of 3.4 per square mile (1.3/km^{2}). The racial makeup of the township was 98.90% White, 0.37% Native American, and 0.73% from two or more races. Hispanic or Latino of any race were 0.37% of the population.

There were 113 households, out of which 29.2% had children under the age of 18 living with them, 66.4% were married couples living together, 2.7% had a female householder with no husband present, and 27.4% were non-families. 25.7% of all households were made up of individuals, and 15.0% had someone living alone who was 65 years of age or older. The average household size was 2.42 and the average family size was 2.88.

In the township the population was spread out, with 23.4% under the age of 18, 6.2% from 18 to 24, 22.0% from 25 to 44, 26.7% from 45 to 64, and 21.6% who were 65 years of age or older. The median age was 44 years. For every 100 females, there were 111.6 males. For every 100 females age 18 and over, there were 102.9 males.

The median income for a household in the township was $34,375, and the median income for a family was $42,000. Males had a median income of $21,818 versus $24,000 for females. The per capita income for the township was $15,325. About 5.6% of families and 12.9% of the population were below the poverty line, including 17.4% of those under the age of eighteen and 21.7% of those 65 or over.
