= Martin County, Minnesota =

County in Minnesota, United States

- County
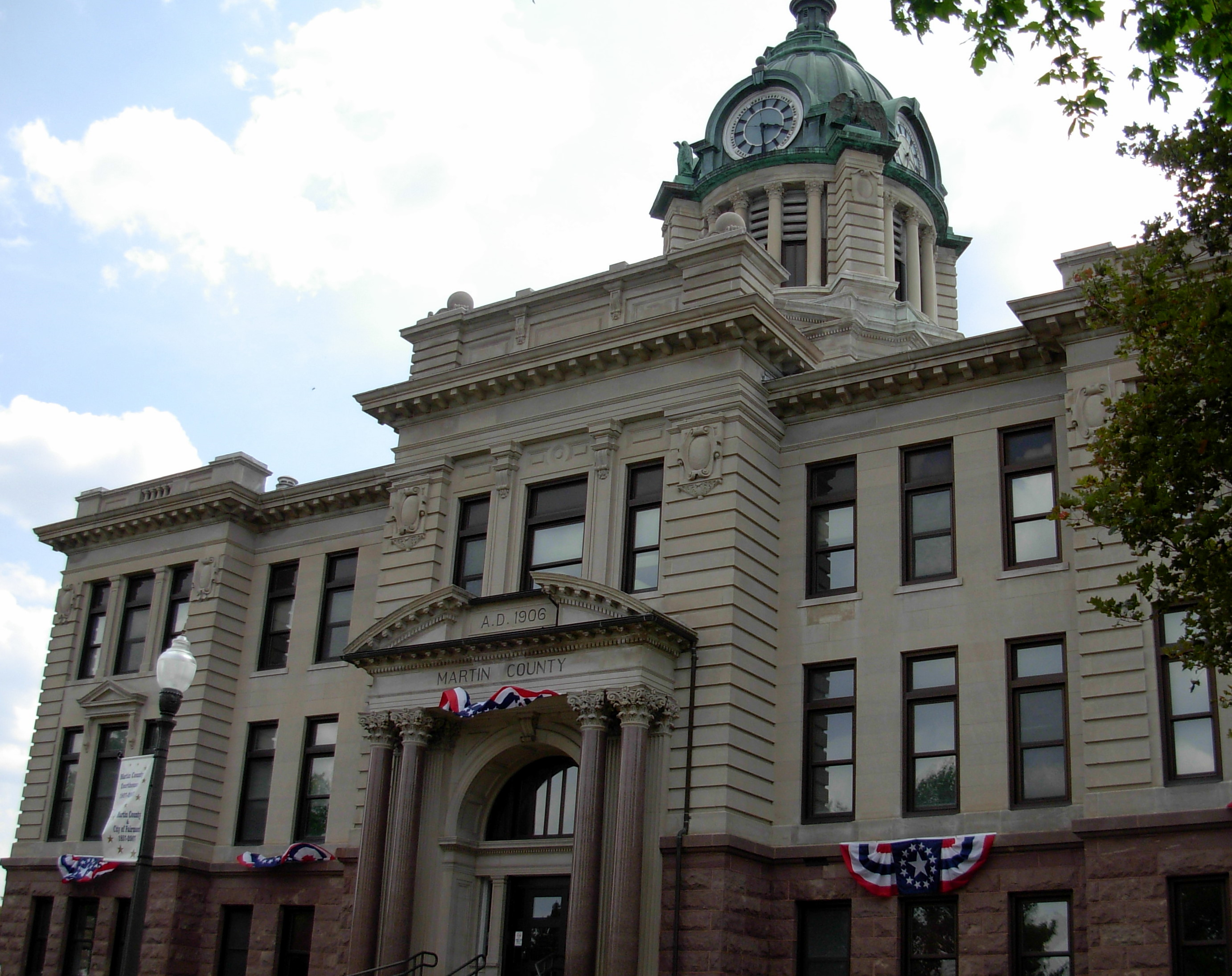
- Martin County Courthouse in Fairmont

- Location within the U.S. state of Minnesota
- Coordinates: 43°41′N 94°34′W
- Country: United States
- State: Minnesota
- Founded: May 23, 1857
- Named for: Henry Martin
- Seat: Fairmont
- Largest city: Fairmont

Area
  - Total: 730 sq mi (1,900 km^{2})
  - Land: 712 sq mi (1,840 km^{2})
  - Water: 17 sq mi (44 km^{2}) 2.4%

Population (2020)
  - Total: 20,025
  - Estimate (2025): 19,440 ▼
  - Density: 28.1/sq mi (10.9/km^{2})
- Time zone: UTC−6 (Central)
  - Summer (DST): UTC−5 (CDT)
- Congressional district: 1st
- Website: www.co.martin.mn.us

Martin County is a county in Minnesota, United States. As of the 2020 census, the population was 20,025. Its county seat is Fairmont.

== History ==
The county was created by the Minnesota Territory legislature on May 23, 1857, with Fair Mount (which was also platted in 1857) designated as county seat. The town's name was later shortened to Fairmont. Two explanations have been advanced for the county's name. A delegate to the US Congress from the Wisconsin Territory, Morgan Lewis Martin, introduced the legislative act to organize the Minnesota Territory. But in 1904 the county's oldest residents attested that the name referred to Henry Martin, an early settler from Connecticut who ran several businesses during the pre-territory era.

== Geography ==
Martin County lies on Minnesota's border with Iowa. The East Fork of the Des Moines River flows southeastward through the lower western part of the county. The county terrain consists of low rolling hills, dotted with lakes and ponds, completely devoted to agriculture where possible. The terrain slopes to the east and north, with its highest point near its southwest corner, at 1,407 ft (429 m) ASL. The county has an area of 730 square miles (1,900 km^{2}), of which 712 square miles (1,840 km^{2}) is land and 17 square miles (44 km^{2}) (2.4%) is water.

Soils of Martin County

=== Major highways ===
- Interstate 90
- Minnesota State Highway 4
- Minnesota State Highway 15
- Minnesota State Highway 263

=== Airports ===
- Fairmont Municipal Airport (FRM)

=== Adjacent counties ===
- Watonwan County - north
- Blue Earth County - northeast
- Faribault County - east
- Kossuth County, Iowa - southeast
- Emmet County, Iowa - southwest
- Jackson County - west

=== Protected areas ===
- Ceylon State Wildlife Management Area
- Fox Lake Refuge
- Luedtke State Wildlife Management Area
- Perch Creek State Wildlife Management Area
- State Wildlife Management Area
- Truman Wildlife Area

=== Lakes ===
- Amber Lake
- Big Twin Lake
- Bright Lake
- Budd Lake
- Buffalo Lake (Cedar Township)
- Buffalo Lake (Rutland Township)
- Canright Lake
- Cedar Lake
- Clam Lake
- Clayton Lake
- Clear Lake
- Creek Lake
- Eagle Lake
- East Chain Lake
- Fish Lake (Cedar Township)
- Fish Lake (Lake Belt Township)
- Fox Lake
- Hall Lake
- High Lake
- Iowa Lake (part)
- Kiester Lake
- Lake Charlotte
- Lake George
- Lake Imogene
- Lake Seymour
- Little Hat Lake
- Little Twin Lake
- Martin Lake
- Mud Lake
- Murphy Lake
- North Lake
- North Silver Lake
- Okamanpeedan Lake (part)
- Perch Lake
- Pierce Lake
- Rose Lake
- Round Lake (Fox Lake Township)
- Round Lake (Waverly Township)
- Sager Lakes
- Sisseton Lake
- South Silver Lake
- Susan Lake
- Temperance Lake
- Tuttle Lake
- Watkins Lake
- Wilmert Lake

== Demographics ==
Historical population
Census	Pop.	Note	%±
1860	151		—
1870	3,867		2,460.9%
1880	5,249		35.7%
1890	9,408		79.2%
1900	16,936		80.0%
1910	17,518		3.4%
1920	21,085		20.4%
1930	22,401		6.2%
1940	24,656		10.1%
1950	25,655		4.1%
1960	26,986		5.2%
1970	24,316		−9.9%
1980	24,687		1.5%
1990	22,914		−7.2%
2000	21,802		−4.9%
2010	20,840		−4.4%
2020	20,025		−3.9%
2025 (est.)	19,440	▼	−2.9%
U.S. Decennial Census; 1790-1960 1900-1990; 1990-2000 2010-2020

=== Racial and ethnic composition ===
Martin County, Minnesota – Racial and ethnic composition Note: the US Census treats Hispanic/Latino as an ethnic category. This table excludes Latinos from the racial categories and assigns them to a separate category. Hispanics/Latinos may be of any race.
Race / Ethnicity (NH = Non-Hispanic)	Pop 1980	Pop 1990	Pop 2000	Pop 2010	Pop 2020	% 1980	% 1990	% 2000	% 2010	% 2020
White alone (NH)	24,470	22,651	21,100	19,766	17,947	99.12%	98.85%	96.78%	94.85%	89.62%
Black or African American alone (NH)	9	9	53	62	112	0.04%	0.04%	0.24%	0.30%	0.56%
Native American or Alaska Native alone (NH)	15	29	21	54	32	0.06%	0.13%	0.10%	0.26%	0.16%
Asian alone (NH)	103	83	90	103	92	0.42%	0.36%	0.41%	0.49%	0.46%
Native Hawaiian or Pacific Islander alone (NH)	x	x	5	5	6	x	x	0.02%	0.02%	0.03%
Other race alone (NH)	11	5	10	4	46	0.04%	0.02%	0.05%	0.02%	0.23%
Mixed race or Multiracial (NH)	x	x	102	102	470	x	x	0.47%	0.49%	2.35%
Hispanic or Latino (any race)	79	137	421	744	1,320	0.32%	0.60%	1.93%	3.57%	6.59%
Total	24,687	22,914	21,802	20,840	20,025	100.00%	100.00%	100.00%	100.00%	100.00%

=== 2020 census ===
As of the 2020 census, the county had a population of 20,025. The median age was 44.9 years. 21.7% of residents were under the age of 18 and 23.4% of residents were 65 years of age or older. For every 100 females there were 97.8 males, and for every 100 females age 18 and over there were 97.1 males age 18 and over.

The racial makeup of the county was 91.7% White, 0.6% Black or African American, 0.4% American Indian and Alaska Native, 0.5% Asian, <0.1% Native Hawaiian and Pacific Islander, 2.6% from some other race, and 4.2% from two or more races. Hispanic or Latino residents of any race comprised 6.6% of the population.

41.9% of residents lived in urban areas, while 58.1% lived in rural areas.

There were 8,748 households in the county, of which 24.9% had children under the age of 18 living in them. Of all households, 47.5% were married-couple households, 20.0% were households with a male householder and no spouse or partner present, and 25.2% were households with a female householder and no spouse or partner present. About 33.3% of all households were made up of individuals and 16.4% had someone living alone who was 65 years of age or older.

There were 9,748 housing units, of which 10.3% were vacant. Among occupied housing units, 73.8% were owner-occupied and 26.2% were renter-occupied. The homeowner vacancy rate was 1.7% and the rental vacancy rate was 9.5%.

=== 2000 census ===
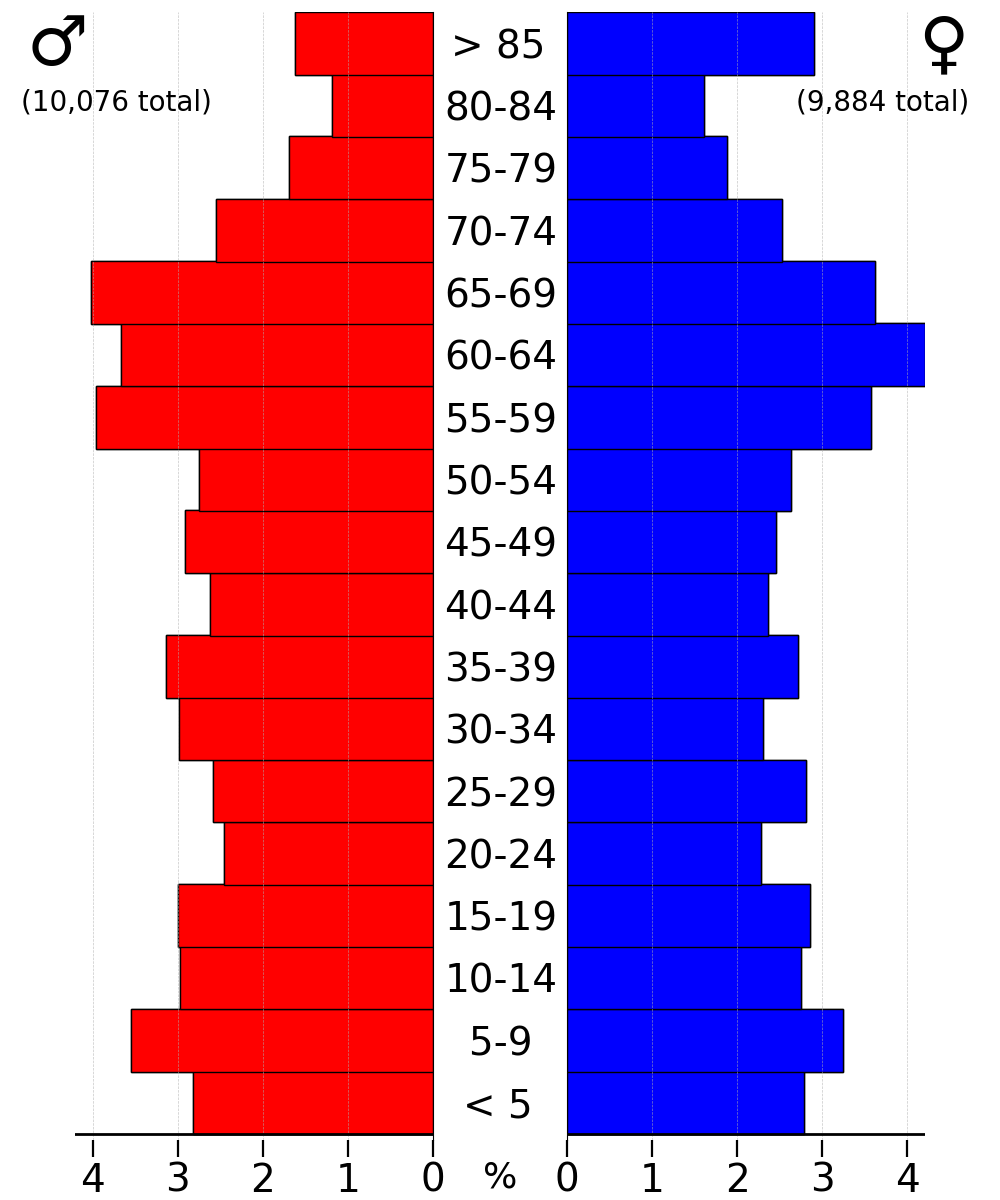
2022 US Census population pyramid for Martin County, from ACS 5-year estimates

As of the census of 2000, there were 21,802 people, 9,067 households, and 6,047 families in the county. The population density was 30.6 per square mile (11.8/km^{2}). There were 9,800 housing units at an average density of 13.8 per square mile (5.3/km^{2}). The racial makeup of the county was 97.22% White, 0.25% Black or African American, 0.10% Native American, 0.42% Asian, 0.02% Pacific Islander, 1.26% from other races, and 0.73% from two or more races. 1.93% of the population were Hispanic or Latino of any race. 51.6% were of German, 11.9% Norwegian, 5.9% Swedish and 5.0% English ancestry.

There were 9,067 households, out of which 29.80% had children under the age of 18 living with them, 56.60% were married couples living together, 7.20% had a female householder with no husband present, and 33.30% were non-families. 30.00% of all households were made up of individuals, and 15.20% had someone living alone who was 65 years of age or older. The average household size was 2.35 and the average family size was 2.92.

The county population contained 24.80% under the age of 18, 6.40% from 18 to 24, 24.90% from 25 to 44, 24.00% from 45 to 64, and 19.90% who were 65 years of age or older. The median age was 42 years. For every 100 females there were 95.30 males. For every 100 females age 18 and over, there were 91.50 males.

The median income for a household in the county was $34,810, and the median income for a family was $44,541. Males had a median income of $30,467 versus $21,780 for females. The per capita income for the county was $18,529. About 7.10% of families and 10.50% of the population were below the poverty line, including 15.10% of those under age 18 and 9.00% of those age 65 or over.

== Communities ==
=== Cities ===
- Ceylon
- Dunnell
- Fairmont (county seat)
- Granada
- Northrop
- Ormsby (part)
- Sherburn
- Trimont
- Truman
- Welcome

=== Unincorporated communities ===
- East Chain
- Fox Lake
- Imogene
- Nashville Center
- Wilbert

=== Townships ===
- Cedar Township
- Center Creek Township
- East Chain Township
- Elm Creek Township
- Fairmont Township
- Fox Lake Township
- Fraser Township
- Galena Township
- Jay Township
- Lake Belt Township
- Lake Fremont Township
- Manyaska Township
- Nashville Township
- Pleasant Prairie Township
- Rolling Green Township
- Rutland Township
- Silver Lake Township
- Tenhassen Township
- Waverly Township
- Westford Township

== Government and politics ==
Martin County has been reliably Republican for almost its entire existence. It has voted Republican in 36 of the 42 elections since the formation of the county and has only voted Democratic once since 1948.

United States presidential election results for Martin County, Minnesota
Year	Republican		Democratic		Third party(ies)	
Year	No.	%	No.	%	No.	%
1860	40	86.96%	6	13.04%	0	0.00%
1864	190	91.79%	17	8.21%	0	0.00%
1868	520	83.74%	101	16.26%	0	0.00%
1872	685	81.45%	156	18.55%	0	0.00%
1876	634	79.85%	160	20.15%	0	0.00%
1880	863	81.96%	190	18.04%	0	0.00%
1884	736	62.43%	260	22.05%	183	15.52%
1888	1,161	64.68%	471	26.24%	163	9.08%
1892	1,189	57.22%	661	31.81%	228	10.97%
1896	1,739	54.31%	1,327	41.44%	136	4.25%
1900	1,819	54.69%	1,233	37.07%	274	8.24%
1904	2,167	70.66%	656	21.39%	244	7.96%
1908	1,922	59.05%	1,054	32.38%	279	8.57%
1912	578	17.46%	1,141	34.47%	1,591	48.07%
1916	1,741	47.16%	1,756	47.56%	195	5.28%
1920	5,142	78.46%	1,221	18.63%	191	2.91%
1924	4,238	56.24%	751	9.97%	2,546	33.79%
1928	5,110	64.10%	2,822	35.40%	40	0.50%
1932	3,004	38.26%	4,731	60.26%	116	1.48%
1936	3,090	31.45%	6,492	66.08%	243	2.47%
1940	6,409	59.79%	4,290	40.02%	21	0.20%
1944	5,182	53.68%	4,443	46.02%	29	0.30%
1948	4,662	43.31%	6,015	55.88%	87	0.81%
1952	9,411	77.63%	2,673	22.05%	39	0.32%
1956	8,152	71.16%	3,289	28.71%	15	0.13%
1960	8,479	66.81%	4,194	33.04%	19	0.15%
1964	6,529	53.84%	5,575	45.98%	22	0.18%
1968	7,115	59.43%	4,271	35.67%	587	4.90%
1972	7,569	64.59%	3,816	32.57%	333	2.84%
1976	6,484	51.92%	5,672	45.42%	332	2.66%
1980	7,057	57.40%	4,301	34.98%	936	7.61%
1984	7,308	60.67%	4,673	38.80%	64	0.53%
1988	5,724	53.34%	4,922	45.87%	85	0.79%
1992	4,438	38.23%	4,019	34.62%	3,152	27.15%
1996	4,303	40.91%	4,718	44.86%	1,496	14.22%
2000	5,686	54.83%	4,166	40.17%	519	5.00%
2004	6,311	57.13%	4,590	41.55%	146	1.32%
2008	6,053	56.29%	4,413	41.04%	288	2.68%
2012	6,657	60.69%	4,054	36.96%	257	2.34%
2016	7,062	67.06%	2,733	25.95%	736	6.99%
2020	7,480	67.94%	3,305	30.02%	224	2.03%
2024	7,442	68.93%	3,171	29.37%	183	1.70%

County Board of Commissioners
Position	Name	District	Next Election
Commissioner and Chairperson	Kevin Kristenson	District 1	2028
Commissioner	Jaime Bleess	District 2	2026
Commissioner	Joe Loughmiller	District 3	2028
Commissioner	Richard Koons	District 4	2026
Commissioner	Billeye Rabbe	District 5	2028

State Legislature (2018-2020)
Position	Name	Affiliation	District
Senate	Julie Rosen	Republican	District 23
House of Representatives	Bob Gunther	Republican	District 23A

U.S Congress (2018-2020)
Position	Name	Affiliation	District
House of Representatives	Brad Finstad	Republican	1st
Senate	Amy Klobuchar	Democrat	N/A
Senate	Tina Smith	Democrat	N/A

== See also ==
- National Register of Historic Places listings in Martin County, Minnesota
