= Fairmont High School =

Fairmont High School may refer to:

- Fairmont High School (Durbanville, South Africa) — Durbanville, Western Cape
- Fairmont Junior/Senior High School — Fairmont, Minnesota
- Fairmont High School (North Carolina) — Fairmont, North Carolina
- Fairmont High School (Ohio) — Kettering, Ohio
- Fairmont Senior High School — Fairmont, West Virginia
- East Fairmont High School — Fairmont, West Virginia
- Fairmont Preparatory Academy — Anaheim, California
- Fairmont Heights High School — Capitol Heights, Maryland
