= Walker, Minnesota =

City in Minnesota, United States

Walker
- City
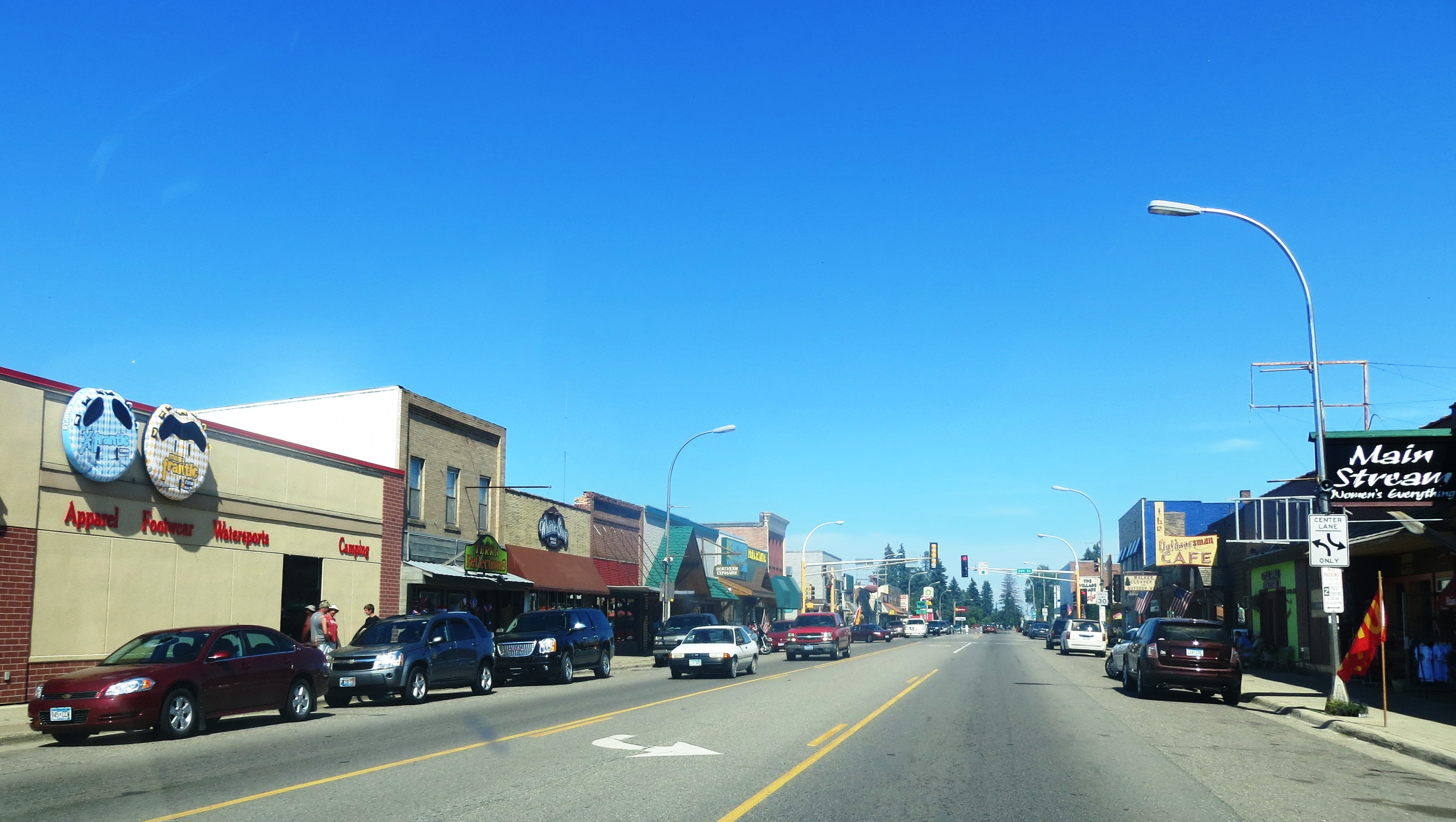
- Photo: Erlend Bjørtvedt
- Nickname: "The Big Place"
- Location of Walker within Cass County and state of Minnesota
- Coordinates: 47°05′59″N 94°35′52″W
- Country: United States
- State: Minnesota
- County: Cass

Area
  - Total: 2.81 sq mi (7.28 km^{2})
  - Land: 2.81 sq mi (7.28 km^{2})
  - Water: 0 sq mi (0.00 km^{2})
- Elevation: 1,352 ft (412 m)

Population (2020)
  - Total: 966
  - Estimate (2022): 987
  - Density: 343.8/sq mi (132.76/km^{2})
- Time zone: UTC-6 (Central (CST))
  - Summer (DST): UTC-5 (CDT)
- ZIP code: 56484
- Area code: 218
- FIPS code: 27-67792
- GNIS feature ID: 2397174
- Website: www.ci.walker.mn.us

Walker is a city in Cass County, Minnesota, United States. The population was 966 at the 2020 census. It is the county seat of Cass County.

Walker is part of the Brainerd Micropolitan Statistical Area.

Minnesota State Highways 34, 200, and 371 are three of the main routes in the city.

== History ==
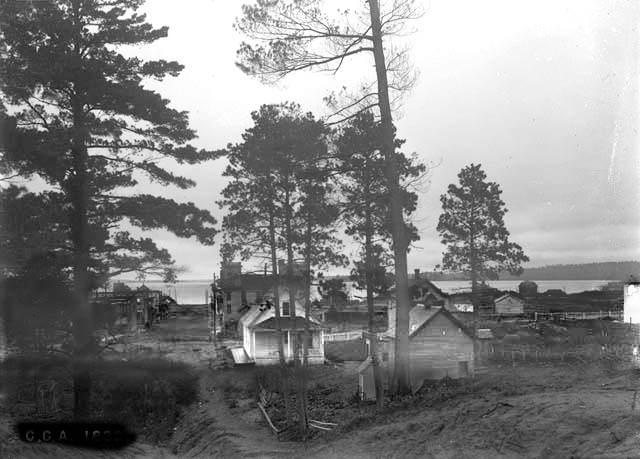
Walker, 1901

The area was inhabited for thousands of years by succeeding cultures of indigenous peoples. Before European settlement, the Ojibwe moved into the area from the Great Lakes, pushing out the historic Dakota peoples, such as the Assiniboine and Hidatsa. European American settlers followed the early fur traders and trappers, and encroached on Native American territories.

Following the construction of the railroad to the area, Patrick McGarry founded Walker in 1896. He named the settlement after the logging giant Thomas B. Walker, in hopes of luring construction of a sawmill. Walker instead chose to found and set up operations in nearby Akeley, because of his wife's moral objection to the bars and brothels in Walker, a rough frontier town. Walker developed with business, jobs and other services generated by four other logging companies.

Tourism later grew as a service industry. In the 20th century, people from urban areas came to more rural areas for recreation associated with lakes, fishing, hunting and water sports. The city reached its peak of population in 1950.

In 1907, Walker became the home of the Ah-Gwah-Ching Center, first constructed as a residential facility for tuberculosis (TB) patients, who at the time could be treated only with good nutrition and rest. By 1927, it had 300 patients. The facility had its own farm and dairy herd, the patients and staff put on skits and produced a newspaper, and it had its own railroad depot at one time. During the Great Depression, it was a site for display of art produced by artists paid by the WPA, and it had the state's largest WPA art collection. In 1962, the facility was adapted as a state nursing home for psychiatric patients. The complex was added to the National Register of Historic Places (NRHP) in 2001. The building was closed in 2008 and delisted from the NRHP following its 2019 demolition.

The Cass County Museum and research center, operated by the Cass County Historical Society, is located in Walker. It preserves and interprets the history of Cass County and its connection to Minnesota’s wider history.

== Geography ==
Walker is on the southwest corner of Leech Lake, Minnesota's third-largest lake. According to the United States Census Bureau, the city has an area of 2.47 square miles (6.40 km^{2}), all land. Nearby cities and towns include Hackensack, Akeley, Whipholt, Laporte, Bemidji, and Onigum. Onigum is one of 11 communities that make up the Leech Lake Indian Reservation.

The Paul Bunyan State Trail passes through the city along Leech Lake.

=== Climate ===
Walker has a humid continental climate (Köppen Dfb), with warm summers and cold, snowy winters.

Climate data for Walker, Minnesota, 1991–2020 normals, extremes 1908–present
Month	Jan	Feb	Mar	Apr	May	Jun	Jul	Aug	Sep	Oct	Nov	Dec	Year
Record high °F (°C)	52 (11)	59 (15)	83 (28)	94 (34)	93 (34)	98 (37)	103 (39)	103 (39)	97 (36)	89 (32)	72 (22)	60 (16)	103 (39)
Mean maximum °F (°C)	41.2 (5.1)	45.0 (7.2)	56.8 (13.8)	72.9 (22.7)	83.4 (28.6)	88.2 (31.2)	89.3 (31.8)	88.0 (31.1)	82.0 (27.8)	75.1 (23.9)	56.0 (13.3)	42.8 (6.0)	91.5 (33.1)
Mean daily maximum °F (°C)	19.3 (−7.1)	25.4 (−3.7)	37.8 (3.2)	52.0 (11.1)	66.0 (18.9)	74.6 (23.7)	79.0 (26.1)	76.7 (24.8)	68.0 (20.0)	53.3 (11.8)	37.2 (2.9)	24.8 (−4.0)	51.2 (10.6)
Daily mean °F (°C)	10.0 (−12.2)	14.8 (−9.6)	27.7 (−2.4)	41.4 (5.2)	55.2 (12.9)	64.6 (18.1)	69.0 (20.6)	67.0 (19.4)	58.4 (14.7)	44.8 (7.1)	29.5 (−1.4)	16.5 (−8.6)	41.6 (5.3)
Mean daily minimum °F (°C)	0.7 (−17.4)	4.2 (−15.4)	17.6 (−8.0)	30.9 (−0.6)	44.4 (6.9)	54.6 (12.6)	59.1 (15.1)	57.3 (14.1)	48.8 (9.3)	36.3 (2.4)	21.8 (−5.7)	8.2 (−13.2)	32.0 (0.0)
Mean minimum °F (°C)	−24.0 (−31.1)	−21.0 (−29.4)	−8.3 (−22.4)	13.7 (−10.2)	31.7 (−0.2)	42.3 (5.7)	47.7 (8.7)	46.5 (8.1)	34.3 (1.3)	21.6 (−5.8)	3.2 (−16.0)	−17.4 (−27.4)	−28.4 (−33.6)
Record low °F (°C)	−41 (−41)	−44 (−42)	−33 (−36)	−6 (−21)	18 (−8)	30 (−1)	40 (4)	32 (0)	22 (−6)	4 (−16)	−22 (−30)	−40 (−40)	−44 (−42)
Average precipitation inches (mm)	0.75 (19)	0.74 (19)	1.18 (30)	2.18 (55)	3.32 (84)	4.29 (109)	4.11 (104)	3.21 (82)	3.37 (86)	2.75 (70)	1.26 (32)	0.82 (21)	27.98 (711)
Average snowfall inches (cm)	10.5 (27)	6.6 (17)	8.1 (21)	1.1 (2.8)	0.0 (0.0)	0.0 (0.0)	0.0 (0.0)	0.0 (0.0)	0.0 (0.0)	0.2 (0.51)	7.9 (20)	7.6 (19)	42.0 (107)
Average precipitation days (≥ 0.01 in)	6.1	6.1	5.8	7.1	10.9	11.2	10.2	8.7	10.6	9.3	7.1	6.7	99.8
Average snowy days (≥ 0.1 in)	5.4	4.2	2.9	0.8	0.0	0.0	0.0	0.0	0.0	0.2	4.0	5.4	22.9
Source 1: NOAA (snow/snow days 1981–2010)
Source 2: National Weather Service

== Demographics ==
Historical population
Census	Pop.	Note	%±
1900	500		—
1910	917		83.4%
1920	785		−14.4%
1930	618		−21.3%
1940	939		51.9%
1950	1,192		26.9%
1960	1,180		−1.0%
1970	1,073		−9.1%
1980	970		−9.6%
1990	950		−2.1%
2000	1,069		12.5%
2010	941		−12.0%
2020	966		2.7%
2022 (est.)	987		2.2%
U.S. Decennial Census; 2020 Census

=== 2010 census ===
As of the census of 2010, there were 941 people, 452 households, and 205 families living in the city. The population density was 381.0 inhabitants per square mile (147.1/km^{2}). There were 605 housing units at an average density of 244.9 per square mile (94.6/km^{2}). The racial makeup of the city was 88.0% White, 7.2% Native American, 1.1% Asian, 0.5% from other races, and 3.2% from two or more races. Hispanic or Latino of any race were 1.3% of the population.

There were 452 households, of which 21.2% had children under the age of 18 living with them, 33.4% were married couples living together, 8.4% had a female householder with no husband present, 3.5% had a male householder with no wife present, and 54.6% were non-families. 48.0% of all households were made up of individuals, and 23.4% had someone living alone who was 65 years of age or older. The average household size was 1.93 and the average family size was 2.82.

The median age in the city was 49 years. 19.2% of residents were under the age of 18; 5% were between the ages of 18 and 24; 20.9% were from 25 to 44; 24.9% were from 45 to 64; and 30.1% were 65 years of age or older. The gender makeup of the city was 44.5% male and 55.5% female.

=== 2000 census ===
As of the census of 2000, there were 1,069 people, 449 households, and 258 families living in the city. The population density was 734.3 inhabitants per square mile (283.5/km^{2}). There were 517 housing units at an average density of 355.1 per square mile (137.1/km^{2}). The racial makeup of the city was 88.59% White, 0.09% African American, 8.98% Native American, 0.28% Asian, 0.28% from other races, and 1.78% from two or more races. Hispanic or Latino of any race were 1.03% of the population.

There were 449 households, out of which 24.7% had children under the age of 18 living with them, 43.7% were married couples living together, 10.0% had a female householder with no husband present, and 42.5% were non-families. 39.0% of all households were made up of individuals, and 22.5% had someone living alone who was 65 years of age or older. The average household size was 2.16 and the average family size was 2.86.

In the city, the population was spread out, with 22.5% under the age of 18, 5.7% from 18 to 24, 26.1% from 25 to 44, 21.0% from 45 to 64, and 24.6% who were 65 years of age or older. The median age was 42 years. For every 100 females, there were 92.3 males. For every 100 females age 18 and over, there were 86.9 males.

The median income for a household in the city was $33,125, and the median income for a family was $44,063. Males had a median income of $31,324 versus $25,435 for females. The per capita income for the city was $17,079. About 8.0% of families and 12.4% of the population were below the poverty line, including 15.3% of those under age 18 and 14.7% of those age 65 or over.

== Education ==
Walker Public Schools are part of the Walker-Hackensack-Akeley School District. Schools in the district include Walker-Hackensack-Akeley Elementary School and Walker-Hackensack-Akeley High School (WHA). Kevin Wellen is the Superintendent of Schools. The Walker-Hackensack-Akeley district was formed by the 1990 consolidation of the Walker and Akeley districts.

Walker is home to Walker-Hackensack-Akeley High School and Immanuel Lutheran School.

== Transportation ==
Walker is served by the city-owned public-use Walker Airport (FAA LID: Y49), located four miles north-west of the city. Walker Airport contains one runway one designated 15/33 with a 3,220 x 75 ft (981 x 23 m) asphalt surface.

For the 12-month period ending July 31, 2017, the airport had 9,200 aircraft operations, an average of 25.2 per day: 48.9% general aviation and 51.1% transient general aviation. The airport housed 16 single-engine airplanes, 2 multi-engine airplanes, and 1 helicopter.

== Media ==
=== TV stations ===
Walker is part of the Minneapolis / Saint Paul television market.

Channel	Callsign	Affiliation	Branding	Subchannels		Owner
(Virtual)	Callsign	Affiliation	Branding	Channel	Programming	Owner
12.1	KCCW (WCCO Satellite)	CBS	WCCO 4	12.2	Start TV	CBS Corporation
21.1	K21HX-D	FOX	Fox 9	21.2; 21.3; 21.4	FOX 9+ Movies! Local	Leech Lake Television Corporation
24.1	K21HX-D	NBC	KARE 11	24.2; 24.3; 24.4	PBS (KAWE); Weather; ABC (KSAX)	Leech Lake Television Corporation
35.1	K35KH-D	CW	CW 23	35.2; 35.3; 35.4	Court TV; MeTV; 45TV	Leech Lake Television Corporation

== Newspaper ==
The Pilot Independent / Co-Pilot Shopper

=== Radio stations ===
FM radio

- 88.5 Minnesota Public Radio (MPR)
- 90.1 KOJB The Eagle, Native American
- 92.5 KXKK
- 94.5 KDLB
- 97.5 KDKK
- 99.1 KLLZ-FM Z99 Classic Rock
- 101.9 KQKK
- 102.5 KKWB-FM
- 104.3 KLKS

AM radio

- 820 WBKK-AM
- 870 KPRM
- 1070 KSKK
- 1570 KAKK

== Notable people ==
- Jimmy Darts, social media personality
- Mary Welsh Hemingway, journalist, wife of Ernest Hemingway
- Donald D. Lundrigan, Minnesota state representative and lawyer
- Noah W. Sawyer, Minnesota state representative
- Ber, Indie pop musician
