= Akeley, Minnesota =

City in Minnesota, United States

Akeley
- City
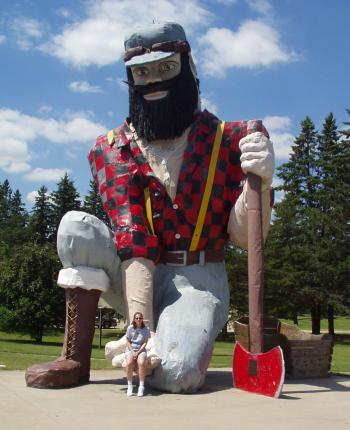
- Paul Bunyan and cradle
- Motto: "In The Heart Of Minnesota's Vacation And Recreational Area"
- Location of Akeley, Minnesota
- Coordinates: 47°0′6″N 94°43′41″W
- Country: United States
- State: Minnesota
- County: Hubbard

Area
  - Total: 1.49 sq mi (3.87 km^{2})
  - Land: 1.47 sq mi (3.80 km^{2})
  - Water: 0.027 sq mi (0.07 km^{2})
- Elevation: 1,430 ft (436 m)

Population (2020)
  - Total: 404
  - Density: 275.0/sq mi (106.19/km^{2})
- Time zone: UTC-6 (Central (CST))
  - Summer (DST): UTC-5 (CDT)
- ZIP code: 56433
- Area code: 218
- FIPS code: 27-00496
- GNIS feature ID: 0655094
- Website: www.akeleycity.com

Akeley (/ˈeɪkli/ AYK-lee) is a city in Hubbard County, Minnesota, United States. The population was 404 at the 2020 census.

== History ==
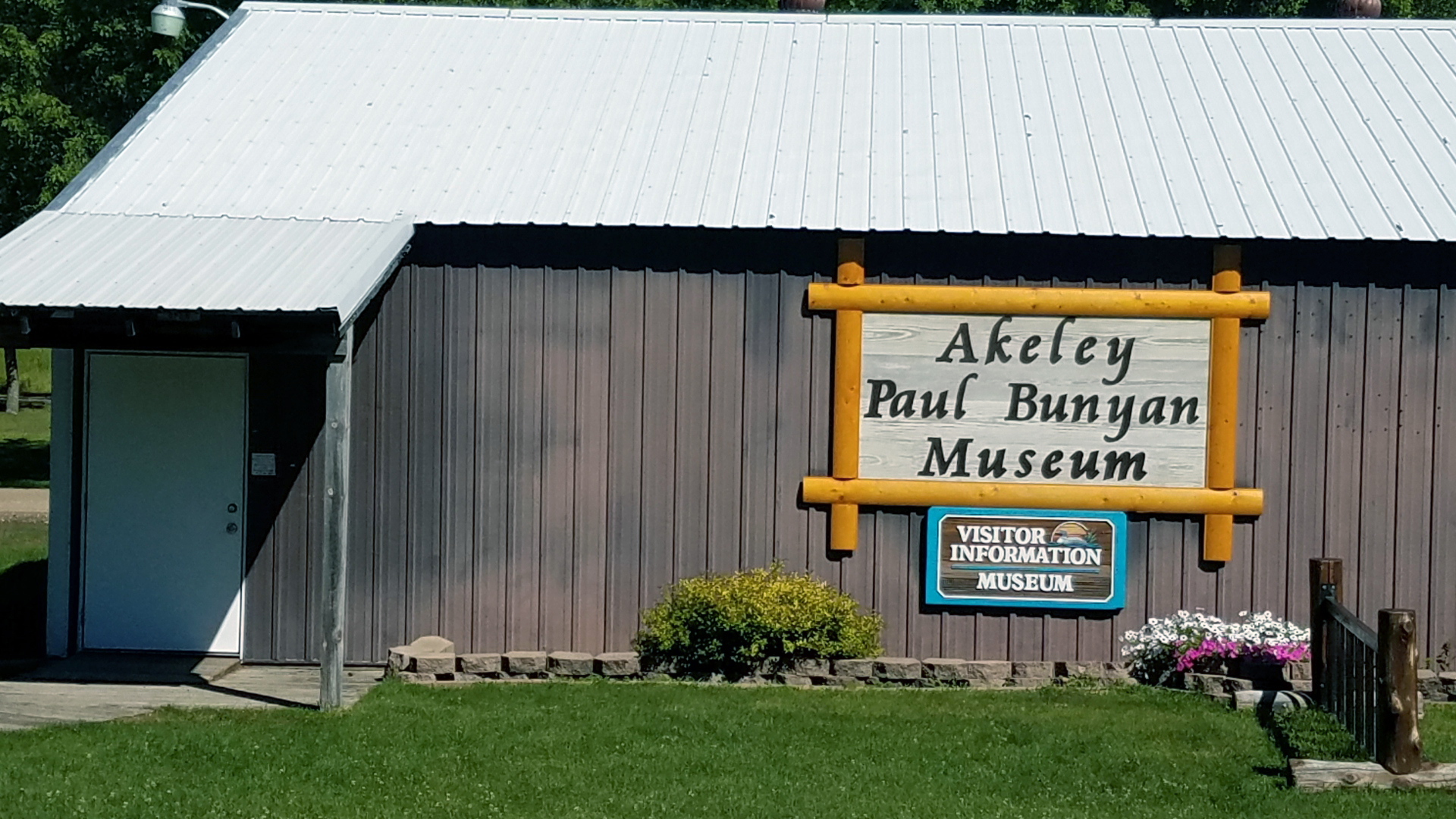
Akeley Paul Bunyan Historical Museum

The city of Akeley was incorporated on December 30, 1916. It was largely developed by a partnership between lumber magnate T. B. Walker and Healy C. Akeley, who formed the Red River Lumber Company in 1893. General settlement of Akeley began in 1895. After Walker built a sawmill in 1902, Akeley's development skyrocketed. The mill was once the largest in Minnesota. Walker had intended to build the mill in what later became Walker, Minnesota, but chose Akeley instead because of his wife's disapproval of the bars and brothels in the Walker area.

Because of the mill, and the train depot built in 1899, Akeley became a boomtown. Lumberjacks came and went on every freight train. The population swelled from 2,000 to over 3,500 between 1907 and 1908. Now the town has fewer than 500 residents.

== Geography ==
According to the United States Census Bureau, the city has an area of 1.50 square miles (3.88 km^{2}), of which 1.47 square miles (3.81 km^{2}) is land and 0.03 square miles (0.08 km^{2}) is water.

== Demographics ==
Historical population
Census	Pop.	Note	%±
1920	855		—
1930	514		−39.9%
1940	566		10.1%
1950	525		−7.2%
1960	434		−17.3%
1970	468		7.8%
1980	486		3.8%
1990	393		−19.1%
2000	412		4.8%
2010	432		4.9%
2020	404		−6.5%
U.S. Decennial Census; 2020 Census

=== 2010 census ===
As of the census of 2010, there were 432 people, 185 households, and 113 families residing in the city. The population density was 293.9 inhabitants per square mile (113.5/km^{2}). There were 242 housing units at an average density of 164.6 per square mile (63.6/km^{2}). The racial makeup of the city was 94.9% White, 0.2% African American, 2.1% Native American, 0.9% Asian, and 1.9% from two or more races. Hispanic or Latino of any race were 1.2% of the population.

There were 185 households, of which 27.6% had children under the age of 18 living with them, 36.2% were married couples living together, 13.0% had a female householder with no husband present, 11.9% had a male householder with no wife present, and 38.9% were non-families. 28.6% of all households were made up of individuals, and 16.2% had someone living alone who was 65 years of age or older. The average household size was 2.34 and the average family size was 2.85.

The median age in the city was 41 years. 23.6% of residents were under the age of 18; 7.6% were between the ages of 18 and 24; 22.9% were from 25 to 44; 29% were from 45 to 64; and 16.9% were 65 years of age or older. The gender makeup of the city was 51.4% male and 48.6% female.

=== 2000 census ===
As of the census of 2000, there were 412 people, 179 households, and 119 families residing in the city. The population density was 277.7 inhabitants per square mile (107.2/km^{2}). There were 234 housing units at an average density of 157.7 per square mile (60.9/km^{2}). The racial makeup of the city was 96.60% White, 2.67% Native American, 0.49% Asian, 0.24% from other races. Hispanic or Latino of any race were 1.21% of the population. 47.4% were of German, 13.5% Norwegian, 6.2% French, 5.9% Irish, 5.3% Finnish and 5.3% Swedish.

There were 179 households, of which 27.9% had children under the age of 18 living with them, 40.8% were married couples living together, 16.8% had a female householder with no husband present, and 33.0% were non-families. 27.9% of all households was made up of individuals, and 13.4% had someone living alone who was 65 years of age or older. The average household size was 2.30 and the average family size was 2.65.

In the city, the population was spread out, with 26.0% under the age of 18, 7.3% from 18 to 24, 28.2% from 25 to 44, 22.3% from 45 to 64, and 16.3% who were 65 years of age or older. The median age was 37 years. For every 100 females, there were 86.4 males. For every 100 females age 18 and over, there were 93.0 males.

The median income for a household in the city was $26,719, and the median income for a family was $33,611. Males had a median income of $26,023 versus $19,063 for females. About 17.2% of families and 17.5% of the population were below the poverty line, including 27.8% of those under age 18 and 14.5% of those age 65 or over.

== Arts and culture ==
=== Annual cultural events ===
Akeley has been celebrating "Paul Bunyan Days" since 1955, and has a 25-foot (7.6 m) tall statue of a kneeling Paul Bunyan next to a giant cradle. Akeley is also home to the Paul Bunyan Historical Museum.

=== Museums and other points of interest ===
The Akeley Paul Bunyan Historical Museum opened in 1984 and contains a collection of pictures and artifacts detailing the community's early history.

== Parks and recreation ==
The Heartland State Trail is 49 miles long and connects the communities of Park Rapids, Dorset, Nevis, Akeley, Walker, and Cass Lake. An alternative trail runs alongside the paved trail for horseback riding and snowmobile runs.

== Education ==
Akeley Public Schools are part of the Walker-Hackensack-Akeley School District. Schools in the district include Walker-Hackensack-Akeley Elementary School and Walker-Hackensack-Akeley High School (WHA). The Walker-Hackensack-Akeley district was formed by the 1990 consolidation of the Walker and Akeley districts.

Mary Donohue Stetz is the Superintendent of Schools.

== Infrastructure ==
=== Transportation ===
Minnesota State Highways 34 and 64 are two of the main arterial routes in the community.

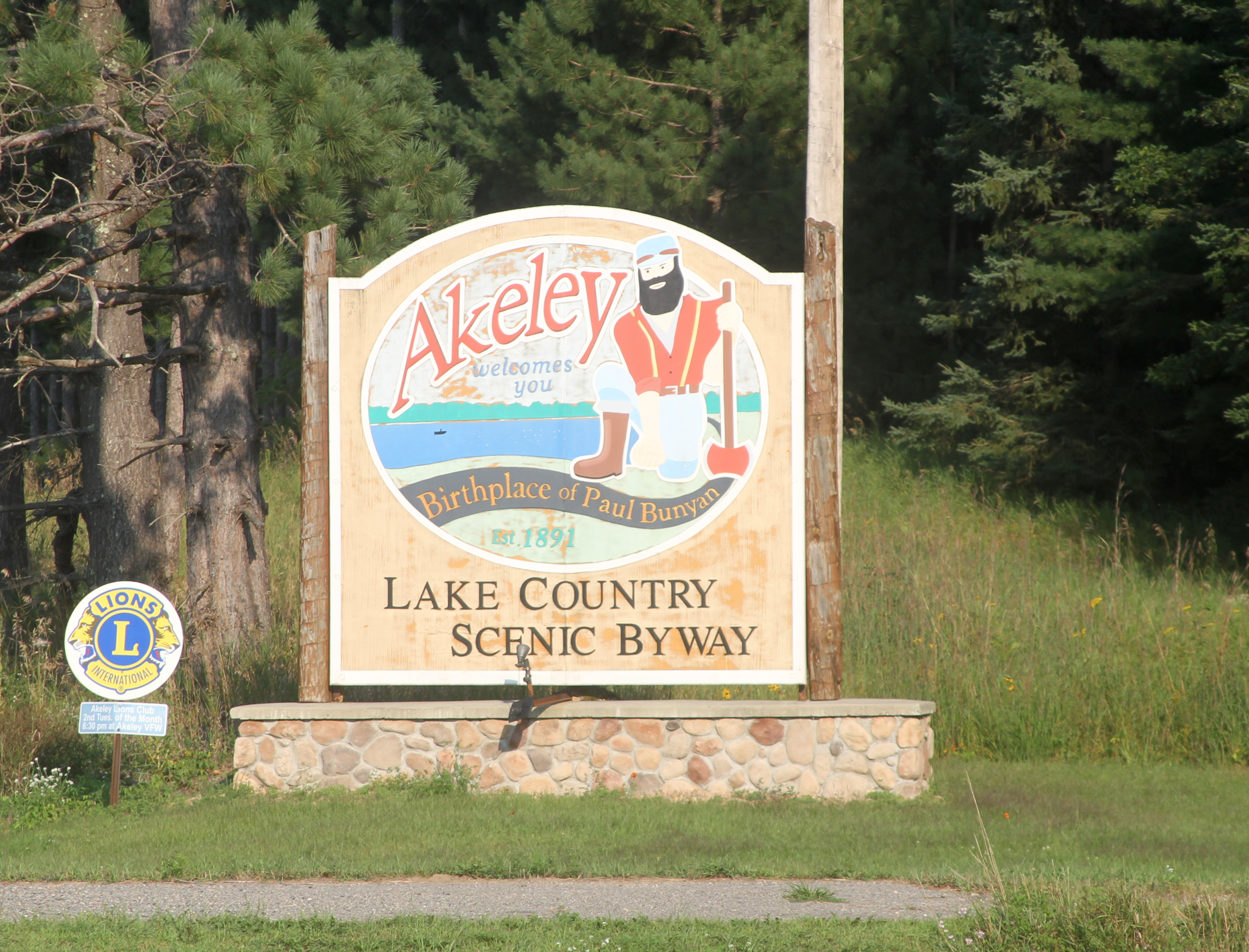
Welcome sign

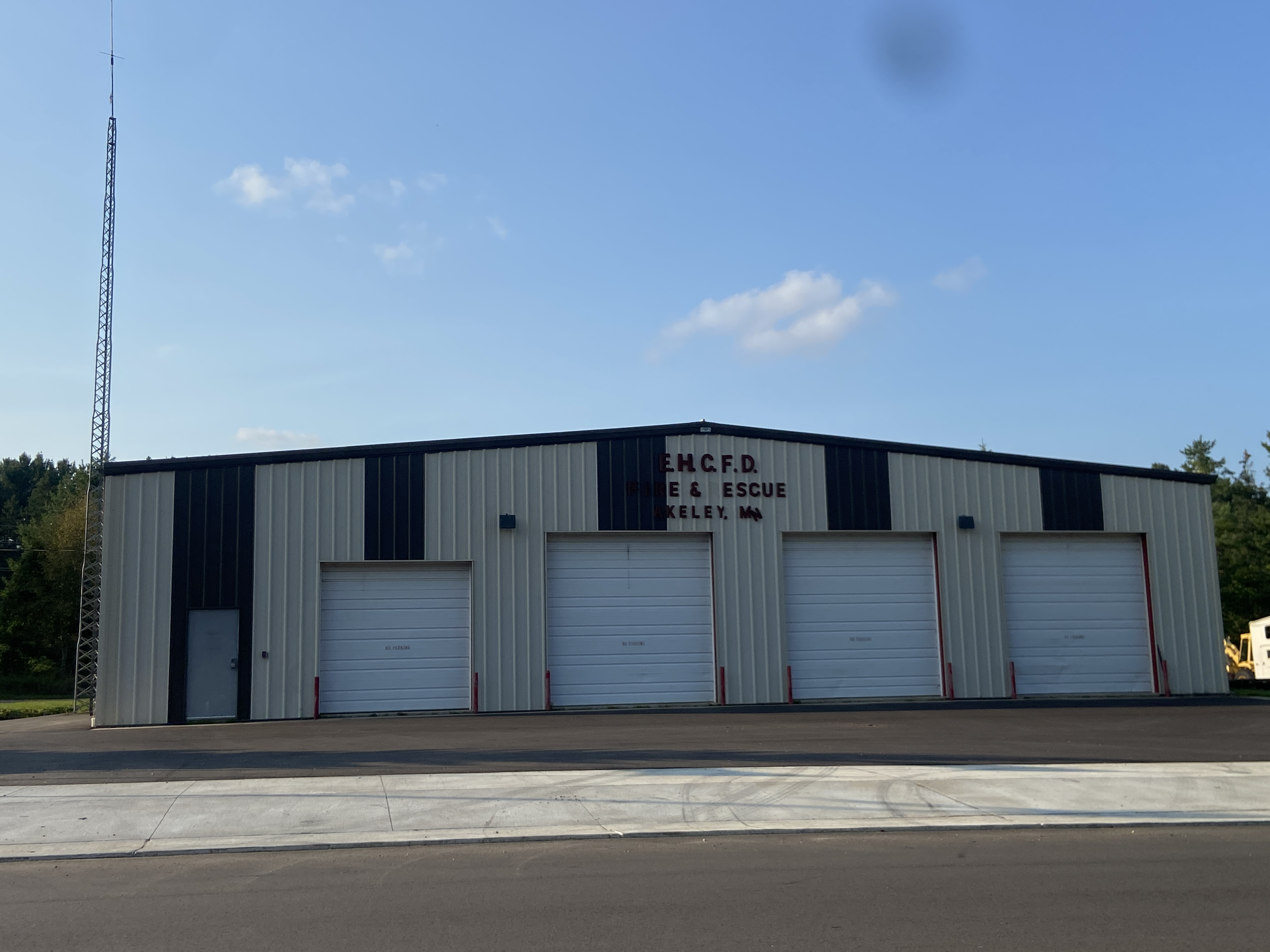
Fire department

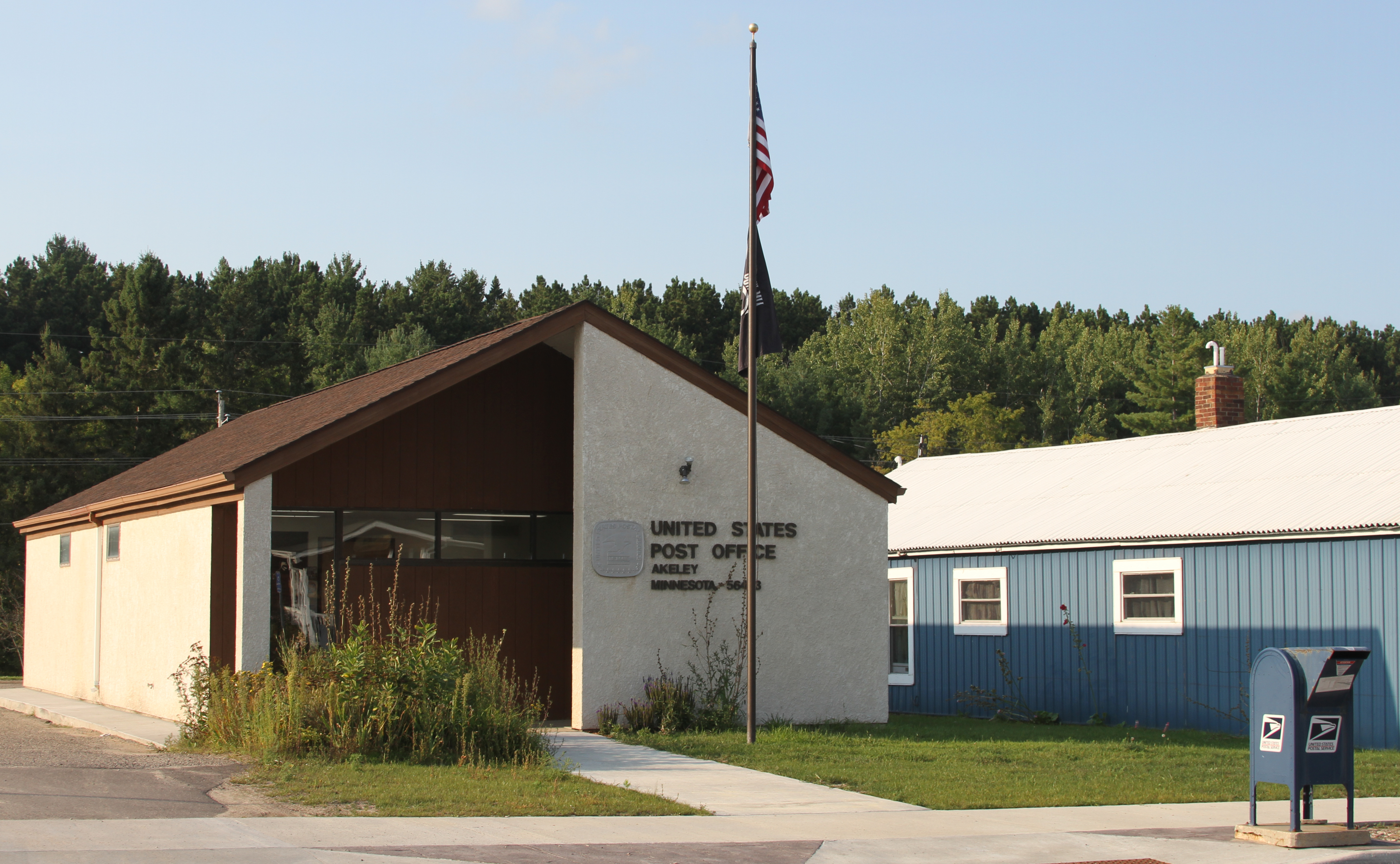
Post Office

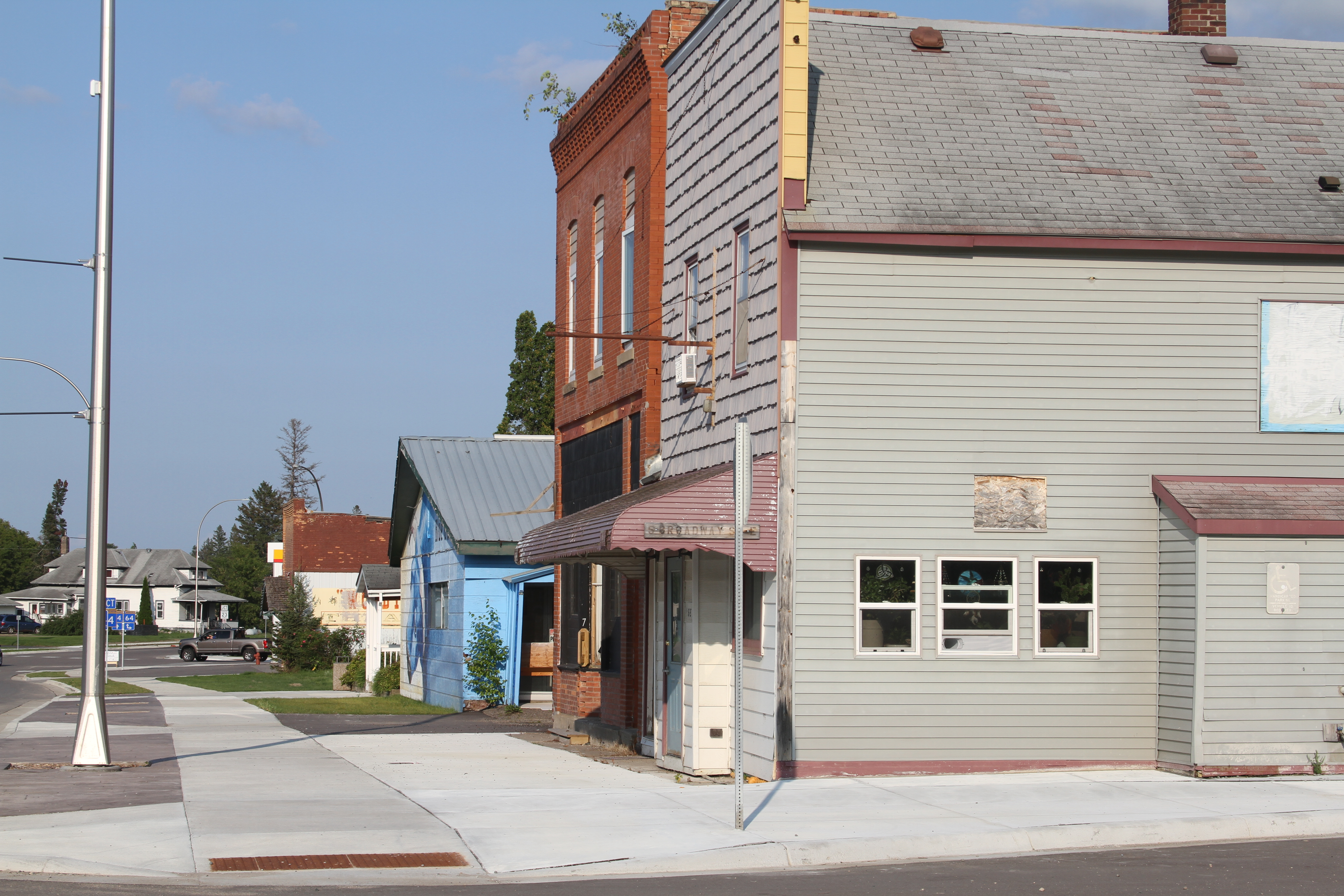
Lake County Scenic Byway at Graceson Avenue, south side

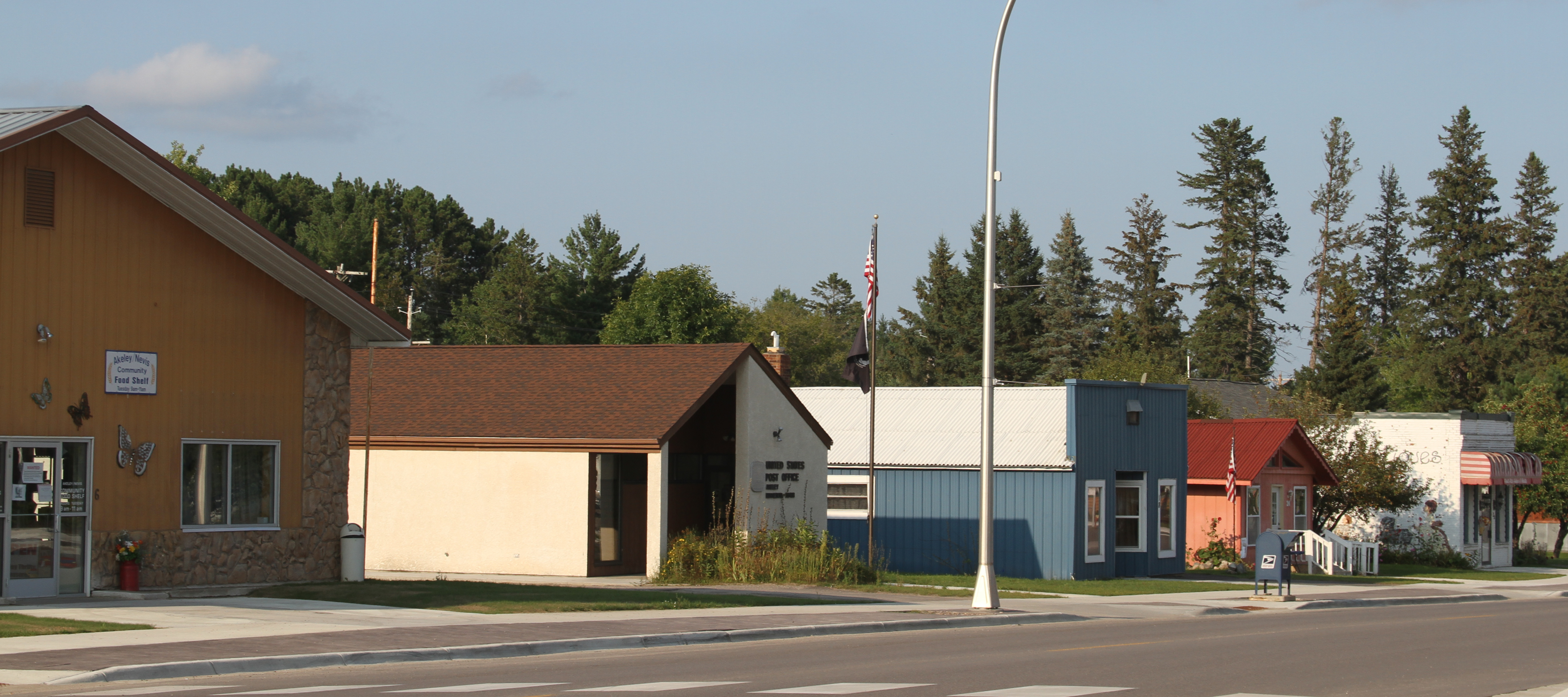
Lake County Scenic Byway at Graceson Avenue, north side

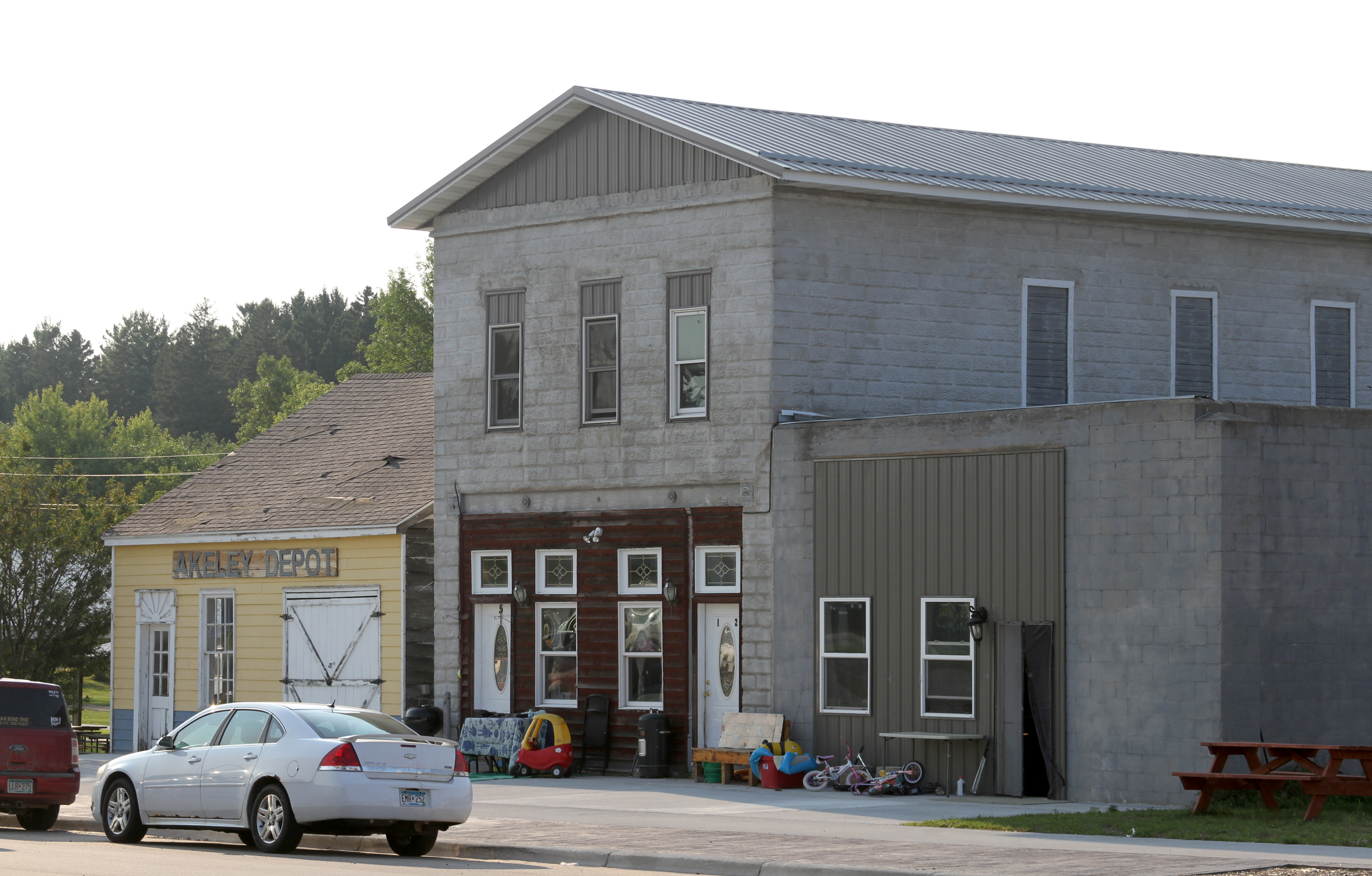
Lake County Scenic Byway at Hulet Avenue
