= Noah W. Sawyer =

American politician and educator

Noah W. Sawyer (December 2, 1877 – January 24, 1957) was an American educator and politician.

Sawyer was born on a farm in Iowa and attended Iowa public schools and college. In 1912, Sawyer moved to a farm with his wife and family near Hackensack, Cass County, Minnesota. He lived in Walker, Minnesota with his wife and family, was the Cass County Superintendent of Schools and taught school. Sawyer served in the Minnesota House of Representatives from 1939 to 1945.
