= Josh Liljenquist =

American social media personality and philanthropist (born 1997)

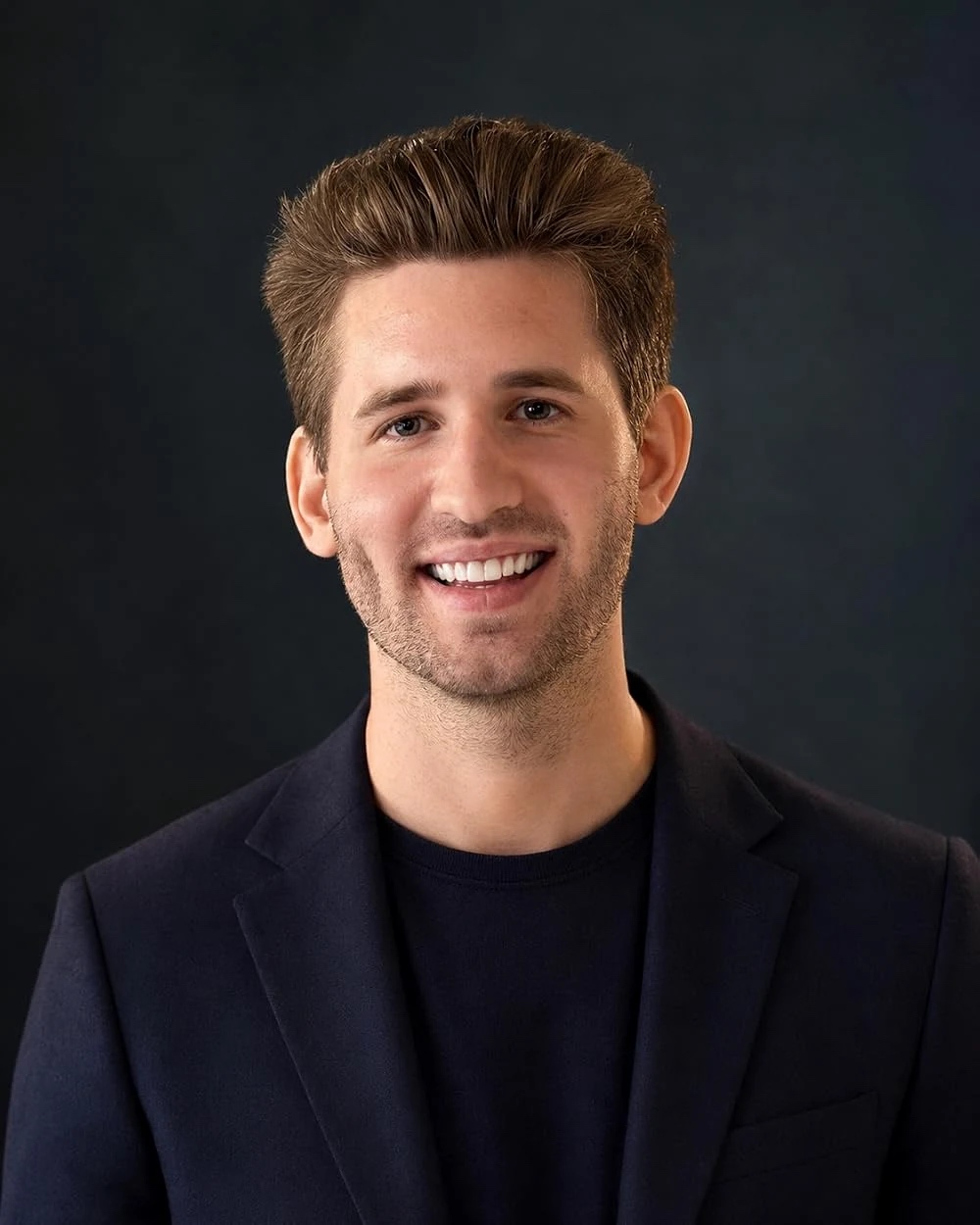
- Liljenquist in 2025
- Born: 1997 (age 28–29); Fairmont, Minnesota
- Relatives: Julie (mother); Trent (father); Jacob (brother)

Instagram information
- Page: joshlilj
- Genre: Philanthropy
- Followers: 6.7 Million (July 2026)

TikTok information
- Page: Joshlilj
- Years active: 2019-Present
- Genre: Philanthropy
- Followers: 11.3 Million (July 2026)

YouTube information
- Channel: Joshlilj
- Years active: 2022-Present
- Genre: Philanthropy
- Subscribers: 4.23 Million (July 2026)
- Views: 2.644 Billion (July 2026)
- Website: https://joshliljenquist.com/

Josh Liljenquist (born 1997) is a social media personality and philanthropist based in Minnesota.

== Early life ==
Josh Liljenquist was born in Fairmont, Minnesota in 1997, to Julie and Trent Liljenquist. He graduated from Fairmont Junior/Senior High School. He attended Minnesota State University, Mankato for a bachelor's degree in communication. After college, he moved to Chaska, Minnesota.

Liljenquist's mother is a real estate agent who has participated in some of his charitable acts.

== Career ==
Liljenquist began his social media career in 2019. His first successful video was him throwing a snowball at his father. His philanthropy began shortly after, giving out $5 gift cards to the homeless. His initial success allowed him to fund larger giveaways. He would become known as a "kindness influencer".

During the George Floyd protests of 2020, he posted history videos on the topic of racial justice, such as the wrongful execution of George Stinney. In 2023, Liljenquist collaborated with the Minneapolis restaurant Lotus to cook food for the homeless. The subsequent video about this collaboration, which gained 12 million views on TikTok, resulted in the restaurant having a surge in customers.

In 2024, Liljenquist partnered with Starkey Hearing Technologies to provide hearing aids to a man. By that year, it was estimated he had given away $100,000 worth of goods. Around this time, Liljenquist began receiving criticism that his content was profiting off of the misfortune of others, and taking advantage of the subjects of some of his videos. Liljenquist responded by claiming that he makes it obvious while filming that he is recording, so that nobody appears in his content that does not want to be. His content has been described as "ethically questionable" by the Star Tribune.

In 2025, Liljenquist collaborated with Minnesota Vikings quarterback J. J. McCarthy to hand out pizzas, heaters, tents, jackets, and blankets to homeless people. In 2026, he used the phrase "Live to Love" to describe the mission behind his social media.

=== Ban from St. Paul public parks ===
In April of 2026, Liljenquist received a six-month ban from all public parks in St. Paul, Minnesota after the city alleged he was attempting to “harass, record and profit from vulnerable adults” at an encampment near Pig's Eye Lake. City officials also claimed he was planning an unlicensed event, which Liljenquist denies. The ban was rescinded about two weeks later. He has since said that he is working to improve what happens "after the video".

== See also ==
- Jimmy Darts
- MrBeast
- Random acts of kindness
