= Walker-Hackensack-Akeley High School =

Location
- 301 4th St; Walker, Minnesota; 56484; United States
- Coordinates: 47°5′53″N 94°34′46″W

Information
- Type: Public high school
- School district: Walker-Hackensack-Akeley School District
- Principal: Ryan Jensen
- Staff: 46
- Grades: 7 to 12
- Enrollment: 300 (2023–2024)
- Colors: Blue and Silver
- Mascot: Wolf
- Nickname: WHA
- Website: https://hs.wha.k12.mn.us/

Walker-Hackensack-Akeley High School (WHA) is a public high school located in Walker, Minnesota, United States. It is part of Walker-Hackensack-Akeley School District. Students come from Walker, Hackensack, Akeley, Onigum, and Laporte, Minnesota.

The school offers honors classes as well as Post Secondary Enrollment Options. PSEO is a Minnesota Department of Education program that allows qualifying high school juniors and seniors to take college classes for high school credit at no cost to the student. Foreign languages at WHA include Spanish for grades 9 through 12 and German, although being phased out, for eleventh and twelfth grades.

== Athletics ==
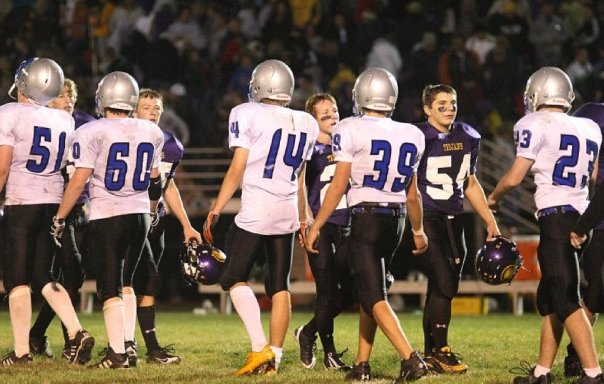
The school's 2008 football team

The school has football, volleyball, girls and boys soccer, girls and boys basketball, wrestling, hockey, baseball, softball, boys and girls golf, boys and girls track, and cheerleading teams.

== Speech ==
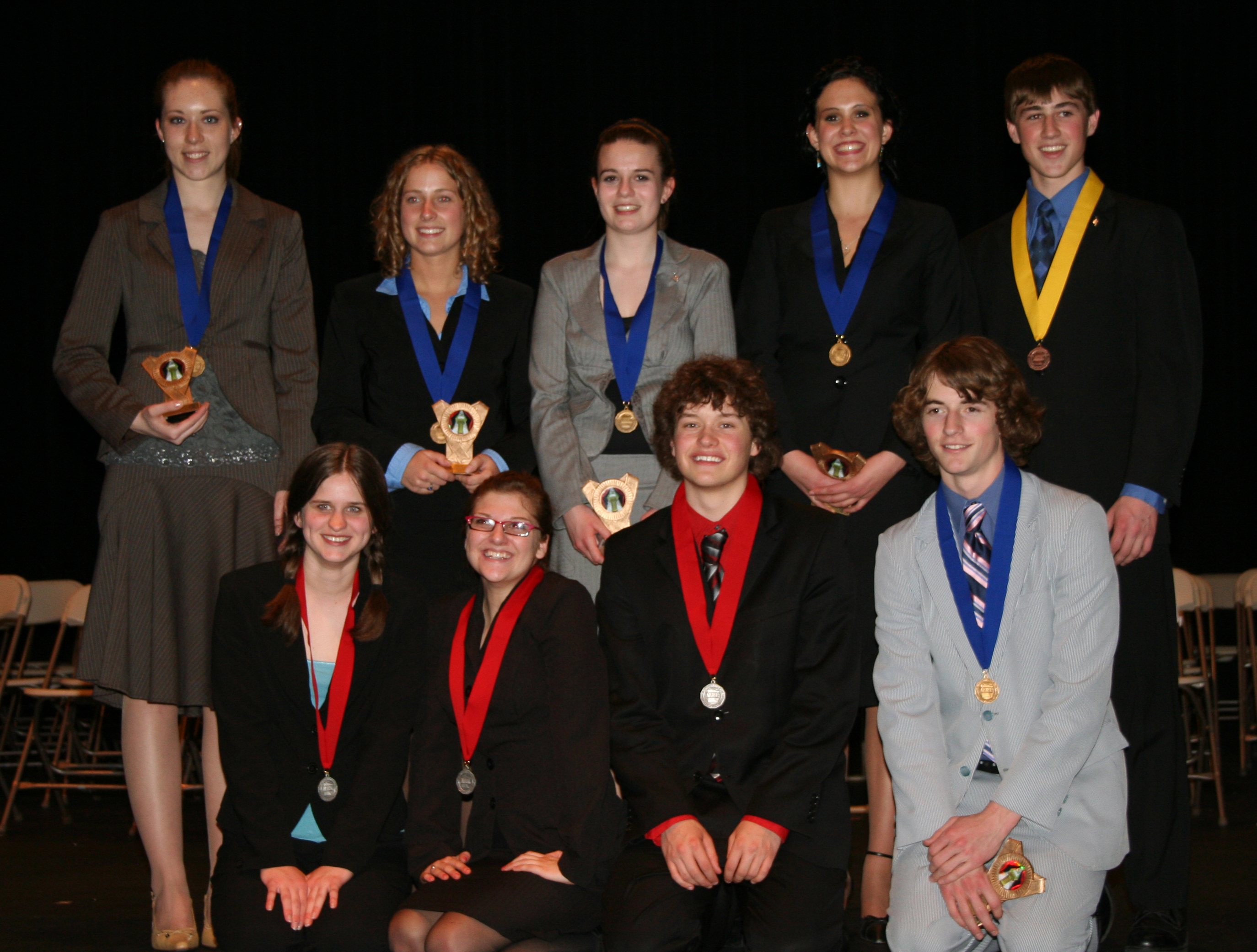
9 of the 17 2007 National Forensic League State Medalists

The WHA speech team has competed for 44 years. In those 44 years, participants have earned 209 state speech medals, 39 state championships, and speakers have competed 32 times on the national level.

WHA has a number of National Forensic League Academic All-Americans.

At the 2007 state tournament, the WHA speech team had a record five state champions. The WHA team also had a record number of state medals with 17 total medals in 2007. In 2008, the WHA speech team won the section tournament for the 17th consecutive year.

At the 2008 NFL National Qualifying tournament, a record six speakers qualified for the NFL National Tournament in Las Vegas, Nevada in June 2008.

In the 2010 speech season, WHA won sections for the 20th year in a row.

== Theater ==
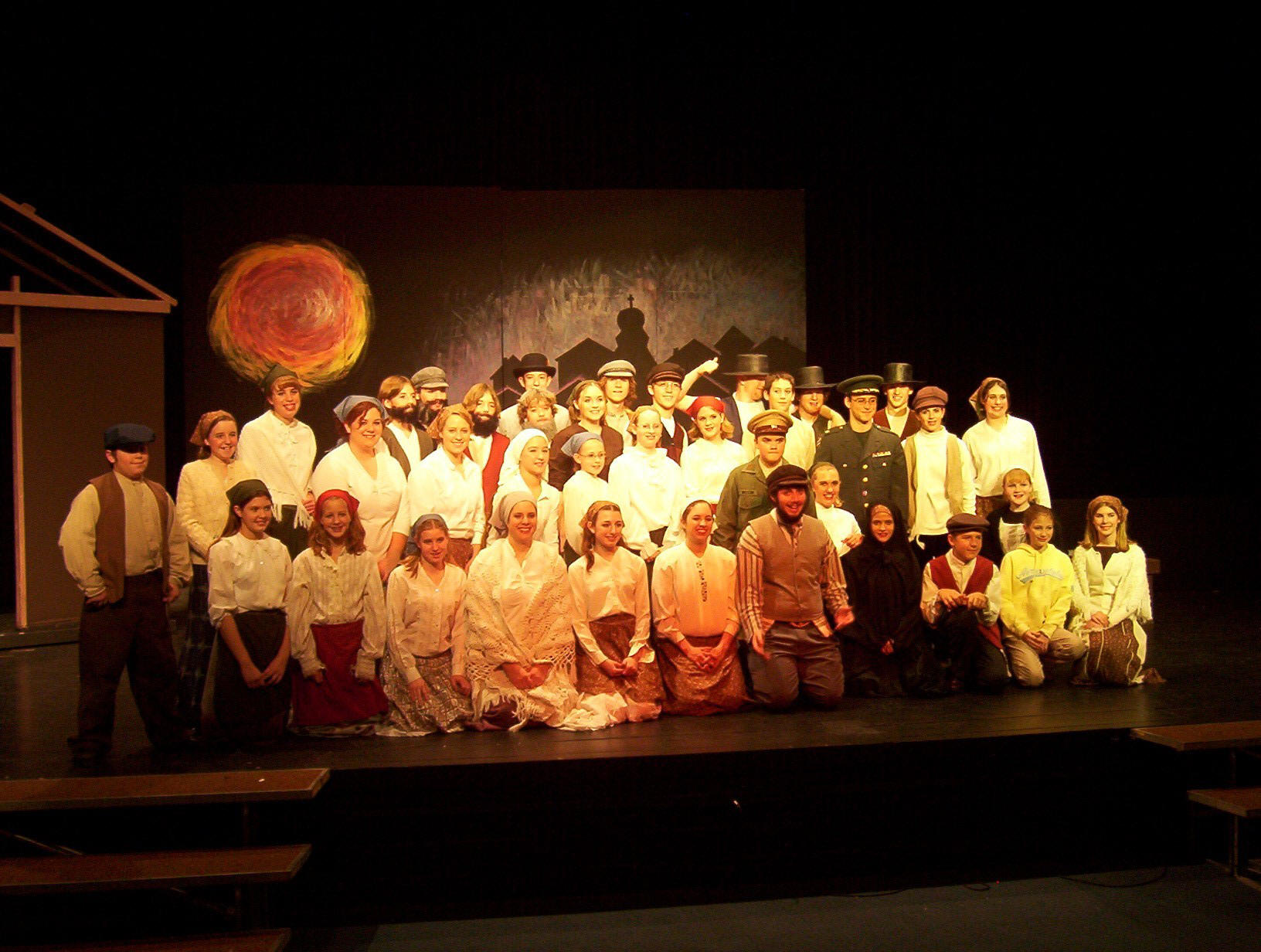
Fiddler on the Roof Cast

WHA has a theater department, which as performed plays including:

- Fiddler on the Roof (2003)
- Annie (2005)
- Seussical (2006)
- Peter Pan (2007)
- The Sound of Music (2008)

== Music ==
WHA's music department consists of a concert band, stage band, and concert choir who each perform a winter and spring concert every year. They also compete in a fall solo contest and spring ensemble contest.
