= Cass County Museum =

County museum in Walker, Minnesota

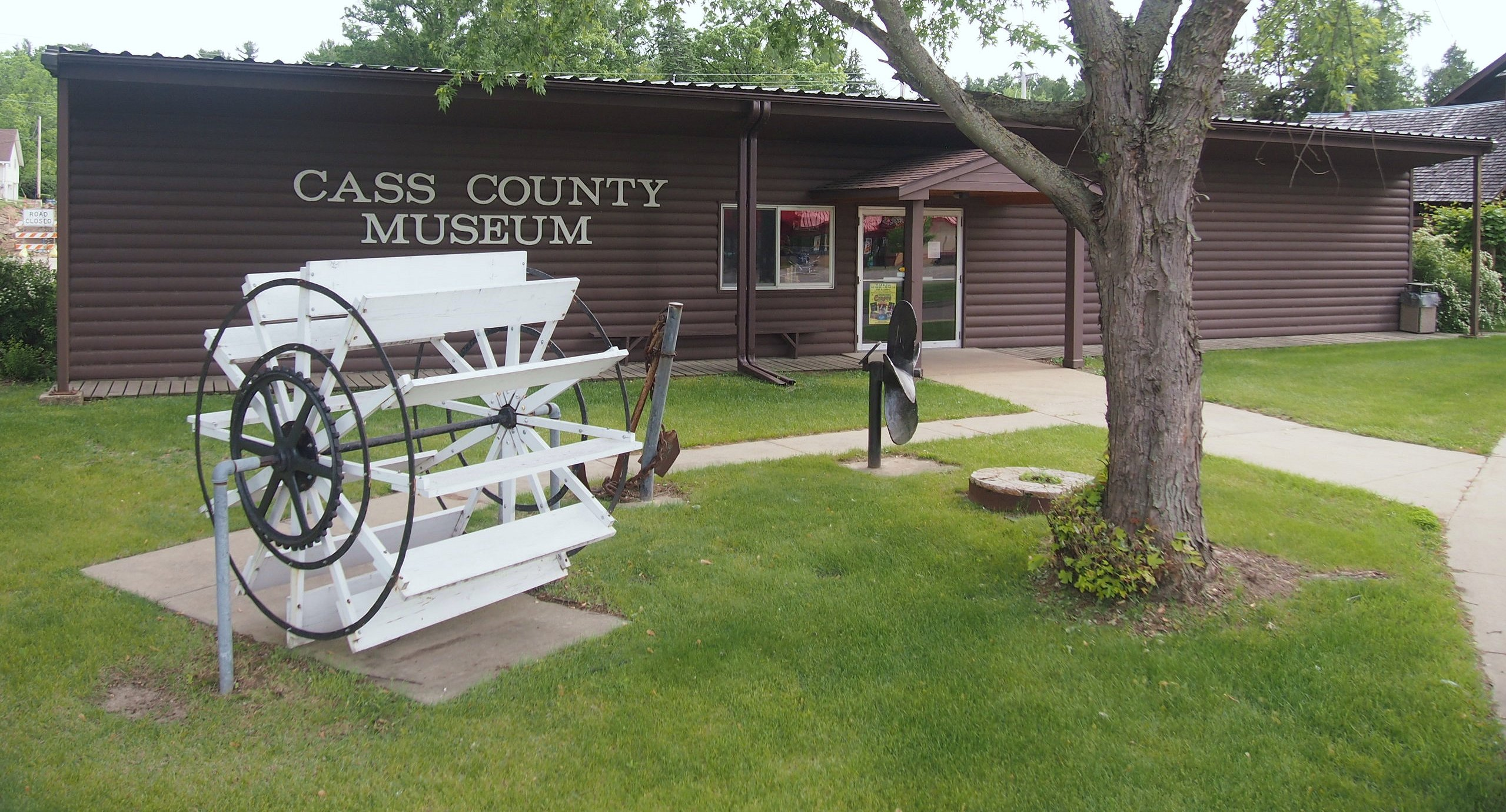
- Exterior of museum
- Established: 1982
- Location: 201 Minnesota Ave W, Walker, Minnesota 56484 United States
- Coordinates: 47°6′5″N 94°34′40″W
- Type: Local history
- Executive director: Renee Geving
- Website: casscountymuseum.org

The Cass County Museum is a local history museum in Walker, Minnesota, United States. Operated by Cass County Historical Society, the museum and research center serves as a center for preserving and sharing the history of Cass County and its connection to Minnesota's wider history.

In April 1949, the Cass County Historical Society was organized with officers and directors. The society was reorganized in 1956. The Cass County Museum was dedicated in June 1982.

== Collections and exhibits ==
The museum holds a broad collection related to the history of the county. It features extensive exhibits on the Ojibwe people, reflecting the relationship between the museum and the Leech Lake Indian Reservation. Exhibits include cultural practices such as canoe building, maple sap harvesting, and wild rice gathering. The museum also features displays on early European settlers, fur traders, and lumbering activities that shaped the region.

== Huset School ==
The Huset School, a historic schoolhouse built in 1912, was moved to the grounds of the Cass County Museum in 1968. It provides a hands-on experience representing country school life from the early 20th century with period furniture and tools. Other displays cover pioneer tools and trades such as blacksmithing, coopering, cobbling, wheelwright work, and carpentry. Logging artifacts and early photographs document the county's forest industry.

== Research and resources ==
The museum includes a research center with archives of county newspapers dating back to the 1890s, obituaries, village histories, and family histories. It provides access to records like postmaster lists, early divorces, cemetery data, and local historical publications.
