= Kenneth E. Scott (politician) =

American politician (1928–2025)

Member of the Minnesota House of Representatives from the 10th district
- In office 1963–1966

Personal details
- Born: Kenneth Edward Scott; October 13, 1928 Fairmont, Minnesota, U.S.
- Died: January 10, 2025 (aged 96) Fairmont, Minnesota, U.S.
- Party: Independent
- Education: William Mitchell College of Law

Kenneth Edward Scott (October 13, 1928 – January 10, 2025) was an American politician. An independent, he served in the Minnesota House of Representatives from 1963 to 1966.

== Life and career ==
Scott was born in Fairmont, Minnesota, the son of Kenneth Scott Sr. and Marian Weiss. He attended Fairmont High School, graduating in 1946. After graduating, he attended William Mitchell College of Law, earning his law degree in 1959, which after earning his degree, he worked as a lawyer.

Scott served in the Minnesota House of Representatives from 1963 to 1966.

== Death ==
Scott died at his home in Fairmont, Minnesota, on January 10, 2025, at the age of 96.
