= Jimmy Darts =

American social media personality

- Born: Jimmy Kellogg; February 28, 1996 (age 30); Walker, Minnesota, U.S.
- Occupations: Social media personality and philanthropist

TikTok information
- Page: Jimmy Darts
- Followers: 13 million

YouTube information
- Channel: Jimmy Darts
- Subscribers: 4.4 million
- Views: 1.64 billion
- Last updated: 12 October 2025
- Website: jimmydarts.com

Jimmy Kellogg is an American social media personality and philanthropist known professionally as Jimmy Darts. He posts random acts of kindness videos, often via TikTok and YouTube.

Darts is from Walker, Minnesota. As a teenager, he posted videos on YouTube, eventually amassing 18,000 subscribers before he stopped. After watching a Billy Graham video, he became a Christian. He went to a capitalism conference and learned how to operate an Amazon business.

Darts posts videos on TikTok. In 2020, Darts was in season 2 of the gameshow Holey Moley. Darts posts random acts of kindness videos. He surprises people in need of money raised through donations from his followers. In one instance, Darts assisted a homeless man get off the streets.

== See also ==
- Josh Liljenquist
- Random acts of kindness
