= CJ Arthur =

American Educator (born 1973)

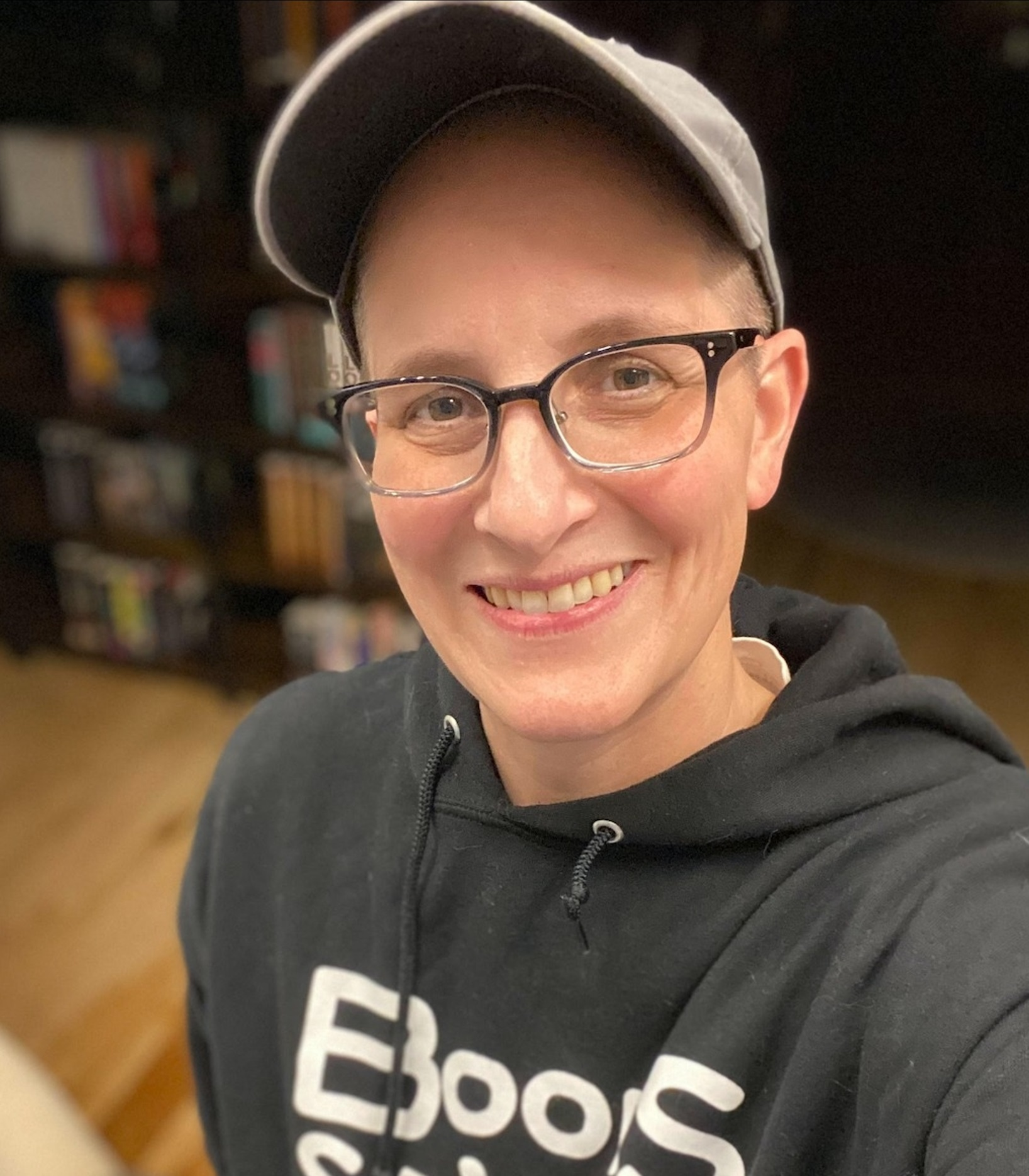
- Arthur in 2024
- Born: 17 December 1973 (age 52); Minneapolis, Minnesota
- Occupations: Owner of WordHaven BookHouse, LLC; Equity 2.0 Consultant; Educator; Speaker; & Writer
- Awards: 2025 Bookseller of the Year; 2018/2019 Minnesota Teacher of the Year; 2018 Minnesota Women Breaking Barriers Winter Honoree; 2019 Minnesota Lynx Women’s Spotlight Selection for Leader and Innovator in Arts and Education; 2019 Minnesota Women’s Press Favorite Leader in Education

CJ Arthur (born 17 December 1973) is the owner of WordHaven BookHouse, LLC, (Book Shop & Writing Center) in Sheboygan, Wisconsin. They are also the owner of WordHaven Ignites Consulting and the producer/host of the WordHaven Activates Podcast. They were formerly an English teacher at Tokata Learning Center, an alternative high school in Shakopee, Minnesota, and an adjunct professor at Augsburg University. They were named the 2018/2019 Minnesota Teacher of the Year by Education Minnesota.

== Biography ==
=== Early life ===
Arthur is a native of Fairmont, Minnesota, graduating from Fairmont Public Schools in 1992. Among other influential teachers, Arthur credits Paula Thiede, their fifth-grade teacher at Lincoln Elementary School, for making them feel like they mattered, that they were intelligent and were loved.

=== Education ===
After receiving a Bachelor of Arts degree in Communications from the University of Massachusetts, they worked at print and television media outlets before providing case management for students who dropped out of high school. They received their Communication Arts & Literature teaching license in 2007 and their Master of Arts in education in 2011, both from Augsburg University in Minneapolis, Minnesota.

=== Career as an educator ===
Arthur taught Communication Arts & English Literature courses, advised Gender Sexuality Alliances, and facilitated Link Crew Programs at Chaska High School in Chaska, Minnesota, and St. Anthony Village High School in St. Anthony, Minnesota, before becoming a teacher at the Tokata Learning Center. There they taught Communication Arts & English Literature courses to students between 9th and 12th grade, was a Curriculum Writer for the Success for the Future Grant, and was the advisor for the MAAP Stars student leadership program. Tokata Learning Center is an alternative high school that serves 9th to 12th grade in Shakopee and surrounding areas. In their Teacher of the Year application, Arthur wrote this about their students at Tokata: "It is true that our population can consist of students with varying abilities and temperaments, but these same students are also some of the most creative and brilliant humans with whom I have ever worked. And, without fail, the students who arrive angry, sad, hurt, and/or scared reveal their vulnerability, brilliance, and beautiful selves when they feel safe and valued." One year after being named Minnesota Teacher of the Year, Arthur shifted to training teachers and teachers-in-training (among other adults).

Arthur began their Equity Consulting business in 2018. They work with schools, nonprofits, and businesses to increase their inclusivity and compassionate accountability.

On July 8, 2019, OutFront Minnesota announced Arthur had been hired as the LGBTQIAP2S+ civil rights group's Director of Educational Equity. On June 26, 2020, Arthur resigned from OutFront MN.

Arthur was an adjunct education professor at Augsburg University from September 2020 - May 2021.

Arthur's Independent BookShop and Writing Center, WordHaven BookHouse, opened on 4/30/22 in Sheboygan, WI.

=== Teacher of the Year ===
In the Fall of 2017 Arthur was nominated by Shakopee Public Schools professional learning coordinator Annie Rients and Tokata Learning Center principal Eric Serbus for Education Minnesota's Minnesota Teacher of the Year award, one of 167 candidates nominated across the state. They were among 43 semifinalists and 12 finalists. They were named Minnesota Teacher of the Year on May 6, 2018. Arthur is the first out Queer individual to be named Minnesota Teacher of the Year and only the second Alternative Educator. They are the 54th recipient of the award and the first (and only) from the Shakopee district.

In one of Arthur's responses posed by the Education Minnesota panel, they explained their teaching practice: "I chose to be a teacher at a non-traditional age. Ten years later, my teaching practice still strongly matches this philosophy: teaching individuals to effectively solve problems, allowing students to learn by doing, giving students an active role in the learning process, valuing the process of learning more than the outcome, respecting the whole of the child and creating a ‘community of learners’ – as opposed to a collection of discrete individuals."

As the 2018 award winner, in 2019 Arthur was Minnesota's representative for the National Teacher of the Year program in Washington, D.C. They chose not to attend to protest the policies of President Donald Trump, saying those policies frequently hurt their students who face discrimination.

Arthur chose to kneel during the national anthem at the NCAA football championship game on January 13, 2020 as a way to support the BLM movement and to advocate for people with identities that are historically marginalized and oppressed. Arthur explained their reasons for kneeling in an article published in The Independent and in their TED-Ed Talk.

Arthur was named 2025 Bookseller of the Year by Midwest Booksellers Association (MIBA) on 5/13/25 in Mineral Point, Wisconsin. '

== Awards ==
- 2025 Bookseller of the Year
- 2018/2019 Minnesota Teacher of the Year
- 2018 Minnesota Women Breaking Barriers Winter Honoree
- 2019 MN Lynx Women's Spotlight Selection for Leader and Innovator in Arts and Education
- 2019 MN Women's Press Favorite Leader in Education
