= Hackensack, Minnesota =

City in Minnesota, United States

Hackensack
- City
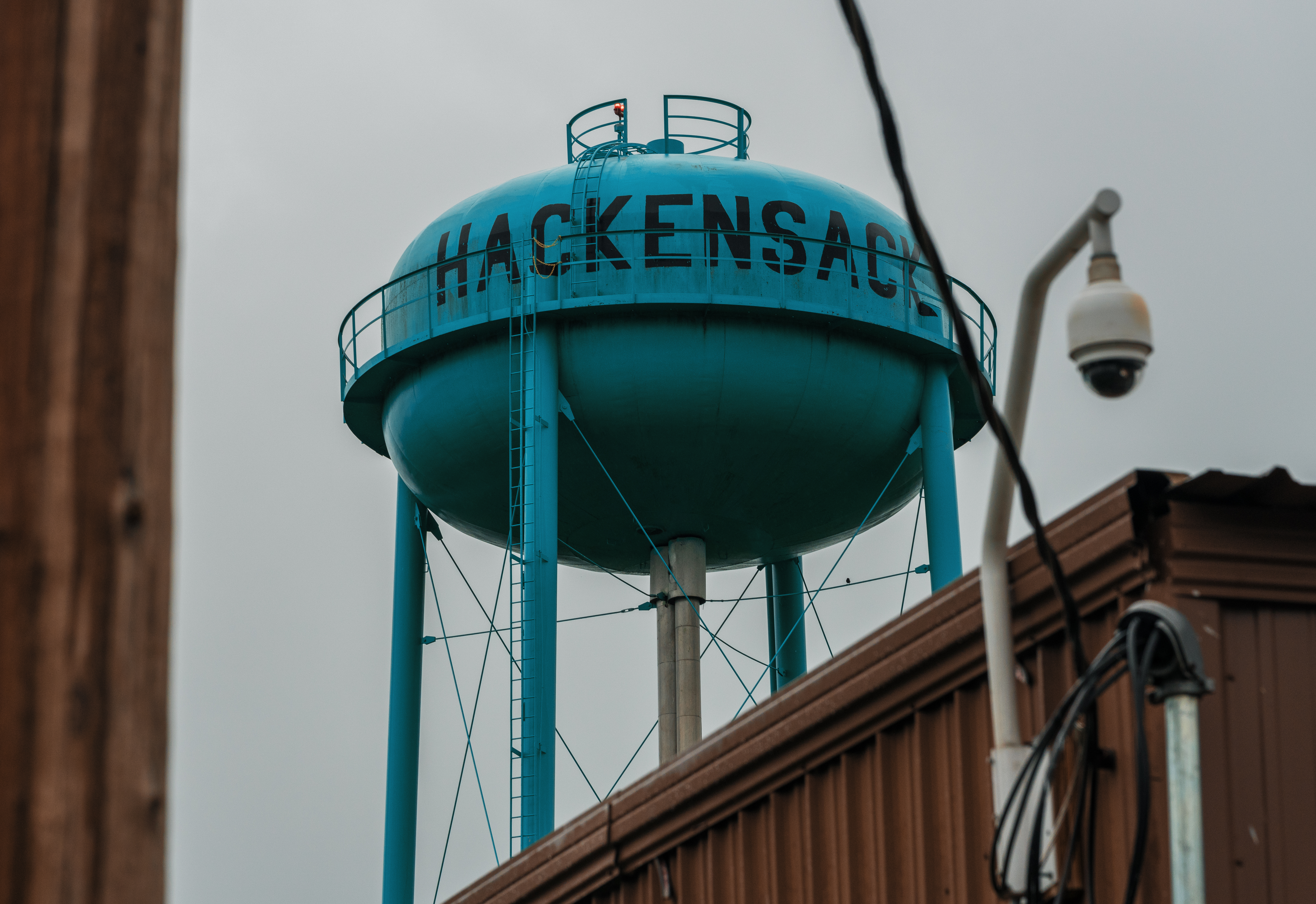
- Water tower
- Nickname: "Home of Paul Bunyan's Sweetheart"
- Location of Hackensack within Cass County, Minnesota
- Coordinates: 46°55′36″N 94°31′32″W
- Country: United States
- State: Minnesota
- County: Cass

Area
  - Total: 1.03 sq mi (2.67 km^{2})
  - Land: 1.02 sq mi (2.64 km^{2})
  - Water: 0.0077 sq mi (0.02 km^{2})
- Elevation: 1,371 ft (418 m)

Population (2020)
  - Total: 294
  - Density: 287.9/sq mi (111.16/km^{2})
- Time zone: UTC-6 (Central (CST))
  - Summer (DST): UTC-5 (CDT)
- ZIP code: 56452
- Area code: 218
- FIPS code: 27-26378
- GNIS feature ID: 2394264
- Website: https://cityofhackensackmn.gov/

Hackensack is a city in Cass County, Minnesota, United States. The population was 294 at the 2020 census. It is part of the Brainerd Micropolitan Statistical Area.

== History ==
A post office called Hackensack has been in operation since 1888. The city is named after Hackensack, New Jersey.

The residents of Hackensack first described their town as the home of Paul Bunyan's sweetheart Lucette in the 1940s, when a sculpture depicting her was placed in City Park. A seventeen-foot-tall fiberglass sculpture of Lucette replaced the original in 1991.

In 2023, the Hackensack Lending Library, officially listed as the Hackensack Conservation Building, was added to the National Register of Historic Places.

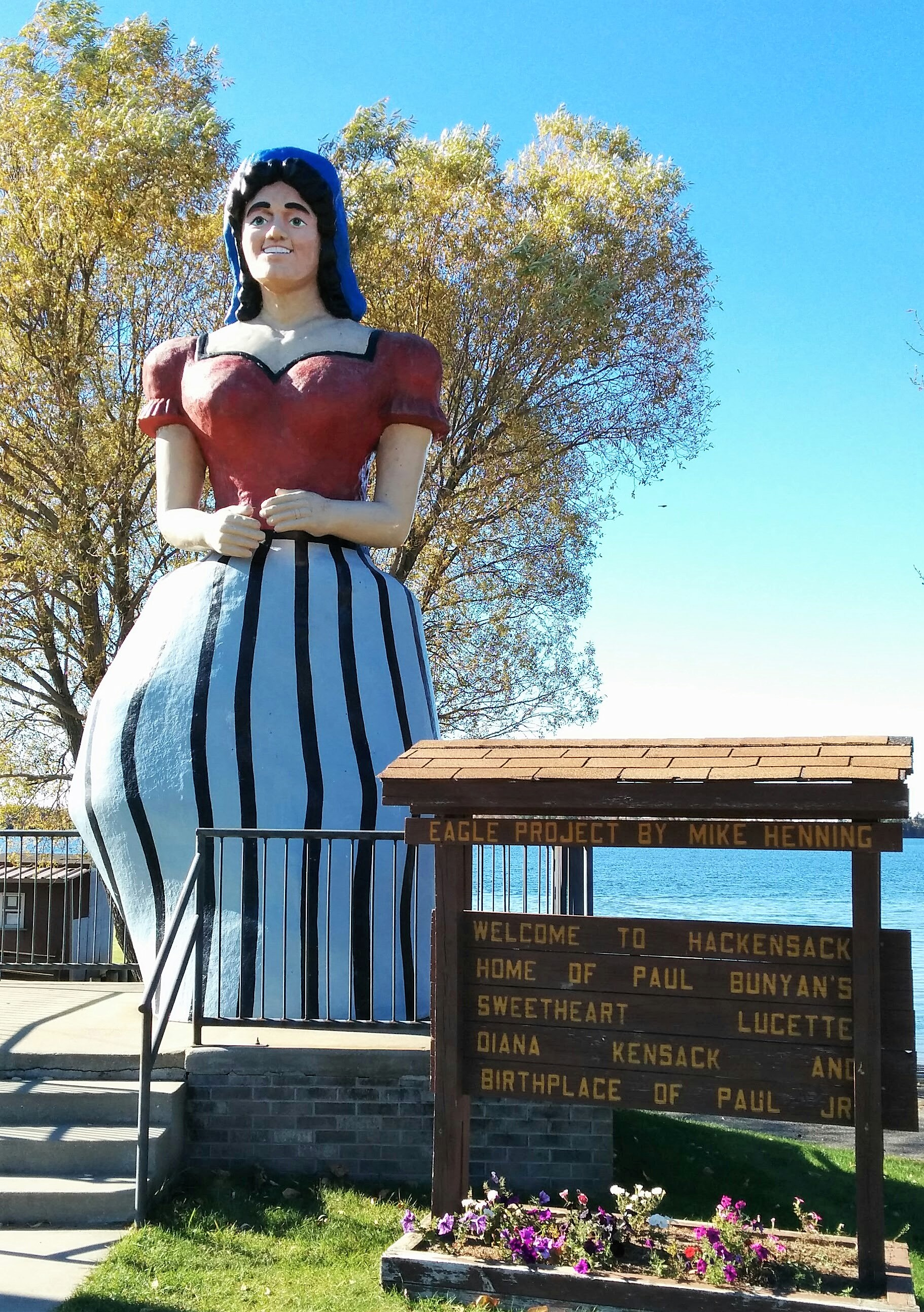
Statue of Lucette, Paul Bunyan's sweetheart

== Geography ==
According to the United States Census Bureau, the city has a total area of 1.02 square miles (2.64 km^{2}), of which 1.01 square miles (2.62 km^{2}) is land and 0.01 square miles (0.03 km^{2}) is water.

Minnesota State Highway 371 serves as a main route in the community.

Hackensack is located along the eastern shore of Birch Lake and maintains an asphalt boat ramp for lake access. Other lakes in the area include Pleasant Lake and Ten Mile Lake, the second-deepest natural lake in the state.

The Paul Bunyan State Trail passes through the city along the east shore of Birch lake.

== Events ==
Hackensack hosts the annual Children’s Fishing Contest, a free, catch-and-release youth competition held every Tuesday from June through August at Birch Lake—one of the longest-running community events in the region.

== Demographics ==
Historical population
Census	Pop.	Note	%±
1910	84		—
1920	200		138.1%
1930	256		28.0%
1940	264		3.1%
1950	272		3.0%
1960	204		−25.0%
1970	220		7.8%
1980	285		29.5%
1990	245		−14.0%
2000	285		16.3%
2010	313		9.8%
2020	294		−6.1%
U.S. Decennial Census; 2013 Estimate

=== 2010 census ===
As of the census of 2010, there were 313 people, 143 households, and 79 families living in the city. The population density was 309.9 inhabitants per square mile (119.7/km^{2}). There were 194 housing units at an average density of 192.1 per square mile (74.2/km^{2}). The racial makeup of the city was 95.8% White, 1.0% Native American, and 3.2% from two or more races. Hispanic or Latino of any race were 0.3% of the population.

There were 143 households, of which 25.9% had children under the age of 18 living with them, 42.0% were married couples living together, 4.9% had a female householder with no husband present, 8.4% had a male householder with no wife present, and 44.8% were non-families. 38.5% of all households were made up of individuals, and 14% had someone living alone who was 65 years of age or older. The average household size was 2.13 and the average family size was 2.85.

The median age in the city was 45.1 years. 19.8% of residents were under the age of 18; 9.3% were between the ages of 18 and 24; 20.8% were from 25 to 44; 24.9% were from 45 to 64; and 25.2% were 65 years of age or older. The gender makeup of the city was 54.3% male and 45.7% female.

=== 2000 census ===
As of the census of 2000, there were 285 people, 132 households, and 76 families living in the city. The population density was 400.6 inhabitants per square mile (154.7/km^{2}). There were 187 housing units at an average density of 262.9 per square mile (101.5/km^{2}). The racial makeup of the city was 96.84% White, 2.11% Native American, and 1.05% from two or more races. Hispanic or Latino of any race were 0.35% of the population.

There were 132 households, out of which 19.7% had children under the age of 18 living with them, 48.5% were married couples living together, 4.5% had a female householder with no husband present, and 42.4% were non-families. 36.4% of all households were made up of individuals, and 18.9% had someone living alone who was 65 years of age or older. The average household size was 2.16 and the average family size was 2.74.

In the city, the population was spread out, with 20.4% under the age of 18, 7.4% from 18 to 24, 23.9% from 25 to 44, 21.8% from 45 to 64, and 26.7% who were 65 years of age or older. The median age was 44 years. For every 100 females, there were 88.7 males. For every 100 females age 18 and over, there were 90.8 males.

The median income for a household in the city was $24,375, and the median income for a family was $31,094. Males had a median income of $18,438 versus $25,556 for females. The per capita income for the city was $12,768. About 3.3% of families and 10.5% of the population were below the poverty line, including 2.0% of those under the age of eighteen and 10.8% of those 65 or over.

== Education ==
Hackensack Public Schools are part of the Walker-Hackensack-Akeley School District. Schools in the district include Walker-Hackensack-Akeley Elementary School and Walker-Hackensack-Akeley High School (WHA).

Dr. Mary Donohue Stetz is the Superintendent of Schools.
