= Fairmont, Minnesota =

City in the United States

Fairmont
- City
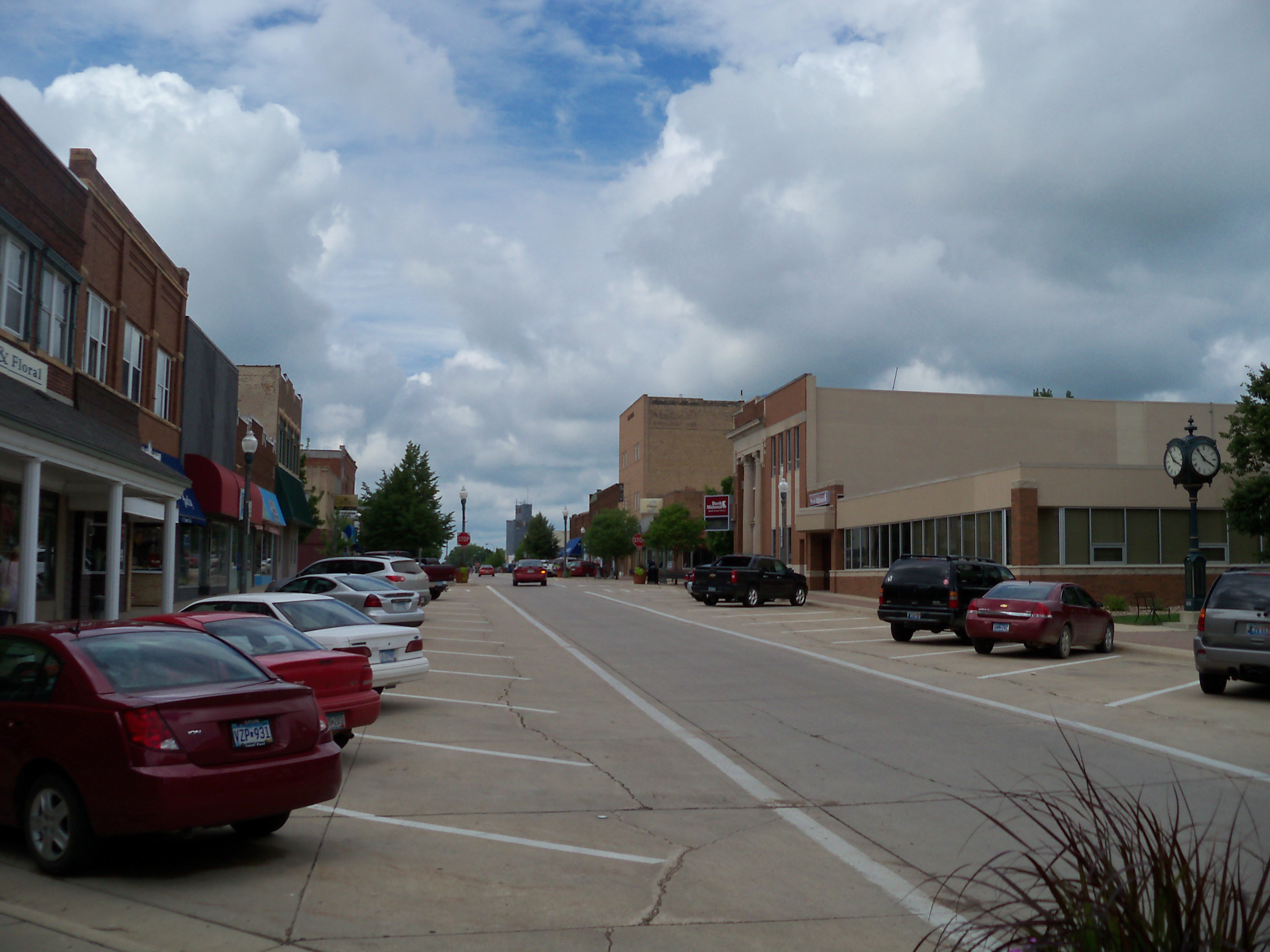
- Street in downtown Fairmont
- Nickname: City of Lakes
- Location in Martin County and the state of Minnesota
- Coordinates: 43°38′39″N 94°27′44″W
- Country: United States
- State: Minnesota
- County: Martin
- Platted: 1857
- Incorporated (village): 1860
- Incorporated (city): February 28, 1878
- City Charter Adopted: 1902

Government
  - Mayor: Lee Baarts

Area
  - City: 16.89 sq mi (43.74 km^{2})
  - Land: 15.00 sq mi (38.85 km^{2})
  - Water: 1.89 sq mi (4.90 km^{2})
- Elevation: 1,188 ft (362 m)

Population (2020)
  - City: 10,487
  - Estimate (2022): 10,260
  - Density: 684.0/sq mi (264.11/km^{2})
  - Urban: 8,387
  - Metro: 19,650
- Time zone: UTC−6 (Central (CST))
  - Summer (DST): UTC−5 (CDT)
- ZIP Code: 56031
- Area code: 507
- FIPS code: 27-20330
- GNIS feature ID: 2394735
- Sales tax: 7.375%
- Website: fairmont.org

Fairmont is a city in and the county seat of Martin County, Minnesota, United States. The population was 10,487 at the 2020 census.

== History ==
Fairmont was established in 1857. The city's name reflects its elevated town site. A post office has been operational at Fairmont since 1858. Fairmont was incorporated as a city on February 28, 1878, and its first city charter was adopted in 1902.

== Geography ==
Fairmont is southeast of the center of Martin County and was built along a chain of five lakes: Lake George, Sisseton Lake, Budd Lake, Hall Lake, and Amber Lake. All except Amber Lake are connected by channels and extensively used for recreational boating and fishing. Interstate 90 and Minnesota State Highway 15 are two of the main routes in the city. I-90 leads east 57 miles (92 km) to Albert Lea and west 59 miles (95 km) to Worthington, while MN 15 leads north 27 miles (43 km) to Madelia and south 20 miles (32 km) to Armstrong, Iowa.

According to the United States Census Bureau, Fairmont has an area of 16.89 square miles (43.74 km^{2}), of which 15.00 square miles (38.85 km^{2}) are land and 1.89 square miles (4.90 km^{2}), or 11.2%, are water. The five lakes in the city drain northward out of Lake George into Center Creek, an east-flowing tributary of the Blue Earth River, part of the Minnesota River watershed.

=== Climate ===
Climate data for Fairmont, Minnesota, 1991–2020 normals, extremes 1891–present
Month	Jan	Feb	Mar	Apr	May	Jun	Jul	Aug	Sep	Oct	Nov	Dec	Year
Record high °F (°C)	64 (18)	64 (18)	86 (30)	90 (32)	108 (42)	106 (41)	108 (42)	109 (43)	100 (38)	93 (34)	79 (26)	67 (19)	109 (43)
Mean maximum °F (°C)	43.7 (6.5)	48.6 (9.2)	66.6 (19.2)	81.3 (27.4)	87.1 (30.6)	92.4 (33.6)	93.7 (34.3)	91.3 (32.9)	87.9 (31.1)	80.6 (27.0)	64.1 (17.8)	47.2 (8.4)	95.2 (35.1)
Mean daily maximum °F (°C)	23.9 (−4.5)	28.3 (−2.1)	40.9 (4.9)	56.3 (13.5)	68.9 (20.5)	79.7 (26.5)	82.9 (28.3)	80.7 (27.1)	74.5 (23.6)	59.9 (15.5)	43.2 (6.2)	29.1 (−1.6)	55.7 (13.2)
Daily mean °F (°C)	15.2 (−9.3)	19.2 (−7.1)	31.6 (−0.2)	45.6 (7.6)	58.9 (14.9)	69.9 (21.1)	73.4 (23.0)	71.0 (21.7)	63.4 (17.4)	49.6 (9.8)	34.3 (1.3)	21.2 (−6.0)	46.1 (7.8)
Mean daily minimum °F (°C)	6.6 (−14.1)	10.2 (−12.1)	22.4 (−5.3)	34.9 (1.6)	49.0 (9.4)	60.1 (15.6)	63.9 (17.7)	61.3 (16.3)	52.4 (11.3)	39.4 (4.1)	25.4 (−3.7)	13.3 (−10.4)	36.6 (2.5)
Mean minimum °F (°C)	−14.3 (−25.7)	−10.5 (−23.6)	1.8 (−16.8)	21.7 (−5.7)	35.4 (1.9)	46.7 (8.2)	53.7 (12.1)	49.5 (9.7)	36.6 (2.6)	24.3 (−4.3)	8.3 (−13.2)	−9.9 (−23.3)	−18.8 (−28.2)
Record low °F (°C)	−35 (−37)	−33 (−36)	−30 (−34)	2 (−17)	22 (−6)	30 (−1)	40 (4)	34 (1)	18 (−8)	0 (−18)	−19 (−28)	−26 (−32)	−35 (−37)
Average precipitation inches (mm)	0.85 (22)	1.16 (29)	1.93 (49)	3.53 (90)	4.58 (116)	5.02 (128)	3.88 (99)	3.79 (96)	3.44 (87)	2.32 (59)	1.58 (40)	1.38 (35)	33.46 (850)
Average snowfall inches (cm)	6.3 (16)	6.8 (17)	9.6 (24)	3.4 (8.6)	0.0 (0.0)	0.0 (0.0)	0.0 (0.0)	0.0 (0.0)	0.0 (0.0)	0.3 (0.76)	5.3 (13)	13.5 (34)	45.2 (113.36)
Average extreme snow depth inches (cm)	9.9 (25)	9.4 (24)	7.8 (20)	2.6 (6.6)	0.0 (0.0)	0.0 (0.0)	0.0 (0.0)	0.0 (0.0)	0.0 (0.0)	0.1 (0.25)	3.9 (9.9)	8.6 (22)	15.9 (40)
Average precipitation days (≥ 0.01 in)	7.4	6.2	7.5	10.2	11.8	12.1	9.5	9.0	8.4	7.9	6.0	7.4	103.4
Average snowy days (≥ 0.1 in)	4.8	3.8	2.7	1.3	0.0	0.0	0.0	0.0	0.0	0.2	3.0	5.3	21.1
Source 1: NOAA (snow/snow days 1981–2010)
Source 2: XMACIS2 (mean maxima/minima, snow depth 1981–2010)

== Demographics ==
Historical population
Census	Pop.	Note	%±
1880	541		—
1890	1,205		122.7%
1900	3,040		152.3%
1910	2,958		−2.7%
1920	4,630		56.5%
1930	5,521		19.2%
1940	6,988		26.6%
1950	8,193		17.2%
1960	9,745		18.9%
1970	10,751		10.3%
1980	11,506		7.0%
1990	11,265		−2.1%
2000	10,889		−3.3%
2010	10,666		−2.0%
2020	10,487		−1.7%
2022 (est.)	10,260		−2.2%
U.S. Decennial Census; 2020 Census

=== 2020 census ===
As of the 2020 census, Fairmont had a population of 10,487. The median age was 43.4 years. 21.8% of residents were under the age of 18 and 23.8% of residents were 65 years of age or older. For every 100 females there were 92.1 males, and for every 100 females age 18 and over there were 91.7 males age 18 and over.

80.0% of residents lived in urban areas, while 20.0% lived in rural areas.

There were 4,735 households in Fairmont, of which 24.4% had children under the age of 18 living in them. Of all households, 41.0% were married-couple households, 20.7% were households with a male householder and no spouse or partner present, and 30.7% were households with a female householder and no spouse or partner present. About 38.7% of all households were made up of individuals and 19.0% had someone living alone who was 65 years of age or older.

There were 5,187 housing units, of which 8.7% were vacant. The homeowner vacancy rate was 1.7% and the rental vacancy rate was 8.8%.

Racial composition as of the 2020 census
Race	Number	Percent
White	9,296	88.6%
Black or African American	95	0.9%
American Indian and Alaska Native	47	0.4%
Asian	81	0.8%
Native Hawaiian and Other Pacific Islander	4	0.0%
Some other race	418	4.0%
Two or more races	546	5.2%
Hispanic or Latino (of any race)	1,038	9.9%

=== 2010 census ===
As of the census of 2010, there were 10,666 people, 4,812 households, and 2,816 families living in the city. The population density was 709.2 inhabitants per square mile (273.8/km^{2}). There were 5,251 housing units at an average density of 349.1 per square mile (134.8/km^{2}). The racial makeup of the city was 95.6% White, 0.5% African American, 0.3% Native American, 0.7% Asian, 1.9% from other races, and 1.1% from two or more races. Hispanic or Latino of any race were 5.3% of the population.

There were 4,812 households, of which 24.8% had children under the age of 18 living with them, 45.2% were married couples living together, 9.4% had a female householder with no husband present, 4.0% had a male householder with no wife present, and 41.5% were non-families. 36.0% of all households were made up of individuals, and 16.9% had someone living alone who was 65 years of age or older. The average household size was 2.17 and the average family size was 2.78.

The median age in the city was 45.5 years. 21.4% of residents were under the age of 18; 6.9% were between the ages of 18 and 24; 21.1% were from 25 to 44; 28.4% were from 45 to 64; and 22.2% were 65 years of age or older. The gender makeup of the city was 47.5% male and 52.5% female.

=== 2000 census ===
As of the census of 2000, there were 10,889 people and 2,962 families living in the city. The population density was 747.5 inhabitants per square mile (288.6/km^{2}). There were 5,036 housing units at an average density of 345.7 per square mile (133.5/km^{2}). The racial makeup of the city was 96.1% White, 0.4% African American, 0.1% Native American, 0.6% Asian, 0.03% Pacific Islander, 1.9% from other races, and 0.9% from two or more races.

There were 4,702 households, out of which 28.6% had children under the age of 18 living with them, 51.0% were married couples living together, 9.3% had a female householder with no husband present, and 37.0% were non-families. 33.2% of all households were made up of individuals, and 16.7% had someone living alone who was 65 years of age or older. The average household size was 2.25 and the average family size was 2.86.

In the city, the age of the population is varied with 24.3% under the age of 18, 6.7% from 18 to 24, 24.8% from 25 to 44, 23.1% from 45 to 64, and 21.1% who were 65 years of age or older. The median age was 41 years. For every 100 females, there were 90.2 males. For every 100 females age 18 and over, there were 85.3 males.

The median income for a household in the city was $33,709, and the median income for a family was $46,637. Males had a median income of $31,365 versus $22,447 for females. The per capita income for the city was $18,658. About 8.0% of families and 11.9% of the population were below the poverty line, including 20.7% of those under age 18 and 9.3% of those age 65 or over.

== Economy ==
Fairmont has been home to Fairmont Railway Motors, Inc, now part of Harsco Corporation, for a century. The company pioneered motorized railway section cars, later road-rail technologies as well as track maintenance machinery that revolutionized and mechanized rail track engineering.

Fairmont products are exported around the world, although the dominant product, railroad speeders, is now mainly in the hands of railway enthusiasts who operate them for fun, such as the North American Railcar Operators Association and the Australian Society of Section Car Operators, Inc.

Fairmont is home to the U.S. headquarters of Avery Weigh-Tronix, one of the world's largest suppliers of weighing solutions.

The Fairmont Sentinel is published here. It was founded in 1885 and is published daily, except Sunday. As of 2019, it was owned by Ogden Newspapers and had a circulation of 3,629.

Fairmont's largest employer is Fairmont Medical Center, part of the Mayo Health System.

Until 1992, Fairmont was home to a major regional frozen food canning operation. Long owned by Stokely-Van Camp, the plant fell under the United Foods International umbrella after United Foods' 1982 $50 million buyout of Van Camp's frozen vegetable division. Before closing in December 1992, the Fairmont plant was one three frozen vegetable processing plants producing product for the United Foods family of canned vegetables for sale nationwide. The plant reopened and operated until 2015 as Fairmont Foods of Minnesota. Its closing was announced, but Tony Downs Food Group purchased it and kept it open.

=== Top employers ===
According to the Fairmont's 2020 Comprehensive Annual Financial Report, the city's largest employers:

#	Employer	# of Employees
1	Fairmont Foods of Minnesota	325
2	Weigh-Tronix Scale Manufacturing	305
3	Fairmont Mayo Health Systems	300
4	ISD 2752 (Fairmont Area Schools)	300
5	REM Heartland	250
6	Hy-Vee	240
7	Torgerson Properties	218
8	Preferred Capital Management	194
9	Walmart	191
10	Lakeview Health Care Facility	167

== Education ==
Local schools:

- Fairmont Junior/Senior High School
- Fairmont Elementary School
- St. John Vianney Catholic School, K-6
- St. Paul Lutheran School, K-8 (Martin Luther High School 9-12 is in nearby Northrop)

Higher education

- Minnesota West Community College

== Notable people ==
- Frank A. Day, newspaper editor, Minnesota legislator and the 13th lieutenant governor of Minnesota
- CJ Holstine, Education Minnesota's 2018 Minnesota Teacher of the Year
- Josh Liljenquist, social media personality and philanthropist
- Jerry Rosburg, NFL coach
- Kenneth E. Scott, politician
- Brandon Williamson, Major League Baseball pitcher for the Cincinnati Reds
