= Fairmont Junior/Senior High School =

- Fairmont Junior/Senior High School in 2026

Location
- 900 Johnson Street; Fairmont, Minnesota 56031; United States; 43°38′10.48″N 94°26′56.65″W

Information
- Type: Public
- Established: 1886; 140 years ago
- Locale: Town, remote
- School board: Fairmont Area Schools Board of Education
- School district: Fairmont Area Schools
- NCES District ID: 2700124
- Superintendent: Andy Traetow
- CEEB code: 240795
- NCES School ID: 270012400553
- Principal: Chad Brusky
- Teaching staff: 42.98 (FTE) (2024–2025)
- Grades: 7-12
- Enrollment: 839 (2024–2025)
- Student to teacher ratio: 19.52 (2024–2025)
- Colors: Cardinal and white
- Slogan: Where Every Day Is A Great Day To Be A Cardinal!
- Fight song: Fairmont Fight Song
- Athletics conference: Big South Conference
- Sports: Baseball, basketball, cross country, football, golf, hockey, soccer, tennis, track and field, wrestling, dance, gymnastics, softball, volleyball, and cheerleading
- Mascot: Cardinal
- Nickname: Cardinals
- Team name: Cardinals
- Rival: Blue Earth Area
- Website: www.fairmont.k12.mn.us/o/fairmont-area-sd/page/fjhs-homepage2

Fairmont Junior/Senior High School is a public secondary school in Fairmont, Minnesota, United States. It is part of the Fairmont Area Schools.

== History ==
The first high school opened in 1886 on Park Street in Fairmont. A separate high school building was erected at that location in 1900. A second high school was built in 1915 at what is now Veterans Memorial Park in Fairmont. A third high school was built in 1956 on Victoria Street, and the previous high school building became a junior high. Two fires destroyed the junior high school in 1969, and those students transferred to the high school, where junior and senior students attended in shifts until 1973, when a new high school opened at the school's current location on Victoria Street. The first graduating class from the building was the class of 1973.

== Extracurricular activities ==
The boys' baseball team, the Fairmont Cardinals, won the High School League Class AA state championship in 2022.

== Notable alumni ==
- Bob Gunther, member of Minnesota House of Representatives
- Michael Izen, auxiliary bishop for Archdiocese of Saint Paul and Minneapolis
- Josh Liljenquist, philanthropist
- Jim Pehler, member of Minnesota House of Representatives and Minnesota Senate
- Kenneth E. Scott, member of Minnesota House of Representatives

== Notable staff ==
- Jerry Rosburg, football coach
