= Walker-Hackensack-Akeley School District =

School district in Minnesota, United States

Address
- 301 4th St Walker, Minnesota, 56484; United States

District information
- Grades: PreKindergarten - 12
- Superintendent: Kevin Wellen
- NCES District ID: 2702910

Students and staff
- Enrollment: 766 (2019-2020)
- Student–teacher ratio: 11.90

Other information
- Website: www.wha.k12.mn.us

Walker-Hackensack-Akeley School District is a public school district in Cass County, Minnesota, United States, based in Walker, Minnesota.

The Walker-Hackensack-Akeley district was formed by the 1990 consolidation of the Walker and Akeley districts. Under Minnesota law it was a consolidation.

== Schools ==
The Walker-Hackensack-Akeley School District has one elementary school and one high school.

- Walker-Hackensack-Akeley Elementary School(W-H-A)
- Walker-Hackensack-Akeley High School
