= John J. Winter =

American politician (1866–1946)

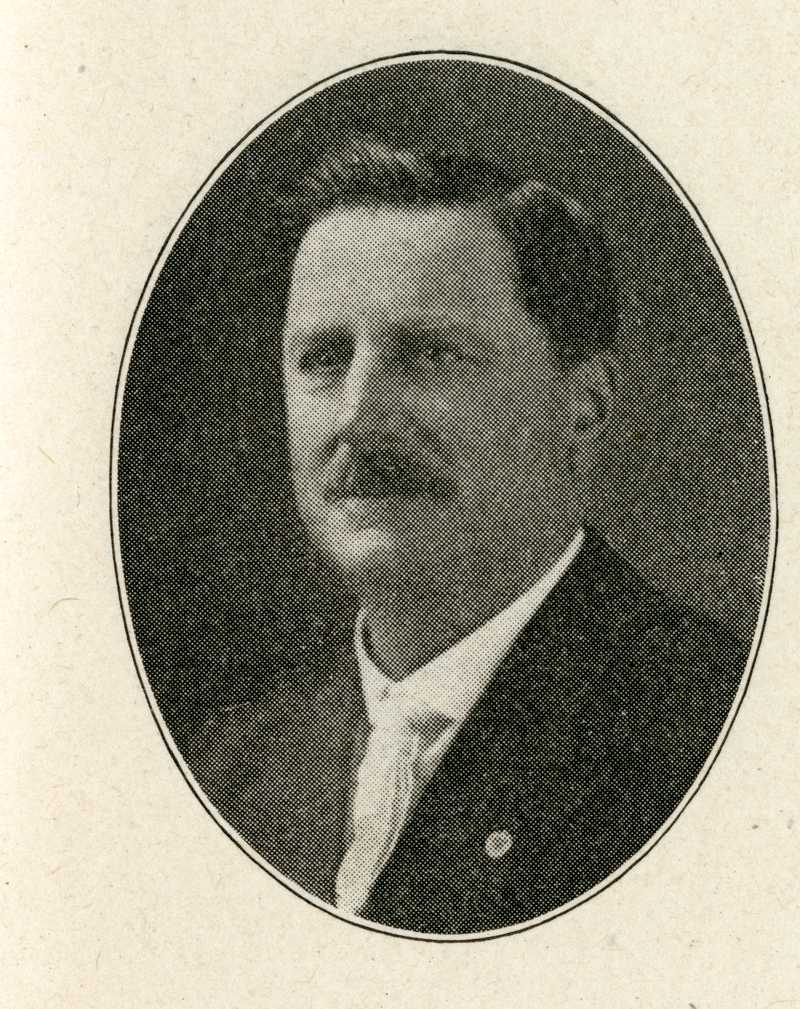

Member of the Minnesota House of Representatives from the 46th district
- In office January 2, 1917 – January 6, 1919 Serving with John N. Nett
- Preceded by: Frank E. Minnette; Henry Stoetzel
- Succeeded by: Thomas J. Flahaven

Personal details
- Born: October 27, 1866 Stearns County, Minnesota, U.S.
- Died: July 1, 1946 (aged 79)
- Spouse: Mary Lenz (m. 1891)
- Children: 10
- Occupation: Politician; farmer

John J. Winter (October 27, 1866 – July 1, 1946) was an American politician and farmer. He served as the representative for the 46th district in the Minnesota House of Representatives from 1917 to 1919, alongside John N. Nett.

== Life and career ==
Winter was born on October 27, 1866, in Stearns County, Minnesota. His father, John Winter, was an American Civil War veteran and pioneer of Stearns County. He married Mary Lenz in 1891 and the couple had 10 children together.

In 1901, he became the town clerk of Spring Hill, Minnesota, a position that he would hold until 1912.

In 1916, he ran for Minnesota's first 46th House of Representatives district. In the primary, he fought against Robert R. Kells, which he would succeed in. He was a candidate for re-election for the same seat, although lost.

In 1922, he ran against incumbent Thomas J. Flahaven in the Minnesota House of Representatives for the same district he once held, although lost.

In 1928, he ran again for Minnesota's first 46th House of Representatives district. In an upset, he lost to incumbent Zeno F. Moser by 687 votes.

Winter was a delegate to the Stearns County Democratic Party convention in 1902 and 1922.

On July 1, 1946, at approximately 12:40 a.m., Winter died aged 79 shortly after falling ill.

== Electoral history ==
1916 Minnesota's first 48th House of Representatives district general election
Candidate	Votes	%
John J. Winter	1,353	54.51%
Robert R. Kells	1,131	45.57%
Total votes	2,482	100.00%

1918 Minnesota's first 48th House of Representatives district election
Primary election
Candidate	Votes	%
Thomas J. Flahaven	1,160	44.24%
John J. Winter	744	28.38%
Charles R. Bruce	718	27.38%
Total votes	2,622	100.00%
General election
Thomas J. Flahaven	1,219	58.69%
John J. Winter	858	41.31%
Total votes	2,077	100.00%

1922 Minnesota's first 48th House of Representatives district general election
Candidate	Votes	%
Thomas J. Flahaven	2,161	59.75%
John J. Winter	1,456	40.25%
Total votes	3,617	100.00%

1928 Minnesota's first 48th House of Representatives district general election
Candidate	Votes	%
Zeno F. Moser	3,046	56.19%
John J. Winter	2,375	43.81%
Total votes	5,421	100.00%
