= Lismore =

Lismore may refer to:

== Places ==
- Lismore, New South Wales, Australia, a city
  - City of Lismore, a local government area in New South Wales
- Lismore, Victoria, Australia, a small town
- Lismore, Nova Scotia, Canada, a community
- Lismore, County Waterford, Ireland, a town
- Lismore (Parliament of Ireland constituency), a former constituency in the Irish House of Commons
- Lismore Castle, County Waterford, Ireland
- Lismore, County Laois, Ireland, a townland
- Lismore, County Down, a townland in Dunsfort, County Down, Northern Ireland
- Lismore, County Tyrone, a townland in County Tyrone, Northern Ireland
- Lismore, New Zealand, a village near Mayfield, Canterbury, New Zealand
- Lismore, Scotland, an island in the Inner Hebrides
- Lismore, Minnesota, United States
  - Lismore Township, Nobles County, Minnesota
- Lismore Circus, a historic street on London, England
- Lismore Fields, an archaeological site in Buxton, England
- Lismore Abbey, monastic place in Ireland

== Literature ==
- Book of Lismore, a 15th-century Irish-Gaelic manuscript
- Book of the Dean of Lismore, a 16th-century Scottish-Gaelic manuscript

== Sports ==
- Lismore GAA, a Gaelic Athletic Association club in Lismore, Ireland
- Lismore RFC, a rugby club based in Edinburgh

== Other uses ==
- Lismore (band), American electronic band from New Jersey
- HMAS Lismore (J145), a WWII-era Australian Navy corvette
- Lismore, a Speyside single malt whisky from Scotland

== See also ==
- Lismore College (disambiguation)
- Bishop of Lismore (disambiguation)
