= Bigelow, Minnesota =

City in Minnesota, United States

Bigelow
- City
- Location of Bigelow, Minnesota
- Coordinates: 43°30′19″N 95°41′21″W
- Country: United States
- State: Minnesota
- County: Nobles

Government
  - Type: Mayor - Council
  - Mayor: Bryan Brandt

Area
  - Total: 0.39 sq mi (1.02 km^{2})
  - Land: 0.39 sq mi (1.02 km^{2})
  - Water: 0 sq mi (0.00 km^{2})
- Elevation: 1,647 ft (502 m)

Population (2020)
  - Total: 227
  - Density: 577.5/sq mi (222.96/km^{2})
- Time zone: UTC-6 (Central (CST))
  - Summer (DST): UTC-5 (CDT)
- ZIP code: 56117
- Area code: 507
- FIPS code: 27-05644
- GNIS feature ID: 2394166

Bigelow is a city in Nobles County, Minnesota, United States. As of the 2020 census, Bigelow had a population of 227.

== Geography ==
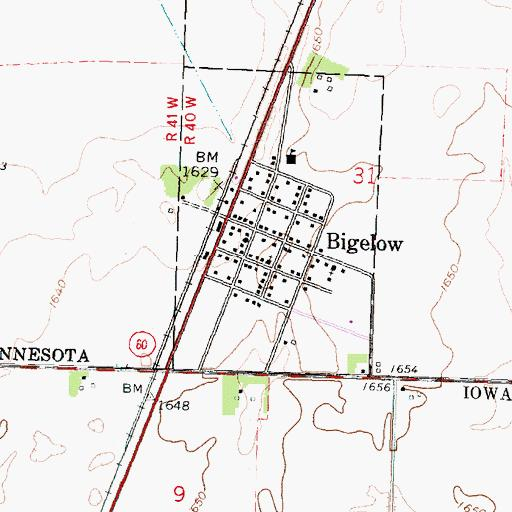
Topographic map of Bigelow, Minnesota

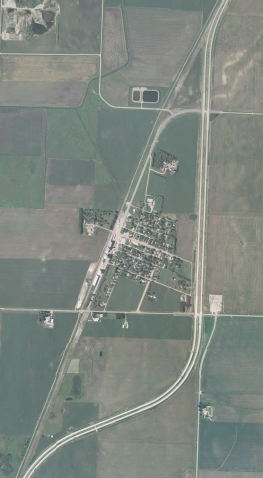
This USGS satellite photo shows Highway 60 as it bypasses Bigelow on its east side

Charles H. Bigelow, namesake of Bigelow, Minnesota, circa 1894

According to the United States Census Bureau, the city has a total area of 0.40 square miles (1.04 km^{2}), all land. The town of Bigelow is located in southcentral Nobles County in section 31 of Bigelow Township. The southern corporate limit of the town is defined by the Iowa border.

Main highway is:

- Minnesota State Highway 60

Other important transportation:

- Union Pacific Railroad

== History ==
Hiawatha pageant, Bigelow school, 1908

Postcard of Main Street, Bigelow, Minnesota, dated 1910

Beginnings: The town of Bigelow was the third community to come into existence in Nobles County. The first two were Worthington and Brewster. All three towns appeared on the map in 1871, though Bigelow remained nothing more than that - a spot on a map - until the spring of 1872, when the tracks of the St. Paul & Sioux City Railway reached the site of the present-day town. Throughout the summer of 1872, the site was occupied only by a large tent which furnished shelter for the construction crew. A railroad depot was constructed in September 1872, and Mr. S. O. Morse assumed duties as station agent. He went into partnership with a man named Frothingham, and the two established a small grocery store in the depot. This was the only business established in 1872.

Source of name: Even before railroad tracks had reached present-day Bigelow, the town's future name had been decided. It was named after Charles H. Bigelow. He was also a director of the St. Paul & Sioux City Railway, and the board decided to flatter him by naming a new town after him. Bigelow Township was also named after Mr. Bigelow. There is no record of Charles Bigelow visiting the town that bears his name, though it is likely he passed through on the railroad that he helped to create.

Incorporation: The townsite was platted and a dedication was made on September 24, 1873. Two new business came to town in 1873. S. D. Tinnes opened a general merchandise store and John DeBoos and John Colvin opened a hardware store. A grain dealer, a lumber yard, and a coal business were established in 1874. A school house was also built in that year and began that fall with 24 students. The village grew slowly. The 1880 census gave Bigelow a population of only 28. (One must assume that many of the 24 students enrolled in the Bigelow school resided on farms outside of the village.) Charles L. Davidson, of Hull, Iowa, purchased the townsite on January 25, 1892, and decided to "boom the town", or attract investment and settlers. His efforts apparently paid off, for by 1894, Bigelow claimed 150 residents. A census taken on November 16, 1899, counted 224 residents. On February 13, 1900, an election was held, and by a vote of 37 to 6 it was decided that the time had come for municipal government. The first president of Bigelow was a Mr. W. C. Wyatt.

Bigelow today: According to the 2010 census, Bigelow has a population of 235. Perhaps a half-dozen businesses exist in the town. In recent years, Minnesota State Highway 60, which once passed directly through town, was widened to four-lanes, and bypassed Bigelow entirely. Bigelow does not have a public school. Children attend school either in nearby Worthington or in Ellsworth. Minnesota's open-enrollment law gives them this option.

== Demographics ==
Historical population
Census	Pop.	Note	%±
1880	28		—
1910	195		—
1920	223		14.4%
1930	199		−10.8%
1940	250		25.6%
1950	238		−4.8%
1960	256		7.6%
1970	262		2.3%
1980	249		−5.0%
1990	232		−6.8%
2000	231		−0.4%
2010	235		1.7%
2020	227		−3.4%
U.S. Decennial Census

=== 2010 census ===
As of the census of 2010, there were 235 people, 88 households, and 59 families residing in the city. The population density was 587.5 inhabitants per square mile (226.8/km^{2}). There were 97 housing units at an average density of 242.5 per square mile (93.6/km^{2}). The racial makeup of the city was 87.7% White, 0.4% Native American, 11.5% from other races, and 0.4% from two or more races. Hispanic or Latino of any race were 20.0% of the population.

There were 88 households, of which 36.4% had children under the age of 18 living with them, 54.5% were married couples living together, 6.8% had a female householder with no husband present, 5.7% had a male householder with no wife present, and 33.0% were non-families. 26.1% of all households were made up of individuals, and 10.2% had someone living alone who was 65 years of age or older. The average household size was 2.67 and the average family size was 3.19.

The median age in the city was 34.5 years. 26.4% of residents were under the age of 18; 10.6% were between the ages of 18 and 24; 24.3% were from 25 to 44; 25.2% were from 45 to 64; and 13.6% were 65 years of age or older. The gender makeup of the city was 51.5% male and 48.5% female.

=== 2000 census ===
As of the census of 2000, there were 231 people, 87 households, and 62 families residing in the city. The population density was 610.7 inhabitants per square mile (235.8/km^{2}). There were 96 housing units at an average density of 253.8 per square mile (98.0/km^{2}). The racial makeup of the city was 92.64% White, 0.43% Native American, 0.87% Asian, 6.06% from other races. Hispanic or Latino of any race were 7.36% of the population.

There were 87 households, out of which 42.5% had children under the age of 18 living with them, 62.1% were married couples living together, 9.2% had a female householder with no husband present, and 27.6% were non-families. 23.0% of all households were made up of individuals, and 5.7% had someone living alone who was 65 years of age or older. The average household size was 2.66 and the average family size was 3.10.

In the city, the population was spread out, with 30.7% under the age of 18, 8.7% from 18 to 24, 32.5% from 25 to 44, 18.2% from 45 to 64, and 10.0% who were 65 years of age or older. The median age was 32 years. For every 100 females, there were 111.9 males. For every 100 females age 18 and over, there were 97.5 males.

The median income for a household in the city was $32,750, and the median income for a family was $38,750. Males had a median income of $30,417 versus $18,125 for females. The per capita income for the city was $15,227. About 13.2% of families and 12.2% of the population were below the poverty line, including none of those under the age of eighteen and 21.9% of those 65 or over.

== Politics ==
Bigelow is located in Minnesota's 1st congressional district, represented by Jim Hagedorn, a Republican. At the state level, Bigelow is located in Senate District 22, represented by Republican Bill Weber, and in House District 22B, represented by Republican Rod Hamilton.

== Local politics ==
The mayor of Bigelow is Bryan Brandt. City Council members are Terry Neugebauer, Robert Paplow, Brad Meester, and Ryan Weber. The city of Bigelow and Bigelow Township are represented by Nobles County Commissioner Matt Widboom.

== Notable person ==
The analytic philosopher Nicholas Wolterstorff was born in Bigelow.
