= Rushmore, Minnesota =

Town in Minnesota, United States

Rushmore
- City
- Location of Rushmore, Minnesota
- Coordinates: 43°37′11″N 95°47′56″W
- Country: United States
- State: Minnesota
- County: Nobles

Government
  - Type: Mayor - Council
  - Mayor: Gregg Harberts

Area
  - Total: 0.25 sq mi (0.66 km^{2})
  - Land: 0.25 sq mi (0.66 km^{2})
  - Water: 0 sq mi (0.00 km^{2})
- Elevation: 1,663 ft (507 m)

Population (2020)
  - Total: 365
  - Density: 1,437.3/sq mi (554.95/km^{2})
- Time zone: UTC-6 (Central (CST))
  - Summer (DST): UTC-5 (CDT)
- ZIP code: 56168
- Area code: 507
- FIPS code: 27-56338
- GNIS feature ID: 2396451
- Website: https://rushmoremn.com/

Rushmore is a town in Nobles County, Minnesota, United States. The population was 365 at the 2020 census.

== Geography ==
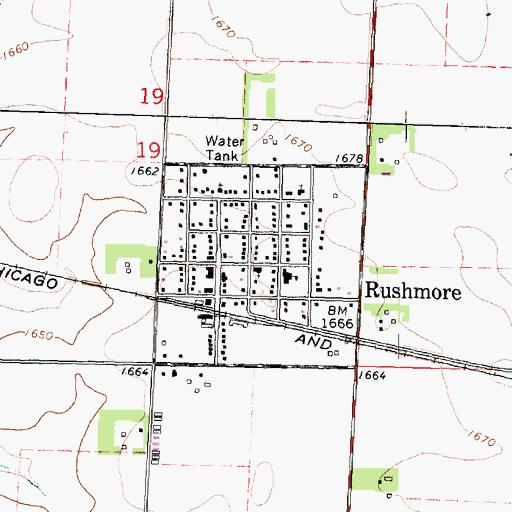
Topographic map of Rushmore

According to the United States Census Bureau, the city has a total area of 0.25 square miles (0.65 km^{2}), all land. Rushmore is located in section 19 of Dewald Township. It is situated on the Buffalo Ridge, a drainage divide between the Mississippi and Missouri River systems.

Main highways include:

- Interstate 90
- Nobles County Road 35
- Nobles County Road 13

== History ==
S. B. Bedford - first president of Rushmore Village

Postcard showing Main Street of Rushmore, Minnesota, around 1910

Bank and General Store, Rushmore, Minnesota

=== Founding ===
The city was named for S.M. Rushmore, an early pioneer. The town owes its existence to the construction of the Worthington and Sioux Falls Railway, and the desire of a New York capitalist to establish a land colonization scheme in southwestern Minnesota. When the Worthington and Sioux Falls Railway was initially surveyed, it was decided to construct a station house in section 19 of Dewald Township. The station house was Named Miller Station, in honor of ex-governor Stephen Miller, and for two years it had no inhabitants. In 1878, George I. Seney, a New York capitalist, secured control of large plots of railroad land in Dewald and Olney Townships. He immediately began the process of colonizing the lands, bringing out settlers from New York City and other eastern points. On May 27, 1878, a Mr. S. M. Rushmore arrived in Worthington along with his family, and immediately took a train for Miller Station. There he established a store to serve Mr. Seney's flood of colonists. A railroad depot was also constructed, and the town was surveyed and platted. In August 1878, the town was renamed Rushmore in honor of the pioneer shopkeeper, and the community grew rapidly. Indeed, a business directory from the fall of 1879 shows that Rushmore had a general store, a feed mill, an elevator, a hotel, a hardware store, a grocer, a lumber agent, a tinware dealer, a notion store, a jeweler, and two blacksmiths. The town also had a new church and a new school. On March 27, 1900, Rushmore, with a population of 204, was incorporated. Village government promptly began under President S. B. Bedford.

== Demographics ==
Historical population
Census	Pop.	Note	%±
1880	99		—
1910	237		—
1920	313		32.1%
1930	332		6.1%
1940	423		27.4%
1950	368		−13.0%
1960	382		3.8%
1970	394		3.1%
1980	387		−1.8%
1990	381		−1.6%
2000	376		−1.3%
2010	342		−9.0%
2020	365		6.7%
U.S. Decennial Census

=== 2010 census ===
As of the census of 2010, there were 342 people, 154 households, and 87 families residing in the city. The population density was 1,368.0 inhabitants per square mile (528.2/km^{2}). There were 173 housing units at an average density of 692.0 per square mile (267.2/km^{2}). The racial makeup of the city was 90.6% White, 0.9% African American, 3.8% Asian, 2.3% from other races, and 2.3% from two or more races. Hispanic or Latino of any race were 9.6% of the population.

There were 154 households, of which 27.9% had children under the age of 18 living with them, 39.6% were married couples living together, 11.0% had a female householder with no husband present, 5.8% had a male householder with no wife present, and 43.5% were non-families. 37.7% of all households were made up of individuals, and 22.7% had someone living alone who was 65 years of age or older. The average household size was 2.22 and the average family size was 2.83.

The median age in the city was 41.5 years. 22.8% of residents were under the age of 18; 8.2% were between the ages of 18 and 24; 22.6% were from 25 to 44; 29.6% were from 45 to 64; and 17% were 65 years of age or older. The gender makeup of the city was 54.1% male and 45.9% female.

=== 2000 census ===
As of the census of 2000, there were 376 people, 154 households, and 97 families residing in the city. The population density was 1,484.9 inhabitants per square mile (573.3/km^{2}). There were 173 housing units at an average density of 683.2 per square mile (263.8/km^{2}). The racial makeup of the city was 95.74% White, 0.27% Native American, 0.27% Asian, 3.19% from other races, and 0.53% from two or more races. Hispanic or Latino of any race were 3.99% of the population.

There were 154 households, out of which 29.9% had children under the age of 18 living with them, 55.2% were married couples living together, 3.9% had a female householder with no husband present, and 36.4% were non-families. 30.5% of all households were made up of individuals, and 20.8% had someone living alone who was 65 years of age or older. The average household size was 2.44 and the average family size was 3.08.

In the city, the population was spread out, with 27.7% under the age of 18, 8.0% from 18 to 24, 25.8% from 25 to 44, 19.4% from 45 to 64, and 19.1% who were 65 years of age or older. The median age was 38 years. For every 100 females, there were 88.9 males. For every 100 females age 18 and over, there were 86.3 males.

The median income for a household in the city was $33,750, and the median income for a family was $40,000. Males had a median income of $26,667 versus $20,208 for females. The per capita income for the city was $14,216. About 2.8% of families and 5.3% of the population were below the poverty line, including 4.2% of those under age 18 and 10.9% of those age 65 or over.

== Politics ==
Rushmore is located in Minnesota's 1st congressional district, represented by Jim Hagedorn, a Republican. At the state level, Rushmore is located in Senate District 22, represented by Republican Bill Weber, and in House District 22A, represented by Republican Joe Schomacker.

=== Local politics ===
The mayor of Rushmore is Gregg Harberts. City council members are Andrew Noble, Bruce Boltjes, Shirley Vis, and Carol Hieronimus. Rushmore is in Dewald Township and is represented by Nobles County Commissioner Matt Widboom.
