= Nobles County, Minnesota =

County in Minnesota, United States

- County
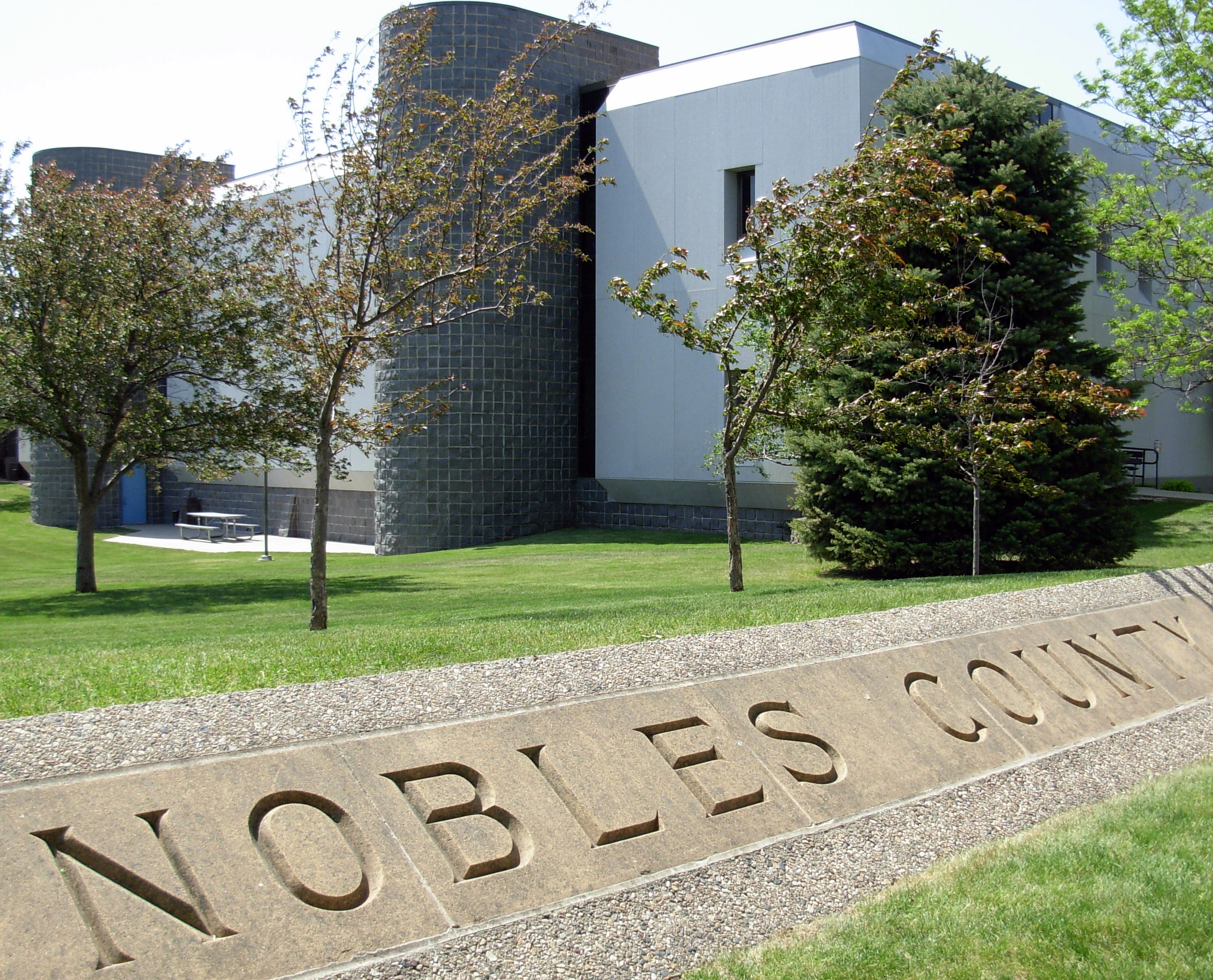
- Nobles County Government Center in Worthington

- Location within the U.S. state of Minnesota
- Coordinates: 43°40′39.67″N 95°45′47.275″W
- Country: United States
- State: Minnesota
- Founded: May 23, 1857 (created); October 27, 1870 (organized)
- Named for: William H. Nobles
- Seat: Worthington
- Largest city: Worthington

Area
  - Total: 722.551 sq mi (1,871.40 km^{2})
  - Land: 715.117 sq mi (1,852.14 km^{2})
  - Water: 7.434 sq mi (19.25 km^{2}) 1.0%

Population (2020)
  - Total: 22,290
  - Estimate (2025): 22,338 ▲
  - Density: 30.381/sq mi (11.730/km^{2})
- Time zone: UTC−6 (Central)
  - Summer (DST): UTC−5 (CDT)
- Congressional district: 1st
- Website: co.nobles.mn.us

Nobles County is a county in the U.S. state of Minnesota. As of the 2020 census, the population was 22,290. Its county seat is Worthington. Nobles County comprises the Worthington Micropolitan Statistical Area.

== History ==
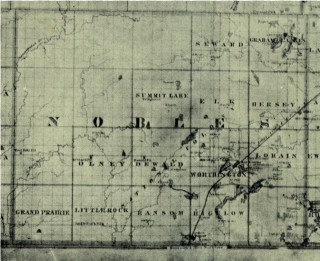
1874 map of Nobles County - Note that six townships had yet to be named

Nobles County was first occupied by the Sisseton Sioux. The first white man to set foot on the land was Joseph Nicolas Nicollet, who came to map the area in 1838. Nicollet named Lake Okabena (there were two Lake Okabenas at the time), Lake Ocheda, East and West Graham Lake, and the Kanaranzi Creek.

The first settlement was near Graham Lakes in 1846. Nobles County was established on May 23, 1857, and organized on October 27, 1870. The county was named for William H. Nobles, a member of the Minnesota territorial legislature in 1854 and 1856. In 1856, he began constructing a wagon road for the US government, crossing southwestern Minnesota and Nobles County, to extend from Fort Ridgely to South Pass in the Rocky Mountains. This work continued in 1857 but was not completed. Nobles County was created by the Minnesota Territory legislature just before the full force of the Panic of 1857 was felt. Settlers were further discouraged from coming by the Spirit Lake Massacre of 1857, where a band of Sioux murdered settlers in Spirit Lake and along the Des Moines River in Jackson and Cottonwood Counties. The few whites in the area were understandably reluctant to stay.

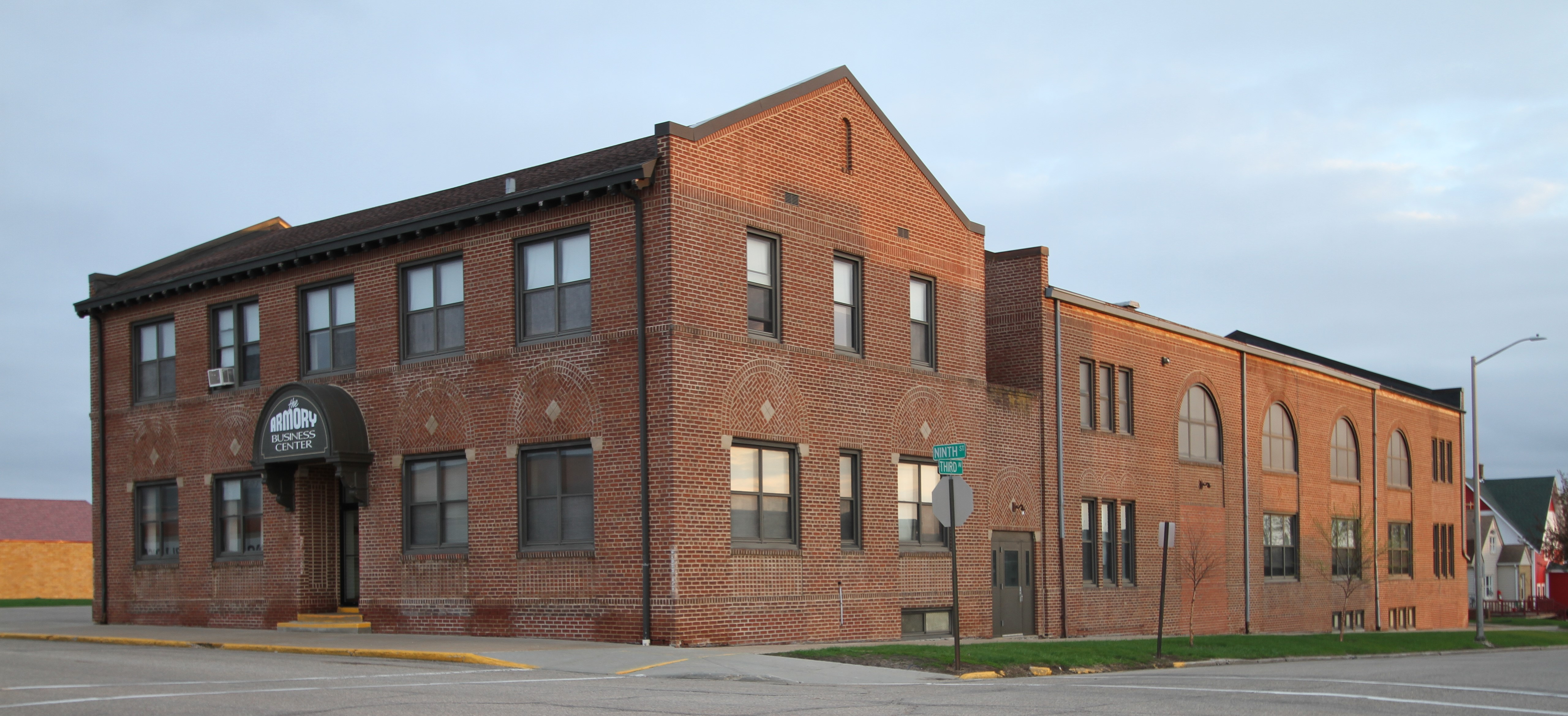
Nobles County Heritage Center

During the summer of 1867, a mail route was established from Blue Earth through the Graham Lakes settlement to Yankton, South Dakota. In January, a Post Office was established in each settlement. The population in the spring of 1870 was 117 and nearly doubled by fall. County Government did not start until 1870. The first railroad, the St. Paul & Sioux City Railway, was built in 1871. This later became the Chicago and North Western Railroad and is now operated by the Union Pacific Railroad.

In 1871, a group of men from Toledo, Ohio, organized a company to locate a colony of settlers in some western county. After traveling 20,000 miles in the Midwest, they decided on Nobles County and by the spring of 1872, hundreds of people came in and took up land. Worthington was platted in 1871, and became the county seat in 1873. The Worthington & Sioux Falls Railway was established in 1876. This led to rapid settlement in Rushmore, Adrian, and the western portions of the county.

The 1860 census of Nobles County showed 11 families, 35 persons, (3 from Norway, 3 from Bavaria, 1 from Ireland and the rest from the eastern states). In 1880, the population was 4,435. In 1895, the population was 11,905, and in 1970, the population was up to 23,208. In 2000, the population was 20,832, and the 2010 census showed a population of 21,378.

== Economy ==
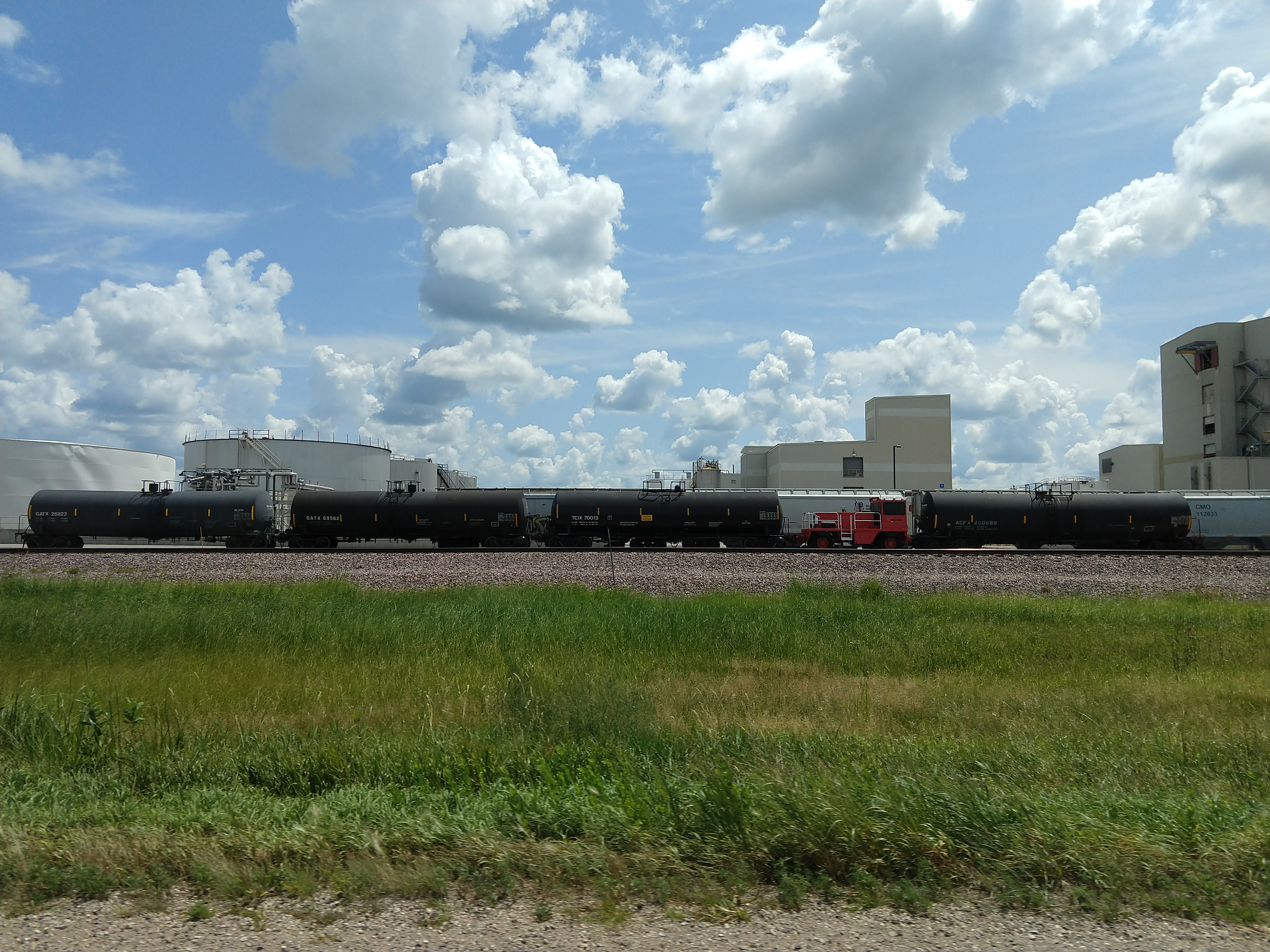
Minnesota Soybean Processors plant and rail line

Nobles County's economy is largely driven by agriculture, with corn, soybeans, and hogs as the county's leading agricultural products. Food processing and fabricated metals are important manufacturing sectors, and tourism is a growing industry that benefits from the county's lakes, parks, and historical sites.

== Geography ==
Soils of Nobles County

Map of Nobles County from 1882 Geological Report

Nobles County is on the southern side of Minnesota. Its southern border abuts the northern border of the state of Iowa. According to the United States Census Bureau, the county has an area of 722.551 square miles (1,871.40 km^{2}), of which 715.117 square miles (1,852.14 km^{2}) is land and 7.434 square miles (19.25 km^{2}) (1.0%) is water.

=== Transit ===
- Prairieland Transit System

=== Major highways ===
- Interstate 90
- U.S. Highway 59
- Minnesota State Highway 60
- Minnesota State Highway 91
- Minnesota State Highway 264

=== Adjacent counties ===
- Murray County - north
- Cottonwood County - northeast
- Jackson County - east
- Osceola County, Iowa - southeast
- Lyon County, Iowa - southwest
- Rock County - west

=== Lakes ===
- East Graham Lake
- Fulda First Lake
- Indian Lake
- Iowa Lake (part)
- Jack Lake
- Kinbrae Lake
- Lake Bella
- Lake Ocheda
- Lake Okabena
- West Graham Lake
- Willow Lake (part)

=== Protected areas ===
- Adrian Spring County Park
- Aid Pit State Wildlife Management Area
- Bigelow State Wildlife Management Area
- Champepadan State Wildlife Management Area
- Compass Prairie Scientific and Natural Area
- Dewald State Wildlife Management Area
- Eagle Lake State Wildlife Management Area
- Ells Pit State Wildlife Management Area
- Fenmont State Wildlife Management Area
- Fulda State Wildlife Management Area
- Fury State Wildlife Management Area
- Groth State Wildlife Management Area
- Hawkeye County Park
- John Erickson State Wildlife Management Area
- Lake Bella State Wildlife Management Area
- Lake Ocheda Game Refuge
- Lone Tree State Wildlife Management Area
- Maka-Oicu County Park
- Midway County Park
- Peterson State Wildlife Management Area
- Pheasant Run State Wildlife Management Area
- Scheuring State Wildlife Management Area
- Schweigert State Wildlife Management Area
- Sherwood State Wildlife Management Area
- Sportsman County Park
- Swessinger State Wildlife Management Area
- West Graham State Wildlife Management Area

== Geology ==
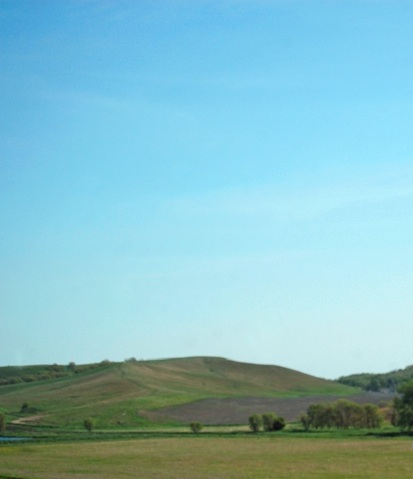
Buffalo Ridge

Nobles County sits atop the Buffalo Ridge, an expanse of rolling hills in southwestern Minnesota reaching a height of 1,995 ft (608 m) ASL. The Buffalo Ridge marks the most southerly extent of the last glaciation, and extends 60 miles (97 km) through Lincoln, Lyon, Pipestone, Murray, Rock, and Nobles Counties. It is a drainage divide separating the watersheds of the Mississippi and Missouri Rivers. Because of its elevation and constant winds, Buffalo Ridge has become a major site for wind energy. Over 200 wind turbines stand along the Ridge.

Buffalo Ridge is part of the inner coteau and is the highest point of the Coteau des Prairies in Minnesota. Its bedrock is formed of Cretaceous shale, sandstone, and clay that lie above the pinkish-red Upper Precambrian Sioux Quartzite. These units are covered in most areas by thick deposits of glacial drift, which consist of up to 800 ft (240 m) of pre-Wisconsin age glacial till left after the glaciers receded. The inner coteau is made up of extremely stream-eroded glacial deposits of pre-Wisconsin glacial drift, which is then covered by a 6-15' (1.8-4.6m) thick deposit of a wind-blown silt called loess. This covering results in the creation of an area with long, gently sloping hills. Loess is an easily eroded material, resulting in few lakes and wetlands in the inner coteau area. Loess however promotes well-established dendritic drainage networks flowing into the Missouri River and Minnesota River systems.

== Demographics ==
Historical population
Census	Pop.	Note	%±
1860	35		—
1870	117		234.3%
1880	4,435		3,690.6%
1890	7,958		79.4%
1900	14,932		87.6%
1910	15,210		1.9%
1920	17,917		17.8%
1930	18,618		3.9%
1940	21,215		13.9%
1950	22,435		5.8%
1960	23,365		4.1%
1970	23,208		−0.7%
1980	21,840		−5.9%
1990	20,098		−8.0%
2000	20,832		3.7%
2010	21,378		2.6%
2020	22,290		4.3%
2025 (est.)	22,338	▲	0.2%
U.S. Decennial Census; 1790-1960 1900-1990; 1990-2000 2010-2020

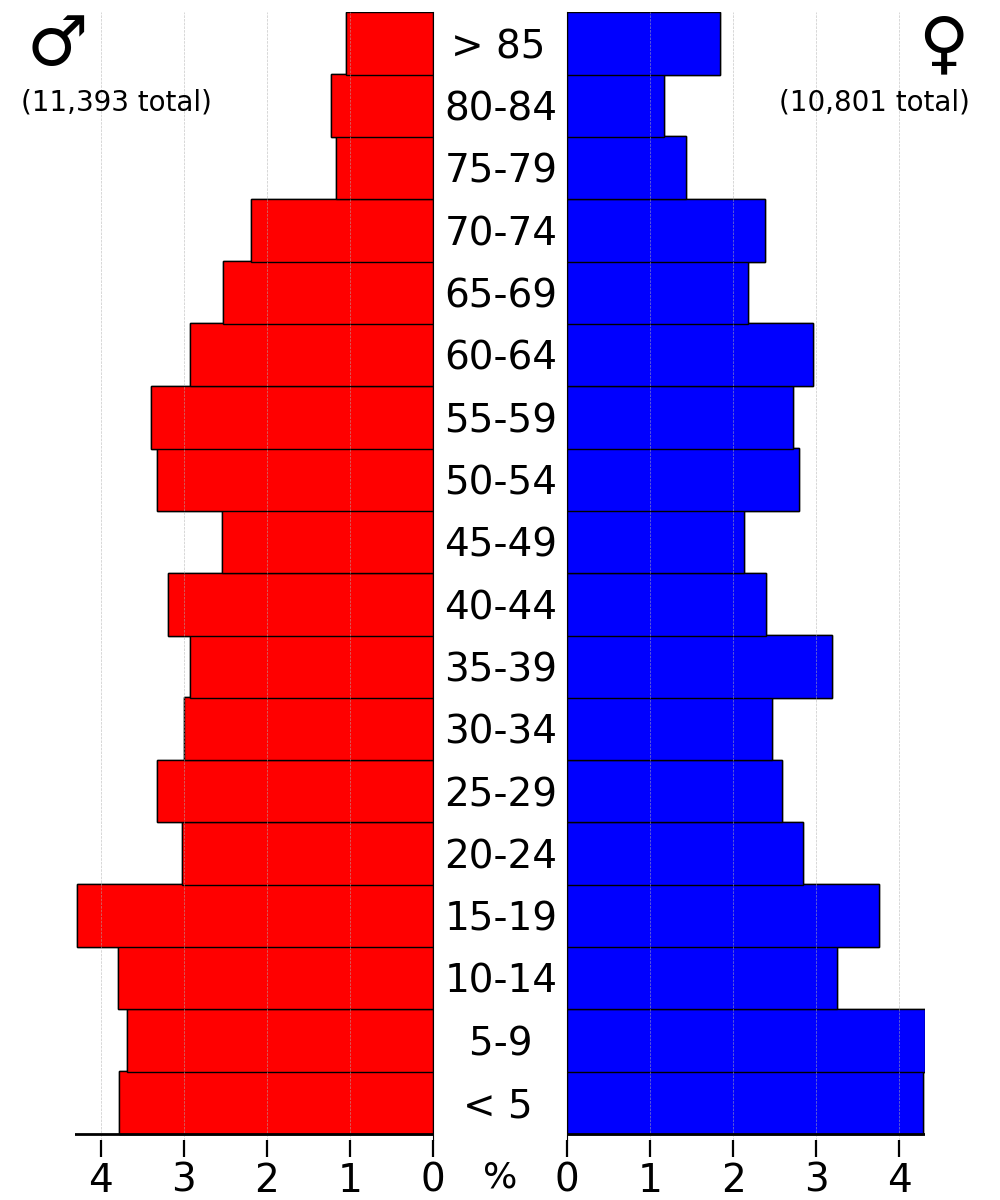
2022 US Census population pyramid for Nobles County, from ACS 5-year estimates

As of the first quarter of 2024, the median home value in Nobles County was $191,780.

As of the 2023 American Community Survey, there are 7,689 estimated households in Nobles County with an average of 2.82 persons per household. The county has a median household income of $62,973. Approximately 12.2% of the county's population lives at or below the poverty line. Nobles County has an estimated 66.2% employment rate, with 17.1% of the population holding a bachelor's degree or higher and 79.4% holding a high school diploma.

The top five reported ancestries (people were allowed to report up to two ancestries, thus the figures will generally add to more than 100%) were English (67.7%), Spanish (23.8%), Indo-European (0.4%), Asian and Pacific Islander (4.7%), and Other (3.4%).

=== Racial and ethnic composition ===
Nobles County, Minnesota – racial and ethnic composition
Note: the US Census treats Hispanic/Latino as an ethnic category. This table excludes Latinos from the racial categories and assigns them to a separate category. Hispanics/Latinos may be of any race.

Race / ethnicity (NH = non-Hispanic)	Pop. 1980	Pop. 1990	Pop. 2000	Pop. 2010	Pop. 2020
White alone (NH)	21,492 (98.41%)	19,318 (96.12%)	17,232 (82.72%)	14,365 (67.20%)	12,147 (54.50%)
Black or African American alone (NH)	30 (0.14%)	49 (0.24%)	212 (1.02%)	727 (3.40%)	978 (4.39%)
Native American or Alaska Native alone (NH)	52 (0.24%)	63 (0.31%)	42 (0.20%)	67 (0.31%)	66 (0.30%)
Asian alone (NH)	99 (0.45%)	399 (1.99%)	816 (3.92%)	1,144 (5.35%)	1,329 (5.96%)
Pacific Islander alone (NH)	—	—	0 (0.00%)	7 (0.03%)	41 (0.18%)
Other race alone (NH)	17 (0.08%)	7 (0.03%)	10 (0.05%)	25 (0.11%)	42 (0.19%)
Mixed race or multiracial (NH)	—	—	195 (0.94%)	223 (1.04%)	416 (1.87%)
Hispanic or Latino (any race)	150 (0.69%)	262 (1.30%)	2,325 (11.16%)	4,820 (22.55%)	7,271 (32.62%)
Total	21,840 (100.00%)	20,098 (100.00%)	20,832 (100.00%)	21,378 (100.00%)	22,290 (100.00%)

=== 2020 census ===
As of the 2020 census, the county had a population of 22,290. The median age was 34.9 years. 28.0% of residents were under the age of 18 and 16.4% of residents were 65 years of age or older. For every 100 females there were 102.9 males, and for every 100 females age 18 and over there were 103.6 males age 18 and over.

The racial makeup of the county was 58.8% White, 4.4% Black or African American, 2.1% American Indian and Alaska Native, 6.1% Asian, 0.2% Native Hawaiian and Pacific Islander, 19.6% from some other race, and 8.8% from two or more races. Hispanic or Latino residents of any race comprised 32.6% of the population.

61.9% of residents lived in urban areas, while 38.1% lived in rural areas.

There were 7,851 households in the county, of which 34.8% had children under the age of 18 living in them. Of all households, 51.7% were married-couple households, 19.6% were households with a male householder and no spouse or partner present, and 21.6% were households with a female householder and no spouse or partner present. About 25.8% of all households were made up of individuals and 11.9% had someone living alone who was 65 years of age or older.

There were 8,394 housing units, of which 6.5% were vacant. Among occupied housing units, 71.5% were owner-occupied and 28.5% were renter-occupied. The homeowner vacancy rate was 1.6% and the rental vacancy rate was 6.3%.

=== 2010 census ===
As of the 2010 census, there were 21,378 people, 7,946 households, and 5,431 families residing in the county. The population density was 29.9 inhabitants per square mile (11.5/km^{2}). There were 8,535 housing units at an average density of 11.9 inhabitants per square mile (4.6/km^{2}). The racial makeup of the county was 75.81% White, 3.48% African American, 0.52% Native American, 5.46% Asian, 0.05% Pacific Islander, 12.84% from some other races and 1.84% from two or more races. Hispanic or Latino people of any race were 22.55% of the population.

=== 2000 census ===
As of the 2000 census, there were 20,832 people, 7,939 households, and 5,517 families in the county. The population density was 29.1 inhabitants per square mile (11.2/km^{2}). There were 8,465 housing units at an average density of 11.8 inhabitants per square mile (4.6/km^{2}). The racial makeup of the county was 86.50% White, 1.07% African American, 0.31% Native American, 3.98% Asian, 0.07% Pacific Islander, 6.64% from some other races and 1.43% from two or more races. Hispanic or Latino people of any race were 11.16% of the population. 47.0% were of German, 8.3% Dutch and 8.0% Norwegian ancestry.

There were 7,939 households, out of which 32.10% had children under the age of 18 living with them, 58.80% were married couples living together, 6.90% had a female householder with no husband present, and 30.50% were non-families. 26.50% of all households were made up of individuals, and 14.10% had someone living alone who was 65 years of age or older. The average household size was 2.58 and the average family size was 3.11.

The county population contained with 26.50% under the age of 18, 8.20% from 18 to 24, 26.60% from 25 to 44, 21.30% from 45 to 64, and 17.40% who were 65 years of age or older. The median age was 38 years. For every 100 females there were 99.50 males. For every 100 females age 18 and over, there were 98.40 males.

The median income for a household in the county was $35,684, and the median income for a family was $43,076. Males had a median income of $27,853 versus $20,346 for females. The per capita income for the county was $16,987. About 8.20% of families and 11.70% of the population were below the poverty line, including 15.30% of those under age 18 and 12.50% of those age 65 or over.

== Communities ==
=== Cities ===
- Adrian
- Bigelow
- Brewster (named Hersey until August 1880)
- Dundee
- Ellsworth
- Kinbrae (named Airlie, then DeForest until August 1883)
- Lismore
- Round Lake
- Rushmore
- Wilmont
- Worthington (county seat. Site named Okabena until Autumn 1871)

=== Census-designated place ===
- Leota

=== Unincorporated communities ===
- Org (named Sioux Falls Junction until 1890)
- Pfingsten
- Ransom
- Reading
- St. Kilian

=== Townships ===
- Bigelow Township
- Bloom Township
- Dewald Township
- Elk Township
- Graham Lakes Township
- Grand Prairie Township
- Hersey Township
- Indian Lake Township
- Larkin Township
- Leota Township
- Lismore Township
- Little Rock Township
- Lorain Township
- Olney Township
- Ransom Township
- Seward Township
- Summit Lake Township
- Westside Township
- Wilmont Township
- Worthington Township

== Politics ==
Nobles County voters have tended to vote Republican in the past several decades. In 67% of national elections since 1980, the county has selected the Republican Party candidate (as of 2020).

United States presidential election results for Nobles County, Minnesota
Year	Republican		Democratic		Third party(ies)	
Year	No.	%	No.	%	No.	%
1892	894	44.24%	664	32.86%	463	22.91%
1896	1,568	54.84%	1,204	42.11%	87	3.04%
1900	1,709	57.68%	1,101	37.16%	153	5.16%
1904	1,732	70.52%	622	25.33%	102	4.15%
1908	1,432	56.78%	925	36.68%	165	6.54%
1912	605	20.78%	994	34.15%	1,312	45.07%
1916	1,413	50.39%	1,280	45.65%	111	3.96%
1920	4,420	79.64%	982	17.69%	148	2.67%
1924	2,835	46.10%	421	6.85%	2,894	47.06%
1928	3,676	56.01%	2,862	43.61%	25	0.38%
1932	2,417	35.35%	4,343	63.51%	78	1.14%
1936	2,601	32.22%	4,919	60.94%	552	6.84%
1940	5,104	56.34%	3,919	43.26%	36	0.40%
1944	4,149	54.61%	3,413	44.93%	35	0.46%
1948	3,203	38.21%	5,090	60.73%	89	1.06%
1952	6,340	65.25%	3,351	34.49%	26	0.27%
1956	5,196	56.23%	4,036	43.67%	9	0.10%
1960	5,636	53.20%	4,947	46.70%	11	0.10%
1964	3,517	35.31%	6,431	64.57%	12	0.12%
1968	4,451	44.04%	5,171	51.16%	485	4.80%
1972	4,951	47.04%	5,464	51.91%	110	1.05%
1976	4,503	41.95%	6,034	56.21%	198	1.84%
1980	4,706	45.40%	4,703	45.37%	956	9.22%
1984	4,876	50.77%	4,619	48.09%	110	1.15%
1988	4,348	46.28%	4,953	52.73%	93	0.99%
1992	3,548	35.73%	3,756	37.82%	2,626	26.45%
1996	3,769	41.60%	4,106	45.32%	1,186	13.09%
2000	4,766	53.72%	3,760	42.38%	346	3.90%
2004	5,159	56.05%	3,898	42.35%	147	1.60%
2008	4,368	49.56%	4,244	48.16%	201	2.28%
2012	4,581	53.77%	3,793	44.52%	146	1.71%
2016	5,299	61.39%	2,733	31.66%	600	6.95%
2020	5,600	64.26%	2,933	33.65%	182	2.09%
2024	5,541	66.96%	2,599	31.41%	135	1.63%

== See also ==
- National Register of Historic Places listings in Nobles County, Minnesota
- Nobles County Heritage Center
