= Larkin Township =

Larkin Township may refer to the following places in the United States:

- Larkin Charter Township, Michigan
- Larkin Township, Nobles County, Minnesota
