= Worthington Township =

Worthington Township may refer to the following townships in the United States:

- Worthington Township, Nobles County, Minnesota
- Worthington Township, Richland County, Ohio
