= Little Rock Township =

Little Rock Township may refer to the following townships in the United States:

- Little Rock Township, Kendall County, Illinois
- Little Rock Township, Nobles County, Minnesota
