= Org =

ORG, Org, org or .org may refer to:

== Businesses and organizations ==
- Organization, any structured social entity
- Org Music, an American independent music label
- ORG Records, a defunct UK music label associated with Organ magazine (1986–2008)
- Open Rights Group, a British digital rights campaign
- Oxford Research Group, a British geopolitical charity

== Places ==
- Org, Minnesota, United States
- Orange station (California), a bus/train hub in the United States
- Zorg en Hoop Airport, Suriname (IATA:ORG)

== File formats (.org) ==
- Org-mode, for note-taking in the Emacs editor
- Lotus Organizer, a discontinued personal information manager
- Origin (data analysis software), in graphing

== Other uses ==
- .org, a generic Internet top-level domain
- Overflow relief gully (ORG), a sewage overflow prevention fitting
- Oring language, spoken in Nigeria (ISO 639-3:org)
