= Lismore College =

Lismore College may refer to:

- Lismore High School, New South Wales, Australia
- Trinity Catholic College, Lismore, New South Wales, Australia
- Lismore Seminary, Scotland, United Kingdom
- Lismore College (Northern Ireland), Craigavon, Northern Ireland

== See also ==
- Lismore
