= Lismore, Minnesota =

City in Minnesota, United States

Lismore
- City
- Location of Lismore, Minnesota
- Coordinates: 43°44′57″N 95°56′53″W
- Country: United States
- State: Minnesota
- County: Nobles

Government
  - Type: Mayor - Council
  - Mayor: Andrew Fodness

Area
  - Total: 0.35 sq mi (0.90 km^{2})
  - Land: 0.35 sq mi (0.90 km^{2})
  - Water: 0 sq mi (0.00 km^{2})
- Elevation: 1,690 ft (520 m)

Population (2020)
  - Total: 202
  - Density: 578.5/sq mi (223.35/km^{2})
- Time zone: UTC-6 (Central (CST))
  - Summer (DST): UTC-5 (CDT)
- ZIP code: 56155
- Area code: 507
- FIPS code: 27-37412
- GNIS feature ID: 2395730
- Website: lismoremn.com

Lismore is a city in Nobles County, Minnesota, United States. As of the 2020 census, Lismore had a population of 202.

== Geography ==
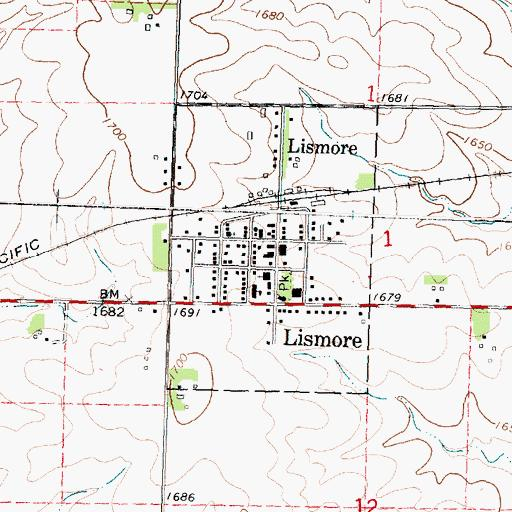
Lismore Topographic Map

According to the United States Census Bureau, the city has a total area of 0.36 square miles (0.93 km^{2}), all land. Lismore is situated on the western slope of the Buffalo Ridge, a drainage divide separating the Mississippi and Missouri River systems.

Main highways include:

- Minnesota State Highway 91
- Nobles County Road 16
- Nobles County Road 19

== History ==
Lismore street scene - 1903

Main Street, Lismore, Minnesota, 1908

Father C. J. Knauf played an important role in the settlement of Lismore

Lismore's St. Anthony Church, built in 1911, is shown in this 1953 postcard

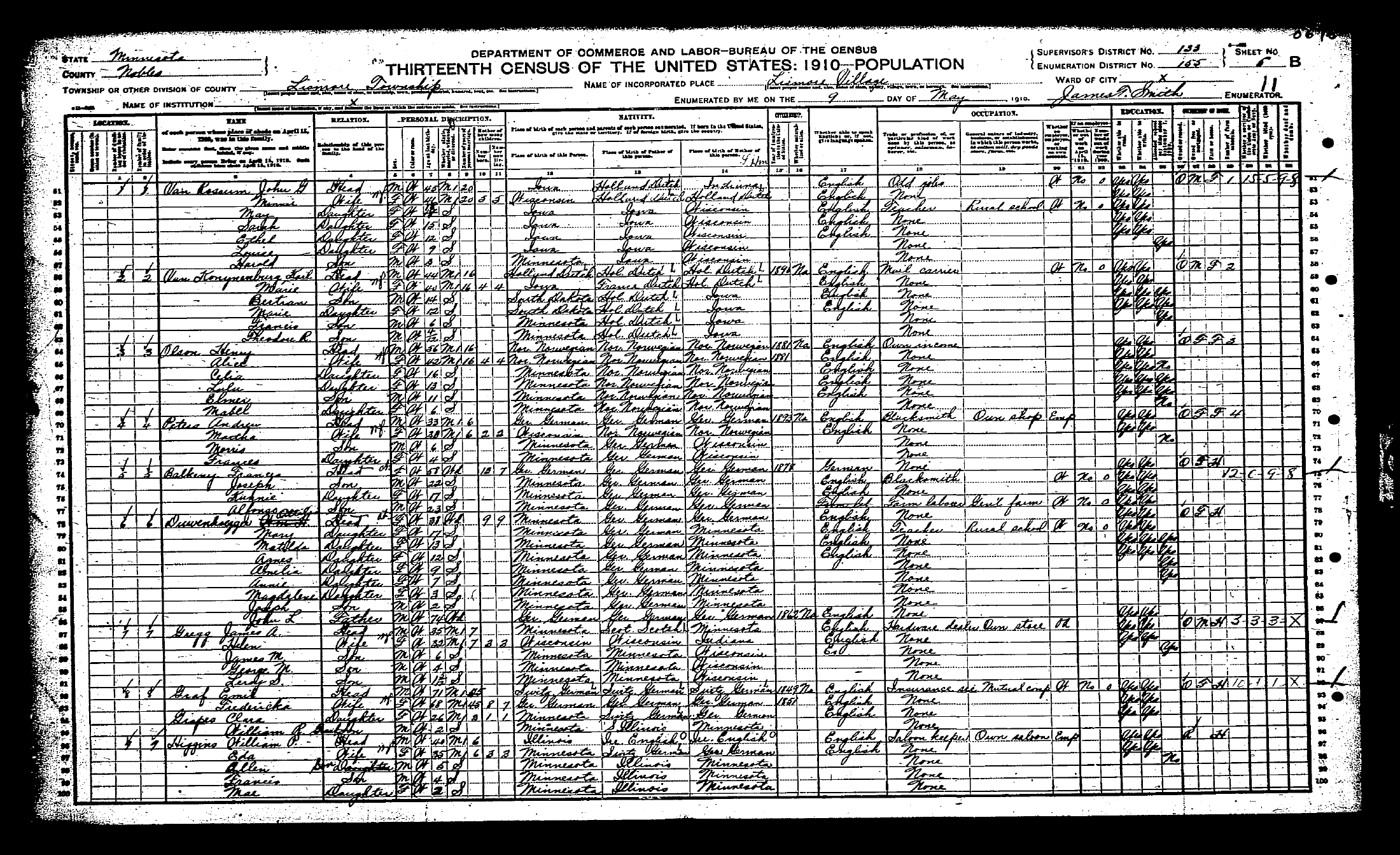
Lismore Census data - 1910

The town of Lismore was named after Lismore Township which, in turn, was named after a village in County Waterford, Ireland, noted for its beautiful castle. The name for Lismore Township was suggested by Father C. J. Knauf of Adrian.

Lismore owes its existence to the building of the Burlington Railroad through northeast Nobles County. The railroad established the towns of Reading and Wilmont in 1899. When the railroad reached present-day Lismore at 3:00 pm on Saturday, June 9, 1900, construction of the town immediately commenced.

The first business on site was the St. Croix Lumber company which sold its wares from a tent pitched next to a large pile of lumber hauled in from Wilmont. The first building in town was built by James Beacom and was used as a saloon. The second building in town was the O. B. Bratager store building. James Montgomery started a small grain elevator, and James Ramage opened a lumber yard and hardware store under the management of Arch Priest. The Bank of Lismore opened its doors on September 1, 1900, and was incorporated as the State Bank of Lismore three months later. A livery stable, a butcher shop, a restaurant, and a blacksmith shop were also opened in that first year. A school house, churches, several businesses, and many residences were constructed in 1901.

On December 6, 1901, the Lismore Leader was able to boast:

Lismore, for a place only a little over one year old, has made good and substantial growth... Lismore has one bank, two general merchants, one furniture store, two saloons, two pool rooms, two lumber yards, three elevators, four coal dealers, one hotel, one hardware store, two machinery firms, one blacksmith shop, one livery stable, one dray line, and one newspaper.

A census taken on April 10, 1902, showed a population of 186. The town was quickly incorporated, and its first municipal council meeting took place on June 17, 1902, with Emil Graf selected as president. Lismore's population in the 2000 census was 238.

Lismore, Minnesota was a course in Need for Speed: The Run.

== Demographics ==
Historical population
Census	Pop.	Note	%±
1910	268		—
1920	350		30.6%
1930	325		−7.1%
1940	311		−4.3%
1950	317		1.9%
1960	306		−3.5%
1970	323		5.6%
1980	276		−14.6%
1990	248		−10.1%
2000	238		−4.0%
2010	227		−4.6%
2020	202		−11.0%
U.S. Decennial Census

=== 2010 census ===
As of the census of 2010, there were 227 people, 96 households, and 64 families residing in the city. The population density was 630.6 inhabitants per square mile (243.5/km^{2}). There were 107 housing units at an average density of 297.2 per square mile (114.7/km^{2}). The racial makeup of the city was 96.0% White and 4.0% African American. Hispanic or Latino of any race were 0.9% of the population.

There were 96 households, of which 26.0% had children under the age of 18 living with them, 54.2% were married couples living together, 6.3% had a female householder with no husband present, 6.3% had a male householder with no wife present, and 33.3% were non-families. 27.1% of all households were made up of individuals, and 16.7% had someone living alone who was 65 years of age or older. The average household size was 2.36 and the average family size was 2.92.

The median age in the city was 44.1 years. 24.2% of residents were under the age of 18; 6.6% were between the ages of 18 and 24; 20.7% were from 25 to 44; 26% were from 45 to 64; and 22.5% were 65 years of age or older. The gender makeup of the city was 48.9% male and 51.1% female.

=== 2000 census ===
As of the census of 2000, there were 238 people, 97 households, and 58 families residing in the city. The population density was 696.9 inhabitants per square mile (269.1/km^{2}). There were 103 housing units at an average density of 301.6 per square mile (116.4/km^{2}). The racial makeup of the city was 97.48% White, 0.42% Asian, and 2.10% from two or more races. Hispanic or Latino of any race were 0.84% of the population.

There were 97 households, out of which 28.9% had children under the age of 18 living with them, 56.7% were married couples living together, 3.1% had a female householder with no husband present, and 39.2% were non-families. 36.1% of all households were made up of individuals, and 21.6% had someone living alone who was 65 years of age or older. The average household size was 2.45 and the average family size was 3.32.

In the city, the population was spread out, with 28.6% under the age of 18, 5.5% from 18 to 24, 27.3% from 25 to 44, 18.1% from 45 to 64, and 20.6% who were 65 years of age or older. The median age was 39 years. For every 100 females, there were 95.1 males. For every 100 females age 18 and over, there were 95.4 males.

The median income for a household in the city was $24,773, and the median income for a family was $40,139. Males had a median income of $27,083 versus $14,722 for females. The per capita income for the city was $12,623. About 16.9% of families and 19.8% of the population were below the poverty line, including 29.1% of those under the age of eighteen and 13.6% of those 65 or over.

== Politics ==
Lismore is located in Minnesota's 1st congressional district, represented by Brad Finstad, a Republican. At the state level, Lismore is located in Senate District 22, represented by Republican Bill Weber, and in House District 22A, represented by Republican Joe Schomacker.

=== Local politics ===
The mayor of Lismore is Wayne Bents. City council members are Ryan Schieck, Cliff Altman, Kathryn Weber, and Kris Weidert. The city of Lismore is located in Lismore Township is represented by Nobles County Commissioner Gene Metz.
