= Ransom Township, Nobles County, Minnesota =

Ransom Township, Minnesota
- Township
- Location within the state of Minnesota Ransom Township, Minnesota (the United States)
- Coordinates: 43°32′19″N 95°45′51″W
- Country: United States
- State: Minnesota
- County: Nobles

Area
  - Total: 36.4 sq mi (94.2 km^{2})
  - Land: 36.4 sq mi (94.2 km^{2})
  - Water: 0 sq mi (0.0 km^{2})
- Elevation: 1,600 ft (500 m)

Population (2000)
  - Total: 271
  - Density: 7.5/sq mi (2.9/km^{2})
- Time zone: UTC-6 (Central (CST))
  - Summer (DST): UTC-5 (CDT)
- FIPS code: 27-53152
- GNIS feature ID: 0665379

Ransom Township is a township in Nobles County, Minnesota, United States. The population was 271 at the 2000 census.

== Geography ==
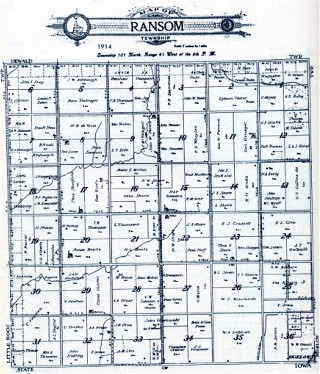
Plat Map of Ransom Township, Minnesota - 1914

Ransom Humiston, namesake of Ransom Township

According to the United States Census Bureau, the township has a total area of 36.4 square miles (94.2 km^{2}), all land. The main geographic feature of Ransom Township is a small segment of the Little Rock Creek found in the western portions of the township.

Main highways include:

- Nobles County Road 4
- Nobles County Road 6
- Nobles County Road 13

== History ==
Organization of Ransom Township was approved by the Nobles County Board on September 3, 1872. It was originally called Grant Township after former General, and then presidential candidate, Ulysses S. Grant. Many of the pioneer settlers were Union Army veterans and this name had wide support. However, the county board was informed by the state auditor's office that another Grant Township existed in Washington County, Minnesota. Thus, on July 10, 1873, the name was officially changed to Ransom Township in honor of Ransom Humiston, agent for the National Colony, which brought large groups of settlers to Worthington from 1872 until 1876. Township residents were not consulted on the name change. Grant Township in Washington County was broken up and absorbed among neighboring townships in 1919. However, the small town of Grant, Minnesota, still exists in the same vicinity.

== Demographics ==
As of the census of 2000, there were 271 people, 99 households, and 86 families residing in the township. The population density was 7.5 people per square mile (2.9/km^{2}). There were 112 housing units at an average density of 3.1/sq mi (1.2/km^{2}). The racial makeup of the township was 99.63% White, and 0.37% from two or more races.

There were 99 households, out of which 38.4% had children under the age of 18 living with them, 75.8% were married couples living together, 6.1% had a female householder with no husband present, and 13.1% were non-families. 11.1% of all households were made up of individuals, and 6.1% had someone living alone who was 65 years of age or older. The average household size was 2.74 and the average family size was 2.93.

In the township the population was spread out, with 26.2% under the age of 18, 5.9% from 18 to 24, 27.7% from 25 to 44, 19.6% from 45 to 64, and 20.7% who were 65 years of age or older. The median age was 40 years. For every 100 females, there were 115.1 males. For every 100 females age 18 and over, there were 119.8 males.

The median income for a household in the township was $39,250, and the median income for a family was $41,250. Males had a median income of $26,750 versus $24,375 for females. The per capita income for the township was $13,801. About 4.5% of families and 10.1% of the population were below the poverty line, including 11.1% of those under the age of eighteen and 6.9% of those 65 or over.

== Politics ==
Ransom Township is located in Minnesota's 1st congressional district, represented by Mankato educator Tim Walz, a Democrat. At the state level, Ransom Township is located in Senate District 22, represented by Republican Doug Magnus, and in House District 22A, represented by Republican Joe Schomacker.

== Local politics ==
Ransom Township is represented by Nobles County Commissioner Matt Widboom.
