= Westside Township, Nobles County, Minnesota =

Westside Township, Minnesota
- Township
- Location within the state of Minnesota Westside Township, Minnesota (the United States)
- Coordinates: 43°37′36″N 95°59′16″W
- Country: United States
- State: Minnesota
- County: Nobles

Area
  - Total: 35.3 sq mi (91.4 km^{2})
  - Land: 35.3 sq mi (91.4 km^{2})
  - Water: 0 sq mi (0.0 km^{2})
- Elevation: 1,486 ft (453 m)

Population (2000)
  - Total: 258
  - Density: 7.3/sq mi (2.8/km^{2})
- Time zone: UTC-6 (Central (CST))
  - Summer (DST): UTC-5 (CDT)
- FIPS code: 27-69718
- GNIS feature ID: 0665971

Westside Township is a township in Nobles County, Minnesota, United States. The population was 258 at the 2000 census.

== Geography ==
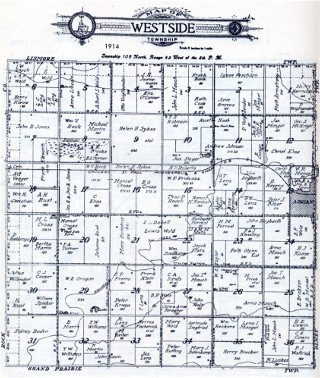
Map of Westside Township - 1914

According to the United States Census Bureau, the township has a total area of 35.3 square miles (91.4 km^{2}), all land. The main geographic feature of Westside Township is the Kanaranzi Creek which bisects the township from the northeast to southwest corners.

Main highways include:

- Interstate 90
- Minnesota State Highway 91
- Nobles County Road 19
- Nobles County Road 35

== History ==
Organization of Westside Township was approved by the Nobles County Board on February 6, 1877. The first township meeting was held on February 24, 1877. The western half of the city of Adrian lies within Westside Township. This township lies on Nobles County's western border, hence the name Westside Township.

== Demographics ==
As of the census of 2000, there were 258 people, 84 households, and 74 families residing in the township. The population density was 7.3 people per square mile (2.8/km^{2}). There were 88 housing units at an average density of 2.5/sq mi (1.0/km^{2}). The racial makeup of the township was 96.90% White and 3.10% Asian. Hispanic or Latino of any race were 4.65% of the population.

There were 84 households, out of which 48.8% had children under the age of 18 living with them, 78.6% were married couples living together, 7.1% had a female householder with no husband present, and 11.9% were non-families. 10.7% of all households were made up of individuals, and 6.0% had someone living alone who was 65 years of age or older. The average household size was 3.07 and the average family size was 3.34.

In the township the population was spread out, with 32.6% under the age of 18, 7.0% from 18 to 24, 28.7% from 25 to 44, 22.9% from 45 to 64, and 8.9% who were 65 years of age or older. The median age was 34 years. For every 100 females, there were 109.8 males. For every 100 females age 18 and over, there were 97.7 males.

The median income for a household in the township was $47,500, and the median income for a family was $49,063. Males had a median income of $30,125 versus $19,861 for females. The per capita income for the township was $15,518. About 12.3% of families and 16.8% of the population were below the poverty line, including 22.1% of those under the age of eighteen and 37.5% of those 65 or over.

== Politics ==
Westside Township is located in Minnesota's 1st congressional district, represented by Mankato educator Tim Walz, a Democrat. At the state level, Westside Township is located in Senate District 22, represented by Republican Doug Magnus, and in House District 22A, represented by Republican Joe Schomacker.

== Local politics ==
Westside Township is represented by Nobles County Commissioner Gene Metz.
