= Elk Township, Nobles County, Minnesota =

Elk Township, Minnesota
- Township
- Location within the state of Minnesota Elk Township, Minnesota (the United States)
- Coordinates: 43°42′38″N 95°38′30″W
- Country: United States
- State: Minnesota
- County: Nobles

Area
  - Total: 36.1 sq mi (93.5 km^{2})
  - Land: 36.1 sq mi (93.5 km^{2})
  - Water: 0 sq mi (0.0 km^{2})
- Elevation: 1,588 ft (484 m)

Population (2000)
  - Total: 284
  - Density: 7.8/sq mi (3/km^{2})
- Time zone: UTC-6 (Central (CST))
  - Summer (DST): UTC-5 (CDT)
- FIPS code: 27-18602
- GNIS feature ID: 0664067

Elk Township is a township in Nobles County, Minnesota, United States. The population was 284 at the 2000 census.

== Geography ==
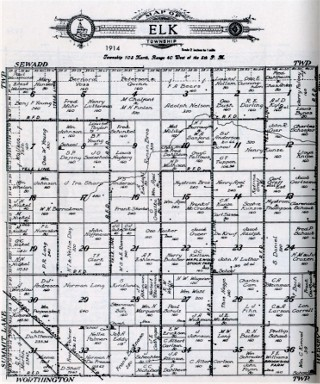
Map of Elk Township - 1914

According to the United States Census Bureau, the township has a total area of 36.1 square miles (93 km^{2}), all land. The major geographic feature of Elk Township is the Elk Creek which flows eastward into the Des Moines River system. A second and separate Elk Creek exists within Nobles County and flows westward toward the Big Sioux River system.

Main highways include:

- U.S. Highway 59
- Nobles County Road 7
- Nobles County Road 14
- Nobles County Road 16

== History ==
Organization of Elk Township was approved on September 16, 1872.

== Demographics ==
As of the census of 2000, there were 284 people, 102 households, and 87 families residing in the township. The population density was 7.9 inhabitants per square mile (3.1/km^{2}). There were 107 housing units at an average density of 3.0 per square mile (1.2/km^{2}). The racial makeup of the township was 96.83% White, 0.35% Native American, 1.76% Asian, 0.35% from other races, and 0.70% from two or more races. Hispanic or Latino of any race were 0.35% of the population.

There were 102 households, out of which 38.2% had children under the age of 18 living with them, 76.5% were married couples living together, 4.9% had a female householder with no husband present, and 14.7% were non-families. 12.7% of all households were made up of individuals, and 5.9% had someone living alone who was 65 years of age or older. The average household size was 2.78 and the average family size was 3.02.

In the township the population was spread out, with 28.2% under the age of 18, 6.0% from 18 to 24, 23.9% from 25 to 44, 27.8% from 45 to 64, and 14.1% who were 65 years of age or older. The median age was 40 years. For every 100 females, there were 100.0 males. For every 100 females age 18 and over, there were 112.5 males.

The median income for a household in the township was $39,464, and the median income for a family was $40,781. Males had a median income of $25,000 versus $19,167 for females. The per capita income for the township was $16,785. About 3.3% of families and 8.6% of the population were below the poverty line, including 15.1% of those under the age of eighteen and none of those 65 or over.

== Politics ==
Elk Township is located in Minnesota's 1st congressional district, represented by Mankato educator Tim Walz, a Democrat. At the state level, Elk Township is located in Senate District 22, represented by Republican Doug Magnus, and in House District 22A, represented by Republican Joe Schomacker.

== Local politics ==
Elk Township is represented by Nobles County Commissioner Marvin Zylstra
