= Worthington Township, Nobles County, Minnesota =

Worthington Township
- Township
- Location in the state of Minnesota Worthington Township (the United States)
- Coordinates: 43°37′51″N 95°38′01″W
- Country: United States
- State: Minnesota
- County: Nobles

Area
  - Total: 28.6 sq mi (74.1 km^{2})
  - Land: 28.6 sq mi (74.1 km^{2})
  - Water: 0 sq mi (0.0 km^{2})
- Elevation: 1,631 ft (497 m)

Population (2000)
  - Total: 316
  - Density: 28/sq mi (11/km^{2})
- Time zone: UTC-6 (Central (CST))
  - Summer (DST): UTC-5 (CDT)
- ZIP code: 56187
- Area code: 507
- FIPS code: 27-71752
- GNIS feature ID: 666053

Worthington Township is a township in Nobles County, Minnesota, United States. The population was 316 at the 2000 census.

== Geography ==
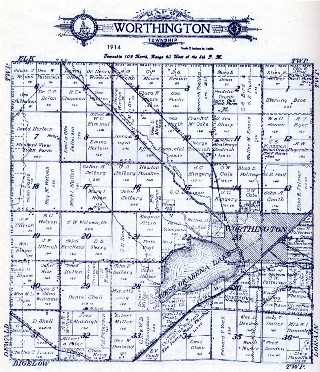
Map of Worthington Township - 1914

Map of Nobles County in 1882

Main Street, Worthington - 1895

According to the United States Census Bureau, the township has a total area of 28.6 square miles (74.1 km^{2}), all land. The main geographic feature in Worthington Township is Lake Okabena. Okabena means "home of the heron" is the Sioux language.

Main highways include:

- Interstate 90
- U.S. Highway 59
- Minnesota State Highway 60
- Minnesota State Highway 266 (Nobles County Road 25)
- Nobles County Road 5
- Nobles County Road 7
- Nobles County Road 10
- Nobles County Road 12
- Nobles County Road 35

== History ==
Organization of Worthington Township was approved by the Nobles County Board on April 30, 1872. The first township meeting was held on May 20, 1872. Petitioners requested the name Worthington from the town that was emerging within the township border. The town of Worthington was named in honor of the mother-in-law of Dr. Aaron P. Miller, one of the town's founding fathers.

== Demographics ==
The following figures refer to those individuals residing within Worthington Township, but outside of the borders of the city of Worthington. As of the census of 2000, there were 316 people, 127 households, and 100 families residing in the township. The population density was 11.0 people per square mile (4.3/km^{2}). There were 132 housing units at an average density of 4.6/sq mi (1.8/km^{2}). The racial makeup of the township was 99.05% White, 0.32% from other races, and 0.63% from two or more races. Hispanic or Latino of any race were 0.63% of the population.

There were 127 households, out of which 29.9% had children under the age of 18 living with them, 75.6% were married couples living together, 2.4% had a female householder with no husband present, and 20.5% were non-families. 19.7% of all households were made up of individuals, and 7.9% had someone living alone who was 65 years of age or older. The average household size was 2.49 and the average family size was 2.85.

In the township the population was spread out, with 23.7% under the age of 18, 3.8% from 18 to 24, 21.5% from 25 to 44, 34.8% from 45 to 64, and 16.1% who were 65 years of age or older. The median age was 46 years. For every 100 females, there were 103.9 males. For every 100 females age 18 and over, there were 99.2 males.

The median income for a household in the township was $41,000, and the median income for a family was $44,167. Males had a median income of $35,536 versus $19,063 for females. The per capita income for the township was $19,390. About 5.6% of families and 4.0% of the population were below the poverty line, including none of those under the age of 18 or 65 and older.

== Politics ==
Worthington Township is located in Minnesota's 1st congressional district, represented by Mankato educator Tim Walz, a Democrat. At the state level, Worthington Township is located in Senate District 22, represented by Republican Doug Magnus, and in House District 22B, represented by Republican Rod Hamilton.

== Local politics ==
At the county level, representation of Worthington Township is divided between Nobles County Commissioners Marvin Zylstra, Matt Widboom, Robert Demuth. Jr., and Verne Lestico.
