= Bloom Township, Nobles County, Minnesota =

Bloom Township, Minnesota
- Township
- Location within the state of Minnesota Bloom Township, Minnesota (the United States)
- Coordinates: 43°48′44″N 95°44′34″W
- Country: United States
- State: Minnesota
- County: Nobles

Area
  - Total: 35.9 sq mi (92.9 km^{2})
  - Land: 35.8 sq mi (92.7 km^{2})
  - Water: 0.077 sq mi (0.2 km^{2})
- Elevation: 1,657 ft (505 m)

Population (2000)
  - Total: 213
  - Density: 6.0/sq mi (2.3/km^{2})
- Time zone: UTC-6 (Central (CST))
  - Summer (DST): UTC-5 (CDT)
- FIPS code: 27-06508
- GNIS feature ID: 0663615

Bloom Township is a township in Nobles County, Minnesota, United States. The population was 213 at the 2000 census.

== Geography ==
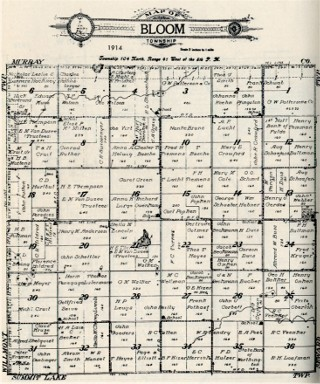
Map of Bloom Township - 1914

According to the United States Census Bureau, the township has a total area of 35.9 square miles (93 km^{2}), of which 35.8 square miles (93 km^{2}) is land and 0.1 square miles (0.26 km^{2}) (0.20%) is water. The major geographic feature in Bloom Township is Jack Creek which flows from the western township border to the eastern township border, ultimately emptying into the Des Moines River system. A separate and distinct Jack Creek also exists within Nobles County and flows westward toward the Big Sioux River system.

Main highways include:

- Nobles County Road 13
- Nobles County Road 16
- Nobles County Road 18

== History ==
Organization of Bloom Township was approved by the Nobles County Board on March 18, 1879. The original choice of name for the township was Afton. However, the Nobles County Board was notified by the state auditor's office that another Afton Township existed in Washington County, Minnesota. The name was then changed to Bloom Township in honor of Peter Bloom, the township's first settler. Afton Township in Washington County no longer exists, having been absorbed by the city of Afton, Minnesota, in 1971.

== Demographics ==
As of the census of 2000, there were 213 people, 64 households, and 57 families residing in the township. The population density was 6.0 inhabitants per square mile (2.3/km^{2}). There were 69 housing units at an average density of 1.9 per square mile (0.73/km^{2}). The racial makeup of the township was 99.06% White, 0.47% African American, 0.47% from other races. Hispanic or Latino of any race were 3.76% of the population.

There were 64 households, out of which 43.8% had children under the age of 18 living with them, 87.5% were married couples living together, and 10.9% were non-families. 7.8% of all households were made up of individuals, and 1.6% had someone living alone who was 65 years of age or older. The average household size was 3.33 and the average family size was 3.49.

In the township the population was spread out, with 29.6% under the age of 18, 12.7% from 18 to 24, 28.2% from 25 to 44, 24.9% from 45 to 64, and 4.7% who were 65 years of age or older. The median age was 34 years. For every 100 females, there were 124.2 males. For every 100 females age 18 and over, there were 134.4 males.

The median income for a household in the township was $50,536, and the median income for a family was $51,429. Males had a median income of $27,045 versus $20,625 for females. The per capita income for the township was $15,171. None of the families and 1.3% of the population were living below the poverty line.

== Politics ==
Bloom Township is located in Minnesota's 1st congressional district, represented by Jim Hagedorn, a Republican. At the state level, Bloom Township is located in Senate District 22, represented by Republican Bill Weber, and in House District 22A, represented by Republican Joe Schomacker.

== Local politics ==
Bloom Township is represented by Nobles County Commissioner Gene Metz.
