= Brewster, Minnesota =

City in Minnesota, United States

Brewster
- City
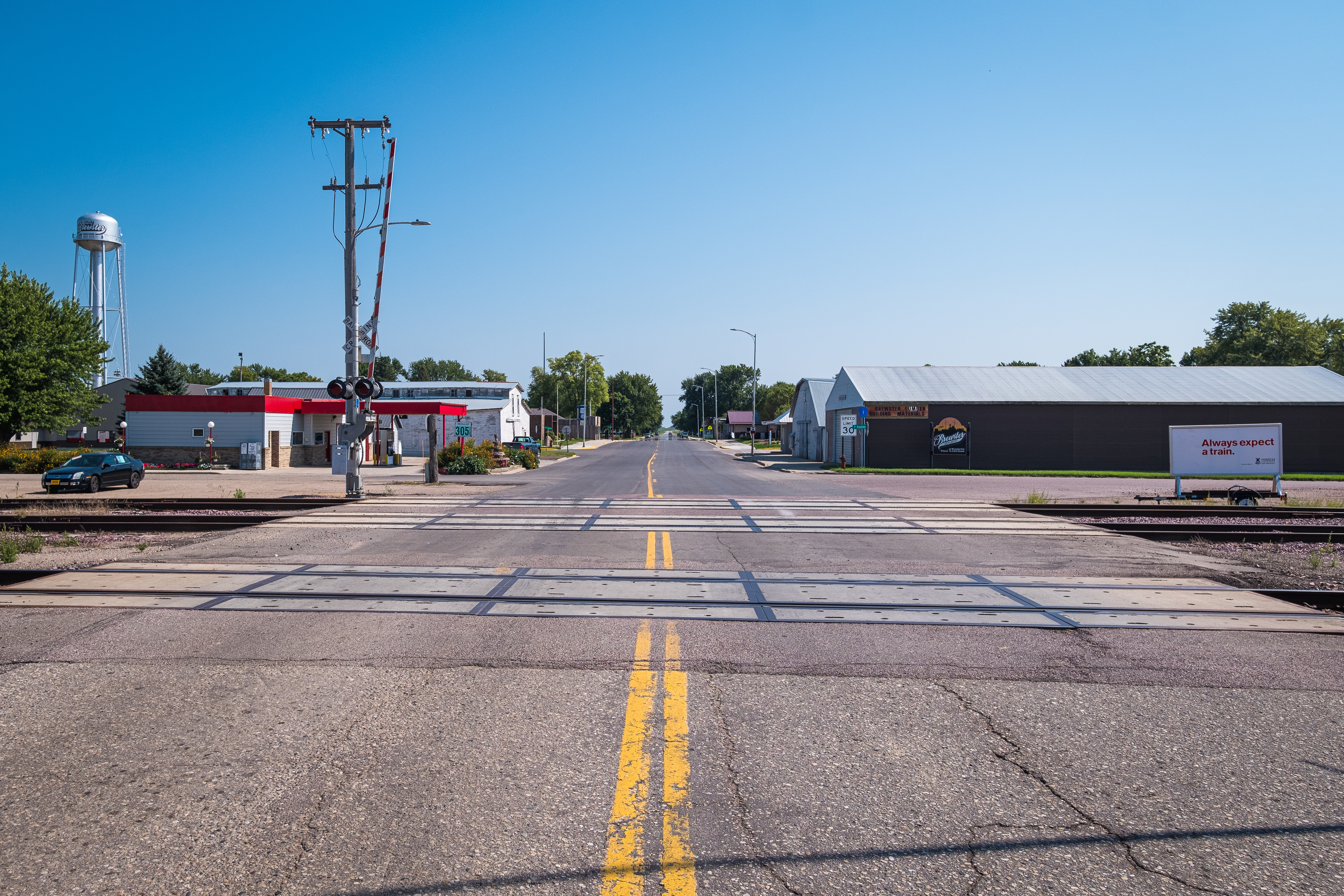

- Location of Brewster, Minnesota
- Coordinates: 43°41′50″N 95°27′52″W
- Country: United States
- State: Minnesota
- County: Nobles

Government
  - Type: Mayor - Council
  - Mayor: Randy Schmitz

Area
  - Total: 1.39 sq mi (3.59 km^{2})
  - Land: 1.39 sq mi (3.59 km^{2})
  - Water: 0 sq mi (0.00 km^{2})
- Elevation: 1,483 ft (452 m)

Population (2020)
  - Total: 506
  - Density: 365.4/sq mi (141.09/km^{2})
- Time zone: UTC-6 (Central (CST))
  - Summer (DST): UTC-5 (CDT)
- ZIP code: 56119
- Area code: 507
- FIPS code: 27-07660
- GNIS feature ID: 2393412
- Website: https://www.brewstermn.us/

Brewster is a city in Nobles County, Minnesota, United States. The population was 506 at the 2020 census.

== Geography ==
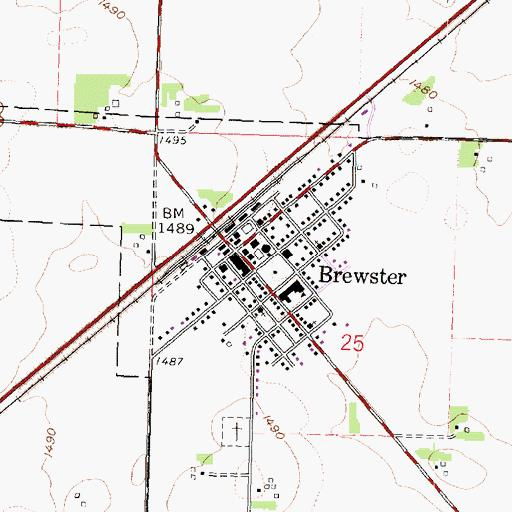
Topographic map of Brewster, MN

According to the United States Census Bureau, the city has a total area of 1.36 square miles (3.52 km^{2}), all land. It is located one-half mile from the Jackson County line, on section 25 of Hersey Township. The population was 502 at the 2000 census.

Main highways include:

- Minnesota State Highway 60
- Nobles County Road 1
- Nobles County Road 14

== History ==
First public school in Brewster, Minnesota

Bank and General Store, Brewster, Minnesota

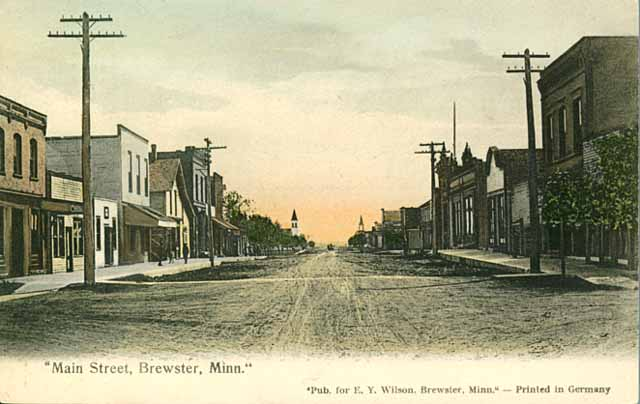
Brewster Postcard 1908

Founding of Brewster: The town of Brewster was in established in the spring of 1872, but was known for many years as Hersey. It was the first town established in Nobles County by the St. Paul and Sioux City Railroad, and was named after General Samuel F. Hersey, a lumber baron from Maine, and one of the railroad's directors. The first resident was W. R. Bennett, who came to take charge of the railroad station. T. J. Smith put up the first store which was run by A. J. Timlin for many years. Mr. A. O. Conde established a lumber yard and a grain business, Martin Heiser opened a second store, a hotel was opened by a Mr. Humphrey, and John Iverson established a blacksmith shop. All of this occurred in 1872, the same year that A. J. Timlin became postmaster.

Source of name: In 1880, the St. Paul and Sioux City Railroad was purchased by the Chicago, St. Paul, Minneapolis and Omaha Railway, or the Omaha Road, and there was already a station named Hersey on the latter road's track in Wisconsin. In order to avoid confusion, the name of Hersey was changed, briefly to Nobles County Station. Soon thereafter, the name Brewster was settled upon. There is some confusion regarding the choice of name. E. F. Drake, president of the St. Paul and Sioux City Railroad once stated that the name "was changed to Brewster after a director of the Omaha Road." But a brochure later put out by the Chicago and North Western Railway Company stated that "the present name was given in honor of Brewster, a town in Barnstable County, Massachusetts, which was named in honor of Elder William Brewster, one of the first settlers of Plymouth Colony."

Incorporation: By the fall of 1898, it was found that 180 people lived in the community of Brewster. Thus it was decided that the time had come for incorporation. An election was held on December 14, 1898, and out of the 28 ballots cast, only one was opposed to idea of municipal government. On January 9, 1899, Leon Morris assumed duties as the first president of Brewster Village.

== Demographics ==
Historical population
Census	Pop.	Note	%±
1900	234		—
1910	311		32.9%
1920	405		30.2%
1930	396		−2.2%
1940	467		17.9%
1950	478		2.4%
1960	500		4.6%
1970	563		12.6%
1980	559		−0.7%
1990	532		−4.8%
2000	502		−5.6%
2010	473		−5.8%
2020	506		7.0%
U.S. Decennial Census

=== 2010 census ===
As of the census of 2010, there were 473 people, 207 households, and 130 families residing in the city. The population density was 347.8 inhabitants per square mile (134.3/km^{2}). There were 218 housing units at an average density of 160.3 per square mile (61.9/km^{2}). The racial makeup of the city was 95.3% White, 0.2% African American, 1.3% Native American, 2.7% from other races, and 0.4% from two or more races. Hispanic or Latino of any race were 5.3% of the population.

There were 207 households, of which 30.4% had children under the age of 18 living with them, 47.3% were married couples living together, 9.2% had a female householder with no husband present, 6.3% had a male householder with no wife present, and 37.2% were non-families. 34.8% of all households were made up of individuals, and 16.9% had someone living alone who was 65 years of age or older. The average household size was 2.29 and the average family size was 2.95.

The median age in the city was 39.5 years. 27.3% of residents were under the age of 18; 5.7% were between the ages of 18 and 24; 24.3% were from 25 to 44; 28% were from 45 to 64; and 14.8% were 65 years of age or older. The gender makeup of the city was 49.9% male and 50.1% female.

=== 2000 census ===
As of the census of 2000, there were 502 people, 204 households, and 138 families residing in the city. The population density was 417.9 inhabitants per square mile (161.4/km^{2}). There were 218 housing units at an average density of 181.5 per square mile (70.1/km^{2}). The racial makeup of the city was 97.01% White, 0.40% Native American, 0.20% Asian, 1.99% from other races, and 0.40% from two or more races. Hispanic or Latino of any race were 2.19% of the population.

There were 204 households, out of which 33.8% had children under the age of 18 living with them, 53.9% were married couples living together, 7.4% had a female householder with no husband present, and 31.9% were non-families. 28.9% of all households were made up of individuals, and 18.6% had someone living alone who was 65 years of age or older. The average household size was 2.46 and the average family size was 3.01.

In the city, the population was spread out, with 26.3% under the age of 18, 7.4% from 18 to 24, 29.3% from 25 to 44, 21.1% from 45 to 64, and 15.9% who were 65 years of age or older. The median age was 35 years. For every 100 females, there were 103.2 males. For every 100 females age 18 and over, there were 100.0 males.

The median income for a household in the city was $38,125, and the median income for a family was $44,625. Males had a median income of $28,229 versus $22,019 for females. The per capita income for the city was $16,263. About 6.5% of families and 10.8% of the population were below the poverty line, including 9.1% of those under age 18 and 27.1% of those age 65 or over.

== Politics ==
Brewster is located in Minnesota's 1st congressional district, represented by Jim Hagedorn, a Republican. At the state level, Brewster is located in Senate District 22, represented by Republican Bill Weber, and in House District 22A, represented by Republican Joe Schomacker.

== Local politics ==
The mayor of Brewster is Randy Schmitz. City council members are Mike Bourquin, Ed Busch, John Garmer and Andy Bedbury. Brewster is located in Hersey Township and is represented by Nobles County Commissioner Marvin Zylstra.
