= Ransom, Minnesota =

Ransom
- Unincorporated community
- Location within the state of Minnesota
- Coordinates: 43°32′38″N 95°47′39″W
- Country: United States
- State: Minnesota
- County: Nobles
- Elevation: 1,621 ft (494 m)
- Time zone: UTC-6 (Central (CST))
  - Summer (DST): UTC-5 (CDT)
- Area code: 507
- GNIS feature ID: 654896

Ransom is an unincorporated community in Nobles County, Minnesota, United States.
