= Bishop of Lismore =

Bishop of Lismore may refer to:

- The Bishop of Lismore, Ireland, a separate episcopal title which took its name after the town of Lismore in County Waterford, Ireland
  - The Bishop of Waterford and Lismore, the successor bishopric
- The Bishop of Lismore, an alternative name for the Bishop of Argyll, Scotland
- The Bishop of the Roman Catholic Diocese of Lismore, New South Wales, Australia
