= Hersey Township, Nobles County, Minnesota =

Hersey Township, Minnesota
- Township
- Location within the state of Minnesota Hersey Township, Minnesota (the United States)
- Coordinates: 43°42′24″N 95°30′11″W
- Country: United States
- State: Minnesota
- County: Nobles

Area
  - Total: 35.1 sq mi (90.9 km^{2})
  - Land: 35.1 sq mi (90.9 km^{2})
  - Water: 0 sq mi (0.0 km^{2})
- Elevation: 1,510 ft (460 m)

Population (2000)
  - Total: 257
  - Density: 7.3/sq mi (2.8/km^{2})
- Time zone: UTC-6 (Central (CST))
  - Summer (DST): UTC-5 (CDT)
- FIPS code: 27-28736
- GNIS feature ID: 0664463

Hersey Township is a township in Nobles County, Minnesota, United States. The population was 257 at the 2000 census.

== Geography ==
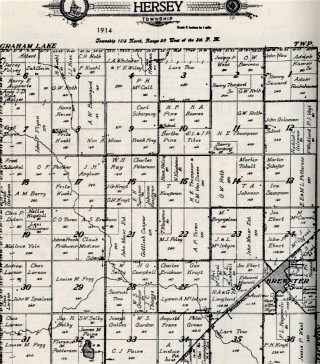
Map of Hersey Township - 1914

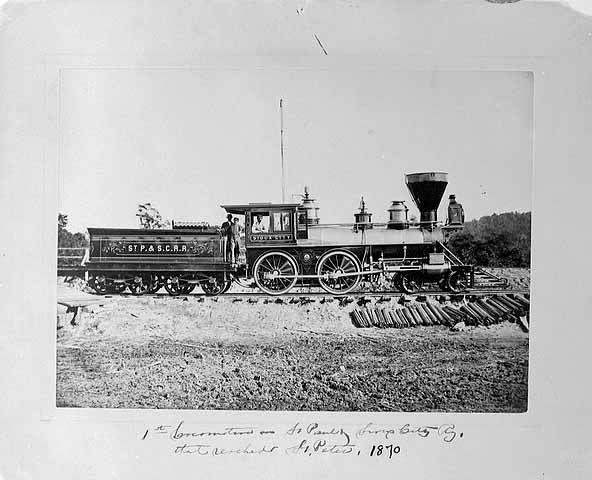
First Train to reach Hersey Township

According to the United States Census Bureau, the township has a total area of 35.1 square miles (91 km^{2}), all land. The main geographic feature of Hersey Township is the Elk Creek which cuts eastward through the county, eventually flowing into the Des Moines River system. (A separate and distinct Elk Creek also exists in Nobles County. This second Elk Creek flows westward, eventually joining the Big Sioux River system.)

Main highways include:

- Minnesota State Highway 60
- Nobles County Road 1
- Nobles County Road 3
- Nobles County Road 14

== History ==
Organization of Hersey Township was approved by the Nobles County Board on May 30, 1872. The first township meeting was held on June 11, 1872. Organization occurred shortly after tracks of the St Paul & Sioux City railroad reached Nobles County. The township was named after Samuel Freeman Hersey. Hersey served as a U.S. Congressman from Maine, and also held title to 34,000 acres (140 km^{2}) of timberland in the St. Croix River valley. He was named to the board of directors of the St. Paul and Sioux City Railroad Company, and served in that capacity when the railroad reached Nobles County.

== Demographics ==
As of the census of 2000, there were 257 people, 83 households, and 73 families residing in the township. The population density was 7.3 inhabitants per square mile (2.8/km^{2}). There were 87 housing units at an average density of 2.5 per square mile (0.97/km^{2}). The racial makeup of the township was 99.22% White, 0.39% from other races, and 0.39% from two or more races. Hispanic or Latino of any race were 0.39% of the population.

There were 83 households, out of which 48.2% had children under the age of 18 living with them, 83.1% were married couples living together, 1.2% had a female householder with no husband present, and 12.0% were non-families. 10.8% of all households were made up of individuals, and 4.8% had someone living alone who was 65 years of age or older. The average household size was 3.10 and the average family size was 3.34.

In the township the population was spread out, with 32.7% under the age of 18, 8.2% from 18 to 24, 32.3% from 25 to 44, 17.1% from 45 to 64, and 9.7% who were 65 years of age or older. The median age was 36 years. For every 100 females, there were 93.2 males. For every 100 females age 18 and over, there were 108.4 males.

The median income for a household in the township was $39,500, and the median income for a family was $44,375. Males had a median income of $34,583 versus $16,250 for females. The per capita income for the township was $14,843. About 5.6% of families and 10.0% of the population were below the poverty line, including 7.6% of those under the age of eighteen and 13.2% of those 65 or over.

== Politics ==
Hersey Township is located in Minnesota's 1st congressional district, represented by Mankato educator Tim Walz, a Democrat. At the state level, Hersey Township is located in Senate District 22, represented by Republican Doug Magnus, and in House District 22A, represented by Republican Joe Schomacker.

== Local politics ==
Hersey Township is represented by Nobles County Commissioner Marvin Zylstra.
