= Little Rock Township, Nobles County, Minnesota =

Little Rock Township, Minnesota
- Township
- Location within the state of Minnesota Little Rock Township, Minnesota (the United States)
- Coordinates: 43°32′10″N 95°51′50″W
- Country: United States
- State: Minnesota
- County: Nobles

Area
  - Total: 36.0 sq mi (93.2 km^{2})
  - Land: 36.0 sq mi (93.2 km^{2})
  - Water: 0 sq mi (0.0 km^{2})
- Elevation: 1,581 ft (482 m)

Population (2000)
  - Total: 260
  - Density: 7.3/sq mi (2.8/km^{2})
- Time zone: UTC-6 (Central (CST))
  - Summer (DST): UTC-5 (CDT)
- FIPS code: 27-37682
- GNIS feature ID: 0664805

Little Rock Township is a township in Nobles County, Minnesota, United States. The population was 260 at the 2000 census.

== Geography ==
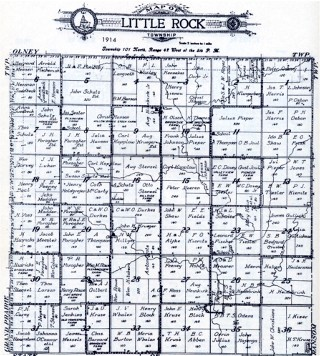
Map of Little Rock Township - 1914

According to the United States Census Bureau, the township has a total area of 36.0 square miles (93.2 km^{2}), all land. The main geographic features of Little Rock Township are the Little Rock River and the Little Rock Creek.

Main highways include:

- Minnesota State Highway 91
- Nobles County Road 6
- Nobles County Road 15
- Nobles County Road 17
- Nobles County Road 30

== History ==
Organization of Little Rock Township was approved by the Nobles County Board on September 3, 1872. On Joseph Nicollet's original 1842 map of the region, the Blue Mound near present-day Luverne is simply designated as The Rock. The river that flows near it was known by the Indians as Inyan Reakah, or River of the Rock. We know this as the Rock River. Little Rock Township gets its name from the Little Rock River that flows through the township and is one of the major tributaries of the Rock River.

== Demographics ==
As of the census of 2000, there were 260 people, 89 households, and 72 families residing in the township. The population density was 7.2 inhabitants per square mile (2.8/km^{2}). There were 92 housing units at an average density of 2.6 per square mile (1.0/km^{2}). The racial makeup of the township was 99.23% White and 0.77% Asian.

There were 89 households, out of which 40.4% had children under the age of 18 living with them, 76.4% were married couples living together, 3.4% had a female householder with no husband present, and 19.1% were non-families. 18.0% of all households were made up of individuals, and 7.9% had someone living alone who was 65 years of age or older. The average household size was 2.92 and the average family size was 3.35.

In the township the population was spread out, with 33.5% under the age of 18, 6.9% from 18 to 24, 26.2% from 25 to 44, 21.2% from 45 to 64, and 12.3% who were 65 years of age or older. The median age was 33 years. For every 100 females, there were 124.1 males. For every 100 females age 18 and over, there were 113.6 males.

The median income for a household in the township was $35,125, and the median income for a family was $37,250. Males had a median income of $30,938 versus $17,500 for females. The per capita income for the township was $14,970. About 10.3% of families and 15.8% of the population were below the poverty line, including 17.4% of those under the age of eighteen and 7.1% of those 65 or over.

== Politics ==
Little Rock Township is located in Minnesota's 1st congressional district, represented by Mankato educator Tim Walz, a Democrat. At the state level, Little Rock Township is located in Senate District 22, represented by Republican Doug Magnus, and in House District 22A, represented by Republican Joe Schomacker.

== Local politics ==
Little Rock Township is represented by Nobles County Commissioner Gene Metz
