= Larkin Township, Nobles County, Minnesota =

Larkin Township, Minnesota
- Township
- Location within the state of Minnesota Larkin Township, Minnesota (the United States)
- Coordinates: 43°42′37″N 95°51′47″W
- Country: United States
- State: Minnesota
- County: Nobles

Area
  - Total: 35.8 sq mi (92.7 km^{2})
  - Land: 35.8 sq mi (92.7 km^{2})
  - Water: 0.039 sq mi (0.1 km^{2})
- Elevation: 1,600 ft (500 m)

Population (2000)
  - Total: 218
  - Density: 6.2/sq mi (2.4/km^{2})
- Time zone: UTC-6 (Central (CST))
  - Summer (DST): UTC-5 (CDT)
- FIPS code: 27-35666
- GNIS feature ID: 0664730

Larkin Township is a township in Nobles County, Minnesota, United States. The population was 218 at the 2000 census.

== Geography ==
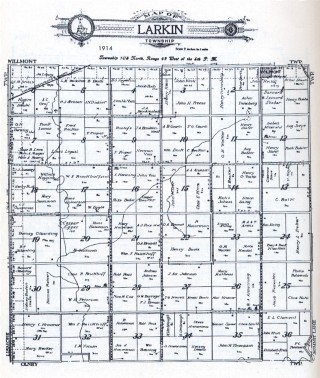
Map of Larkin Township - 1914

According to the United States Census Bureau, the township has a total area of 35.8 square miles (93 km^{2}), of which 35.8 square miles (93 km^{2}) is land and 0.04 square miles (0.10 km^{2}) (0.08%) is water. The major geographic features in Larkin Township include the Buffalo Ridge, the drainage divide between the Mississippi and Missouri River systems. The north branch of the Kanaranzi Creek is also located in Larkin Township.

Main highways include:

- Minnesota State Highway 91
- Nobles County Road 14
- Nobles County Road 15

== History ==
Organization of Larkin Township was approved by the Nobles County Board on March 27, 1883. It was the last of Nobles County's townships to be organized. Petitioners had proposed the name Grove Township and were angered that the Nobles County Board chose the name Larkin. The township was named for John Larkin, late brother-in-law of county commissioner Maurice O'Hearn (and brother of Ann Larkin O'Hearn). The rationale at the time centered on the supposedly pivotal role John Larkin had played in supporting Bishop John Ireland's Catholic colonization efforts in southwestern Minnesota; however, little evidence exists that Larkin played any major role.

== Demographics ==
As of the census of 2000, there were 218 people, 75 households, and 60 families residing in the township. The population density was 6.1 inhabitants per square mile (2.4/km^{2}). There were 80 housing units at an average density of 2.2 per square mile (0.85/km^{2}). The racial makeup of the township was 100.00% White.

There were 75 households, out of which 37.3% had children under the age of 18 living with them, 77.3% were married couples living together, and 20.0% were non-families. 18.7% of all households were made up of individuals, and 12.0% had someone living alone who was 65 years of age or older. The average household size was 2.91 and the average family size was 3.35.

In the township the population was spread out, with 31.2% under the age of 18, 5.5% from 18 to 24, 25.2% from 25 to 44, 23.4% from 45 to 64, and 14.7% who were 65 years of age or older. The median age was 35 years. For every 100 females, there were 107.6 males. For every 100 females age 18 and over, there were 108.3 males.

The median income for a household in the township was $31,875, and the median income for a family was $38,750. Males had a median income of $21,364 versus $17,188 for females. The per capita income for the township was $13,805. About 13.8% of families and 15.8% of the population were below the poverty line, including 20.3% of those under the age of eighteen and 27.9% of those 65 or over.

== Politics ==
Larkin Township is located in Minnesota's 1st congressional district, represented by Mankato educator Tim Walz, a Democrat. At the state level, Larkin Township is located in Senate District 22, represented by Republican Doug Magnus, and in House District 22A, represented by Republican Joe Schomacker.

== Local politics ==
Larkin Township is represented by Nobles County Commission Gene Metz
