= Bigelow Township, Nobles County, Minnesota =

Bigelow Township, Minnesota
- Township
- Location within the state of Minnesota Bigelow Township, Minnesota (the United States)
- Coordinates: 43°33′20″N 95°38′47″W
- Country: United States
- State: Minnesota
- County: Nobles

Area
  - Total: 36.3 sq mi (93.9 km^{2})
  - Land: 34.5 sq mi (89.3 km^{2})
  - Water: 1.8 sq mi (4.6 km^{2})
- Elevation: 1,598 ft (487 m)

Population (2000)
  - Total: 384
  - Density: 11/sq mi (4.3/km^{2})
- Time zone: UTC-6 (Central (CST))
  - Summer (DST): UTC-5 (CDT)
- ZIP code: 56117
- Area code: 507
- FIPS code: 27-05662
- GNIS feature ID: 0663584

Bigelow Township is a township in Nobles County, Minnesota, United States. The population was 384 at the 2000 census.

== Geography ==
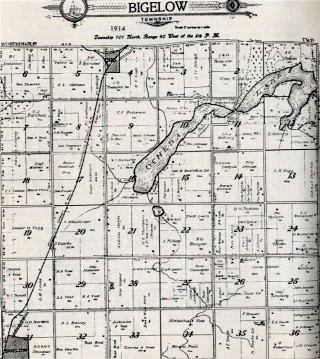
Map of Bigelow Township, 1914

According to the United States Census Bureau, the township has a total area of 36.2 square miles (94 km^{2}), of which 34.5 square miles (89 km^{2}) is land and 1.8 square miles (4.7 km^{2}) (4.91%) is water. A major geographic feature in Bigelow Township is the Buffalo Ridge, a drainage divide between the Mississippi and Missouri River systems. Lake Bella and the western part of Lake Ocheda are found within Bigelow Township. In addition, the Ocheyedan River and one branch of the Little Rock River both originate in Bigelow Township.

Main highways include:

- U.S. Highway 59
- Minnesota State Highway 60
- Nobles County Road 4
- Nobles County Road 6

== History ==
Rural School #31, Bigelow Township, circa 1905

Organization of Bigelow Township was approved by the Nobles County Board on April 30, 1872. The first township meeting was held May 20, 1872. Residents petitioned for the township to be named Ocheda, after Lake Ocheda, much of which lies within the township. However, the Nobles County Board named the township Bigelow, after the newly formed village of Bigelow which lies within the township. The village of Bigelow was named after Charles Bigelow, one of the directors of the St. Paul and Sioux City Railway Company.

== Demographics ==
As of the census of 2000, there were 384 people, 132 households, and 114 families residing in the township. The population density was 11.1 inhabitants per square mile (4.3/km^{2}). There were 139 housing units at an average density of 4.0 per square mile (1.5/km^{2}). The racial makeup of the township was 97.92% White, 2.08% from other races. Hispanic or Latino of any race were 2.08% of the population.

There were 132 households, out of which 37.1% had children under the age of 18 living with them, 81.1% were married couples living together, 2.3% had a female householder with no husband present, and 12.9% were non-families. 12.9% of all households were made up of individuals, and 7.6% had someone living alone who was 65 years of age or older. The average household size was 2.91 and the average family size was 3.16.

In the township the population was spread out, with 29.9% under the age of 18, 7.3% from 18 to 24, 22.1% from 25 to 44, 27.1% from 45 to 64, and 13.5% who were 65 years of age or older. The median age was 40 years. For every 100 females, there were 108.7 males. For every 100 females age 18 and over, there were 106.9 males.

The median income for a household in the township was $42,083, and the median income for a family was $43,611. Males had a median income of $27,292 versus $18,125 for females. The per capita income for the township was $16,373. About 5.4% of families and 5.4% of the population were below the poverty line, including 7.6% of those under age 18 and none of those age 65 or over.

== Politics ==
Bigelow Township is located in Minnesota's 1st congressional district, represented by Brad Finstad, a Republican. At the state level, Bigelow Township is located in Senate District 22, represented by Republican Bill Weber, and in House District 22B, represented by Republican Rod Hamilton.

== Local politics ==
Bigelow Township is represented by Nobles County Commissioner Matt Widboom.
