= Nobles County Heritage Center =

Museum in Worthington, Minnesota

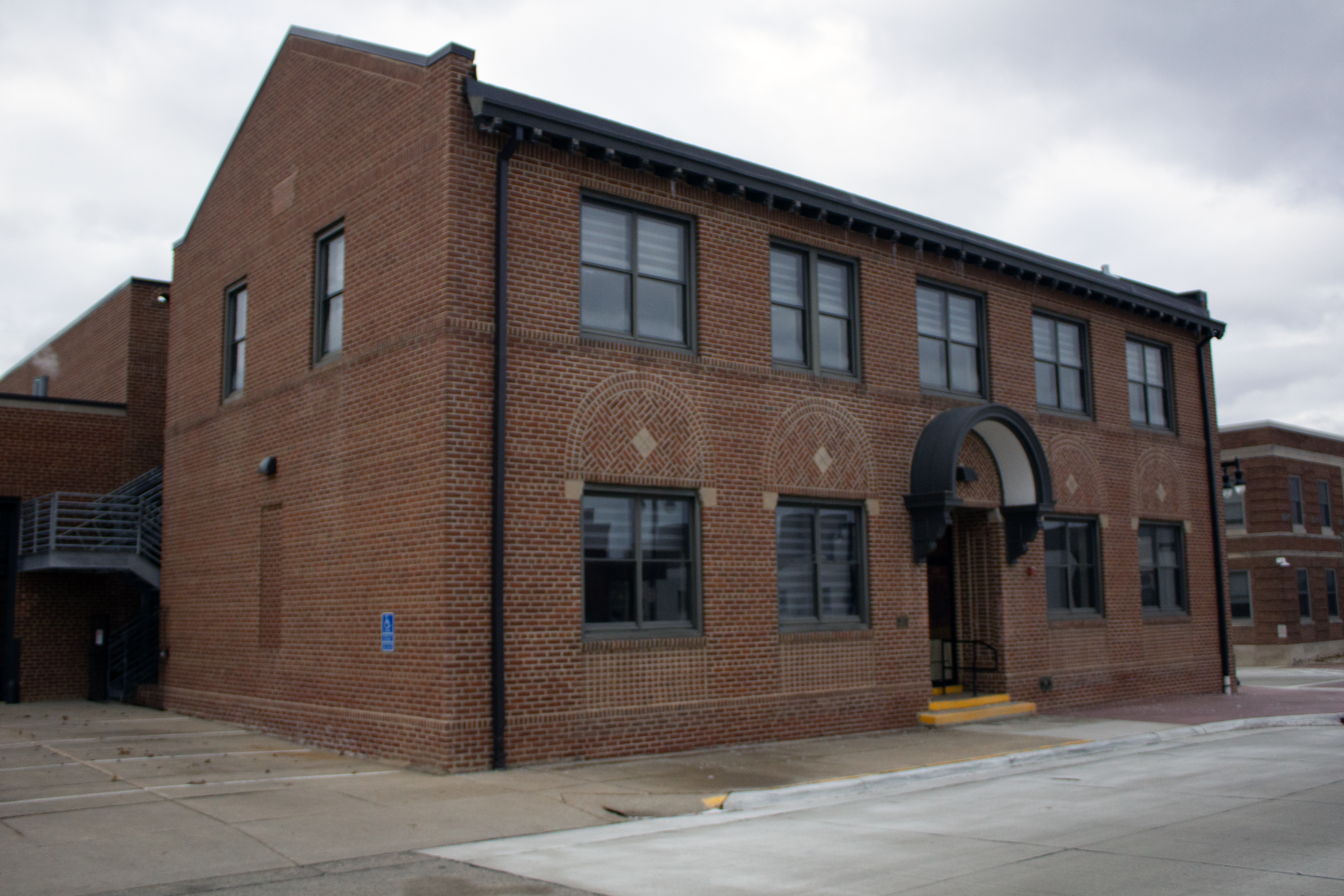
- Exterior of the museum
- Established: 2021
- Location: 225 9th Street Worthington, Minnesota 56187
- Type: Local history
- Executive director: Beth Rickers
- Website: noblescountyhistory.org

- Worthington Armory
- U.S. National Register of Historic Places
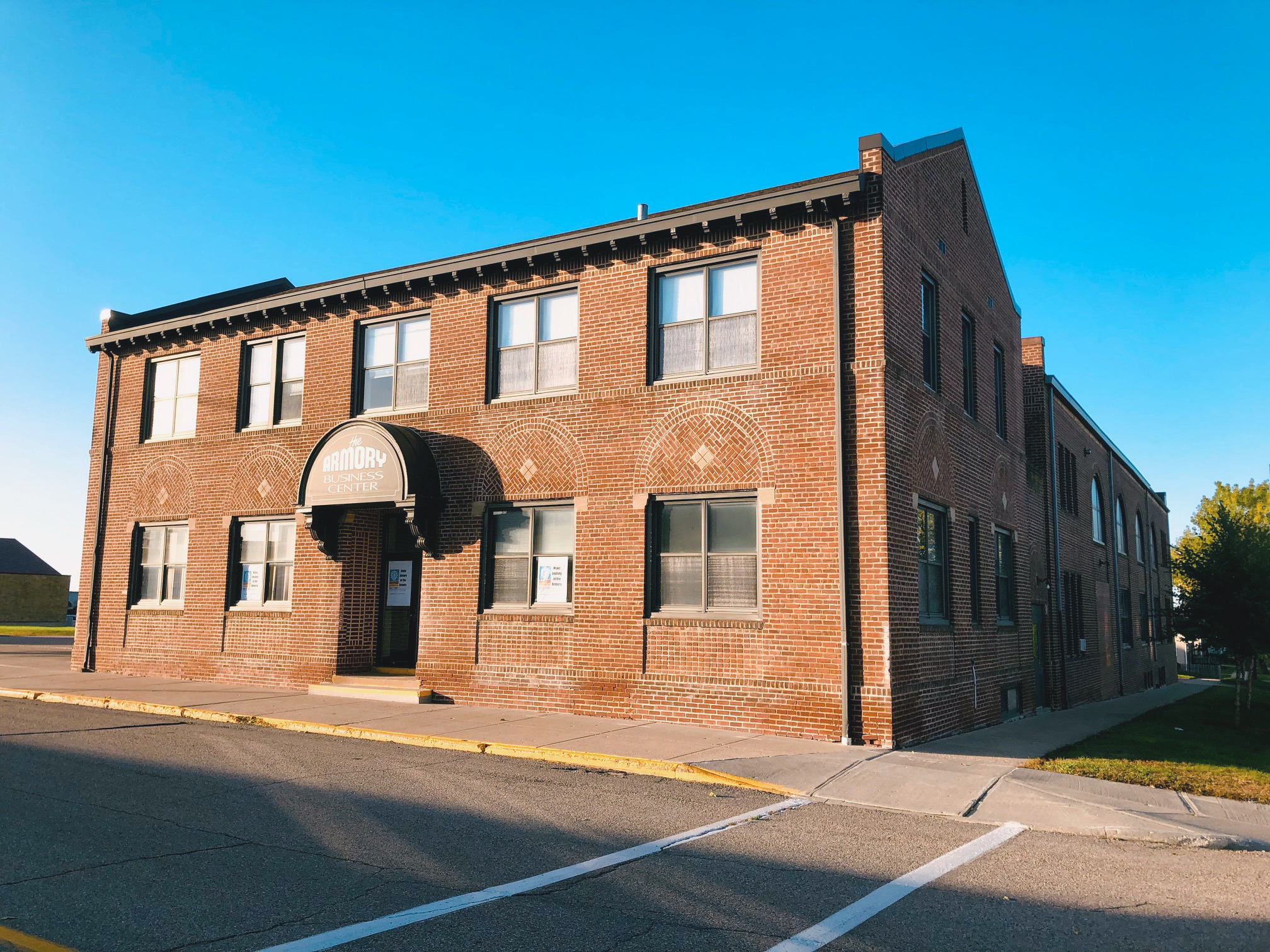
- Location: 225 9th Street Worthington, Minnesota 56187
- Area: Less than one acre
- Built: 1922
- Architect: Lang, Raugland & Lewis
- NRHP reference No.: 100001844
- Added to NRHP: November 27, 2017

The Nobles County Heritage Center, located in Worthington, Minnesota, is a cultural institution owned and operated by the Nobles County Historical Society, dedicated to preserving and sharing the history of Nobles County. Housed within the historic Worthington Armory, the Center serves as a repository for historical artifacts, documents, and archives.

== Exhibits and Collections ==
The center offers a variety of exhibits that explore different aspects of the county's history as well as traveling exhibits focusing on state and national history. Visitors can learn about the early pioneers who settled the land, the agricultural heritage of the region, and the social and cultural development of Nobles County over time. The center's permanent and rotating exhibits showcase the extensive collection of artifacts, photographs, documents, and textiles donated to the Nobles County Historical Society.

== Research ==
The center is also a resource for researchers interested in the local history of the community. Their collection comprises donations from local individuals, families, and businesses, including self-published family histories, biographies, genealogical documents, manuscripts, church records, marriage records, county records, and various other materials. The Society staff is available to assist researchers and answer questions about Nobles County's past.

== Programs ==
The Center actively engages with the community through educational programs, lectures, and workshops. The center also serves as a venue for community events and gatherings.

== Nobles County Historical Society ==
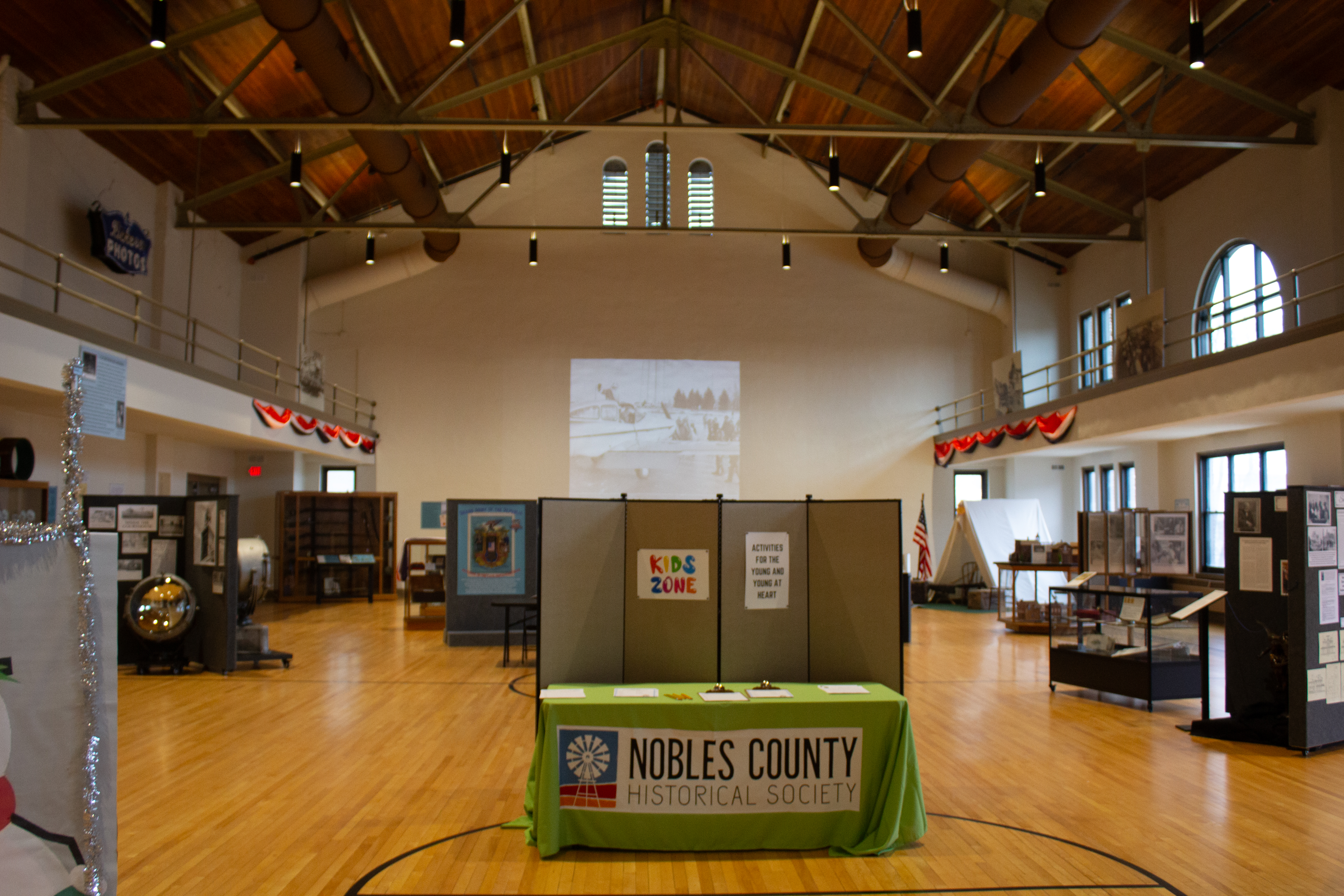
Gallery/Auditorium

The Nobles County Historical Society (NCHS) originated from an Old Settlers Picnic held on Sept. 10, 1933, at the Chautauqua Pavilion in Worthington. Plans quickly unfolded to preserve and showcase historical articles and papers of significance. Initially, space in the courthouse was allocated to store and exhibit a few small artifacts, while others were scattered throughout the county, awaiting a permanent home.

The artifact collection shifted among different locations until 1962 when a museum was established in the lower level of the Nobles County Library. In 1996, the library underwent renovations, resulting in a 40% reduction in museum space. Despite the growing collection of artifacts, NCHS faced limitations in exhibiting them or offering programming to local residents.

NCHS embarked on renovating the historic 100-year-old Worthington Armory building into the new Nobles County Heritage Center. The Armory has been restored and converted for use as a museum with modern updates. NCHS successfully relocated its offices to this new space in late 2021.

The Society also operates the Nobles County Pioneer Village, an outdoor living history museum that is open seasonally. It features a collection of historic buildings, including a one-room schoolhouse, a blacksmith shop, and a general store.

== Worthington Armory ==
The armory was constructed in 1922. The architectural style is typically classified as Beaux Arts, reflecting a period of interest in classical Greek and Roman forms. The building served as a training facility for the National Guard for many decades and also played a role as a community center, hosting events and celebrations.

== Transformation from Armory to Heritage Center ==
In the late 20th century, the National Guard no longer required the armory. Facing potential demolition, the Nobles County Historical Society stepped in. Recognizing the building's historical significance, the Society undertook a project to renovate the armory and transform it into the Nobles County Heritage Center. The renovations were completed in 2021, successfully preserving the historical character of the structure while incorporating modern updates to enhance accessibility and functionality.

== See also ==
- National Register of Historic Places listings in Nobles County, Minnesota
- List of museums in Minnesota
