= Lake Okabena =

Lake in the state of Minnesota, United States

- Sailboarding on Lake Okabena

- Location within Minnesota Location within the United States

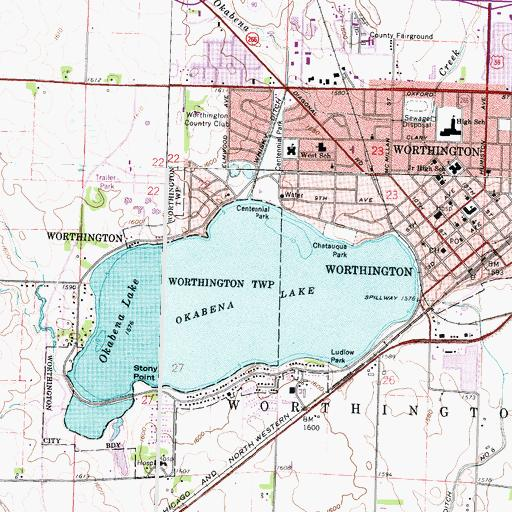
- Topographic Map of Lake Okabena
- Location: Nobles County, Minnesota
- Coordinates: 43°37′00″N 95°37′00″W
- Lake type: Glacial lake
- Max. length: 1.25 miles (2.01 km)
- Max. width: 1 mile (1.6 km)
- Surface area: 776 acres (314 ha)
- Average depth: 6.9 ft (2.1 m)
- Max. depth: 15.3 ft (4.7 m)
- Water volume: 224,464,680 cu ft (6,356,132 m^{3})
- Shore length^{1}: 5.5 miles (8.9 km)
- Surface elevation: 478.5 m (1,570 ft)
- Settlements: Worthington, MN
- ^{1} Shore length is not a well-defined measure.

Top: Surveyor's map - 1868 Bottom: Location of railroad tracks - 1884

Idlewild Pavilion - Located on eastern shore of West Lake Okabena

The Effie, a steamboat that operated on Lake Okabena in the 1890s

Lake Okabena is a small lake located in Nobles County in southwestern Minnesota. It was first noted on a map made by French explorer Joseph Nicollet in 1841, based upon his explorations of the 1830s. The name okabena means "home of the heron" in the Sioux language. Lake Okabena is located entirely within the present-day city limits of Worthington, Minnesota.

== History ==
Though Nicollet's map shows only one Lake Okabena, the earliest survey map of the area made in 1868 shows two lakes - East Okabena (no longer in existence) and West Okabena.

=== Effect of the railways ===
When the St Paul & Sioux City Railroad (now the Union Pacific) was built through the region in 1871, tracks were laid between the two lakes. A station house was built along the southeastern shore of West Lake Okabena and was named the Okabena Railroad Station. Steam engines of the day consumed enormous quantities of water, and water stops were required every 8 to 12 miles along any route. The Okabena Railway Station was one of these, drawing water directly out of West Okabena.

In 1872, a large influx of settlers arrived in the region and a town was built. The town and the railroad station were christened Worthington, after the mother-in-law of A. P. Miller, one of the town's founding fathers, and it was located between West Okabena and East Okabena.

Draining of East Okabena, in 1899 or 1900

Article from The Worthington Advance, December 8, 1899

When the Burlington Railroad (later the Rock Island Railroad) built a line connecting Round Lake, Worthington, and Wilmont in 1889-1890, it was built across the dried lake bed of East Okabena. It is thought that the lake had been drained to make way for this railroad. The lake was thoroughly described in an 1882 geology report on the state of Minnesota and is clearly visible on an 1884 county map, yet by the time the Burlington Railroad was built, the lake was gone. A 1914 plat map of Worthington refers to an area as "formerly East Okabena lake", "Now dry, having been drained". An 1899 Worthington Advance newspaper article details who was given the job of draining the lake (see photo), but no one knows who ordered the deed to be done. One photograph exists of men digging the trench which drained the waters of East Okabena away forever.

A second ditch with the curious name of Whiskey Ditch drains water into Lake Okabena. During the late 1800s there was a drought, and the level of Lake Okabena was very low. People saw spring runoff and precious summer rain running north to Heron Lake through Okabena Creek, and they wanted this runoff to instead flow into Lake Okabena. The project consisted of many men digging through a large hill where present County Hwy 35 crosses the present ditch. The odd name for this ditch was given because of the way it was financed. The funding for project was provided by a "whiskey tax" charged within the town of Worthington.

The Burlington/Rock Island Railroad greatly changed the complexion and character of the eastern shore of the remaining Lake Okabena. Once a gently sloping shoreline with beach, boathouses, and picnic pavilions, the region came to resemble an industrial area. A large coal powered electrical generation plant was built. This plant hummed night and day, vibrating the ground of the surrounding neighborhood as it generated electrical power and steam heat for the city of Worthington.

=== Modern times ===
The Rock Island Railroad ceased operating in the region in the 1980s and its rail lines were torn up. The power plant also ceased operating and was demolished in the 1990s. The region has since been reclaimed as a city park named Sailboard Beach. It is presently the site of a yearly sailboard racing competition and music festival.
