= Dewald Township, Nobles County, Minnesota =

Dewald Township, Minnesota
- Township
- Location within the state of Minnesota Dewald Township, Minnesota (the United States)
- Coordinates: 43°37′33″N 95°45′51″W
- Country: United States
- State: Minnesota
- County: Nobles

Area
  - Total: 36.0 sq mi (93.3 km^{2})
  - Land: 36.0 sq mi (93.3 km^{2})
  - Water: 0 sq mi (0.0 km^{2})
- Elevation: 1,644 ft (501 m)

Population (2000)
  - Total: 291
  - Density: 8.0/sq mi (3.1/km^{2})
- Time zone: UTC-6 (Central (CST))
  - Summer (DST): UTC-5 (CDT)
- FIPS code: 27-15850
- GNIS feature ID: 0663974

Dewald Township is a township in Nobles County, Minnesota, United States. The population was 291 at the 2000 census.

== Geography ==
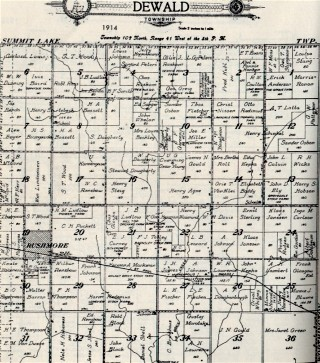
Map of Dewald Township - 1914

According to the United States Census Bureau, the township has a total area of 36.0 square miles (93 km^{2}), all land. The Buffalo Ridge, the drainage divide between the Mississippi and Missouri Rivers systems, extends through Dewald Township. The Little Rock Creek and the Kanaranzi Creek both flow through the township.

Main highways include:

- Interstate 90
- Nobles County Road 9
- Nobles County Road 12
- Nobles County Road 35

== History ==
Dewald Township was organized in 1872, and named for Amos and Hiram Dewald, early settlers.

== Demographics ==
As of the census of 2000, there were 291 people, 103 households, and 86 families residing in the township. The population density was 8.1 inhabitants per square mile (3.1/km^{2}). There were 109 housing units at an average density of 3.0 per square mile (1.2/km^{2}). The racial makeup of the township was 98.97% White, 0.69% Asian, 0.34% from other races. Hispanic or Latino of any race were 1.37% of the population.

There were 103 households, out of which 38.8% had children under the age of 18 living with them, 77.7% were married couples living together, 1.0% had a female householder with no husband present, and 16.5% were non-families. 15.5% of all households were made up of individuals, and 5.8% had someone living alone who was 65 years of age or older. The average household size was 2.83 and the average family size was 3.17.

In the township the population was spread out, with 28.9% under the age of 18, 5.2% from 18 to 24, 26.8% from 25 to 44, 25.8% from 45 to 64, and 13.4% who were 65 years of age or older. The median age was 40 years. For every 100 females, there were 112.4 males. For every 100 females age 18 and over, there were 120.2 males.

The median income for a household in the township was $40,625, and the median income for a family was $41,875. Males had a median income of $30,313 versus $24,375 for females. The per capita income for the township was $18,814. About 7.6% of families and 10.1% of the population were below the poverty line, including 10.9% of those under the age of eighteen and 20.0% of those 65 or over.

== Politics ==
Dewald Township is located in Minnesota's 1st congressional district, represented by Mankato educator Tim Walz, a Democrat. At the state level, Dewald Township is located in Senate District 22, represented by Republican Doug Magnus, and in House District 22A, represented by Republican Joe Schomacker.

== Local politics ==
Dewald Township is represented by Nobles County Commissioner Matt Widboom.
