= Org, Minnesota =

Org
- Unincorporated community
- Interactive map of Org
- Coordinates: 43°34′53″N 95°39′06″W
- Country: United States
- State: Minnesota
- County: Nobles
- Elevation: 1,660 ft (510 m)
- Time zone: UTC-6 (Central (CST))
  - Summer (DST): UTC-5 (CDT)
- ZIP code: 56187
- Area code: 507
- GNIS feature ID: 649856

Org is an unincorporated community in Nobles County, Minnesota, United States.

== History ==
Theodore Roosevelt speaking in Org

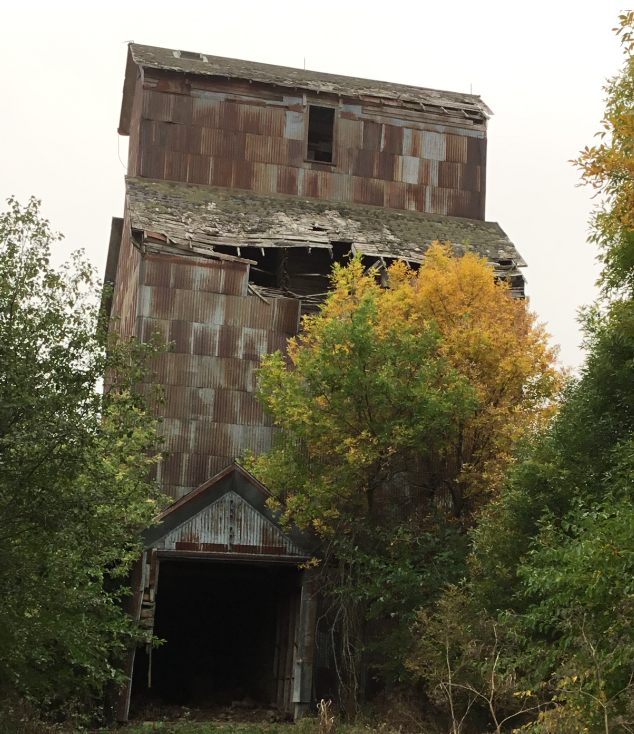
Grain elevator seen behind Roosevelt train, 2020

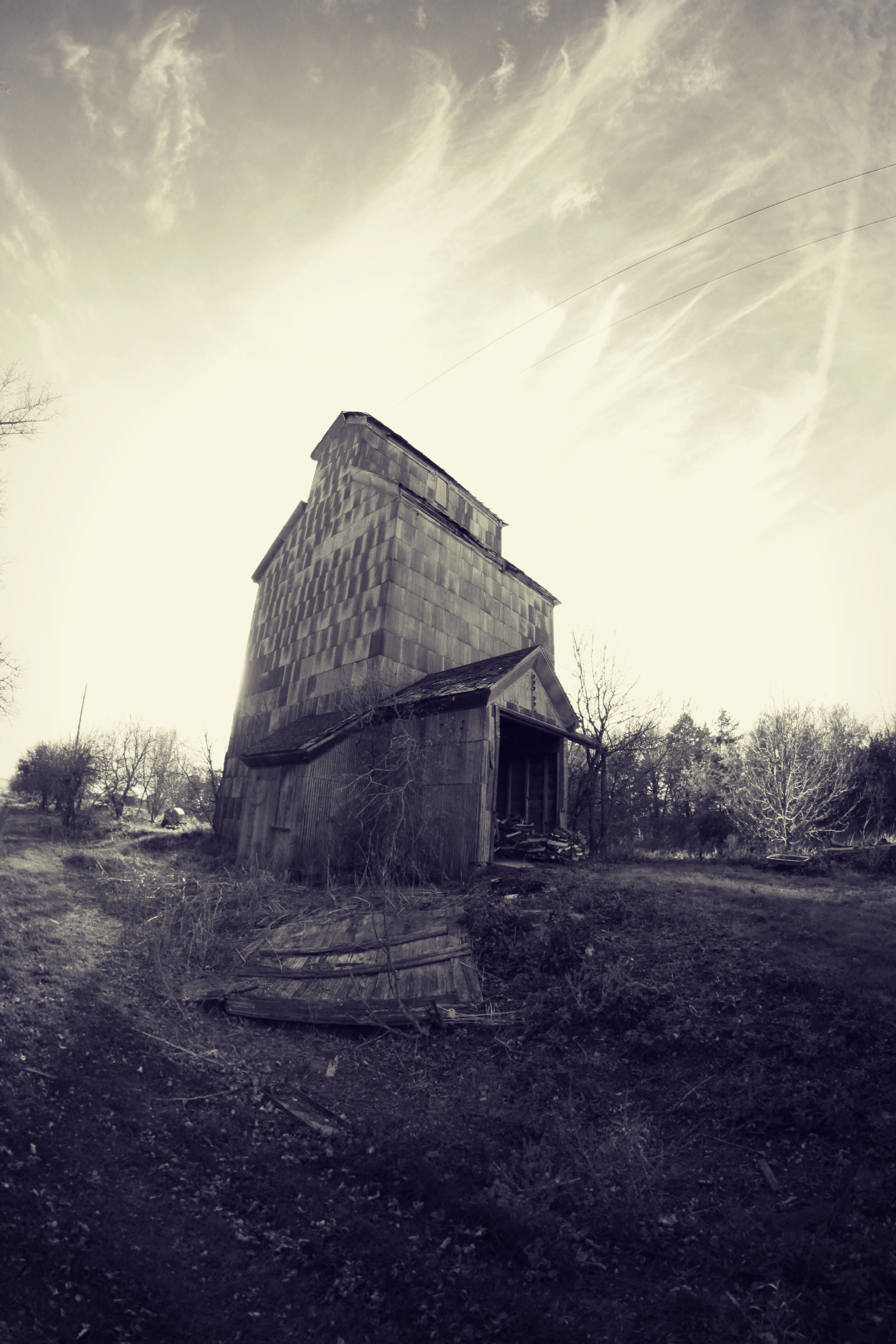
Grain elevator, 2010

=== Origin of name ===
Org was originally called Islen, after Adrian C. Iselin, one of the directors of the St. Paul and Sioux City Railroad Company. The year was 1872, and no town existed. Iselin consisted of a section house and a water-stop. Steam locomotives consumed enormous quantities of water, and water-stops were established every 8 to 12 miles along any rail route. Iselin was one of these. When the St. Paul and Sioux City Railroad Company built a spur line from Iselin to Sioux Falls in 1876, the name of the site was changed to Sioux Falls Junction. In 1890 the name was changed to Org by W.A. Scott, a general manager of the Chicago & Northwestern Railway, the company that absorbed the St. Paul and Sioux City Railroad Company. He considered the railroad junction an ideal location for a town. The significance of the name "Org" remains obscure; it may be derived from "dog". The town was platted in 1899, and a railroad station was built on the Chicago & Northwestern Railway's main St Paul to Sioux City line. Even though Org never became incorporated, a post office was established between 1895-1917.

=== Distinguished visitors ===
Two American presidents briefly visited Org. Theodore Roosevelt traveled through Org when he was running for president in 1912 as the Bull Moose Party candidate. Woodrow Wilson passed through in 1919 on his nationwide tour to sell the Treaty of Versailles to the nation. Roosevelt actually stopped in Org and spoke from the back of his train. Wilson's train merely slowed enough to switch from the main Chicago & Northwestern track to the Sioux Falls spur line.

=== Org's heyday ===
For many years, the town had but one street—the old wagon road that connected Worthington, Minnesota with Sibley, Iowa. When a paved highway was built in 1931 (U.S. Route 59 / Minnesota State Highway 60), it paralleled the wagon road about 50 yards to the southeast. A one-block long road was constructed connecting the two existing roads, and this third roadway became Org's main business district, at one time boasting several businesses. In its heyday, the town had a post office, a railroad station, a grain elevator, a general store, a lumber company, a coal company, and a filling station.

=== Org's decline ===
The Sioux Falls spur line of the Chicago & Northwestern Railway was never widely used, and by the 1950s, the line was all but abandoned. Org's decline soon followed. The grain elevator and railroad station closed. The general store and the filling station followed. By the 1970s, the town consisted of just a few family homes, an abandoned grain elevator, and several dilapidated buildings.

=== Org today ===
The last person who claimed to be Mayor of Org, Mark Marcotte, left the town circa 1980, though there is no evidence that Mr. Marcott was actually elected to that post. In 2000, Org's original roadway was downgraded to a "minimum maintenance roadway", and by 2010, many of the remaining homes were bought up by the State of Minnesota to make way for the upgrading of Minnesota State Highway 60 from two lanes to four lanes. The former Chicago & Northwestern Railroad line is now operated by Union Pacific, and is busier than ever. But as for Org, nearly every trace of the town is gone.

== Geography ==
Org is located approximately four miles southwest of Worthington on Minnesota State Highway 60 and U.S. Route 59. It lies directly adjacent to the Union Pacific Railroad's Minneapolis-to-Omaha Line.

Main highways include:

- U.S. Highway 59
- Minnesota State Highway 60

== Government ==
Org is located in Bigelow Township which is located in Minnesota's 1st congressional district, represented by Brad Finstad, a Republican. At the state level, Org is located in Senate District 21, represented by Republican Bill Weber, and in House District 21B, represented by Republican Marj Fogelman.

Org is in Bigelow Township and is represented by Nobles County Commissioner Matt Widboom.
