= Olney Township, Nobles County, Minnesota =

Olney Township, Minnesota
- Township
- Location within the state of Minnesota Olney Township, Minnesota (the United States)
- Coordinates: 43°37′57″N 95°51′40″W
- Country: United States
- State: Minnesota
- County: Nobles

Area
  - Total: 35.4 sq mi (91.8 km^{2})
  - Land: 35.4 sq mi (91.7 km^{2})
  - Water: 0.039 sq mi (0.1 km^{2})
- Elevation: 1,594 ft (486 m)

Population (2000)
  - Total: 232
  - Density: 6.5/sq mi (2.5/km^{2})
- Time zone: UTC-6 (Central (CST))
  - Summer (DST): UTC-5 (CDT)
- FIPS code: 27-48274
- GNIS feature ID: 0665207

Olney Township is a township in Nobles County, Minnesota, United States. The population was 232 at the 2000 census.

== Geography ==
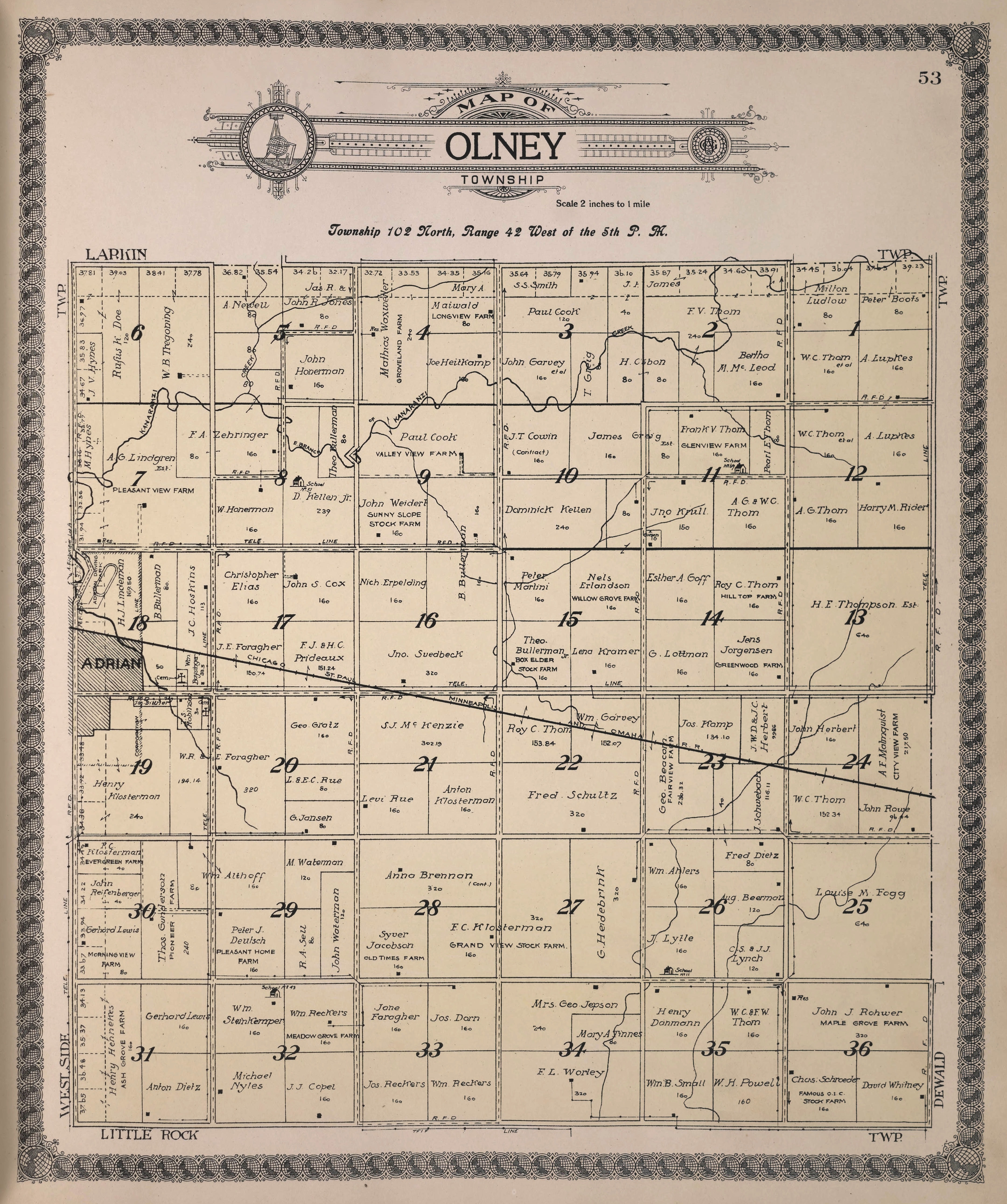
Map of Olney Township, MN, 1914

According to the United States Census Bureau, the township has a total area of 35.5 square miles (91.8 km^{2}), of which 35.4 square miles (91.7 km^{2}) is land and 0.04 square mile (0.1 km^{2}) (0.08%) is water. The main geographic feature of Olney Township is the east branch of the Kanaranzi Creek, which extends through the northern sections of the township.

Main highways include:

- Interstate 90
- Minnesota State Highway 91
- Nobles County Road 35

== History ==
Organization of Olney Township was approved by the Nobles County Board on July 10, 1873. The original name selected was Hebbard Township in honor of pioneer settler William F Hebbard. However, no township meeting was called until October 14, 1873, and shortly before this meeting occurred, the Nobles County Board changed the name to New Haven Township. Shortly thereafter, the county was informed by the state auditor's office that another New Haven Township existed elsewhere in the state. Finally, on June 15, 1874, the board accepted the suggestion of pioneer settler R. W. Moberly that the township be named after Olney, Illinois, county seat of Richland County, Illinois.

== Demographics ==
As of the census of 2000, there were 232 people, 74 households, and 66 families residing in the township. The population density was 6.5 people per square mile (2.5/km^{2}). There were 77 housing units at an average density of 2.2/sq mi (0.8/km^{2}). The racial makeup of the township was 99.14% White, and 0.86% from two or more races.

There were 74 households, out of which 45.9% had children under the age of 18 living with them, 82.4% were married couples living together, 4.1% had a female householder with no husband present, and 10.8% were non-families. 8.1% of all households were made up of individuals, and 2.7% had someone living alone who was 65 years of age or older. The average household size was 3.14 and the average family size was 3.36.

In the township the population was spread out, with 35.3% under the age of 18, 3.0% from 18 to 24, 29.3% from 25 to 44, 20.3% from 45 to 64, and 12.1% who were 65 years of age or older. The median age was 33 years. For every 100 females, there were 114.8 males. For every 100 females age 18 and over, there were 123.9 males.

The median income for a household in the township was $34,375, and the median income for a family was $35,313. Males had a median income of $23,750 versus $21,250 for females. The per capita income for the township was $12,378. About 2.9% of families and 1.8% of the population were below the poverty line, including none of those under the age of eighteen or sixty five or over.

== Politics ==
Olney Township is located in Minnesota's 1st congressional district, represented by Mankato educator Tim Walz, a Democrat. At the state level, Olney Township is located in Senate District 22, represented by Republican Doug Magnus, and in House District 22A, represented by Republican Joe Schomacker.

== Local politics ==
Olney Towshnip is represented by Nobles County Commissioner Gene Metz
