= Lismore Township, Nobles County, Minnesota =

Lismore Township, Minnesota
- Township
- Location within the state of Minnesota Lismore Township, Minnesota (the United States)
- Coordinates: 43°43′32″N 96°0′5″W
- Country: United States
- State: Minnesota
- County: Nobles

Area
  - Total: 35.8 sq mi (92.7 km^{2})
  - Land: 35.8 sq mi (92.7 km^{2})
  - Water: 0 sq mi (0.0 km^{2})
- Elevation: 1,611 ft (491 m)

Population (2000)
  - Total: 232
  - Density: 6.5/sq mi (2.5/km^{2})
- Time zone: UTC-6 (Central (CST))
  - Summer (DST): UTC-5 (CDT)
- ZIP code: 56155
- Area code: 507
- FIPS code: 27-37430
- GNIS feature ID: 0664796

Lismore Township is a township in Nobles County, Minnesota, United States. The population was 232 at the 2000 census.

== Geography ==
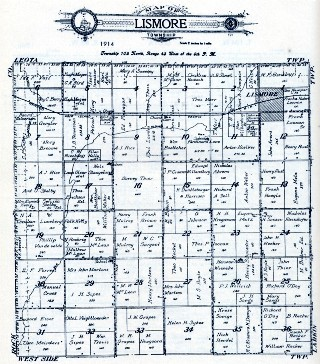
Map of Lismore Township - 1914

According to the United States Census Bureau, the township has a total area of 35.8 square miles (92.7 km^{2}), all land. The main geographic feature of Lismore Township is the Elk Creek, which flows westward and eventually joins the Big Sioux River system. (A separate and distinct Elk Creek exists elsewhere in Nobles County and flows eastward, joining the Des Moines River system.)

Main highways include:

- Minnesota State Highway 91
- Nobles County Road 14
- Nobles County Road 16
- Nobles County Road 19

== History ==
Farmstead and family of Mr. Robert Sell, one of the original pioneers of Lismore Township

Father C. J. Knauf played an important role in the settlement of Lismore Township

Organization of Lismore Township was approved by the Nobles County Board on July 21, 1880. The first town meeting was held on August 9, 1880. Bishop John Ireland's Catholic Colonization program brought more than 4,000 people from slums and impoverished areas of Ireland to southwestern Minnesota. Many of them settled in and around Adrian. In honor of the Irish settlers, Father C. J. Knauf, the parish priest in Adrian and Bishop Ireland's colonization agent in Nobles County, suggested the name Lismore, after a village in County Waterford, Ireland, noted for its beautiful castle. The town of Lismore, Minnesota, was incorporated in 1902 and named after the township

== Demographics ==
As of the census of 2000, there were 232 people, 76 households, and 63 families residing in the township. The population density was 6.5 inhabitants per square mile (2.5/km^{2}). There were 83 housing units at an average density of 2.3 per square mile (0.89/km^{2}). The racial makeup of the township was 97.41% White, 0.43% from other races, and 2.16% from two or more races. Hispanic or Latino of any race were 1.29% of the population.

There were 76 households, out of which 47.4% had children under the age of 18 living with them, 77.6% were married couples living together, 3.9% had a female householder with no husband present, and 17.1% were non-families. 15.8% of all households were made up of individuals, and 9.2% had someone living alone who was 65 years of age or older. The average household size was 3.05 and the average family size was 3.44.

In the township the population was spread out, with 36.6% under the age of 18, 3.4% from 18 to 24, 28.0% from 25 to 44, 16.8% from 45 to 64, and 15.1% who were 65 years of age or older. The median age was 34 years. For every 100 females, there were 90.2 males. For every 100 females age 18 and over, there were 104.2 males.

The median income for a household in the township was $33,125, and the median income for a family was $33,750. Males had a median income of $17,500 versus $18,750 for females. The per capita income for the township was $11,805. About 21.3% of families and 24.3% of the population were below the poverty line, including 35.5% of those under the age of eighteen and 16.2% of those 65 or over.

== Politics ==
Lismore Township is located in Minnesota's 1st congressional district, represented by Mankato educator Tim Walz, a Democrat. At the state level, Lismore Township is located in Senate District 22, represented by Democrat Jim Vickerman, and in House District 22A, represented by Republican Doug Magnus.

== Local politics ==
Lismore Township is represented by Nobles County Commissioner Gene Metz
