= Danville Township, Blue Earth County, Minnesota =

Township in Minnesota, United States

Danville Township
- Township
- Location within the state of Minnesota Danville Township (the United States)
- Coordinates: 43°53′40″N 93°50′35″W
- Country: United States
- State: Minnesota
- County: Blue Earth

Area
  - Total: 36.1 sq mi (93.5 km^{2})
  - Land: 35.8 sq mi (92.8 km^{2})
  - Water: 0.27 sq mi (0.7 km^{2})
- Elevation: 1,024 ft (312 m)

Population (2000)
  - Total: 262
  - Density: 7.3/sq mi (2.8/km^{2})
- Time zone: UTC-6 (Central (CST))
  - Summer (DST): UTC-5 (CDT)
- FIPS code: 27-14752
- GNIS feature ID: 0663924

Danville Township is a township in Blue Earth County, Minnesota, United States. The population was 262 as of the 2000 census.

== History ==
Danville Township was established in 1858, and named after Danville, Vermont, the former hometown of an early settler.

== Geography ==
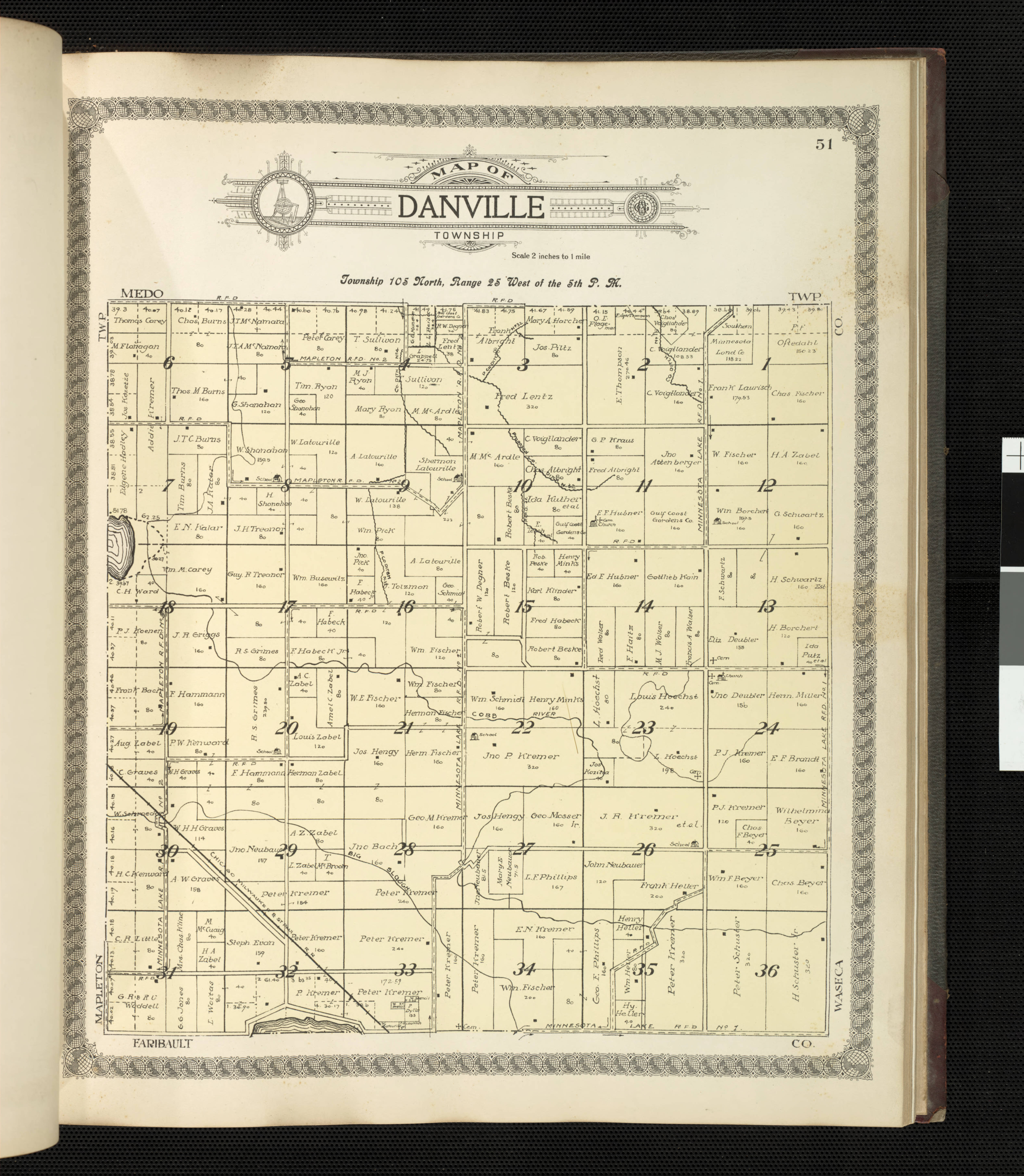
Danville Township Plat Map from the Standard Atlas, Blue Earth County, Minnesota

According to the United States Census Bureau, the township has a total area of 36.1 square miles (93 km^{2}), of which 35.8 square miles (93 km^{2}) is land and 0.3 square miles (0.78 km^{2}) (0.72%) is water.

The city of Minnesota Lake is entirely within the township geographically but is a separate entity.

=== Major highways ===
- Minnesota State Highway 22
- Minnesota State Highway 30

=== Lakes ===
- Knights Lake (east half)
- Kremer Lake
- Minnesota Lake

=== Adjacent townships ===
- Medo Township (north)
- Freedom Township, Waseca County (northeast)
- Vivian Township, Waseca County (east)
- Dunbar Township, Faribault County (southeast)
- Minnesota Lake Township, Faribault County (south)
- Lura Township, Faribault County (southwest)
- Mapleton Township (west)
- Beauford Township (northwest)

=== Cemeteries ===
The township includes the following cemeteries: Catholic, Danville, Oak Grove, Peace, Saint John and Saint John's.

== Demographics ==
As of the census of 2000, there were 262 people, 95 households, and 77 families residing in the township. The population density was 7.3 people per square mile (2.8/km^{2}). There were 102 housing units at an average density of 2.8/sq mi (1.1/km^{2}). The racial makeup of the township was 98.85% White, 0.38% from other races, and 0.76% from two or more races. Hispanic or Latino of any race were 0.38% of the population.

There were 95 households, out of which 33.7% had children under the age of 18 living with them, 73.7% were married couples living together, 4.2% had a female householder with no husband present, and 18.9% were non-families. 17.9% of all households were made up of individuals, and 8.4% had someone living alone who was 65 years of age or older. The average household size was 2.76 and the average family size was 3.12.

In the township the population was spread out, with 24.4% under the age of 18, 7.6% from 18 to 24, 22.9% from 25 to 44, 31.7% from 45 to 64, and 13.4% who were 65 years of age or older. The median age was 43 years. For every 100 females, there were 113.0 males. For every 100 females age 18 and over, there were 122.5 males.

The median income for a household in the township was $41,250, and the median income for a family was $47,083. Males had a median income of $28,750 versus $18,542 for females. The per capita income for the township was $21,527. About 9.6% of families and 12.3% of the population were below the poverty line, including 19.7% of those under the age of eighteen and none of those 65 or over.
