= Minnesota State Highway 253 =

State highway in Minnesota, United States

Trunk Highway 253
- MN 253 highlighted in red

Route information
- Maintained by MnDOT
- Length: 6.472 mi (10.416 km)
- Existed: July 1, 1949–October 1, 2019

Major junctions
- South end: CSAH 2 at Bricelyn
- North end: I-90 at Brush Creek Township

Location
- Country: United States
- State: Minnesota
- Counties: Faribault

Highway system
- Minnesota Trunk Highway System; Interstate; US; State; Legislative; Scenic
← MN 252	→ MN 254

Minnesota State Highway 253 (MN 253) was a 6.472-mile-long (10.416 km) highway in south-central Minnesota, which ran from its intersection with Faribault County State-Aid Highway 2 in the city of Bricelyn and continued north to its northern terminus at its interchange with Interstate 90 in Brush Creek Township.

In 2019, the route was marked as Faribault County State-Aid Highway 23.

== Route description ==
Highway 253 served as a short north–south connector route in south-central Minnesota between the city of Bricelyn and Interstate 90.

At its northern terminus interchange with I-90, Highway 253 was located on the edge of the Walnut Lake Wildlife Management Area.

The route was legally defined as Route 253 in the Minnesota Statutes.

== History ==
Highway 253 was authorized on July 1, 1949.

The route was paved at the time it was marked.

On October 1, 2019, the state transferred ownership to Faribault County and the road is no longer part of the state highway system.

== Major intersections ==
The entire route is in Faribault County.

Location	mi	km	Destinations	Notes
Bricelyn	0.000	0.000	CSAH 2	
Brush Creek Township	6.011	9.674	CSAH 16	Former U.S. 16
Brush Creek Township	6.314– 6.472	10.161– 10.416	I-90 – Blue Earth, Albert Lea	Interchange
1.000 mi = 1.609 km; 1.000 km = 0.621 mi
