= Minnesota State Highway 109 =

State highway in Minnesota, United States

Trunk Highway 109
- MN 109 highlighted in red

Route information
- Maintained by MnDOT
- Length: 32.833 mi (52.840 km)
- Existed: April 22, 1933–present

Major junctions
- West end: US 169 at Winnebago
- MN 22 at Wells
- East end: I-90 / CSAH 6 at Alden

Location
- Country: United States
- State: Minnesota
- Counties: Faribault, Freeborn

Highway system
- Minnesota Trunk Highway System; Interstate; US; State; Legislative; Scenic
← MN 108	→ MN 110

Minnesota State Highway 109 (MN 109) is a 32.833-mile-long (52.840 km) highway in south-central Minnesota, which runs from its intersection with U.S. Highway 169 in Winnebago and continues east to its eastern terminus at its interchange with Interstate 90 in Alden.

Highway 109 passes through the cities of Winnebago, Wells, and Alden.

== Route description ==
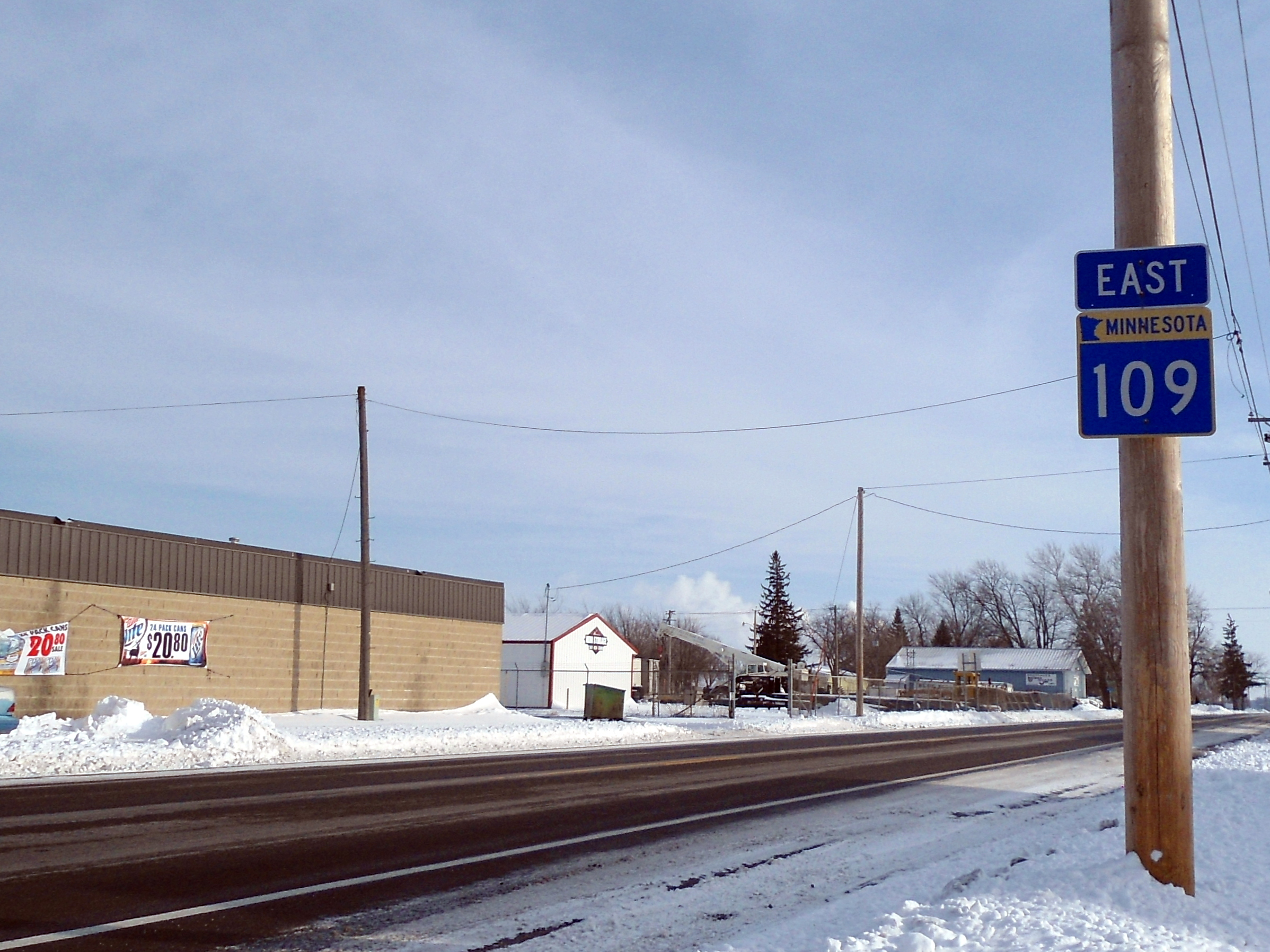
MN 109 in Winnebago

Highway 109 serves as an east–west route in south-central Minnesota between Winnebago, Delavan, Easton, Wells, and Alden.

Highway 109 runs concurrent with State Highway 22 on 2nd Avenue NW in the city of Wells for two blocks.

The route is also known as South Broadway in Alden.

Highway 109, together with State Highway 22 and I-90, are used by motorists as a direct route between Albert Lea and Mankato.

Highway 109 mostly parallels I-90 and State Highway 30 throughout its route. 109 intersects I-90 at its eastern terminus in Alden.

== History ==
Highway 109 was authorized in 1933 between Alden and Wells. The route was expanded west of Wells to Winnebago in 1949.

The entire route was paved by 1953, including the expanded section between Wells and Winnebago.

== Major intersections ==
County	Location	mi	km	Destinations	Notes
Faribault	Winnebago	0.000	0.000	US 169	Western terminus
Faribault	Delavan	7.927	12.757	CR 13	
Faribault	Lura Township	10.926	17.584	CR 17 north	
Faribault	Barber Township	11.932	19.203	CR 17 south	
Faribault	Walnut Lake Township	16.034	25.804	CR 21 north	
Faribault	Walnut Lake Township	17.611	28.342	CR 21 south	
Faribault	Wells	22.590	36.355	MN 22	South end of MN 22 overlap
Faribault	Wells	22.764	36.635	MN 22 northwest, CR 29 north	North end of MN 22 overlap
Faribault	Wells	23.279	37.464	CR 32 (1st Street NE)	
Freeborn	Carlston Township	31.670	50.968	CR 6 north	
Freeborn	Alden	32.808	52.799	I-90, CR 6 south	Eastern terminus; I-90 exit 146; diamond interchange
1.000 mi = 1.609 km; 1.000 km = 0.621 mi: Concurrency terminus
