= National Register of Historic Places listings in Faribault County, Minnesota =

Location of Faribault County in Minnesota

There are 13 properties and districts listed on the National Register of Historic Places in Faribault County, Minnesota, United States, plus one additional site that was formerly listed on the National Register.

This National Park Service list is complete through NPS recent listings posted May 1, 2026.

== Current listings ==
	Name on the Register	Image	Date listed	Location	City or town	Description
1	Adams H. Bullis House	Adams H. Bullis House	May 23, 1980 (#80004259)	Address restricted 43°45′39″N 94°06′57″W	Delavan	Circa-1875 Italianate farmhouse of scientific cattle breeder Adams H. Bullis (1832–?), a leading figure representative of Faribault County's agricultural history and its transition from pioneer farms to sophisticated enterprises.
2	Center Creek Archeological District	Center Creek Archeological District	September 15, 1976 (#76001052)	Both sides of Center Creek above its confluence with the Blue Earth River; 43°44′16″N 94°11′00″W	Winnebago	Dense cluster of sites associated with the Blue Earth Phase of the Oneota culture, one of Minnesota's earliest farming societies. The sites are characterized by abundant storage pits and ground stone tools.
3	Chicago, Milwaukee, St. Paul and Pacific Depot and Lunchroom	Chicago, Milwaukee, St. Paul and Pacific Depot and Lunchroom	May 23, 1980 (#80004263)	89–100 1st St., NW. 43°44′46″N 93°43′37″W	Wells	Two 1903 buildings representative of the substantial railroad activity in Wells—a train station and a freestanding lunchroom that served crew and passengers.
4	Church of the Good Shepherd-Episcopal	Church of the Good Shepherd-Episcopal	May 23, 1980 (#80004257)	221 S. Moore St. 43°38′12″N 94°06′02″W	Blue Earth	1872 example of the small Gothic Revival churches built under the leadership of Episcopal bishop Henry Benjamin Whipple.
5	District No. 40 School	District No. 40 School	May 23, 1980 (#80004264)	Minnesota Highway 109; 43°44′45″N 93°49′38″W	Wells	One of Faribault County's best-preserved rural schoolhouses, in operation 1896–1952. Known as the Pink Schoolhouse for its distinctive color scheme.
6	Andrew C. Dunn House	Andrew C. Dunn House	May 23, 1980 (#80004265)	133 S. Main St. 43°45′57″N 94°09′59″W	Winnebago	Prominent house built in 1901 for Andrew C. Dunn, who helped found Winnebago in 1857 and served a leading role in civic and political life.
7	Faribault County Courthouse	Faribault County Courthouse	April 11, 1977 (#77000731)	415 N. Main; 43°38′33″N 94°06′11″W	Blue Earth	Courthouse built 1891–92, exemplifying the late-19th century's Richardsonian Romanesque public buildings.
8	First National Bank	First National Bank	May 23, 1980 (#80004266)	1 Main St. S. 43°46′04″N 94°09′58″W	Winnebago	Leading example—constructed from 1916 to '17—of the Neoclassical bank buildings that often characterized Minnesota's early-20th-century smalltown streetscapes.
9	Peter Kremer House	Peter Kremer House	May 23, 1980 (#80004260)	317 Main St. 43°50′34″N 93°49′58″W	Minnesota Lake	Prominent house built in 1906 for Minnesota Lake's leading entrepreneur and town promoter. Now a museum.
10	Muret N. Leland House	Muret N. Leland House	May 23, 1980 (#80004261)	410 2nd Ave., SW. 43°44′26″N 93°43′44″W	Wells	One of Wells' most prominent houses, built in 1883 and later owned by pioneer merchant and politician Muret N. Leland (1849–1921).
11	Memorial Library	Memorial Library	December 20, 1988 (#88002835)	405 E. 6th St. 43°38′18″N 94°05′54″W	Blue Earth	Public library built in 1904 as the Etta C. Ross Memorial Library, noted as a project of a local philanthropist in memory of his late wife and for its Neoclassical architecture. Now a museum.
12	James B. Wakefield House	James B. Wakefield House	May 23, 1980 (#80004258)	405 E. 6th St. 43°38′20″N 94°05′52″W	Blue Earth	1868 house of James Wakefield (1825–1910), one of the principal founders of Blue Earth and Faribault County, and a career politician who served as lieutenant governor and a U.S. congressman. Now a museum.
13	Walters Jail	Walters Jail	May 23, 1980 (#80004262)	115 E. 3rd St. 43°36′20″N 93°40′20″W	Walters	1906 freestanding jail reflecting the insular nature of small railroad towns in their initial years.

== Former listing ==
	Name on the Register	Image	Date listed	Date removed	Location	City or town	Description
1	Constans Hotel	Constans Hotel	May 23, 1980 (#80004256)	May 7, 1990	121-127 N. Main St.	Blue Earth	Elegant hotel established in 1868 and heavily remodeled in 1896. Fell into disrepair and was demolished by the city in 1988.

== See also ==
- List of National Historic Landmarks in Minnesota
- National Register of Historic Places listings in Minnesota
