= Mapleton Township, Blue Earth County, Minnesota =

Township in Minnesota, United States

Mapleton Township
- Township
- Location within the state of Minnesota Mapleton Township (the United States)
- Coordinates: 43°53′30″N 93°57′14″W
- Country: United States
- State: Minnesota
- County: Blue Earth

Area
  - Total: 34.4 sq mi (89.1 km^{2})
  - Land: 34.1 sq mi (88.4 km^{2})
  - Water: 0.27 sq mi (0.7 km^{2})
- Elevation: 1,024 ft (312 m)

Population (2000)
  - Total: 310
  - Density: 9.1/sq mi (3.5/km^{2})
- Time zone: UTC-6 (Central (CST))
  - Summer (DST): UTC-5 (CDT)
- ZIP code: 56065
- Area code: 507
- FIPS code: 27-40328
- GNIS feature ID: 0664908

Mapleton Township is a township in Blue Earth County, Minnesota, United States. The population was 310 as of the 2000 census.

== History ==
Mapleton Township was organized in 1861, and named from the Maple River.

Mapleton Township was first settled in 1856 and was first known as Sherman Township, named for Isaac sherman, one of the original settlers. The area included the present townships of Sterling, Mapleton, and Danville. School District No. 5 was organized on the same date and covered the same territory. Two years later, in April 1858, present-day Sterling Township was organized under the name of Mapleton but was renamed "Sterling Township" in 1859. With the separation of the two towns, the present names were adopted. The first town meetings of the independent municipalities were held in April 1861.

=== The Mapleton Colony ===
In the winter of 1854-55 A. Murphy, a New York City school teacher, ran a newspaper ad for a meeting to form a colony to locate in the territory of Minnesota to establish their homes. Through advertising the colony drew membership from the northeastern states, the majority from New York; almost all had English or Scottish surnames.

The group that came out of this was called The Minnesota Settlement Association, with A. Murphy as the president. Robert Taylor was authorized to go to southern Minnesota to select the best location for the settlement. Taylor came to Blue Earth County in the winter of 1855-56 and was helped by L.G.M. Fletcher, who had originally helped survey lands around Sterling and Mapleton Townships. The only settlers in this area at this time were V.A. Highland and his two brothers-in-law, Barnabas W. Simmons and Horace M. DeWolf.

Settlement members bought shares for $10 each which entitled them to cheap transportation west, an opportunity to claim 160 acres of farmland, and one lot in a town site to be platted in the center of the settlement.

Most of the colony left from New York City in April 1856. They had made an agreement with a railroad company to carry them to Dunleith, Illinois, then the nearest point to Minnesota to be reached by railroad, across the Mississippi River from Dubuque, Iowa.

Some of the colonies, especially from Illinois, Indiana and Iowa, made the trip overland across Iowa, to Minnesota, with the wagon and stock. The majority made the journey by steamboat, up the Mississippi River then down the Minnesota River to Mankato. There were 350 adults and 90 children in the party. After a few days thé colonists started for the land that Mr. Taylor had secured by foot and ox cart. They arrived in the spring of 1856. There were 30 tents, 12 feet x 25 feet, to shelter the entire company until houses could be built.

The land blocked out into claims of 160 acres each, but only 65 claims had the desired amount of timber. Three of the head officers were allowed to pick first. The rest of the claims were numbered and divided into lots for the 139 people entitled to a claim.

With more than half the tickets blank it resulted in great dissatisfaction with widespread fighting that followed and a great deal of claim jumping. Most of the disappointed scattered; some went to the timber country near Mankato, others crossed into Faribault County, and a large number returned east very disgruntaled.

== Geography ==
According to the United States Census Bureau, the township has a total area of 34.4 square miles (89.0 km^{2}), of which 34.1 square miles (88.4 km^{2}) is land and 0.3 square miles (0.7 km^{2}) (0.76%) is water.

The city of Mapleton is within the township geographically but is a separate entity.

=== Major highways ===
- Minnesota State Highway 22
- Minnesota State Highway 30

=== Lakes ===
- Knights Lake (east half)
- Lura Lake (west edge)

=== Adjacent townships ===
- Beauford Township (north)
- Medo Township (northeast)
- Danville Township (east)
- Lura Township, Faribault County (south)
- Delavan Township, Faribault County (southwest)
- Sterling Township (west)
- Lyra Township (northwest)

=== Cemeteries ===
The township includes the following cemeteries: Calvary, Chase and Union.

== Demographics ==
As of the census of 2000, there were 310 people, 112 households, and 90 families residing in the township. The population density was 9.1 people per square mile (3.5/km^{2}). There were 117 housing units at an average density of 3.4/sq mi (1.3/km^{2}). The racial makeup of the township was 97.74% White, 0.32% African American, 0.32% Native American, 0.65% Asian, 0.97% from other races. Hispanic or Latino of any race were 0.97% of the population.

There were 112 households, out of which 31.3% had children under the age of 18 living with them, 73.2% were married couples living together, 3.6% had a female householder with no husband present, and 19.6% were non-families. 15.2% of all households were made up of individuals, and 6.3% had someone living alone who was 65 years of age or older. The average household size was 2.77 and the average family size was 3.06.

In the township the population was spread out, with 24.5% under the age of 18, 6.5% from 18 to 24, 25.2% from 25 to 44, 27.7% from 45 to 64, and 16.1% who were 65 years of age or older. The median age was 41 years. For every 100 females, there were 116.8 males. For every 100 females age 18 and over, there were 118.7 males.

The median income for a household in the township was $50,000, and the median income for a family was $60,114. Males had a median income of $37,250 versus $26,500 for females. The per capita income for the township was $22,557. About 5.3% of families and 9.7% of the population were below the poverty line, including 24.6% of those under age 18 and none of those age 65 or over.
