= Clayton, Minnesota =

Ghost town in Minnesota, United States

Coordinates: 43°34′50″N 93°50′18″W

Clayton was the name of a town in section 4 of Seely Township, Faribault County, Minnesota, United States.

== History ==
Clayton had a post office from 1860 until 1899. The town failed to develop as hoped, and the population dwindled and the buildings were moved to neighboring Bricelyn, until in 1977 only the cemetery remained.
