= Minnesota State Highway 254 =

State highway in Minnesota, United States

Trunk Highway 254
- MN 254 highlighted in red

Route information
- Maintained by MnDOT
- Length: 4.796 mi (7.718 km)
- Existed: July 1, 1949–October 1, 2019

Major junctions
- South end: CSAH 17 at Frost
- North end: I-90 at Emerald Township

Location
- Country: United States
- State: Minnesota
- Counties: Faribault

Highway system
- Minnesota Trunk Highway System; Interstate; US; State; Legislative; Scenic
| ← MN 253 | → MN 257 |

Minnesota State Highway 254 (MN 254) was a 4.796-mile-long (7.718 km) highway in south-central Minnesota, which ran from its intersection with Faribault County Road 17 in the city of Frost and continued north to its northern terminus at its interchange with Interstate 90 in Emerald Township, 8 miles east of Blue Earth.

In 2019, the route was marked as Faribault County State-Aid Highway 17.

== Route description ==
Highway 254 served as a short north–south connector route in south-central Minnesota between the city of Frost and Interstate 90.

Highway 254 crossed the East Branch Blue Earth River near its intersection with County Road 16 in Emerald Township.

The route was legally defined as Route 254 in the Minnesota Statutes.

== History ==
MN 254 was authorized on July 1, 1949. Originally, it traveled from U.S. Route 16 (US 16) south through Frost to Iowa Highway 322 (renumbered 254 in 1969) at the state line near Rake, Iowa.

The route was paved between US 16 and Frost in 1950. The remainder was paved in the mid-1950s.

The part of MN 254 south of Frost was removed from statute in 1988 and turned back to Faribault County. It is now marked County Road 17.

On October 1, 2019, the state transferred ownership to Faribault County and the road is no longer part of the state highway system.

== Major intersections ==
The entire route is in Faribault County.

| Location | mi | km | Destinations | Notes |
|---|---|---|---|---|
| Frost | 5.843 | 9.403 | CSAH 17 south (1st Street) / CSAH 55 | |
| Emerald Township | 10.032 | 16.145 | CSAH 16 | Former U.S. 16 |
| Emerald Township | 10.490– 10.648 | 16.882– 17.136 | I-90 / CSAH 17 north – Blue Earth, Austin | Interchange |
1.000 mi = 1.609 km; 1.000 km = 0.621 mi
