= Pilot Grove Township =

Pilot Grove Township may refer to:

- Pilot Grove Township, Hancock County, Illinois
- Pilot Grove Township, Montgomery County, Iowa, in Montgomery County, Iowa
- Pilot Grove Township, Faribault County, Minnesota
- Pilot Grove Township, Cooper County, Missouri
- Pilot Grove Township, Moniteau County, Missouri
