= Beauford =

Beauford may refer to:

First name:

- Beauford H. Jester (1893–1949), American politician
- Beauford T. Anderson (1922–1996), United States Army soldier
- Beauford Delaney (1901–1979), African-American artist

Surname:

- Carter Beauford (born 1958), American musician
- Clayton Beauford (born 1963), American football player

Places

- Beauford Township, Blue Earth County, Minnesota, United States
- Beauford, Minnesota, an unincorporated community, United States

Other:

- Beauford automobiles
- Beauford (horse)
