= Pilot Grove =

Pilot Grove can refer to some places in the United States:

- Pilot Grove, Iowa
- Pilot Grove (historic site), listed on the National Register of Historic Places in Iowa County, Iowa
- Pilot Grove, Missouri
- Pilot Grove Township, Minnesota
- Pilot Grove, Minnesota
- Pilot Grove, Texas
