= Dunbar Township =

Dunbar Township may refer to the following townships in the United States:

- Dunbar Township, Faribault County, Minnesota
- Dunbar Township, Fayette County, Pennsylvania
