= Baroda (disambiguation) =

Baroda is another common name for the city of Vadodara in Gujarat, India.

Baroda may also refer to:

- Baroda Residency, which acceded to India in 1947
- Baroda State, a former Indian princely state in modern-day Gujarat
- Baroda, Western India and Gujarat States Agency, an agency of British India
- Baroda, Michigan, US
- Baroda Township, Michigan, US
- Baroda, Minnesota, US
- Baroda, the Ghost Hunter, a fictional character created by Sharadindu Bandyopadhyay
- Bank of Baroda, an Indian public sector bank
