= Huntley, Minnesota =

Unincorporated community in Minnesota, United States

Huntley
- Unincorporated community
- Location within Minnesota Location within the United States
- Coordinates: 43°43′54″N 94°14′15″W
- Country: United States
- State: Minnesota
- County: Faribault
- Elevation: 1,096 ft (334 m)
- Time zone: UTC-6 (Central (CST))
  - Summer (DST): UTC-5 (CDT)
- ZIP code: 56047
- Area code: 507
- GNIS feature ID: 645303

Huntley is an unincorporated community in Faribault County, Minnesota, United States. Huntley is 4.5 miles (7.2 km) southwest of Winnebago. Huntley has a post office with ZIP code 56047.

== History ==
Huntley was laid out in 1879, and named for Henry M. Huntington, an early settler. A post office was established at Huntley in 1879.
