= Delavan Township =

Delavan Township may refer to the following townships in the United States:

- Delavan Township, Tazewell County, Illinois
- Delavan Township, Faribault County, Minnesota
