= Winnebago City Township, Faribault County, Minnesota =

Township in Minnesota, United States

Winnebago City Township
- Township
- Location within the state of Minnesota Winnebago City Township (the United States)
- Coordinates: 43°47′11″N 94°11′45″W
- Country: United States
- State: Minnesota
- County: Faribault

Area
  - Total: 34.5 sq mi (89.3 km^{2})
  - Land: 34.4 sq mi (89.2 km^{2})
  - Water: 0.039 sq mi (0.1 km^{2})
- Elevation: 1,073 ft (327 m)

Population (2000)
  - Total: 221
  - Density: 6.5/sq mi (2.5/km^{2})
- Time zone: UTC-6 (Central (CST))
  - Summer (DST): UTC-5 (CDT)
- FIPS code: 27-70978
- GNIS feature ID: 0666023

Winnebago City Township is a township in Faribault County, Minnesota, United States. The population was 221 at the 2000 census.

== History ==
Winnebago City Township was organized in 1858, and named after its largest settlement, Winnebago.

== Geography ==
According to the United States Census Bureau, the township has a total area of 34.5 square miles (89.3 km^{2}), of which 34.4 square miles (89.2 km^{2}) is land and 0.04 square mile (0.1 km^{2}) (0.12%) is water.

== Demographics ==
As of the census of 2000, there were 221 people, 80 households, and 63 families residing in the township. The population density was 6.4 people per square mile (2.5/km^{2}). There were 96 housing units at an average density of 2.8/sq mi (1.1/km^{2}). The racial makeup of the township was 99.10% White, 0.45% Asian, and 0.45% from two or more races. Hispanic or Latino of any race were 0.45% of the population.

There were 80 households, out of which 38.8% had children under the age of 18 living with them, 68.8% were married couples living together, 5.0% had a female householder with no husband present, and 21.3% were non-families. 18.8% of all households were made up of individuals, and 6.3% had someone living alone who was 65 years of age or older. The average household size was 2.76 and the average family size was 3.06.

In the township the population was spread out, with 27.6% under the age of 18, 6.8% from 18 to 24, 27.1% from 25 to 44, 27.1% from 45 to 64, and 11.3% who were 65 years of age or older. The median age was 39 years. For every 100 females, there were 112.5 males. For every 100 females age 18 and over, there were 110.5 males.

The median income for a household in the township was $39,375, and the median income for a family was $48,333. Males had a median income of $29,464 versus $17,250 for females. The per capita income for the township was $14,458. About 7.6% of families and 13.1% of the population were below the poverty line, including 7.0% of those under the age of eighteen and 12.0% of those 65 or over.
