= Prescott Township =

Prescott Township may refer to:

- Prescott Township, Adams County, Iowa
- Prescott Township, Faribault County, Minnesota
- Prescott Township, Renville County, North Dakota, in Renville County, North Dakota
