= Brush Creek, Minnesota =

Unincorporated community in Minnesota, United States

Brush Creek
- Unincorporated community
- Location within Minnesota Location within the United States
- Coordinates: 43°38′41″N 93°50′54″W
- Country: United States
- State: Minnesota
- County: Faribault
- Elevation: 1,132 ft (345 m)
- Time zone: UTC-6 (Central (CST))
  - Summer (DST): UTC-5 (CDT)
- Area code: 507
- GNIS feature ID: 640558

Brush Creek is an unincorporated community in Brush Creek Township, Faribault County, Minnesota, United States.
