= Homedahl, Minnesota =

Ghost town in Minnesota, United States

Coordinates: 43.5179°N 93.8688°W

Homedahl is an abandoned townsite in sections 29 and 30 of Seely Township in Faribault County, Minnesota, United States.

== History ==
The town was originally settled by the Osul Haaland family, Norwegian immigrants. Rasmus O. Haaland was the first postmaster, and named the post office in honor of a "[remembered] location in Norway." The village had a station of the Chicago, Rock Island and Pacific Railroad, and the post office lasted from 1877 to 1904.
