= Emerald Township =

Emerald Township may refer to the following townships in the United States:

- Emerald Township, Faribault County, Minnesota
- Emerald Township, Paulding County, Ohio
