= Brush Creek (Minnesota) =

Stream in Faribault County, Minnesota, U.S.

Coordinates: 43°36′14″N 93°47′45″W

Brush Creek is a stream in Faribault County, in the U.S. state of Minnesota. Brush Creek was named for the dense brush along its banks.

== See also ==
- List of rivers of Minnesota
