= Beauford Township, Blue Earth County, Minnesota =

Township in Minnesota, United States

Beauford Township
- Township
- Location within the state of Minnesota Beauford Township (the United States)
- Coordinates: 43°59′27″N 93°55′53″W
- Country: United States
- State: Minnesota
- County: Blue Earth

Area
  - Total: 35.9 sq mi (92.9 km^{2})
  - Land: 35.6 sq mi (92.1 km^{2})
  - Water: 0.31 sq mi (0.8 km^{2})
- Elevation: 1,020 ft (310 m)

Population (2000)
  - Total: 442
  - Density: 12/sq mi (4.8/km^{2})
- Time zone: UTC-6 (Central (CST))
  - Summer (DST): UTC-5 (CDT)
- FIPS code: 27-04330
- GNIS feature ID: 0663534
- Website: https://beaufordtownship.com/

Beauford Township is a township in Blue Earth County, Minnesota, United States. The population was 442 as of the 2000 census.

== Geography ==
According to the United States Census Bureau, the township has an area of 35.9 square miles (93 km^{2}), of which 35.5 square miles (92 km^{2}) is land and 0.3 square miles (0.78 km^{2}) (0.86%) is water.

=== Unincorporated community ===
- Beauford at 44.007465°N 93.958563°W

=== Major highway ===
- Minnesota State Highway 22

=== Lake ===
- Perch Lake (western three-quarters)

=== Adjacent townships ===
- Decoria Township (north)
- McPherson Township (northeast)
- Medo Township (east)
- Danville Township (southeast)
- Mapleton Township (south)
- Sterling Township (southwest)
- Lyra Township (west)
- Rapidan Township (northwest)

=== Cemeteries ===
The township includes the following cemeteries: Beauford and Oak Hill.

== Demographics ==
As of the census of 2000, the township had 442 people, 159 households, and 123 families. The population density was 12.4 people per square mile (4.8/km^{2}). There were 163 housing units at an average density of 4.6/sq mi (1.8/km^{2}). The township's racial makeup was 98.64% White, 0.68% Asian, 0.23% from other races, and 0.45% from two or more races. Hispanic or Latino of any race were 0.90% of the population.

There were 159 households, of which 36.5% had children under the age of 18 living with them, 67.3% were married couples living together, 5.7% had a female householder with no husband present, and 22.6% were non-families. 17.0% of all households were made up of individuals, and 9.4% had someone living alone who was 65 years of age or older. The average household size was 2.78 and the average family size was 3.15.

29.0% of the township's residents were under age 18, 7.5% were from age 18 to 24, 28.5% were from age 25 to 44, 20.1% were from age 45 to 64, and 14.9% were age 65 or older. The median age was 36 years. For every 100 females, there were 104.6 males. For every 100 females age 18 and over, there were 107.9 males.

The township's median household income was $43,542, and the median family income was $47,656. Males had a median income of $33,333 versus $27,500 for females. The township's per capita income was $18,029. About 4.7% of families and 5.5% of the population were below the poverty line, including 3.5% of those under age 18 and 10.7% of those age 65 or over.

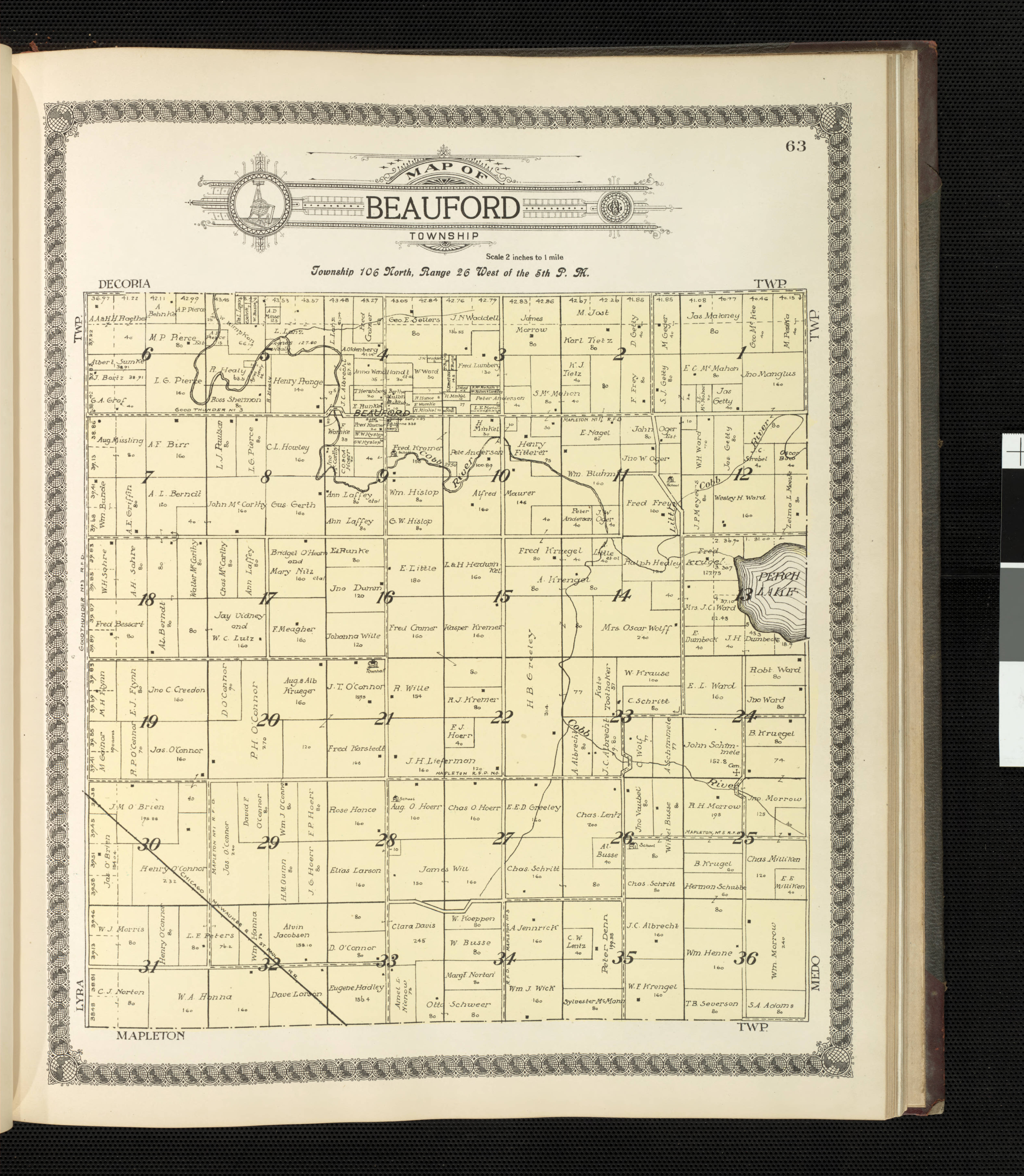
Beauford Township Plat Map from the Standard Atlas, Blue Earth County, Minnesota
