= Minnesota State Highway 22 =

State highway in Minnesota, United States

Trunk Highway 22
- MN 22 highlighted in red

Route information
- Maintained by MnDOT
- Length: 166.325 mi (267.674 km)
- Existed: 1920–present
- Tourist routes: Minnesota River Valley Scenic Byway

Major junctions
- South end: CR R50 at the Minnesota – Iowa state line near Kiester
- I-90 near Wells; MN 109 at Wells; MN 30 at Mapleton; US 14 at Mankato; US 169 / MN 99 at St. Peter; MN 5 / MN 19 at Gaylord; US 212 at Glencoe; MN 7 / MN 15 at Hutchinson; US 12 / MN 24 at Litchfield; MN 55 at Eden Valley
- North end: MN 23 at Richmond

Location
- Country: United States
- State: Minnesota
- Counties: Faribault, Blue Earth, Le Sueur, Nicollet, Sibley, McLeod, Meeker, Stearns

Highway system
- Minnesota Trunk Highway System; Interstate; US; State; Legislative; Scenic
← MN 21	→ MN 23

Minnesota State Highway 22 (MN 22) is a 166.325-mile-long (267.674 km) highway in south-central and central Minnesota, which runs from Winnebago County Road R50 at the Iowa state line near Kiester and continues north to its northern terminus at its intersection with State Highway 23 in Richmond, west of St. Cloud.

== Route description ==
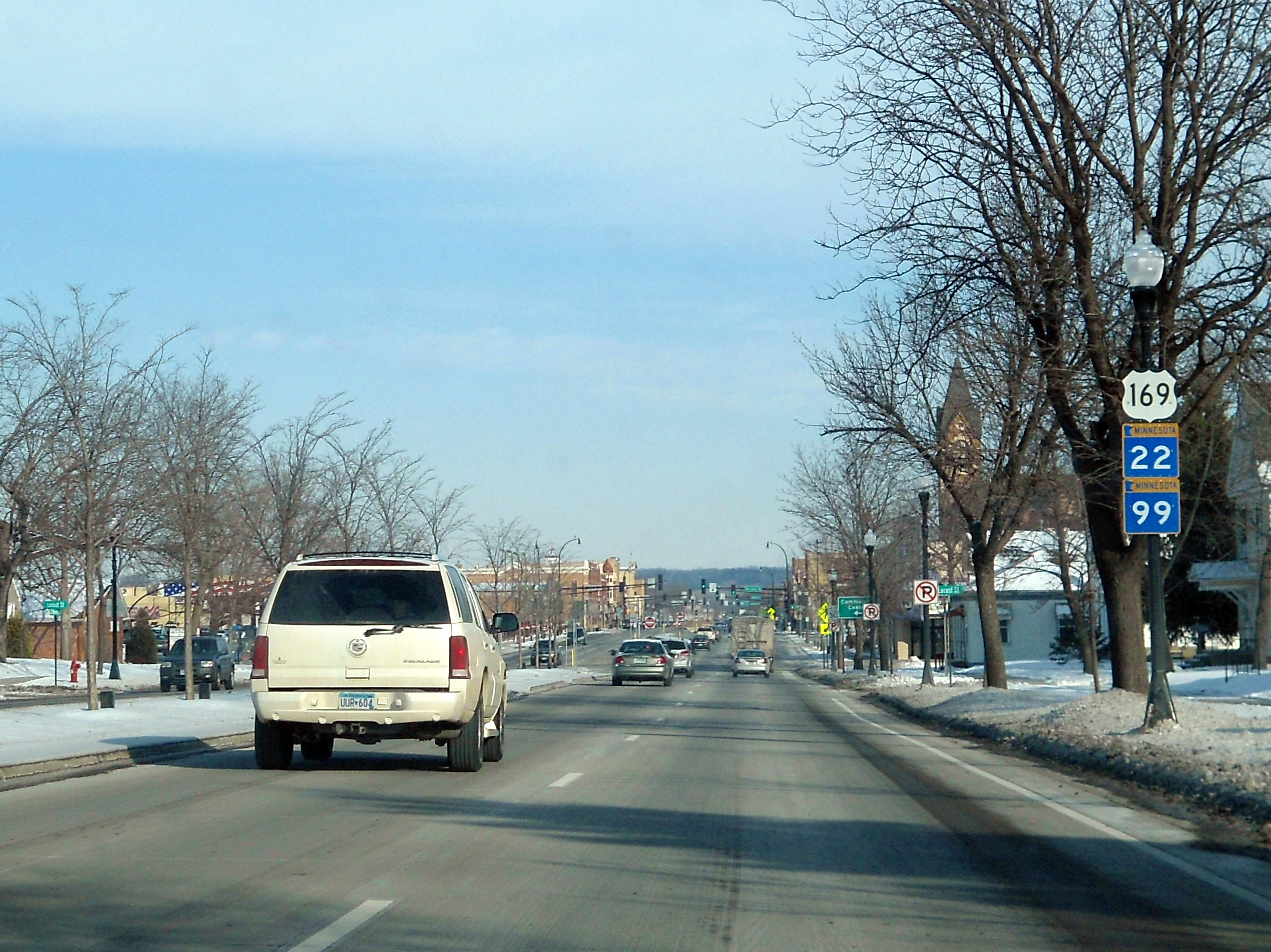
MN 22 concurrent with US 169 and MN 99 in St. Peter

State Highway 22 serves as a north–south route between Wells, Mankato, St. Peter, Gaylord, Glencoe, Hutchinson, Litchfield, and Richmond.

Highway 22 parallels State Highway 15 throughout its route. Highway 22 also intersects with Highway 15 at Hutchinson.

The route crosses the Minnesota River between St. Peter and Kasota.

Highway 22 is built as a four-lane divided highway on the east side of Mankato.

The southern terminus for Highway 22 is at the Iowa state line, near Kiester, where Highway 22 becomes Winnebago County Road R50 (140th Avenue) upon crossing the state line.

== History ==
State Highway 22 was authorized in 1920 from St. Peter to Paynesville. In 1934, it was extended south to the Iowa state line, and its northernmost section between Eden Valley and Paynesville became part of State Highway 55.

The section of Highway 22 between Mankato and St. Peter follows the original route of U.S. Highway 169. When the parallel route west of the Minnesota River was first completed in the late 1950s, it originally carried the Highway 22 designation for a few years until it was redesignated U.S. 169 and Highway 22 reverted to its original alignment.

From 1934 to 1961, the northern terminus for Highway 22 was at its intersection with State Highway 55 in Eden Valley. The Highway 22 designation was extended north to Richmond in 1961. Highway 22 will be redone from Mapleton to CO RD 90 just south of Mankato starting March 27, 2017, with the project finalizing in 2019. It will be a 3 part project, with the first stage being Mapleton to Beauford in 2017. In 2018 from Beauford to CO RD 90. Finally in 2019 the Victory Drive Memorial will be finished.

Highway 22 was paved in its entirety by 1953.

The new alignment section of Highway 22 on the southeast side of Mankato to U.S. Highway 14 was constructed c. 1990.

== Major intersections ==
County	Location	mi	km	Destinations	Notes
Faribault	Kiester Township	0.000	0.000	CR R50	Continuation into Iowa
Faribault	Foster Township	10.737	17.280	CSAH 16 east	Southern end of CSAH 16 overlap; formerly US 16
Faribault	Foster Township	11.801	18.992	CSAH 16 west / CR 118	Northern end of CSAH 16 overlap; formerly US 16
Faribault	Foster Township	12.072– 12.183	19.428– 19.607	I-90 – Albert Lea, Blue Earth	I-90 Exit 138
Faribault	Wells	18.270	29.403	MN 109 west – Airport	Southern end of MN 109 overlap
Faribault	Wells	18.444	29.683	MN 109 east / CSAH 29 – Alden	Northern end of MN 109 overlap
Blue Earth	Mapleton Township	32.475	52.263	MN 30 east / CSAH 29 – New Richland	Southern end of MN 30 overlap
Blue Earth	Mapleton	35.062	56.427	MN 30 west / CSAH 21 – Amboy	Northern end of MN 30 overlap
Blue Earth	Mankato	50.560	81.368	MN 83 east / CSAH 60 – St. Clair	
Blue Earth	Mankato	52.053	83.771	CSAH 17 (Madison Avenue)	Formerly US 14 / MN 60
Blue Earth	Mankato	52.563– 52.658	84.592– 84.745	US 14 / MN 60	Interchange
Le Sueur	Kasota	62.622	100.780	CSAH 21 / Minnesota River Valley Scenic Byway	Southern end of Minnesota River Valley Scenic Byway overlap
Nicollet	St. Peter	64.074	103.117	US 169 south / MN 99 west	Southern end of US 169 / MN 99 overlap
Nicollet	St. Peter			MN 99 east / Minnesota River Valley Scenic Byway – Le Center	Northern end of MN 99 / Minnesota River Valley Scenic Byway overlap
Nicollet	St. Peter	65.934	106.110	US 169 north	Northern end of US 169 overlap
Nicollet	New Sweden Township	79.597	128.099	MN 111 / CR 60 – Nicollet	
Sibley	Gaylord	89.846	144.593	MN 5 / MN 19 east	Eastern end of MN 5 / MN 19 overlap
Sibley	Gaylord	89.987	144.820	MN 19 west / MN 5 ends	Western end of MN 5 / MN 19 overlap
McLeod	Glencoe Township	103.338	166.306	US 212 west – Brownton	Western end of US 212 overlap
McLeod	Glencoe	106.633	171.609	US 212 east – Minneapolis	Eastern end of US 212 overlap
McLeod	Hutchinson	121.192	195.040	MN 7 east – Silver Lake	Eastern end of MN 7 overlap
McLeod	Hutchinson	122.120	196.533	MN 15 – Ridgewater College	
McLeod	Acoma Township	129.945	209.126	MN 7 west – Cosmos, Montevideo	Western end of MN 7 overlap
Meeker	Litchfield	143.080	230.265	US 12 east	Southern end of US 12 overlap
Meeker	Litchfield			MN 24 – Kimball	
Meeker	Litchfield Township	145.125	233.556	US 12 west – Willmar	Northern end of US 12 overlap
Meeker	Eden Valley	156.901	252.508	MN 55 – Kimball, Paynesville	
Stearns	Richmond	167.063	268.862	MN 23 / CSAH 9 – Cold Spring, Roscoe	
1.000 mi = 1.609 km; 1.000 km = 0.621 mi: Concurrency terminus
