= Clark W. Thompson =

Clark W. Thompson may refer to:

- Clark W. Thompson (Minnesota politician) (1825–1885), Minnesota State Senator
- Clark W. Thompson (Texas politician) (1896–1981), U.S. Representative from Texas
