= Pilot Grove, Minnesota =

Unincorporated community in Minnesota, United States

Pilot Grove
- Unincorporated community
- Location within Minnesota Location within the United States
- Coordinates: 43°31′45″N 94°13′40″W
- Country: United States
- State: Minnesota
- County: Faribault
- Elevation: 1,129 ft (344 m)
- Time zone: UTC-6 (Central (CST))
  - Summer (DST): UTC-5 (CDT)
- Area code: 507
- GNIS feature ID: 649435

Pilot Grove is an unincorporated community in Pilot Grove Township, Faribault County, Minnesota, United States.
