= Harland G. Wood =

American biochemist (1907–1991)

- Born: Harland Goff Wood; September 2, 1907; Delavan, Minnesota
- Died: September 12, 1991 (aged 84); Cleveland, Ohio
- Education: Macalester College, Iowa State University
- Known for: Fixation of CO_{2} by animals and bacteria
- Spouse: Mildred Davis
- Children: Two daughters
- Awards: Eli Lilly and Company-Elanco Research Award, Rosenstiel Award, National Medal of Science
- Scientific career
- Fields: Biochemistry
- Institutions: Iowa State University, University of Minnesota, Western Reserve University (later Case Western Reserve University)

Harland Goff Wood (September 2, 1907 – September 12, 1991) was an American biochemist notable for proving in 1935 that animals, humans and bacteria fixed carbon from carbon dioxide in the metabolic pathway to succinate. (Previously CO_{2} fixation had been thought to occur only in plants and a few unusual autotrophic bacteria.)

== Awards and honours ==
Wood was a recipient of the National Medal of Science. He was on the President's Science Advisory Committee under Presidents Lyndon B. Johnson and Richard Nixon. He was also a member of the National Academy of Sciences, a member of the American Academy of Arts and Sciences, and of the Biochemical Society of Japan. He was also first director of the department of biochemistry at the School of Medicine and dean of sciences, Case Western Reserve University.

== Chronology ==
- 1907: born in Delavan, MN, to Inez Goff and William Clark Wood
- 1931: B.A. Macalester College
- 1935: Ph.D. Iowa State University
- 1936-1943: taught Bacteriology at Iowa State University
- 1943-1946: taught Physiology at the University of Minnesota
- 1946-67: director of the Department of Biochemistry at the School of Medicine, Case Western Reserve University
