= Kiester Township, Faribault County, Minnesota =

Township in Minnesota, United States

Kiester Township
- Township
- Location within the state of Minnesota Kiester Township (the United States)
- Coordinates: 43°32′49″N 93°43′5″W
- Country: United States
- State: Minnesota
- County: Faribault

Area
  - Total: 35.8 sq mi (92.8 km^{2})
  - Land: 35.8 sq mi (92.8 km^{2})
  - Water: 0 sq mi (0.0 km^{2})
- Elevation: 1,260 ft (384 m)

Population (2000)
  - Total: 320
  - Density: 8.8/sq mi (3.4/km^{2})
- Time zone: UTC-6 (Central (CST))
  - Summer (DST): UTC-5 (CDT)
- ZIP code: 56051
- Area code: 507
- FIPS code: 27-33074
- GNIS feature ID: 0664627

Kiester Township (/ˈkiːstər/ KEE-stər) is a township in Faribault County, Minnesota, United States. The population was 320 at the 2000 census.

Kiester Township was organized in 1872, and named for Jacob Kiester, a local historian who afterward served as state legislator.

== Geography ==
According to the United States Census Bureau, the township has a total area of 35.8 square miles (93 km^{2}), all land.

Minnesota State Highway 22 serves as a main route in the township.

== Demographics ==
As of the census of 2000, there were 320 people, 120 households, and 101 families residing in the township. The population density was 8.9 inhabitants per square mile (3.4/km^{2}). There were 131 housing units at an average density of 3.7 per square mile (1.4/km^{2}). The racial makeup of the township was 98.12% White, 0.31% African American, 0.31% Native American, 0.31% from other races, and 0.94% from two or more races. Hispanic or Latino of any race were 0.62% of the population.

There were 120 households, out of which 35.0% had children under the age of 18 living with them, 75.0% were married couples living together, 7.5% had a female householder with no husband present, and 15.8% were non-families. 13.3% of all households were made up of individuals, and 9.2% had someone living alone who was 65 years of age or older. The average household size was 2.67 and the average family size was 2.91.

In the township the population was spread out, with 25.6% under the age of 18, 8.4% from 18 to 24, 27.2% from 25 to 44, 22.8% from 45 to 64, and 15.9% who were 65 years of age or older. The median age was 40 years. For every 100 females, there were 122.2 males. For every 100 females age 18 and over, there were 107.0 males.

The median income for a household in the township was $37,188, and the median income for a family was $39,205. Males had a median income of $25,208 versus $18,750 for females. The per capita income for the township was $17,258. About 5.3% of families and 7.7% of the population were below the poverty line, including 18.8% of those under age 18 and 3.6% of those age 65 or over.

== In popular culture ==
On June 7, 2016, a Preparation H television commercial debuted that was filmed in Kiester.

== Notable people ==
- Steve Heitzeg, composer (born 1959) — grew up on a farm near Keister.
