= Rome Township, Faribault County, Minnesota =

Township in Minnesota, United States

Rome Township
- Township
- Location within the state of Minnesota Rome Township (the United States)
- Coordinates: 43°32′59″N 93°56′44″W
- Country: United States
- State: Minnesota
- County: Faribault

Area
  - Total: 35.7 sq mi (92.5 km^{2})
  - Land: 35.7 sq mi (92.5 km^{2})
  - Water: 0 sq mi (0.0 km^{2})
- Elevation: 1,119 ft (341 m)

Population (2000)
  - Total: 172
  - Density: 4.9/sq mi (1.9/km^{2})
- Time zone: UTC-6 (Central (CST))
  - Summer (DST): UTC-5 (CDT)
- FIPS code: 27-55348
- GNIS feature ID: 0665451

Rome Township is a township in Faribault County, Minnesota, United States. The population was 172 at the 2000 census.

Rome Township was organized in 1868, and named after Rome, in Italy.

== Geography ==
According to the United States Census Bureau, the township has a total area of 35.7 square miles (92.5 km^{2}), all land.

== Demographics ==
As of the census of 2000, there were 172 people, 73 households, and 57 families residing in the township. The population density was 4.8 people per square mile (1.9/km^{2}). There were 74 housing units at an average density of 2.1/sq mi (0.8/km^{2}). The racial makeup of the township was 98.26% White, 1.16% Asian, 0.58% from other races. Hispanic or Latino of any race were 5.23% of the population.

There were 73 households, out of which 26.0% had children under the age of 18 living with them, 68.5% were married couples living together, 1.4% had a female householder with no husband present, and 21.9% were non-families. 19.2% of all households were made up of individuals, and 6.8% had someone living alone who was 65 years of age or older. The average household size was 2.36 and the average family size was 2.68.

In the township the population was spread out, with 19.8% under the age of 18, 9.3% from 18 to 24, 19.2% from 25 to 44, 33.7% from 45 to 64, and 18.0% who were 65 years of age or older. The median age was 47 years. For every 100 females, there were 132.4 males. For every 100 females age 18 and over, there were 122.6 males.

The median income for a household in the township was $37,500, and the median income for a family was $40,208. Males had a median income of $20,625 versus $25,625 for females. The per capita income for the township was $19,896. About 3.1% of families and 6.3% of the population were below the poverty line, including 8.0% of those under the age of eighteen and none of those 65 or over.
