= Elmore Township, Faribault County, Minnesota =

Township in Minnesota, United States

Elmore Township
- Township
- Location within the state of Minnesota Elmore Township (the United States)
- Coordinates: 43°32′9″N 94°4′36″W
- Country: United States
- State: Minnesota
- County: Faribault

Area
  - Total: 35.0 sq mi (90.7 km^{2})
  - Land: 35.0 sq mi (90.7 km^{2})
  - Water: 0 sq mi (0.0 km^{2})
- Elevation: 1,109 ft (338 m)

Population (2000)
  - Total: 203
  - Density: 5.7/sq mi (2.2/km^{2})
- Time zone: UTC-6 (Central (CST))
  - Summer (DST): UTC-5 (CDT)
- ZIP code: 56027
- Area code: 507
- FIPS code: 27-19016
- GNIS feature ID: 0664087

Elmore Township is a township in Faribault County, Minnesota, United States. The population was 203 at the 2000 census.

Elmore Township was organized in 1858, and named for Andrew E. Elmore, a Wisconsin legislator.

== Geography ==
According to the United States Census Bureau, the township has a total area of 35.0 square miles (91 km^{2}), all land.

== Demographics ==
As of the census of 2000, there were 203 people, 87 households, and 66 families residing in the township. The population density was 5.8 inhabitants per square mile (2.2/km^{2}). There were 97 housing units at an average density of 2.8 per square mile (1.1/km^{2}). The racial makeup of the township was 96.06% White, 0.49% African American, 2.46% from other races, and 0.99% from two or more races. Hispanic or Latino of any race were 3.45% of the population.

There were 87 households, out of which 25.3% had children under the age of 18 living with them, 70.1% were married couples living together, 5.7% had a female householder with no husband present, and 23.0% were non-families. 23.0% of all households were made up of individuals, and 11.5% had someone living alone who was 65 years of age or older. The average household size was 2.33 and the average family size was 2.69.

In the township the population was spread out, with 20.7% under the age of 18, 5.4% from 18 to 24, 15.3% from 25 to 44, 38.4% from 45 to 64, and 20.2% who were 65 years of age or older. The median age was 49 years. For every 100 females, there were 103.0 males. For every 100 females age 18 and over, there were 106.4 males.

The median income for a household in the township was $31,806, and the median income for a family was $34,000. Males had a median income of $37,188 versus $18,542 for females. The per capita income for the township was $25,557. About 5.9% of families and 8.6% of the population were below the poverty line, including 25.8% of those under the age of eighteen and 3.4% of those 65 or over.
