= Pilot Grove Township, Moniteau County, Missouri =

Township in Moniteau County, Missouri, U.S.

Coordinates: 38.5475°N 92.6350°W

Pilot Grove Township is an inactive township in Moniteau County, in the U.S. state of Missouri.

Pilot Grove Township was established in 1854, taking its name from Pilot Branch.
