= Baroda, Minnesota =

Unincorporated community in Minnesota, United States

Baroda
- Unincorporated community
- Location within Minnesota Location within the United States
- Coordinates: 43°43′15″N 93°40′30″W
- Country: United States
- State: Minnesota
- County: Faribault
- Elevation: 1,184 ft (361 m)
- Time zone: UTC-6 (Central (CST))
  - Summer (DST): UTC-5 (CDT)
- Area code: 507
- GNIS feature ID: 654587

Baroda is an unincorporated community in Clark Township, Faribault County, Minnesota, United States.
