= Brush Creek Township, Faribault County, Minnesota =

Township in Minnesota, United States

Brush Creek Township
- Township
- Location within the state of Minnesota Brush Creek Township (the United States)
- Coordinates: 43°38′16″N 93°49′5″W
- Country: United States
- State: Minnesota
- County: Faribault

Area
  - Total: 36.1 sq mi (93.5 km^{2})
  - Land: 35.1 sq mi (91.0 km^{2})
  - Water: 0.97 sq mi (2.5 km^{2})
- Elevation: 1,161 ft (354 m)

Population (2000)
  - Total: 241
  - Density: 6.7/sq mi (2.6/km^{2})
- Time zone: UTC-6 (Central (CST))
  - Summer (DST): UTC-5 (CDT)
- FIPS code: 27-08380
- GNIS feature ID: 0663692

Brush Creek Township is a township in Faribault County, Minnesota, United States. The population was 241 at the 2000 census.

== History ==
Brush Creek Township was organized in 1858, taking its name from Brush Creek.

== Geography ==
According to the United States Census Bureau, the township has a total area of 36.1 square miles (93 km^{2}), of which 35.1 square miles (91 km^{2}) is land and 0.9 square miles (2.3 km^{2}) (2.63%) is water.

== Demographics ==
As of the census of 2000, there were 241 people, 87 households, and 66 families residing in the township. The population density was 6.9 inhabitants per square mile (2.7/km^{2}). There were 96 housing units at an average density of 2.7 per square mile (1.0/km^{2}). The racial makeup of the township was 100.00% White. Hispanic or Latino of any race were 1.24% of the population.

There were 87 households, out of which 39.1% had children under the age of 18 living with them, 69.0% were married couples living together, 1.1% had a female householder with no husband present, and 24.1% were non-families. 20.7% of all households were made up of individuals, and 9.2% had someone living alone who was 65 years of age or older. The average household size was 2.77 and the average family size was 3.26.

In the township the population was spread out, with 32.0% under the age of 18, 5.0% from 18 to 24, 27.8% from 25 to 44, 17.4% from 45 to 64, and 17.8% who were 65 years of age or older. The median age was 35 years. For every 100 females, there were 117.1 males. For every 100 females age 18 and over, there were 115.8 males.

The median income for a household in the township was $44,063, and the median income for a family was $48,125. Males had a median income of $31,250 versus $21,111 for females. The per capita income for the township was $14,469. About 2.7% of families and 2.2% of the population were below the poverty line, including 2.2% of those under the age of eighteen and none of those 65 or over.
