= Minnesota Lake Township, Faribault County, Minnesota =

Township in Minnesota, United States

Minnesota Lake Township
- Township
- Location within the state of Minnesota Minnesota Lake Township (the United States)
- Coordinates: 43°48′7″N 93°49′48″W
- Country: United States
- State: Minnesota
- County: Faribault

Area
  - Total: 34.0 sq mi (88.1 km^{2})
  - Land: 31.4 sq mi (81.4 km^{2})
  - Water: 2.6 sq mi (6.7 km^{2})
- Elevation: 1,056 ft (322 m)

Population (2000)
  - Total: 237
  - Density: 7.5/sq mi (2.9/km^{2})
- Time zone: UTC-6 (Central (CST))
  - Summer (DST): UTC-5 (CDT)
- ZIP code: 56068
- Area code: 507
- FIPS code: 27-43216
- GNIS feature ID: 0664995

Minnesota Lake Township is a township in Faribault County, Minnesota, United States. The population was 237 at the 2000 census.

== Geography ==
According to the United States Census Bureau, the township has a total area of 34.0 square miles (88.1 km^{2}), of which 31.4 square miles (81.4 km^{2}) is land and 2.6 square miles (6.7 km^{2}) (7.61%) is water.

== Demographics ==
As of the census of 2000, there were 237 people, 83 households, and 70 families residing in the township. The population density was 7.5 people per square mile (2.9/km^{2}). There were 86 housing units at an average density of 2.7/sq mi (1.1/km^{2}). The racial makeup of the township was 100.00% White.

There were 83 households, out of which 39.8% had children under the age of 18 living with them, 73.5% were married couples living together, 4.8% had a female householder with no husband present, and 14.5% were non-families. 12.0% of all households were made up of individuals, and 6.0% had someone living alone who was 65 years of age or older. The average household size was 2.86 and the average family size was 3.11.

In the township the population was spread out, with 31.2% under the age of 18, 3.8% from 18 to 24, 26.6% from 25 to 44, 26.6% from 45 to 64, and 11.8% who were 65 years of age or older. The median age was 38 years. For every 100 females, there were 115.5 males. For every 100 females age 18 and over, there were 106.3 males.

The median income for a household in the township was $41,250, and the median income for a family was $46,667. Males had a median income of $21,250 versus $30,833 for females. The per capita income for the township was $23,788. About 7.4% of families and 10.6% of the population were below the poverty line, including 12.5% of those under the age of eighteen and 6.3% of those 65 or over.
