= Alden, Minnesota =

City in Minnesota, United States

Alden
- City
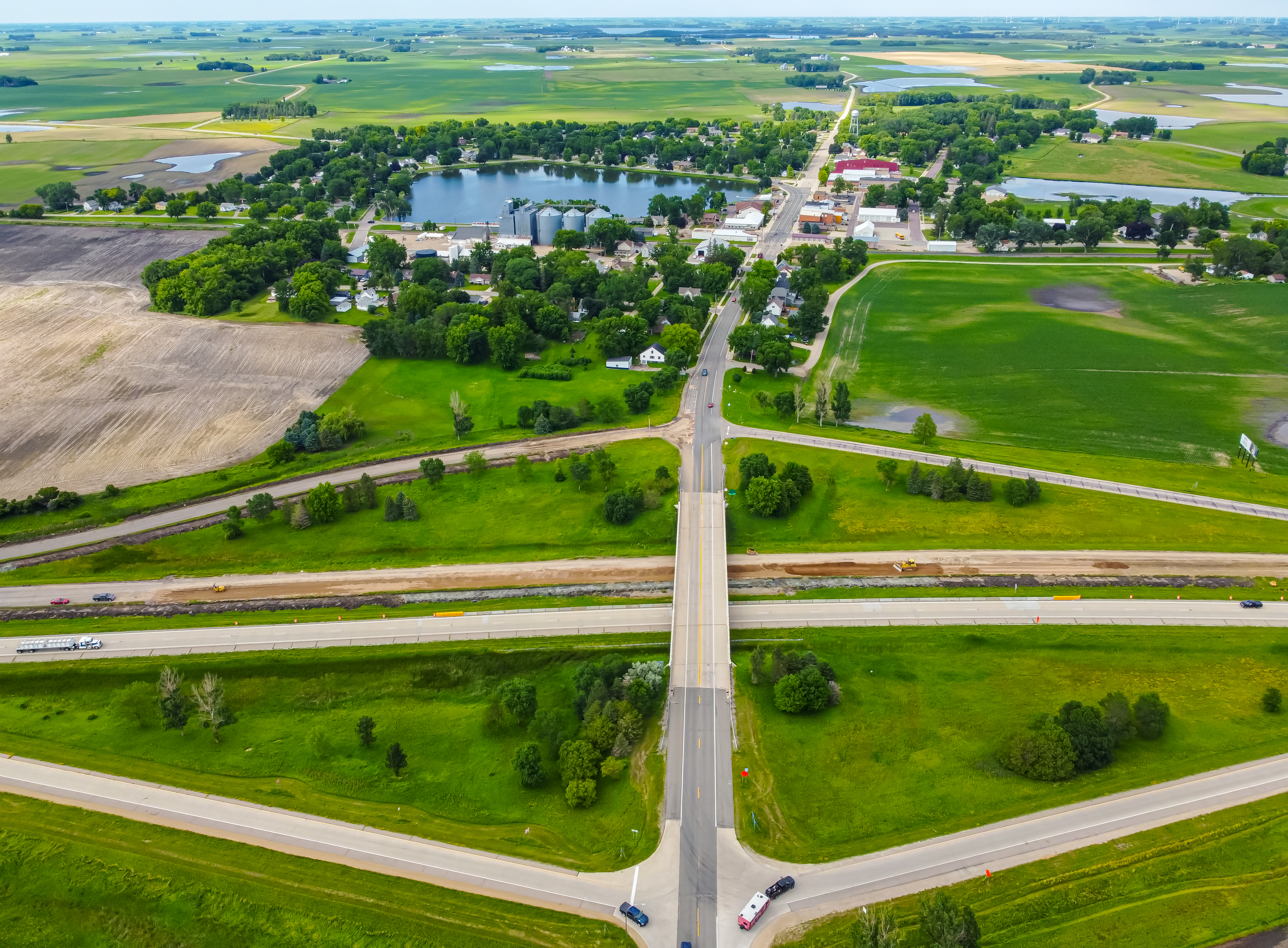
- Interstate-90 runs by town

- Location of Alden, Minnesota
- Coordinates: 43°40′10″N 93°34′25″W
- Country: United States
- State: Minnesota
- County: Freeborn

Area
  - Total: 1.00 sq mi (2.58 km^{2})
  - Land: 0.97 sq mi (2.50 km^{2})
  - Water: 0.031 sq mi (0.08 km^{2})
- Elevation: 1,260 ft (380 m)

Population (2020)
  - Total: 583
  - Density: 604.2/sq mi (233.29/km^{2})
- Time zone: UTC-6 (Central (CST))
  - Summer (DST): UTC-5 (CDT)
- ZIP code: 56009
- Area code: 507
- FIPS code: 27-00838
- GNIS feature ID: 2393910
- Website: www.aldenmn.com

Alden (/ˈɔːldɪn/ AWL-din) is a city in Freeborn County, Minnesota, United States. As of the 2020 census, Alden had a population of 583.

== History ==
A post office called Alden has been in operation since 1866. Alden was platted in 1869 when the railroad was extended to that point. Edmond Conn (1914-1998), farmer, businessman, and politician, was born in Alden.

== Geography ==
According to the United States Census Bureau, the city has a total area of 1.10 square miles (2.85 km^{2}), of which 1.07 square miles (2.77 km^{2}) is land and 0.03 square miles (0.08 km^{2}) is water.

Minnesota State Highway 109 and Interstate 90 are two of the main routes in the community.

== Demographics ==
Historical population
Census	Pop.	Note	%±
1880	235		—
1890	276		17.4%
1900	636		130.4%
1910	544		−14.5%
1920	530		−2.6%
1930	532		0.4%
1940	544		2.3%
1950	668		22.8%
1960	694		3.9%
1970	713		2.7%
1980	687		−3.6%
1990	623		−9.3%
2000	652		4.7%
2010	661		1.4%
2020	583		−11.8%
U.S. Decennial Census

=== 2010 census ===
As of the census of 2010, there were 661 people, 268 households, and 188 families living in the city. The population density was 617.8 inhabitants per square mile (238.5/km^{2}). There were 292 housing units at an average density of 272.9 per square mile (105.4/km^{2}). The racial makeup of the city was 96.7% White, 0.5% Native American, 0.5% Pacific Islander, 1.5% from other races, and 0.9% from two or more races. Hispanic or Latino of any race were 3.9% of the population.

There were 268 households, of which 34.3% had children under the age of 18 living with them, 56.3% were married couples living together, 9.3% had a female householder with no husband present, 4.5% had a male householder with no wife present, and 29.9% were non-families. 26.1% of all households were made up of individuals, and 13.1% had someone living alone who was 65 years of age or older. The average household size was 2.47 and the average family size was 2.96.

The median age in the city was 39.9 years. 26% of residents were under the age of 18; 8.1% were between the ages of 18 and 24; 23.3% were from 25 to 44; 25% were from 45 to 64; and 17.7% were 65 years of age or older. The gender makeup of the city was 48.1% male and 51.9% female.

=== 2000 census ===
As of the census of 2000, there were 652 people, 272 households, and 187 families living in the city. The population density was 680.1 inhabitants per square mile (262.6/km^{2}). There were 295 housing units at an average density of 307.7 per square mile (118.8/km^{2}). The racial makeup of the city was 97.70% White, 0.92% Asian, 1.23% from other races, and 0.15% from two or more races. Hispanic or Latino of any race were 3.07% of the population.

There were 272 households, out of which 29.4% had children under the age of 18 living with them, 59.9% were married couples living together, 5.5% had a female householder with no husband present, and 31.3% were non-families. 29.0% of all households were made up of individuals, and 17.6% had someone living alone who was 65 years of age or older. The average household size was 2.40 and the average family size was 2.91.

In the city, the population was spread out, with 24.8% under the age of 18, 6.7% from 18 to 24, 28.8% from 25 to 44, 18.7% from 45 to 64, and 20.9% who were 65 years of age or older. The median age was 39 years. For every 100 females, there were 94.0 males. For every 100 females age 18 and over, there were 87.7 males.

The median income for a household in the city was $40,000, and the median income for a family was $42,250. Males had a median income of $32,125 versus $20,909 for females. The per capita income for the city was $17,689. About 3.7% of families and 6.0% of the population were below the poverty line, including 1.3% of those under age 18 and 12.4% of those age 65 or over.

== Education ==
- Alden-Conger Schools site
