= Easton, Minnesota =

City in Minnesota, United States

Easton
- City
- Motto: "The Agri-Heart Of Southern Minnesota"
- Location of Easton, Minnesota
- Coordinates: 43°45′58″N 93°54′00″W
- Country: United States
- State: Minnesota
- County: Faribault

Government
  - Type: Mayor - Council
  - Mayor: Bryant Stiernagle

Area
  - Total: 0.95 sq mi (2.46 km^{2})
  - Land: 0.95 sq mi (2.46 km^{2})
  - Water: 0 sq mi (0.00 km^{2})
- Elevation: 1,063 ft (324 m)

Population (2020)
  - Total: 177
  - Density: 186.7/sq mi (72.07/km^{2})
- Time zone: UTC-6 (Central (CST))
  - Summer (DST): UTC-5 (CDT)
- ZIP code: 56025
- Area code: 507
- FIPS code: 27-17738
- GNIS feature ID: 2394609
- Website: City website

Easton is a city in Faribault County, Minnesota, United States. As of the 2020 census, Easton had a population of 177.

== History ==
Easton had its start when the railroad was extended to that point. The town was platted in 1873, and named for one of its founders, Jason Clark Easton. A post office has been in operation at Easton since 1874.

== Geography ==
According to the United States Census Bureau, the city has a total area of 0.93 square miles (2.41 km^{2}), all land.

== Demographics ==
Historical population
Census	Pop.	Note	%±
1880	68		—
1890	180		164.7%
1900	318		76.7%
1910	262		−17.6%
1920	326		24.4%
1930	297		−8.9%
1940	332		11.8%
1950	379		14.2%
1960	411		8.4%
1970	352		−14.4%
1980	283		−19.6%
1990	229		−19.1%
2000	214		−6.6%
2010	199		−7.0%
2020	177		−11.1%
U.S. Decennial Census

=== 2010 census ===
As of the census of 2010, there were 199 people, 89 households, and 63 families residing in the city. The population density was 214.0 inhabitants per square mile (82.6/km^{2}). There were 97 housing units at an average density of 104.3 per square mile (40.3/km^{2}). The racial makeup of the city was 97.5% White, 0.5% Native American, and 2.0% from other races. Hispanic or Latino of any race were 4.0% of the population.

There were 89 households, of which 28.1% had children under the age of 18 living with them, 51.7% were married couples living together, 10.1% had a female householder with no husband present, 9.0% had a male householder with no wife present, and 29.2% were non-families. 24.7% of all households were made up of individuals, and 13.5% had someone living alone who was 65 years of age or older. The average household size was 2.24 and the average family size was 2.54.

The median age in the city was 44.9 years. 22.6% of residents were under the age of 18; 4.9% were between the ages of 18 and 24; 22.5% were from 25 to 44; 30.1% were from 45 to 64; and 19.6% were 65 years of age or older. The gender makeup of the city was 49.7% male and 50.3% female.

=== 2000 census ===
As of the census of 2000, there were 214 people, 93 households, and 57 families residing in the city. The population density was 227.0 inhabitants per square mile (87.6/km^{2}). There were 99 housing units at an average density of 105.0 per square mile (40.5/km^{2}). The racial makeup of the city was 100.00% White.

There were 93 households, out of which 23.7% had children under the age of 18 living with them, 53.8% were married couples living together, 4.3% had a female householder with no husband present, and 38.7% were non-families. 29.0% of all households were made up of individuals, and 15.1% had someone living alone who was 65 years of age or older. The average household size was 2.30 and the average family size was 2.88.

In the city, the population was spread out, with 20.6% under the age of 18, 8.4% from 18 to 24, 25.7% from 25 to 44, 25.2% from 45 to 64, and 20.1% who were 65 years of age or older. The median age was 42 years. For every 100 females, there were 103.8 males. For every 100 females age 18 and over, there were 102.4 males.

The median income for a household in the city was $28,125, and the median income for a family was $30,625. Males had a median income of $25,000 versus $18,750 for females. The per capita income for the city was $17,095. About 11.1% of families and 14.7% of the population were below the poverty line, including 16.7% of those under the age of eighteen and none of those 65 or over.
