= Delavan Township, Faribault County, Minnesota =

Township in Minnesota, United States

Delavan Township
- Township
- Location within the state of Minnesota Delavan Township (the United States)
- Coordinates: 43°47′34″N 94°3′29″W
- Country: United States
- State: Minnesota
- County: Faribault

Area
  - Total: 35.5 sq mi (91.9 km^{2})
  - Land: 33.3 sq mi (86.2 km^{2})
  - Water: 2.2 sq mi (5.8 km^{2})
- Elevation: 1,040 ft (317 m)

Population (2000)
  - Total: 275
  - Density: 8.3/sq mi (3.2/km^{2})
- Time zone: UTC-6 (Central (CST))
  - Summer (DST): UTC-5 (CDT)
- ZIP code: 56023
- Area code: 507
- FIPS code: 27-15490
- GNIS feature ID: 0663957

Delavan Township is a township in Faribault County, Minnesota, United States. The population was 275 at the 2000 census.

Delavan Township was originally called Guthrie Township, and under the latter name was organized in 1858. It was renamed in 1872 after the city of Delavan, Minnesota.

== Geography ==
According to the United States Census Bureau, the township has a total area of 35.5 square miles (92 km^{2}), of which 33.3 square miles (86 km^{2}) is land and 2.2 square miles (5.7 km^{2}) (6.28%) is water.

== Demographics ==
As of the census of 2000, there were 275 people, 116 households, and 83 families residing in the township. The population density was 8.3 inhabitants per square mile (3.2/km^{2}). There were 158 housing units at an average density of 4.7 per square mile (1.8/km^{2}). The racial makeup of the township was 98.55% White, 1.09% Native American, and 0.36% from two or more races.

There were 116 households, out of which 25.0% had children under the age of 18 living with them, 66.4% were married couples living together, 2.6% had a female householder with no husband present, and 27.6% were non-families. 22.4% of all households were made up of individuals, and 12.1% had someone living alone who was 65 years of age or older. The average household size was 2.37 and the average family size was 2.81.

In the township the population was spread out, with 21.1% under the age of 18, 6.5% from 18 to 24, 26.2% from 25 to 44, 28.4% from 45 to 64, and 17.8% who were 65 years of age or older. The median age was 42 years. For every 100 females, there were 111.5 males. For every 100 females age 18 and over, there were 106.7 males.

The median income for a household in the township was $40,893, and the median income for a family was $44,167. Males had a median income of $35,781 versus $18,036 for females. The per capita income for the township was $24,100. About 2.6% of families and 4.5% of the population were below the poverty line, including none of those under the age of eighteen and 3.9% of those 65 or over.
