= Clark Township, Faribault County, Minnesota =

Township in Minnesota, United States

Clark Township
- Township
- Location within the state of Minnesota Clark Township (the United States)
- Coordinates: 43°43′16″N 93°42′49″W
- Country: United States
- State: Minnesota
- County: Faribault

Area
  - Total: 34.6 sq mi (89.7 km^{2})
  - Land: 34.6 sq mi (89.7 km^{2})
  - Water: 0 sq mi (0.0 km^{2})
- Elevation: 1,171 ft (357 m)

Population (2000)
  - Total: 459
  - Density: 13/sq mi (5.1/km^{2})
- Time zone: UTC-6 (Central (CST))
  - Summer (DST): UTC-5 (CDT)
- FIPS code: 27-11638
- GNIS feature ID: 0663808

Clark Township is a township in Faribault County, Minnesota, United States. The population was 459 at the 2000 census.

== History ==
Clark Township was organized in 1869, and named after Clark W. Thompson, a local landowner.

== Geography ==
According to the United States Census Bureau, the township has a total area of 34.6 square miles (90 km^{2}), all land.

== Demographics ==
As of the census of 2000, there were 459 people, 158 households, and 130 families residing in the township. The population density was 13.3 inhabitants per square mile (5.1/km^{2}). There were 175 housing units at an average density of 5.1 per square mile (2.0/km^{2}). The racial makeup of the township was 97.17% White, 0.22% African American, 0.22% Asian, 1.74% from other races, and 0.65% from two or more races. Hispanic or Latino of any race were 5.01% of the population.

There were 158 households, out of which 39.2% had children under the age of 18 living with them, 67.1% were married couples living together, 7.6% had a female householder with no husband present, and 17.7% were non-families. 14.6% of all households were made up of individuals, and 7.6% had someone living alone who was 65 years of age or older. The average household size was 2.91 and the average family size was 3.18.

In the township the population was spread out, with 30.9% under the age of 18, 7.0% from 18 to 24, 24.6% from 25 to 44, 22.4% from 45 to 64, and 15.0% who were 65 years of age or older. The median age was 37 years. For every 100 females, there were 106.8 males. For every 100 females age 18 and over, there were 108.6 males.

The median income for a household in the township was $41,944, and the median income for a family was $42,969. Males had a median income of $30,855 versus $22,143 for females. The per capita income for the township was $14,655. About 9.1% of families and 13.2% of the population were below the poverty line, including 13.3% of those under age 18 and 7.3% of those age 65 or over.
