= Foster Township, Faribault County, Minnesota =

Township in Minnesota, United States

Foster Township
- Township
- Location within the state of Minnesota Foster Township (the United States)
- Coordinates: 43°37′50″N 93°42′20″W
- Country: United States
- State: Minnesota
- County: Faribault

Area
  - Total: 35.9 sq mi (92.9 km^{2})
  - Land: 35.4 sq mi (91.7 km^{2})
  - Water: 0.42 sq mi (1.1 km^{2})
- Elevation: 1,165 ft (355 m)

Population (2000)
  - Total: 314
  - Density: 8.8/sq mi (3.4/km^{2})
- Time zone: UTC-6 (Central (CST))
  - Summer (DST): UTC-5 (CDT)
- FIPS code: 27-22076
- GNIS feature ID: 0664206

Foster Township is a township in Faribault County, Minnesota, United States. The population was 314 at the 2000 census.

Foster Township was organized in 1864, and named for Dr. Reuben R. Foster, a pioneer settler.

== Geography ==
According to the United States Census Bureau, the township has a total area of 35.9 square miles (93 km^{2}), of which 35.4 square miles (92 km^{2}) is land and 0.4 square miles (1.0 km^{2}) (1.20%) is water.

== Demographics ==
As of the census of 2000, there were 314 people, 112 households, and 85 families residing in the township. The population density was 8.9 inhabitants per square mile (3.4/km^{2}). There were 119 housing units at an average density of 3.4 per square mile (1.3/km^{2}). The racial makeup of the township was 98.41% White, 0.32% African American, 0.32% Asian, and 0.96% from two or more races. Hispanic or Latino of any race were 1.91% of the population.

There were 112 households, out of which 35.7% had children under the age of 18 living with them, 74.1% were married couples living together, 1.8% had a female householder with no husband present, and 24.1% were non-families. 21.4% of all households were made up of individuals, and 10.7% had someone living alone who was 65 years of age or older. The average household size was 2.80 and the average family size was 3.34.

In the township the population was spread out, with 30.6% under the age of 18, 5.7% from 18 to 24, 24.8% from 25 to 44, 25.8% from 45 to 64, and 13.1% who were 65 years of age or older. The median age was 38 years. For every 100 females, there were 107.9 males. For every 100 females age 18 and over, there were 103.7 males.

The median income for a household in the township was $40,833, and the median income for a family was $48,125. Males had a median income of $27,500 versus $16,477 for females. The per capita income for the township was $16,224. About 3.0% of families and 3.8% of the population were below the poverty line, including none of those under age 18 and 14.7% of those age 65 or over.
