= Pilot Branch =

Stream in the American state of Missouri

Coordinates: 38.5875256°N 92.6638022°W

Pilot Branch (also called Pilot Creek) is a stream in Moniteau County in the U.S. state of Missouri. It is a tributary of Smith Creek.

Pilot Branch was named for a nearby tract of trees which stood as a point of navigation to pioneers.
