= Prescott Township, Faribault County, Minnesota =

Township in Minnesota, United States

Prescott Township
- Township
- Location within the state of Minnesota Prescott Township (the United States)
- Coordinates: 43°42′35″N 94°4′1″W
- Country: United States
- State: Minnesota
- County: Faribault

Area
  - Total: 36.1 sq mi (93.5 km^{2})
  - Land: 35.9 sq mi (93.1 km^{2})
  - Water: 0.19 sq mi (0.5 km^{2})
- Elevation: 1,109 ft (338 m)

Population (2000)
  - Total: 222
  - Density: 6.2/sq mi (2.4/km^{2})
- Time zone: UTC-6 (Central (CST))
  - Summer (DST): UTC-5 (CDT)
- FIPS code: 27-52432
- GNIS feature ID: 0665353

Prescott Township is a township in Faribault County, Minnesota, United States. The population was 222 at the 2000 census.

Prescott Township was organized in 1861, and named for a pioneer settler.

== Geography ==
According to the United States Census Bureau, the township has a total area of 36.1 square miles (93.5 km^{2}), of which 35.9 square miles (93.1 km^{2}) is land and 0.2 square mile (0.5 km^{2}) (0.50%) is water.

== Demographics ==
As of the census of 2000, there were 222 people, 82 households, and 66 families residing in the township. The population density was 6.2 people per square mile (2.4/km^{2}). There were 92 housing units at an average density of 2.6/sq mi (1.0/km^{2}). The racial makeup of the township was 99.10% White, 0.90% from other races. Hispanic or Latino of any race were 3.15% of the population.

There were 82 households, out of which 34.1% had children under the age of 18 living with them, 74.4% were married couples living together, and 19.5% were non-families. 19.5% of all households were made up of individuals, and 8.5% had someone living alone who was 65 years of age or older. The average household size was 2.71 and the average family size was 3.09.

In the township the population was spread out, with 30.6% under the age of 18, 2.7% from 18 to 24, 25.2% from 25 to 44, 23.4% from 45 to 64, and 18.0% who were 65 years of age or older. The median age was 40 years. For every 100 females, there were 111.4 males. For every 100 females age 18 and over, there were 116.9 males.

The median income for a household in the township was $48,571, and the median income for a family was $49,464. Males had a median income of $28,125 versus $23,750 for females. The per capita income for the township was $16,986. About 8.0% of families and 8.4% of the population were below the poverty line, including 6.2% of those under the age of eighteen and none of those 65 or over.
