= Barber Township, Faribault County, Minnesota =

Township in Minnesota, United States

Barber Township
- Township
- Location within the state of Minnesota Barber Township (the United States)
- Coordinates: 43°43′14″N 93°56′51″W
- Country: United States
- State: Minnesota
- County: Faribault

Area
  - Total: 36.0 sq mi (93.3 km^{2})
  - Land: 36.0 sq mi (93.3 km^{2})
  - Water: 0 sq mi (0.0 km^{2})
- Elevation: 1,099 ft (335 m)

Population (2000)
  - Total: 278
  - Density: 7.8/sq mi (3/km^{2})
- Time zone: UTC-6 (Central (CST))
  - Summer (DST): UTC-5 (CDT)
- FIPS code: 27-03520
- GNIS feature ID: 0663504

Barber Township is a township in Faribault County, Minnesota, United States. The population was 278 at the 2000 census.

== History ==
Barber Township was organized in 1864, and named for Chauncey Barber, a pioneer settler.

== Geography ==
According to the United States Census Bureau, the township has a total area of 36.0 square miles (93 km^{2}), all land.

== Demographics ==
As of the census of 2000, there were 278 people, 101 households, and 91 families residing in the township. The population density was 7.7 inhabitants per square mile (3.0/km^{2}). There were 106 housing units at an average density of 2.9 per square mile (1.1/km^{2}). The racial makeup of the township was 97.48% White, 0.36% Asian, 1.80% from other races, and 0.36% from two or more races. Hispanic or Latino of any race were 1.80% of the population.

There were 101 households, out of which 32.7% had children under the age of 18 living with them, 86.1% were married couples living together, 3.0% had a female householder with no husband present, and 9.9% were non-families. 8.9% of all households were made up of individuals, and 6.9% had someone living alone who was 65 years of age or older. The average household size was 2.75 and the average family size was 2.91.

In the township the population was spread out, with 26.6% under the age of 18, 2.9% from 18 to 24, 23.7% from 25 to 44, 29.1% from 45 to 64, and 17.6% who were 65 years of age or older. The median age was 43 years. For every 100 females, there were 94.4 males. For every 100 females age 18 and over, there were 104.0 males.

The median income for a household in the township was $37,500, and the median income for a family was $37,813. Males had a median income of $25,000 versus $19,167 for females. The per capita income for the township was $14,399. None of the families and 0.7% of the population were living below the poverty line, including no under eighteens and 3.8% of those over 64.
