= Walnut Lake Township, Faribault County, Minnesota =

Township in Minnesota, United States

Walnut Lake Township
- Township
- Location within the state of Minnesota Walnut Lake Township (the United States)
- Coordinates: 43°42′36″N 93°50′7″W
- Country: United States
- State: Minnesota
- County: Faribault

Area
  - Total: 35.9 sq mi (93.0 km^{2})
  - Land: 34.9 sq mi (90.4 km^{2})
  - Water: 1.0 sq mi (2.6 km^{2})
- Elevation: 1,112 ft (339 m)

Population (2000)
  - Total: 251
  - Density: 7.3/sq mi (2.8/km^{2})
- Time zone: UTC-6 (Central (CST))
  - Summer (DST): UTC-5 (CDT)
- FIPS code: 27-67864
- GNIS feature ID: 0665903

Walnut Lake Township is a township in Faribault County, Minnesota, United States. The population was 251 at the 2000 census.

Walnut Lake Township was organized in 1861, and named after a former lake where white walnut trees grew.

== History ==
Ghost Town: Walnut Lake, Faribault County WALNUT LAKE Township, settled in June 1856, organized in 1861, bears the name of its large lake, referring to its butternut trees, also called oil-nut and white walnut. It is translated from the Dakota name Tazuka. The village of Walnut Lake, section 27, on the northwest side of Walnut Lake, flourished with hotels, a post office, a school, several stores, dwellings, and a blacksmith shop. Its first post office operated 1860–69, when it was transferred to Wells; a second post office operated 1870–82. The village was a popular stage stop for persons hunting lands to the west.

== Geography ==
According to the United States Census Bureau, the township has a total area of 35.9 square miles (93.0 km^{2}), of which 34.9 square miles (90.4 km^{2}) is land and 1.0 square mile (2.6 km^{2}) (2.81%) is water.

== Demographics ==
As of the census of 2000, there were 251 people, 92 households, and 65 families residing in the township. The population density was 7.2 people per square mile (2.8/km^{2}). There were 102 housing units at an average density of 2.9/sq mi (1.1/km^{2}). The racial makeup of the township was 98.80% White, 0.40% from other races, and 0.80% from two or more races. Hispanic or Latino of any race were 1.20% of the population.

There were 92 households, out of which 30.4% had children under the age of 18 living with them, 67.4% were married couples living together, 2.2% had a female householder with no husband present, and 28.3% were non-families. 27.2% of all households were made up of individuals, and 14.1% had someone living alone who was 65 years of age or older. The average household size was 2.73 and the average family size was 3.36.

In the township the population was spread out, with 27.9% under the age of 18, 8.4% from 18 to 24, 23.5% from 25 to 44, 26.3% from 45 to 64, and 13.9% who were 65 years of age or older. The median age was 38 years. For every 100 females, there were 118.3 males. For every 100 females age 18 and over, there were 132.1 males.

The median income for a household in the township was $39,375, and the median income for a family was $48,125. Males had a median income of $27,321 versus $23,958 for females. The per capita income for the township was $16,632. About 1.5% of families and 5.8% of the population were below the poverty line, including 5.9% of those under the age of eighteen and 4.9% of those 65 or over.
