= Delavan, Minnesota =

City in Minnesota, United States

Delavan
- City
- Location of Delavan, Minnesota
- Coordinates: 43°46′04″N 94°01′03″W
- Country: United States
- State: Minnesota
- County: Faribault

Government
  - Type: Mayor - Council
  - Mayor: Dan Haugh

Area
  - Total: 1.00 sq mi (2.60 km^{2})
  - Land: 1.00 sq mi (2.60 km^{2})
  - Water: 0 sq mi (0.00 km^{2})
- Elevation: 1,066 ft (325 m)

Population (2020)
  - Total: 172
  - Density: 171.1/sq mi (66.05/km^{2})
- Time zone: UTC-6 (Central (CST))
  - Summer (DST): UTC-5 (CDT)
- ZIP code: 56023
- Area code: 507
- FIPS code: 27-15472
- GNIS feature ID: 2394497

Delavan (/ˈdɛləvən/ DEL-ə-vən) is a city in Faribault County, Minnesota, United States. As of the 2020 census, Delavan had a population of 172.

== History ==
Delavan was platted in 1870 when the railroad was extended to that point and named for Oren Delavan Brown, a railroad official. A post office was established as Delavan Station in 1870, and the name of the post office was changed to Delavan in 1885. Delavan was incorporated in 1877.

== Geography ==
According to the United States Census Bureau, the city has a total area of 1.06 square miles (2.75 km^{2}), all land.

Minnesota State Highway 109 and County Highway 13 are two of the main routes in the community.

== Demographics ==
Historical population
Census	Pop.	Note	%±
1880	251		—
1890	252		0.4%
1900	321		27.4%
1910	284		−11.5%
1920	318		12.0%
1930	299		−6.0%
1940	321		7.4%
1950	302		−5.9%
1960	322		6.6%
1970	281		−12.7%
1980	262		−6.8%
1990	245		−6.5%
2000	223		−9.0%
2010	179		−19.7%
2020	172		−3.9%
U.S. Decennial Census

=== 2010 census ===
As of the census of 2010, 179 people, 86 households, and 54 families residing in the city. The population density was 168.9 inhabitants per square mile (65.2/km^{2}). There were 104 housing units at an average density of 98.1 per square mile (37.9/km^{2}). The city's racial makeup was 96.6% White, 0.6% from other races, and 2.8% from two or more races. Hispanic or Latino of any race were 1.1% of the population.

There were 86 households, of which 22.1% had children under the age of 18 living with them, 47.7% were married couples living together, 10.5% had a female householder with no husband present, 4.7% had a male householder with no wife present, and 37.2% were non-families. 31.4% of all households comprised individuals, and 15.1% had someone who was 65 or older living alone. The average household size was 2.08, and the average family size was 2.56.

The median age in the city was 53.1 years. 19.6% of residents were under 18; 6.2% were between 18 and 24; 16.8% were from 25 to 44; 32.4% were from 45 to 64; and 25.1% were 65 or older. The gender makeup of the city was 52.5% male and 47.5% female.

=== 2000 census ===
As of the census of 2000, 223 people, 100 households, and 71 families residing in the city. The population density was 209.9 inhabitants per square mile (81.0/km^{2}). There were 108 housing units at an average density of 101.7 per square mile (39.3/km^{2}). The city's racial makeup was 99.55% White and 0.45% African American. Hispanic or Latino of any race were 0.45% of the population.

There were 100 households, of which 23.0% had children under 18 living with them, 64.0% were married couples living together, 4.0% had a female householder with no husband present, and 29.0% were non-families. 26.0% of all households comprised individuals, and 19.0% had someone who was 65 or older living alone. The average household size was 2.23 and the average family size was 2.65.

The population was spread out in the city, with 17.0% under 18, 7.2% from 18 to 24, 23.3% from 25 to 44, 23.8% from 45 to 64, and 28.7% who were 65 or older. The median age was 47 years. For every 100 females, there were 104.6 males. For every 100 females aged 18 and over, there were 105.6 males.

The median income for a household in the city was $38,125, and the median income for a family was $40,000. Males had a median income of $29,375 versus $17,083 for females. The per capita income for the city was $18,144. About 2.9% of families and 4.7% of the population were below the poverty line, including none of those under eighteen and 10.3% of those 65 or over.

== Notable people ==
- Pat Piper, Minnesota state legislator, was born in Delavan.
- Harland G. Wood (1907–1991), biochemist, was born in Delavan.
