= Dunbar Township, Faribault County, Minnesota =

Township in Minnesota, United States

Dunbar Township
- Township
- Location within the state of Minnesota Dunbar Township (the United States)
- Coordinates: 43°47′55″N 93°43′6″W
- Country: United States
- State: Minnesota
- County: Faribault

Area
  - Total: 35.9 sq mi (93.0 km^{2})
  - Land: 35.9 sq mi (93.0 km^{2})
  - Water: 0 sq mi (0.0 km^{2})
- Elevation: 1,129 ft (344 m)

Population (2000)
  - Total: 312
  - Density: 8.8/sq mi (3.4/km^{2})
- Time zone: UTC-6 (Central (CST))
  - Summer (DST): UTC-5 (CDT)
- FIPS code: 27-17108
- GNIS feature ID: 0664008

Dunbar Township is a township in Faribault County, Minnesota, United States. The population was 312 at the 2000 census.

Dunbar Township was organized in 1856, and named for William F. Dunbar, a state auditor.

== Geography ==
According to the United States Census Bureau, the township has a total area of 35.9 square miles (93 km^{2}), all land.

== Demographics ==
As of the census of 2000, there were 312 people, 118 households, and 86 families residing in the township. The population density was 8.7 inhabitants per square mile (3.4/km^{2}). There were 124 housing units at an average density of 3.5 per square mile (1.4/km^{2}). The racial makeup of the township was 98.72% White, 0.32% Asian, and 0.96% from two or more races. Hispanic or Latino of any race were 0.64% of the population.

There were 118 households, out of which 35.6% had children under the age of 18 living with them, 67.8% were married couples living together, 3.4% had a female householder with no husband present, and 27.1% were non-families. 22.9% of all households were made up of individuals, and 10.2% had someone living alone who was 65 years of age or older. The average household size was 2.64 and the average family size was 3.17.

In the township the population was spread out, with 27.2% under the age of 18, 6.7% from 18 to 24, 24.4% from 25 to 44, 26.0% from 45 to 64, and 15.7% who were 65 years of age or older. The median age was 41 years. For every 100 females, there were 109.4 males. For every 100 females age 18 and over, there were 118.3 males.

The median income for a household in the township was $46,563, and the median income for a family was $48,542. Males had a median income of $32,143 versus $19,583 for females. The per capita income for the township was $20,805. About 7.9% of families and 5.3% of the population were below the poverty line, including 6.3% of those under age 18 and none of those age 65 or over.
