= Bricelyn, Minnesota =

City in Minnesota, United States

Bricelyn
- City
- Motto: "A Good Place To Call Home"
- Location of Bricelyn, Minnesota
- Coordinates: 43°33′39″N 93°48′47″W
- Country: United States
- State: Minnesota
- County: Faribault

Government
  - Type: Mayor - Council
  - Mayor: Thomas Sens

Area
  - Total: 0.29 sq mi (0.75 km^{2})
  - Land: 0.29 sq mi (0.75 km^{2})
  - Water: 0 sq mi (0.00 km^{2})
- Elevation: 1,181 ft (360 m)

Population (2020)
  - Total: 348
  - Density: 1,198.1/sq mi (462.59/km^{2})
- Time zone: UTC-6 (Central (CST))
  - Summer (DST): UTC-5 (CDT)
- ZIP code: 56014
- Area code: 507
- FIPS code: 27-07678
- GNIS feature ID: 2393414
- Website: www.co.faribault.mn.us/welcome-bricelyn-minnesota

Bricelyn is a city in Faribault County, Minnesota, United States. As of the 2020 census, Bricelyn had a population of 348.

== History ==
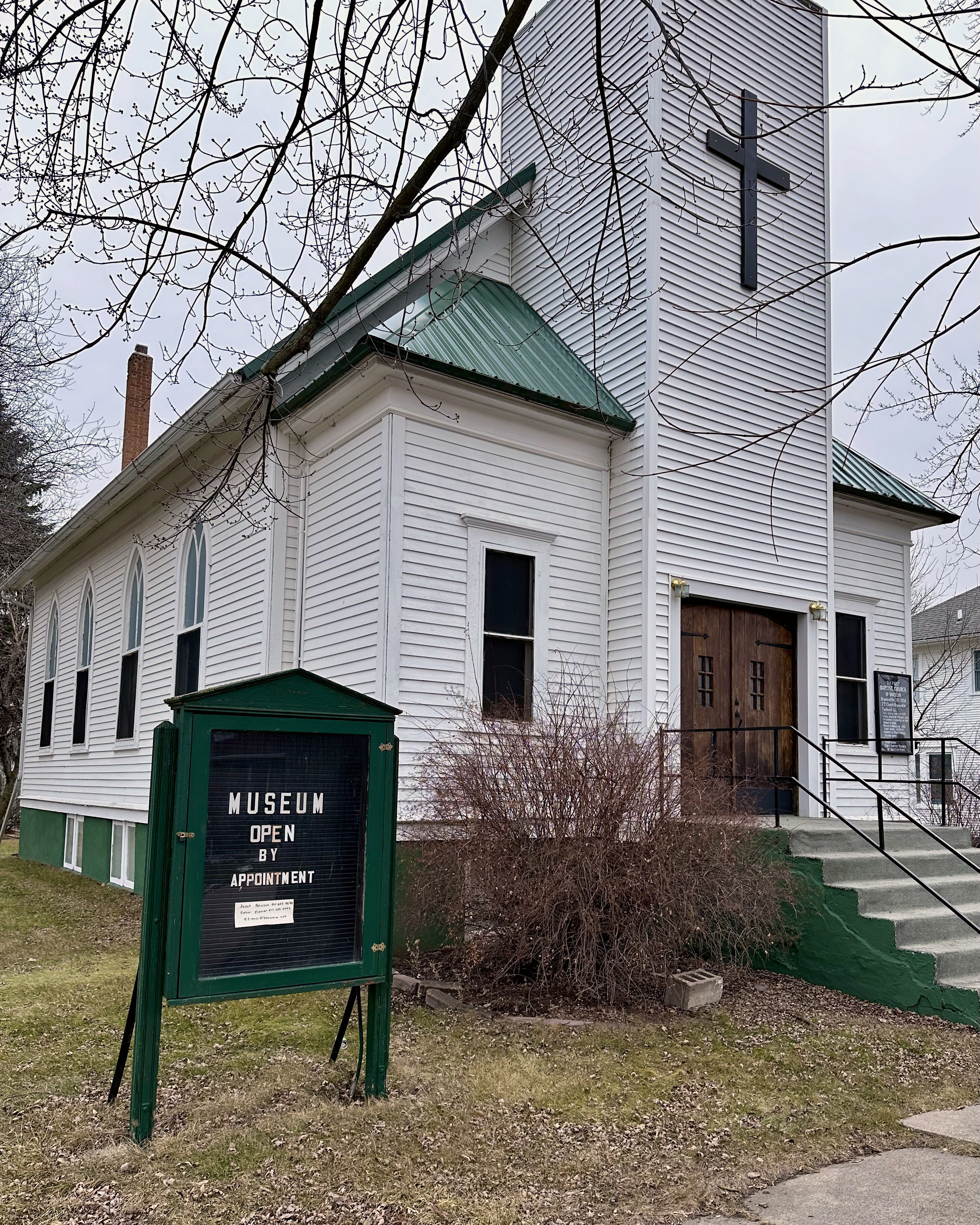
Bricelyn Museum former 1st Baptist Church

The town developed as a result of the railroad passing through the area. In 1899, town lots were auctioned. The city was named for John Brice, the original owner of the town site. A post office has been in operation at Bricelyn since 1899.

== Geography ==
According to the United States Census Bureau, the city has a total area of 0.29 square miles (0.75 km^{2}), all land.

== Demographics ==
Historical population
Census	Pop.	Note	%±
1900	166		—
1910	352		112.0%
1920	564		60.2%
1930	509		−9.8%
1940	601		18.1%
1950	639		6.3%
1960	542		−15.2%
1970	470		−13.3%
1980	487		3.6%
1990	426		−12.5%
2000	379		−11.0%
2010	365		−3.7%
2020	348		−4.7%
U.S. Decennial Census

=== 2010 census ===
As of the census of 2010, there were 365 people, 168 households, and 97 families living in the city. The population density was 1,258.6 inhabitants per square mile (485.9/km^{2}). There were 197 housing units at an average density of 679.3 per square mile (262.3/km^{2}). The racial makeup of the city was 92.6% White, 2.5% African American, 1.4% Native American, 0.8% Asian, 0.5% from other races, and 2.2% from two or more races. Hispanic or Latino of any race were 9.6% of the population.

There were 168 households, of which 21.4% had children under the age of 18 living with them, 44.6% were married couples living together, 8.9% had a female householder with no husband present, 4.2% had a male householder with no wife present, and 42.3% were non-families. 38.7% of all households were made up of individuals, and 16.7% had someone living alone who was 65 years of age or older. The average household size was 2.17 and the average family size was 2.89.

The median age in the city was 47.9 years. 22.5% of residents were under the age of 18; 6.5% were between the ages of 18 and 24; 18.6% were from 25 to 44; 27.4% were from 45 to 64; and 24.9% were 65 years of age or older. The gender makeup of the city was 52.1% male and 47.9% female.

=== 2000 census ===
As of the census of 2000, there were 379 people, 182 households, and 101 families living in the city. The population density was 1,283.9 inhabitants per square mile (495.7/km^{2}). There were 208 housing units at an average density of 704.6 per square mile (272.0/km^{2}). The racial makeup of the city was 99.47% White, 0.26% from other races, and 0.26% from two or more races. Hispanic or Latino of any race were 3.96% of the population.

There were 182 households, out of which 21.4% had children under the age of 18 living with them, 49.5% were married couples living together, 2.2% had a female householder with no husband present, and 44.0% were non-families. 39.6% of all households were made up of individuals, and 20.3% had someone living alone who was 65 years of age or older. The average household size was 2.08 and the average family size was 2.80.

In the city, the population was spread out, with 20.8% under the age of 18, 5.8% from 18 to 24, 22.4% from 25 to 44, 23.7% from 45 to 64, and 27.2% who were 65 years of age or older. The median age was 46 years. For every 100 females, there were 102.7 males. For every 100 females age 18 and over, there were 106.9 males.

The median income for a household in the city was $29,375, and the median income for a family was $39,375. Males had a median income of $31,354 versus $21,111 for females. The per capita income for the city was $15,340. About 7.5% of families and 10.2% of the population were below the poverty line, including 7.5% of those under age 18 and 10.5% of those age 65 or over.
