= Seely Township, Faribault County, Minnesota =

Township in Minnesota, United States

Seely Township
- Township
- Location within the state of Minnesota Seely Township (the United States)
- Coordinates: 43°33′2″N 93°50′21″W
- Country: United States
- State: Minnesota
- County: Faribault

Area
  - Total: 36.1 sq mi (93.4 km^{2})
  - Land: 36.1 sq mi (93.4 km^{2})
  - Water: 0 sq mi (0.0 km^{2})
- Elevation: 1,180 ft (360 m)

Population (2000)
  - Total: 210
  - Density: 5.7/sq mi (2.2/km^{2})
- Time zone: UTC-6 (Central (CST))
  - Summer (DST): UTC-5 (CDT)
- FIPS code: 27-59206
- GNIS feature ID: 0665575

Seely Township is a township in Faribault County, Minnesota, United States. The population was 210 at the 2000 census.

Seely Township was organized in 1858, and named for Philander C. Seely, a pioneer settler.

== Geography ==
According to the United States Census Bureau, the township has a total area of 36.0 square miles (93.4 km^{2}), all land.

== Demographics ==
As of the census of 2000, there were 210 people, 84 households, and 63 families residing in the township. The population density was 5.8 people per square mile (2.2/km^{2}). There were 92 housing units at an average density of 2.6/sq mi (1.0/km^{2}). The racial makeup of the township was 94.29% White, 2.38% African American, 0.48% Asian, 0.48% from other races, and 2.38% from two or more races. Hispanic or Latino of any race were 1.43% of the population.

There were 84 households, out of which 23.8% had children under the age of 18 living with them, 69.0% were married couples living together, 6.0% had a female householder with no husband present, and 25.0% were non-families. 25.0% of all households were made up of individuals, and 10.7% had someone living alone who was 65 years of age or older. The average household size was 2.50 and the average family size was 2.98.

In the township the population was spread out, with 24.3% under the age of 18, 4.3% from 18 to 24, 18.1% from 25 to 44, 31.0% from 45 to 64, and 22.4% who were 65 years of age or older. The median age was 47 years. For every 100 females, there were 101.9 males. For every 100 females age 18 and over, there were 103.8 males.

The median income for a household in the township was $31,250, and the median income for a family was $36,500. Males had a median income of $20,750 versus $38,750 for females. The per capita income for the township was $19,555. None of the families and 1.1% of the population were living below the poverty line.
