= Emerald Township, Faribault County, Minnesota =

Township in Minnesota, United States

Emerald Township
- Township
- Location within the state of Minnesota Emerald Township (the United States)
- Coordinates: 43°38′34″N 93°56′52″W
- Country: United States
- State: Minnesota
- County: Faribault

Area
  - Total: 35.8 sq mi (92.7 km^{2})
  - Land: 35.8 sq mi (92.7 km^{2})
  - Water: 0 sq mi (0.0 km^{2})
- Elevation: 1,112 ft (339 m)

Population (2000)
  - Total: 228
  - Density: 6.5/sq mi (2.5/km^{2})
- Time zone: UTC-6 (Central (CST))
  - Summer (DST): UTC-5 (CDT)
- FIPS code: 27-19268
- GNIS feature ID: 0664095

Emerald Township is a township in Faribault County, Minnesota, United States. The population was 228 at the 2000 census.

== History ==
Emerald Township was organized in 1866, and named for the Emerald Isle, the poetic name for Ireland.

== Geography ==
According to the United States Census Bureau, the township has a total area of 35.8 square miles (93 km^{2}), all land.

== Demographics ==
As of the census of 2000, there were 228 people, 89 households, and 63 families residing in the township. The population density was 6.4 inhabitants per square mile (2.5/km^{2}). There were 98 housing units at an average density of 2.7 per square mile (1.0/km^{2}). The racial makeup of the township was 97.81% White, 0.44% Native American, 0.88% from other races, and 0.88% from two or more races. Hispanic or Latino of any race were 1.75% of the population.

There were 89 households, out of which 32.6% had children under the age of 18 living with them, 66.3% were married couples living together, 1.1% had a female householder with no husband present, and 28.1% were non-families. 25.8% of all households were made up of individuals, and 10.1% had someone living alone who was 65 years of age or older. The average household size was 2.56 and the average family size was 3.09.

In the township the population was spread out, with 26.8% under the age of 18, 7.0% from 18 to 24, 26.8% from 25 to 44, 27.2% from 45 to 64, and 12.3% who were 65 years of age or older. The median age was 39 years. For every 100 females, there were 140.0 males. For every 100 females age 18 and over, there were 116.9 males.

The median income for a household in the township was $41,806, and the median income for a family was $49,750. Males had a median income of $29,063 versus $23,750 for females. The per capita income for the township was $18,127. About 5.6% of families and 7.2% of the population were below the poverty line, including 15.7% of those under the age of eighteen and none of those 65 or over.
