= Winnebago, Minnesota =

City in Minnesota, United States

Winnebago
- City
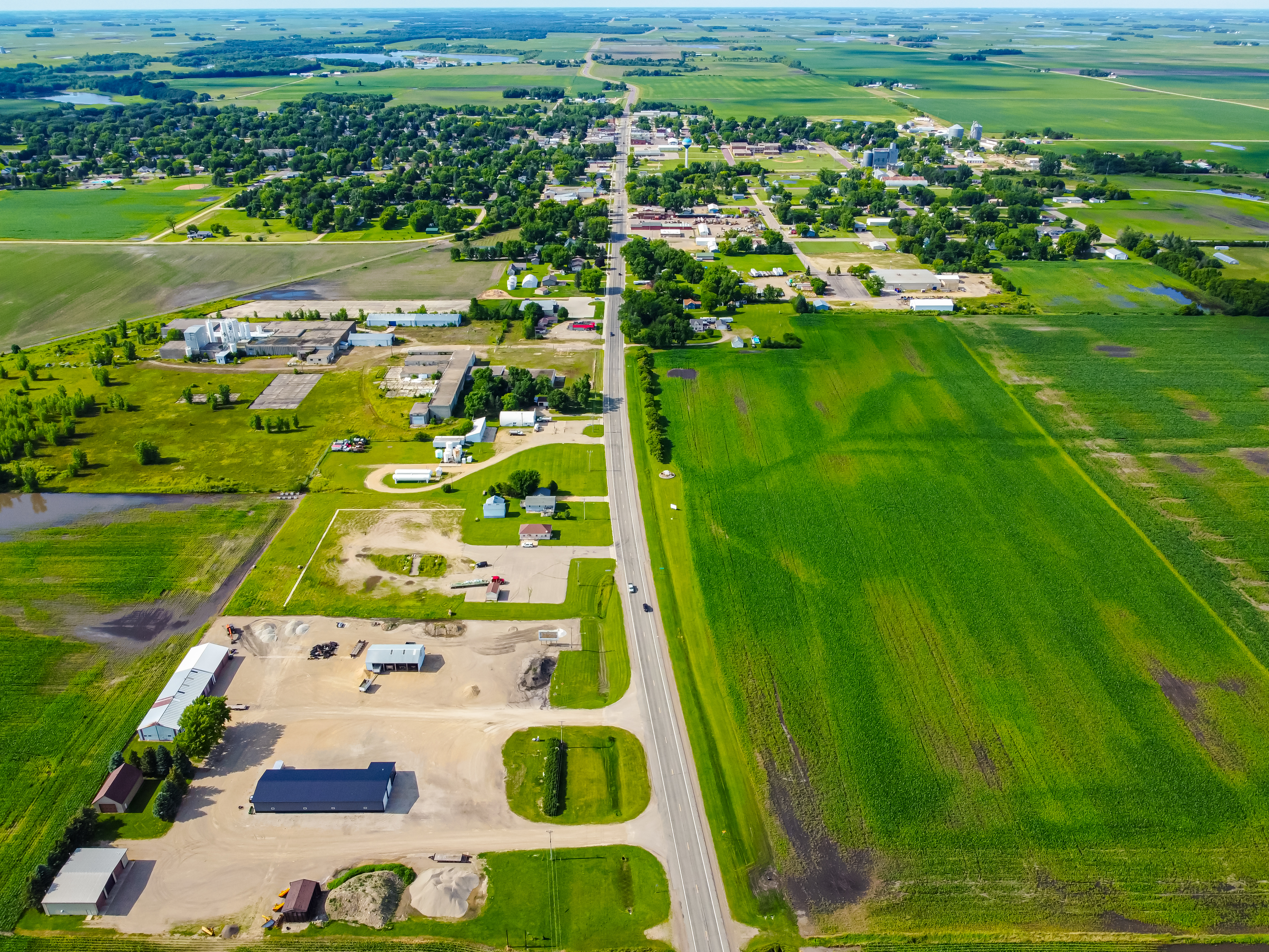
- US-169 runs through town
- Motto: Small Town, Big Heart!
- Location of Winnebago, Minnesota
- Coordinates: 43°45′52″N 94°10′12″W
- Country: United States
- State: Minnesota
- County: Faribault
- Settled: June 1855
- Organized: October 1858
- Platted: January 1857
- Incorporated: February 19, 1857

Government
  - Mayor: Jean Anderson

Area
  - Total: 2.36 sq mi (6.11 km^{2})
  - Land: 2.35 sq mi (6.08 km^{2})
  - Water: 0.012 sq mi (0.03 km^{2})
- Elevation: 1,106 ft (337 m)

Population (2020)
  - Total: 1,391
  - Estimate (2022): 1,391
  - Density: 592.5/sq mi (228.76/km^{2})
- Time zone: UTC−6 (Central (CST))
  - Summer (DST): UTC−5 (CDT)
- ZIP Code: 56098
- Area code: 507
- FIPS code: 27-70924
- GNIS feature ID: 2397347
- Sales tax: 6.875%
- Website: cityofwinnebago.com

Winnebago is a city in Faribault County, Minnesota, United States. The population was 1,391 at the 2020 census.

== History ==
Winnebago was originally called Winnebago City, and under the latter name was laid out in 1856. The city was named after the Winnebago Indians, who had recently been moved to a reservation nearby from a location further north near Long Prairie. A post office was established as Winnebago City in 1857, and "city" was dropped from the name in 1905.

The first rail service came to Winnebago in 1871, when the Southern Minnesota Railroad completed its line to the town. Winnebago was the western terminus of the line until 1878, when it was extended to the west, reaching the state border at Airlie in 1880. That same year, the Southern Minnesota Railroad was absorbed into the Chicago, Milwaukee, St. Paul and Pacific Railroad (CMStP&P), more commonly known as the Milwaukee Road.

== Geography ==
According to the United States Census Bureau, the city has a total area of 2.27 square miles (5.88 km^{2}), all land.

U.S. Route 169 and Minnesota State Highway 109 are two of the main routes in the city.

Winnebago is nine miles north of Interstate 90, exit 119, and approximately 28 miles south of Mankato.

=== Climate ===
Climate data for Winnebago, Minnesota, 1991–2020 normals, extremes 1898–present
Month	Jan	Feb	Mar	Apr	May	Jun	Jul	Aug	Sep	Oct	Nov	Dec	Year
Record high °F (°C)	63 (17)	70 (21)	85 (29)	95 (35)	106 (41)	104 (40)	107 (42)	106 (41)	100 (38)	93 (34)	82 (28)	67 (19)	107 (42)
Mean maximum °F (°C)	42.8 (6.0)	47.3 (8.5)	65.8 (18.8)	80.8 (27.1)	89.1 (31.7)	92.7 (33.7)	92.2 (33.4)	90.5 (32.5)	88.9 (31.6)	82.6 (28.1)	65.9 (18.8)	47.2 (8.4)	95.1 (35.1)
Mean daily maximum °F (°C)	23.2 (−4.9)	27.8 (−2.3)	40.4 (4.7)	56.1 (13.4)	68.8 (20.4)	78.8 (26.0)	82.2 (27.9)	79.7 (26.5)	73.7 (23.2)	59.9 (15.5)	42.7 (5.9)	28.7 (−1.8)	55.2 (12.9)
Daily mean °F (°C)	14.4 (−9.8)	19.0 (−7.2)	31.8 (−0.1)	45.9 (7.7)	58.5 (14.7)	68.9 (20.5)	72.3 (22.4)	69.8 (21.0)	62.6 (17.0)	48.9 (9.4)	33.9 (1.1)	20.7 (−6.3)	45.6 (7.5)
Mean daily minimum °F (°C)	5.6 (−14.7)	10.3 (−12.1)	23.3 (−4.8)	35.7 (2.1)	48.2 (9.0)	59.0 (15.0)	62.4 (16.9)	59.9 (15.5)	51.4 (10.8)	37.9 (3.3)	25.0 (−3.9)	12.6 (−10.8)	35.9 (2.2)
Mean minimum °F (°C)	−16.0 (−26.7)	−11.1 (−23.9)	0.0 (−17.8)	20.5 (−6.4)	34.1 (1.2)	47.0 (8.3)	52.3 (11.3)	49.7 (9.8)	35.6 (2.0)	22.2 (−5.4)	6.3 (−14.3)	−9.4 (−23.0)	−19.2 (−28.4)
Record low °F (°C)	−35 (−37)	−32 (−36)	−25 (−32)	0 (−18)	20 (−7)	31 (−1)	44 (7)	36 (2)	22 (−6)	0 (−18)	−13 (−25)	−30 (−34)	−35 (−37)
Average precipitation inches (mm)	0.90 (23)	1.03 (26)	1.88 (48)	3.48 (88)	4.51 (115)	5.05 (128)	4.18 (106)	3.94 (100)	3.47 (88)	2.67 (68)	1.64 (42)	1.24 (31)	33.99 (863)
Average snowfall inches (cm)	10.4 (26)	9.1 (23)	7.3 (19)	4.1 (10)	0.0 (0.0)	0.0 (0.0)	0.0 (0.0)	0.0 (0.0)	0.0 (0.0)	0.4 (1.0)	5.4 (14)	10.5 (27)	47.2 (120)
Average extreme snow depth inches (cm)	10.0 (25)	11.0 (28)	8.9 (23)	2.2 (5.6)	0.0 (0.0)	0.0 (0.0)	0.0 (0.0)	0.0 (0.0)	0.0 (0.0)	0.2 (0.51)	3.7 (9.4)	7.6 (19)	15.0 (38)
Average precipitation days (≥ 0.01 in)	7.6	6.6	8.3	10.7	12.8	12.1	9.4	9.4	8.6	8.6	6.5	8.0	108.6
Average snowy days (≥ 0.1 in)	5.5	5.1	3.0	1.2	0.0	0.0	0.0	0.0	0.0	0.4	2.7	5.4	23.3
Source 1: NOAA
Source 2: National Weather Service

== Demographics ==
Historical population
Census	Pop.	Note	%±
1860	48		—
1870	326		579.2%
1880	993		204.6%
1890	1,108		11.6%
1900	1,816		63.9%
1910	1,554		−14.4%
1920	1,641		5.6%
1930	1,701		3.7%
1940	1,992		17.1%
1950	2,127		6.8%
1960	2,088		−1.8%
1970	1,791		−14.2%
1980	1,869		4.4%
1990	1,565		−16.3%
2000	1,487		−5.0%
2010	1,437		−3.4%
2020	1,391		−3.2%
2022 (est.)	1,391		0.0%
U.S. Decennial Census; 2020 Census

=== 2010 census ===
As of the census of 2010, there were 1,437 people, 609 households, and 379 families living in the city. The population density was 633.0 inhabitants per square mile (244.4/km^{2}). There were 688 housing units at an average density of 303.1 per square mile (117.0/km^{2}). The racial makeup of the city was 95.5% White, 0.1% African American, 0.6% Native American, 0.1% Asian, 2.6% from other races, and 1.0% from two or more races. Hispanic or Latino of any race were 7.5% of the population.

There were 609 households, of which 27.4% had children under the age of 18 living with them, 48.1% were married couples living together, 9.5% had a female householder with no husband present, 4.6% had a male householder with no wife present, and 37.8% were non-families. 34.3% of all households were made up of individuals, and 16.9% had someone living alone who was 65 years of age or older. The average household size was 2.28 and the average family size was 2.88.

The median age in the city was 42.3 years. 23.3% of residents were under the age of 18; 6.7% were between the ages of 18 and 24; 23.3% were from 25 to 44; 24.5% were from 45 to 64; and 22.1% were 65 years of age or older. The gender makeup of the city was 48.0% male and 52.0% female.

=== 2000 census ===
As of the census of 2000, there were 1,487 people, 641 households and 398 families living in the city. The population density was 675.5 inhabitants per square mile (260.8/km^{2}). There were 705 housing units at an average density of 320.3 per square mile (123.7/km^{2}). The racial makeup of the city was 96.30% White, 0.47% Native American, 0.67% Asian, 1.75% from other races, and 0.81% from two or more races. Hispanic or Latino of any race were 6.66% of the population.

There were 641 households of which 25.4% had children under the age of 18 living with them, 52.4% were married couples living together, 7.5% had a female householder with no husband present, and 37.9% were non-families. 34.2% of all households were made up of individuals, and 20.0% had someone living alone who was 65 years of age or older. The average household size was 2.21 and the average family size was 2.83.

21.0% under of the population were the age of 18, 7.5% from 18 to 24, 22.8% from 25 to 44, 21.3% from 45 to 64, and 27.3% who were 65 years of age or older. The median age was 44 years. For every 100 females, there were 91.9 males. For every 100 females age 18 and over, there were 87.5 males.

The median household income was $32,321 and the median family income was $41,420. Males had a median income of $30,375 versus $20,256 for females. The per capita income for the city was $16,435. About 4.6% of families and 9.5% of the population were below the poverty line, including 11.4% of those under age 18 and 13.3% of those age 65 or over.

== Notable people ==
- Harry Chozen - Major League baseball player
- John E. Grotberg - U.S. Representative from Illinois
- Margaret Hurley - Washington State legislator
- William Knight - lawyer and newspaper publisher; father of Phil Knight, founder of Nike Inc.
- Allen Walker Read - linguist and etymologist
- Harry E. Siman - Nebraska State Senator

== Politics ==
Winnebago is located in Minnesota's 1st Congressional District. Winnebago is located in Minnesota State Senate District 24, represented by Julie Rosen, and Minnesota House District 24A, represented by Bob Gunther.
