= Faribault County, Minnesota =

County in Minnesota, United States

- County
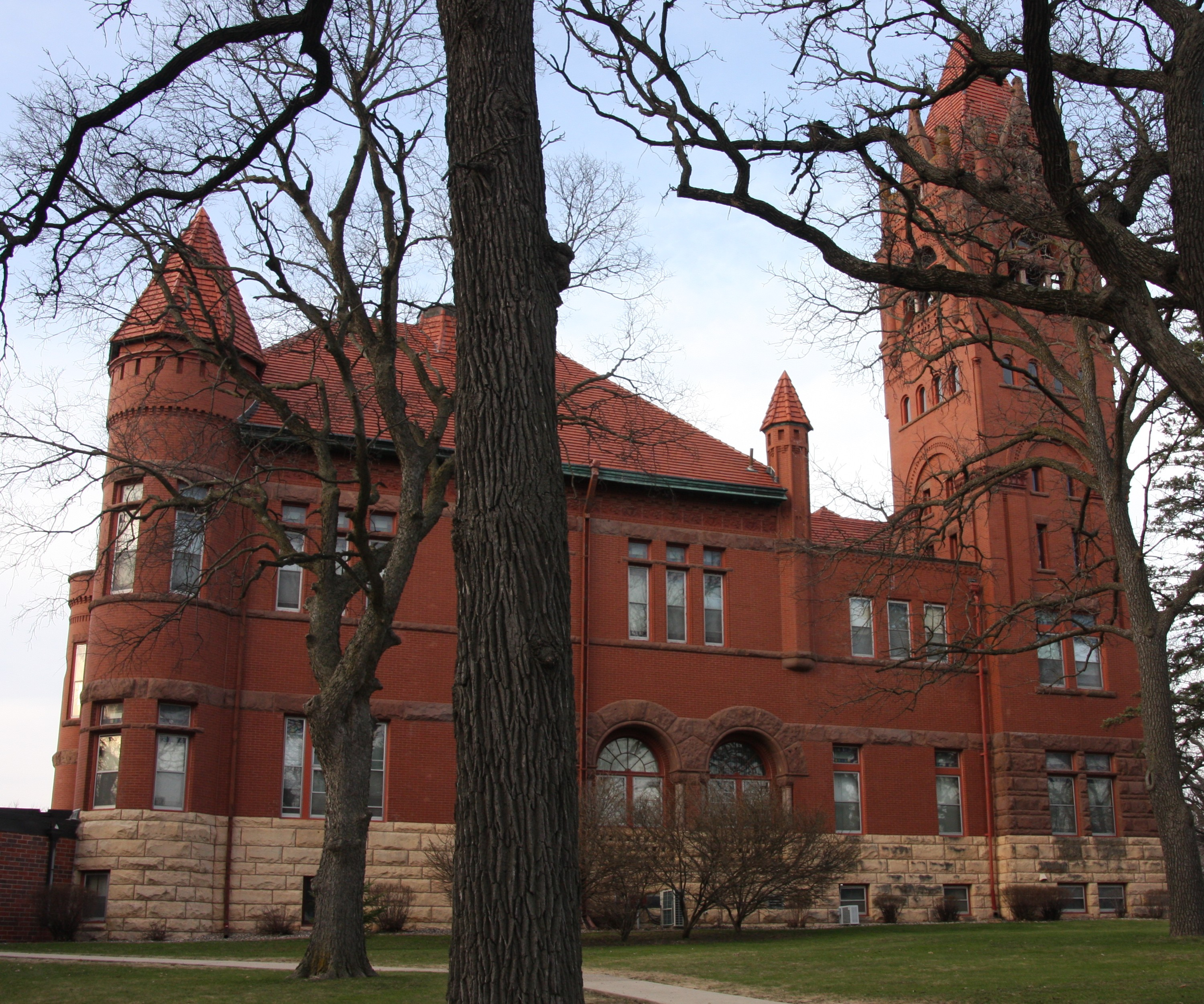
- Faribault County Courthouse in Blue Earth

- Location within the U.S. state of Minnesota
- Coordinates: 43°41′N 93°57′W
- Country: United States
- State: Minnesota
- Founded: February 20, 1855
- Named for: Jean Baptiste Faribault
- Seat: Blue Earth
- Largest city: Blue Earth

Area
  - Total: 722 sq mi (1,870 km^{2})
  - Land: 712 sq mi (1,840 km^{2})
  - Water: 9.4 sq mi (24 km^{2}) 1.3%

Population (2020)
  - Total: 13,921
  - Estimate (2025): 13,888 ▼
  - Density: 19.6/sq mi (7.55/km^{2})
- Time zone: UTC−6 (Central)
  - Summer (DST): UTC−5 (CDT)
- Congressional district: 1st
- Website: www.co.faribault.mn.us

Faribault County (/ˈfɛərboʊ/ FAIR-boh) is a county in the U.S. state of Minnesota. As of the 2020 census, the population was 13,921. Its county seat is Blue Earth.

== History ==
The county was founded in 1855. It was named for Jean-Baptiste Faribault, a settler and French fur trader among the Sioux Indians.

== Geography ==
Faribault County lies on the south side of Minnesota. Its southern border abuts the north border of the state of Iowa. The Blue Earth River flows northerly through the west-central part of the county; it enters from Iowa as two branches, West Branch and Middle Branch, merging at 5 miles (8.0 km) into the county. It is joined by East Branch near the city of Blue Earth, thence flows northward into Blue Earth County. The Maple River flows west-northwestward through the upper central part of the county, entering from Freeborn County and exiting to Blue Earth County. The Cobb River also flows through the NE part of the county, from Freeborn to Blue Earth county.

The county terrain consists of semi-arid rolling hills, devoted to agriculture. The SE portion is a glacial moraine near Kiester, and is known as the Kiester Moraine. The county has an area of 722 sq mi (1,870 km^{2}), of which 712 sq mi (1,840 km^{2}) is land and 9.4 sq mi (24 km^{2}) (1.3%) is water.

=== Lakes ===
- Bass Lake (Delavan Twp)
- Hart Lake
- Minnesota Lake
- Rice Lake (Delavan Twp)
- Rice Lake (Foster Twp)
- South Walnut Lake
- Walnut Lake

=== Airports ===
- Blue Earth Municipal Airport
- Wells Municipal Airport

=== Major highways ===
- Interstate 90
- U.S. Highway 169
- Minnesota State Highway 22
- Minnesota State Highway 109

Soils of Faribault County

=== Adjacent counties ===
- Blue Earth County - north
- Waseca County - northeast
- Freeborn County - east
- Winnebago County, Iowa - southeast
- Kossuth County, Iowa - southwest
- Martin County - west

=== Protected areas ===
- Walnut Lake State Wildlife Management Area

== Demographics ==
Historical population
Census	Pop.	Note	%±
1860	1,335		—
1870	9,940		644.6%
1880	13,016		30.9%
1890	16,708		28.4%
1900	22,055		32.0%
1910	19,949		−9.5%
1920	20,998		5.3%
1930	21,642		3.1%
1940	23,941		10.6%
1950	23,879		−0.3%
1960	23,685		−0.8%
1970	20,896		−11.8%
1980	19,714		−5.7%
1990	16,937		−14.1%
2000	16,181		−4.5%
2010	14,553		−10.1%
2020	13,921		−4.3%
2025 (est.)	13,888	▼	−0.2%
US Decennial Census; 1790–1960 1900–1990; 1990-2000 2010-2020

=== Racial and ethnic composition ===
Faribault County, Minnesota – Racial and ethnic composition Note: the US Census treats Hispanic/Latino as an ethnic category. This table excludes Latinos from the racial categories and assigns them to a separate category. Hispanics/Latinos may be of any race.
Race / Ethnicity (NH = Non-Hispanic)	Pop 1980	Pop 1990	Pop 2000	Pop 2010	Pop 2020	% 1980	% 1990	% 2000	% 2010	% 2020
White alone (NH)	19,351	16,528	15,402	13,519	12,402	98.16%	97.59%	95.19%	92.89%	89.09%
Black or African American alone (NH)	4	10	39	43	55	0.02%	0.06%	0.24%	0.30%	0.40%
Native American or Alaska Native alone (NH)	8	19	29	41	58	0.04%	0.11%	0.18%	0.28%	0.42%
Asian alone (NH)	61	54	57	43	45	0.31%	0.32%	0.35%	0.30%	0.32%
Native Hawaiian or Pacific Islander alone (NH)	x	x	6	0	0	x	x	0.04%	0.00%	0.00%
Other race alone (NH)	12	4	1	1	39	0.06%	0.02%	0.01%	0.01%	0.28%
Mixed race or Multiracial (NH)	x	x	81	89	309	x	x	0.50%	0.61%	2.22%
Hispanic or Latino (any race)	278	322	566	817	1,013	1.41%	1.90%	3.50%	5.61%	7.28%
Total	19,714	16,937	16,181	14,553	13,921	100.00%	100.00%	100.00%	100.00%	100.00%

=== 2020 census ===
As of the 2020 census, the county had a population of 13,921. The median age was 44.9 years. 21.9% of residents were under the age of 18 and 23.5% of residents were 65 years of age or older. For every 100 females there were 100.7 males, and for every 100 females age 18 and over there were 99.7 males age 18 and over.

The racial makeup of the county was 91.5% White, 0.4% Black or African American, 0.6% American Indian and Alaska Native, 0.3% Asian, <0.1% Native Hawaiian and Pacific Islander, 2.9% from some other race, and 4.3% from two or more races. Hispanic or Latino residents of any race comprised 7.3% of the population.

<0.1% of residents lived in urban areas, while 100.0% lived in rural areas.

There were 6,086 households in the county, of which 25.4% had children under the age of 18 living in them. Of all households, 47.4% were married-couple households, 20.7% were households with a male householder and no spouse or partner present, and 24.1% were households with a female householder and no spouse or partner present. About 32.2% of all households were made up of individuals and 16.1% had someone living alone who was 65 years of age or older.

There were 6,916 housing units, of which 12.0% were vacant. Among occupied housing units, 77.9% were owner-occupied and 22.1% were renter-occupied. The homeowner vacancy rate was 1.9% and the rental vacancy rate was 8.5%.

=== 2000 census ===
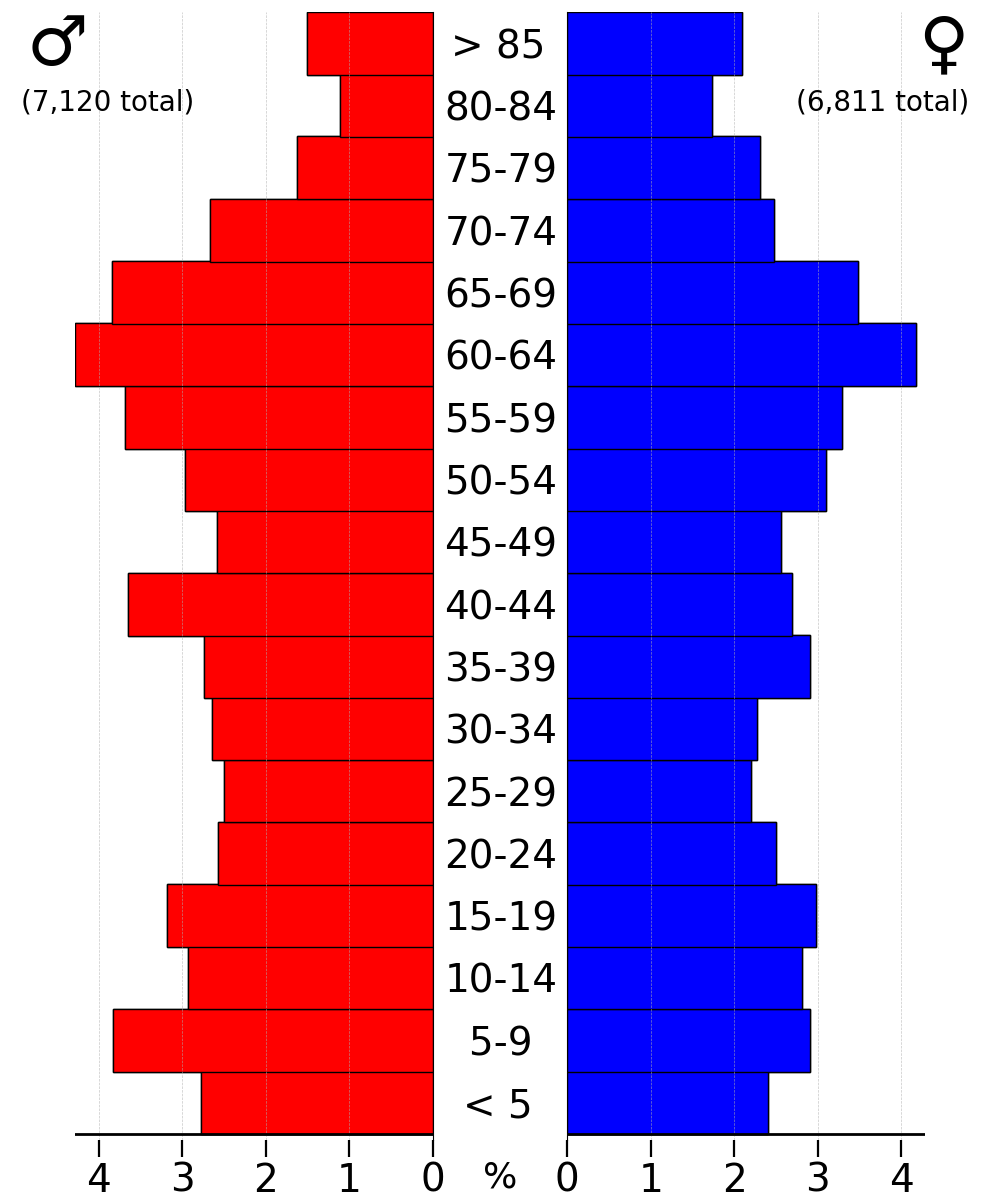
2022 US Census population pyramid for Faribault County, from ACS 5-year estimates

As of the census of 2000, there were 16,181 people, 6,652 households, and 4,476 families in the county. The population density was 22.7 per square mile (8.8/km^{2}). There were 7,247 housing units at an average density of 10.2 per square mile (3.9/km^{2}). The racial makeup of the county was 97.11% White, 0.24% Black or African American, 0.19% Native American, 0.36% Asian, 0.04% Pacific Islander, 1.36% from other races, and 0.69% from two or more races. 3.50% of the population were Hispanic or Latino of any race. 45.5% were of German, 21.2% Norwegian and 5.1% Irish ancestry.

There were 6,652 households, out of which 28.50% had children under the age of 18 living with them, 57.80% were married couples living together, 6.10% had a female householder with no husband present, and 32.70% were non-families. 29.70% of all households were made up of individuals, and 16.80% had someone living alone who was 65 years of age or older. The average household size was 2.36 and the average family size was 2.93.

The county population contained 24.40% under the age of 18, 6.70% from 18 to 24, 23.20% from 25 to 44, 23.50% from 45 to 64, and 22.20% who were 65 years of age or older. The median age was 42 years. For every 100 females there were 97.20 males. For every 100 females age 18 and over, there were 92.50 males.

The median income for a household in the county was $34,440, and the median income for a family was $41,793. Males had a median income of $28,990 versus $20,224 for females. The per capita income for the county was $17,193. About 5.50% of families and 8.60% of the population were below the poverty line, including 9.40% of those under age 18 and 10.20% of those age 65 or over.

== Communities ==
=== Cities ===
- Blue Earth (county seat)
- Bricelyn
- Delavan
- Easton
- Elmore
- Frost
- Kiester
- Minnesota Lake (Partly in Blue Earth County)
- Walters
- Wells
- Winnebago

=== Unincorporated communities ===
- Baroda
- Brush Creek
- Clayton (ghost town)
- Dell
- Guckeen
- Homedahl (ghost town)
- Huntley
- Marna
- Pilot Grove

=== Townships ===
- Barber Township
- Blue Earth City Township
- Brush Creek Township
- Clark Township
- Delavan Township
- Dunbar Township
- Elmore Township
- Emerald Township
- Foster Township
- Jo Daviess Township
- Kiester Township
- Lura Township
- Minnesota Lake Township
- Pilot Grove Township
- Prescott Township
- Rome Township
- Seely Township
- Verona Township
- Walnut Lake Township
- Winnebago City Township

== Government and politics ==
Faribault County has primarily supported Republican Party candidates in presidential elections throughout its history. Only six times since 1892 has a Republican candidate failed to win the county in a presidential election, most recently Bob Dole in 1996.

United States presidential election results for Faribault County, Minnesota
Year	Republican		Democratic		Third party(ies)	
Year	No.	%	No.	%	No.	%
1892	1,992	58.01%	1,070	31.16%	372	10.83%
1896	3,116	71.37%	1,107	25.36%	143	3.28%
1900	2,910	70.61%	936	22.71%	275	6.67%
1904	2,792	77.69%	611	17.00%	191	5.31%
1908	2,305	61.81%	1,039	27.86%	385	10.32%
1912	393	11.71%	919	27.38%	2,045	60.92%
1916	2,184	61.71%	1,123	31.73%	232	6.56%
1920	6,687	86.01%	869	11.18%	219	2.82%
1924	4,682	58.11%	578	7.17%	2,797	34.72%
1928	5,885	69.19%	2,545	29.92%	76	0.89%
1932	4,148	46.65%	4,590	51.62%	154	1.73%
1936	3,773	38.32%	5,603	56.90%	471	4.78%
1940	6,816	62.13%	4,099	37.36%	56	0.51%
1944	5,822	61.37%	3,640	38.37%	25	0.26%
1948	4,619	46.13%	5,261	52.54%	134	1.34%
1952	7,763	71.02%	3,120	28.55%	47	0.43%
1956	6,886	65.80%	3,554	33.96%	25	0.24%
1960	6,975	61.80%	4,301	38.11%	11	0.10%
1964	4,817	44.71%	5,946	55.18%	12	0.11%
1968	5,662	54.53%	4,335	41.75%	387	3.73%
1972	6,503	64.05%	3,519	34.66%	131	1.29%
1976	5,577	51.48%	5,049	46.61%	207	1.91%
1980	6,206	59.21%	3,620	34.54%	655	6.25%
1984	5,690	58.44%	3,993	41.01%	53	0.54%
1988	4,846	55.07%	3,879	44.08%	75	0.85%
1992	3,439	37.60%	3,339	36.51%	2,368	25.89%
1996	3,272	39.60%	3,817	46.20%	1,173	14.20%
2000	4,336	51.47%	3,624	43.02%	464	5.51%
2004	4,794	55.22%	3,767	43.39%	120	1.38%
2008	4,196	51.47%	3,736	45.83%	220	2.70%
2012	4,104	53.21%	3,407	44.17%	202	2.62%
2016	4,659	62.86%	2,153	29.05%	600	8.09%
2020	5,191	65.59%	2,531	31.98%	192	2.43%
2024	5,247	67.61%	2,352	30.31%	162	2.09%

County Board of Commissioners
Position	Name	District	Next Election
Commissioner	John Roper	District 1	2024
Commissioner	Greg Young	District 2	2026
Commissioner and Vice Chair	Bill Groskreutz	District 3	2024
Commissioner	Tom Loveall	District 4	2023
Commissioner and Chairperson	Bruce Anderson	District 5	2024

State Legislature (2025-2026)
Position	Name	Affiliation	District
Senate	Rich Draheim	Republican	District 22
Senate	Gene Dornink	Republican	District 23
House of Representatives	Bjorn Olson	Republican	District 22A
House of Representatives	Peggy Bennett	Republican	District 23A

U.S Congress (2025-2026)
Position	Name	Affiliation	District
House of Representatives	Brad Finstad	Republican	1st
Senate	Amy Klobuchar	Democrat	N/A
Senate	Tina Smith	Democrat	N/A

== Education ==
School districts include:

- Alden-Conger Public School District
- Blue Earth Area Public Schools
- Granada-Huntley-East Chain School District
- Janesville-Waldorf-Pemberton School District
- Maple River School District
- United South Central School District

It also has the following state-operated schools:

- Minnesota State Academy for the Blind
- Minnesota State Academy for the Deaf

== See also ==
- National Register of Historic Places listings in Faribault County, Minnesota
