= Pilot Grove Township, Faribault County, Minnesota =

Township in Minnesota, United States

Pilot Grove Township
- Township
- Location within the state of Minnesota Pilot Grove Township (the United States)
- Coordinates: 43°32′10″N 94°11′51″W
- Country: United States
- State: Minnesota
- County: Faribault

Area
  - Total: 36.0 sq mi (93.2 km^{2})
  - Land: 36.0 sq mi (93.2 km^{2})
  - Water: 0 sq mi (0.0 km^{2})
- Elevation: 1,122 ft (342 m)

Population (2000)
  - Total: 182
  - Density: 5.2/sq mi (2/km^{2})
- Time zone: UTC-6 (Central (CST))
  - Summer (DST): UTC-5 (CDT)
- FIPS code: 27-50974
- GNIS feature ID: 0665299

Pilot Grove Township is a township in Faribault County, Minnesota, United States. The population was 182 at the 2000 census.

== History ==
Pilot Grove Township was organized in 1856, and named from a nearby grove of trees which stood as a landmark to pioneer travelers.

== Geography ==
According to the United States Census Bureau, the township has a total area of 36.0 square miles (93.2 km^{2}), all land.

== Demographics ==
As of the census of 2000, there were 182 people, 73 households, and 55 families residing in the township. The population density was 5.1 people per square mile (2.0/km^{2}). There were 80 housing units at an average density of 2.2/sq mi (0.9/km^{2}). The racial makeup of the township was 98.35% White, 1.10% African American, and 0.55% from two or more races.

There were 71 households, out of which 29.6% had children under the age of 18 living with them, 69.0% were married couples living together, 3.8% had a female householder with no husband present, and 22.5% were non-families. 21.1% of all households were made up of individuals, and 7.0% had someone living alone who was 65 years of age or older. The average household size was 2.56 and the average family size was 2.91.

In the township the population was spread out, with 27.5% under the age of 18, 3.8% from 18 to 24, 29.7% from 25 to 44, 17.0% from 45 to 64, and 22.0% who were 65 years of age or older. The median age was 41 years. For every 100 females, there were 124.7 males. For every 100 females age 18 and over, there were 87 males.

The median income for a household in the township was $42,500, and the maximum income for a family was $47,500. Males had a median income of $30,875 versus $21,000 for females. The per capita income for the township was $16,876. About 4.2% of families and 5.3% of the population were below the poverty line, including 5.6% of those under the age of eighteen and none of those 65 or over.
