= Lura Township, Faribault County, Minnesota =

Township in Minnesota, United States

Lura Township
- Township
- Location within the state of Minnesota Lura Township (the United States)
- Coordinates: 43°48′28″N 93°56′59″W
- Country: United States
- State: Minnesota
- County: Faribault

Area
  - Total: 35.1 sq mi (91.0 km^{2})
  - Land: 35.1 sq mi (91.0 km^{2})
  - Water: 0 sq mi (0.0 km^{2})
- Elevation: 1,050 ft (320 m)

Population (2000)
  - Total: 217
  - Density: 6.2/sq mi (2.4/km^{2})
- Time zone: UTC-6 (Central (CST))
  - Summer (DST): UTC-5 (CDT)
- FIPS code: 27-38528
- GNIS feature ID: 0664838

Lura Township is a township in Faribault County, Minnesota, United States. The population was 217 at the 2000 census.

Lura Township was organized in 1864, and named after Lura Lake.

== Geography ==
According to the United States Census Bureau, the township has a total area of 35.2 square miles (91.0 km^{2}), all land.

== Demographics ==
As of the census of 2000, there were 217 people, 81 households, and 63 families residing in the township. The population density was 6.2 inhabitants per square mile (2.4/km^{2}). There were 83 housing units at an average density of 2.4 per square mile (0.93/km^{2}). The racial makeup of the township was 92.17% White, 1.84% African American, 3.69% from other races, and 2.30% from two or more races. Hispanic or Latino of any race were 4.15% of the population.

There were 81 households, out of which 33.3% had children under the age of 18 living with them, 65.4% were married couples living together, 7.4% had a female householder with no husband present, and 22.2% were non-families. 18.5% of all households were made up of individuals, and 8.6% had someone living alone who was 65 years of age or older. The average household size was 2.68 and the average family size was 3.02.

In the township the population was spread out, with 27.2% under the age of 18, 6.0% from 18 to 24, 25.8% from 25 to 44, 24.9% from 45 to 64, and 16.1% who were 65 years of age or older. The median age was 42 years. For every 100 females, there were 102.8 males. For every 100 females age 18 and over, there were 107.9 males.

The median income for a household in the township was $40,625, and the median income for a family was $41,458. Males had a median income of $28,438 versus $23,125 for females. The per capita income for the township was $17,344. About 17.9% of families and 15.3% of the population were below the poverty line, including 20.6% of those under the age of eighteen and none of those 65 or over.
