= Interstate 90 in Minnesota =

Highway in Minnesota

Interstate 90
- American Veterans Memorial Highway
- I-90 highlighted in red

Route information
- Maintained by MnDOT
- Length: 275.70 mi (443.70 km)
- NHS: Entire route

Major junctions
- West end: I-90 at the South Dakota state line near Beaver Creek
- US 75 at Luverne; US 59 / MN 60 at Worthington; US 71 at Jackson; US 169 at Blue Earth; I-35 near Albert Lea; US 218 at Austin; US 63 at Stewartville; US 52 near Rochester; US 14 / US 61 near La Crescent
- East end: I-90 at the Wisconsin state line near La Crescent

Location
- Country: United States
- State: Minnesota
- Counties: Rock, Nobles, Jackson, Martin, Faribault, Freeborn, Mower, Olmsted, Winona

Highway system
- Interstate Highway System; Main; Auxiliary; Suffixed; Business; Future; Minnesota Trunk Highway System; Interstate; US; State; Legislative; Scenic
← MN 89	→ MN 91

Interstate 90 (I-90) in the US state of Minnesota runs for 276 miles (444 km) across the southern side of the state, parallel to the Iowa state line. The route connects the cities of Worthington, Fairmont, Albert Lea, Austin, and Rochester. The city of Winona is also in close proximity to I-90, with about 10 miles (16 km) between the Interstate and the city.

== Route description ==
I-90 enters the state from South Dakota near Beaver Creek. This part of Minnesota has flat to gently rolling terrain and is the beginnings of Corn Belt farmland. The flat terrain is often subject to blowing and drifting snow in colder months, and the western portions of the highway are closed multiple times each winter.

Rock County, where I-90 enters Minnesota, is one of the only counties in the state lacking a natural lake. The route passes through the cities of Luverne, Adrian, Worthington, Jackson, Fairmont, and Blue Earth. I-90 has an interchange with I-35 at Albert Lea.

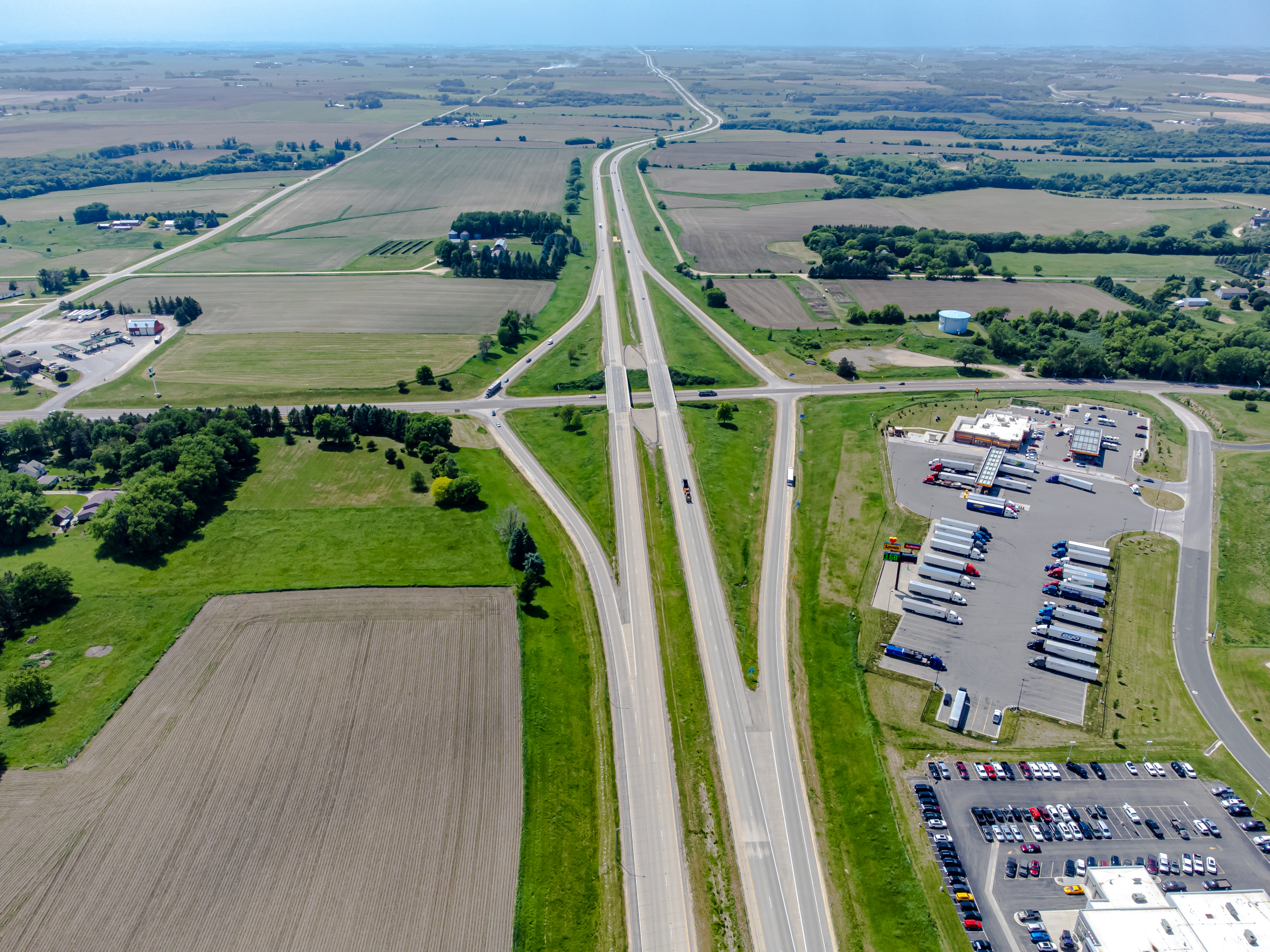
I-90 in Minnesota by St. Charles

East of the city of Austin, I-90 changes direction slightly and heads toward Rochester, and the route enters a much more hilly landscape. This is the Driftless Area of southeast Minnesota. Unlike the rest of the state, where the most recent glaciations left terrain that is either flat or rolling under a deposit of glacial till, this area escaped the most recent glaciation. The bedrock to the top of the I-90 road cuts is noticeable at this point. The other notable feature of this area are deep, steep valleys cut by water that poured through this area as the ice cap melted.

I-90 drops into the scenic Mississippi River valley just west of Dresbach. The carriageways split apart as they descend, and they rejoin west of the junction with US Highway 61 (US 61). I-90 then parallels the Mississippi River before turning east and crossing the Dresbach Bridge over the river into Wisconsin.

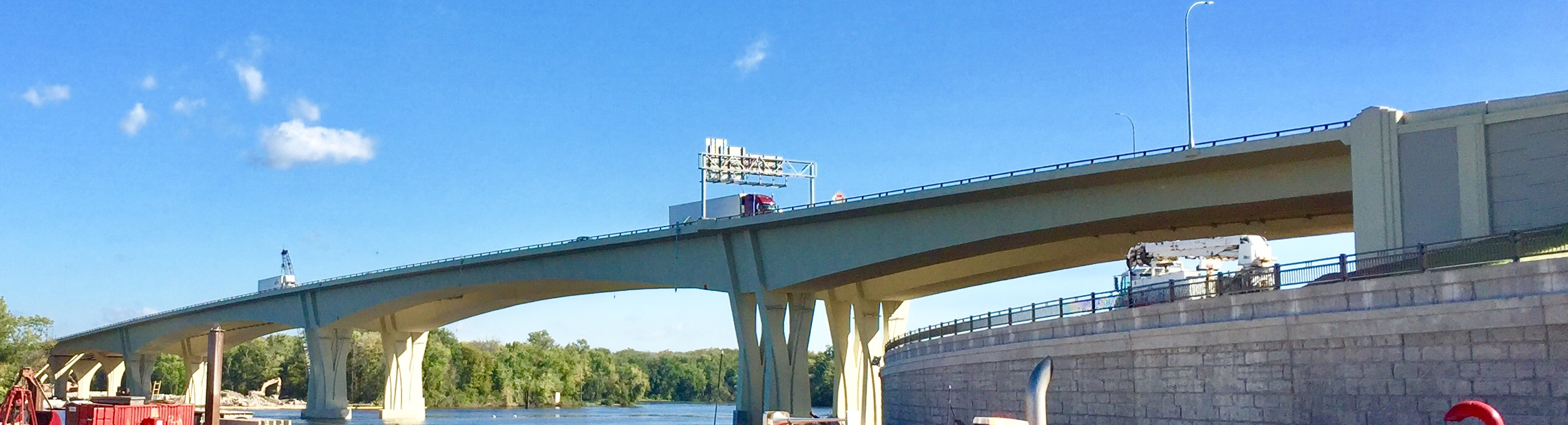
Dresbach Bridge crossing the Mississippi River from Minnesota

I-90 is atypical in that, just across the Minnesota–Wisconsin state line, (immediately west of the community of Dakota) the median is wide enough that farms exist between the road beds.

Legally, the Minnesota section of I-90 is defined as unmarked Legislative Route 391 in the Minnesota Statutes. I-90 is not marked with this legislative number along the actual highway.

== History ==
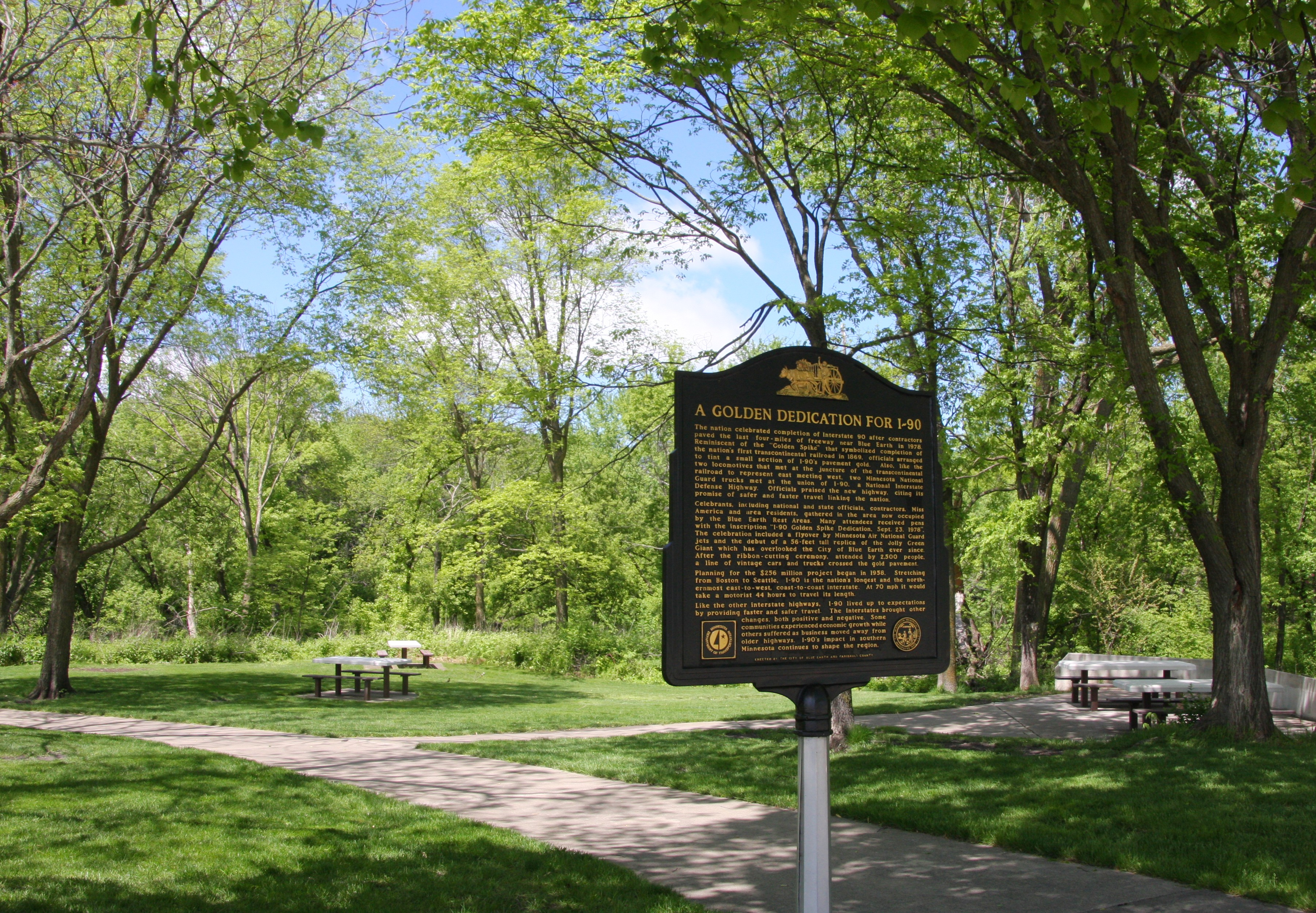
Golden Spike Rest Area near the I-90 midpoint

I-90 in Minnesota was authorized as part of the original Interstate network in 1956. The first section of I-90 in Minnesota constructed was the bypass of Austin in 1961. The wayside rest area near Blue Earth is where the east-building I-90 and west-building I-90 teams linked up in 1978, thus completing construction in Minnesota and joining the 3,099.07 miles (4,987.47 km) of the Interstate. Plaques dedicating the pavement completion and describing the significance of this segment are on display at the rest area.

The westbound and eastbound paving crews added a gold-tinted section of concrete across the roadway to signify the spot where the two crews met in 1978, called the "Golden Stripe." In 2006, this four-foot-wide (1.2 m) stripe was replaced with gold paint on just the shoulder portions while the roadway itself was overlaid with bituminous paving. The Golden Stripe was re-created in the same location both eastbound and westbound during a reconstruction project in 2023 and 2024 while also replacing the bituminous pavement with concrete. To make the new golden stripe, gold powder from Germany was mixed into the concrete used for the new driving surface.

I-90 in Minnesota closely follows the route of old US 16 over most of its route except from just east of Austin, where I-90 turns toward Rochester and is constructed on a new alignment not previously covered by a highway. The section of I-90 east of Rochester was constructed just south of US 14 and south of the city of Winona.

I-90 served as a replacement for old US 16 between the South Dakota state line and I-90's interchange with present-day Minnesota State Highway 16 (MN 16) at Dexter.

== Exit list ==
County	Location	mi	km	Exit	Destinations	Notes
Rock	Beaver Creek Township	0.000	0.000		I-90 west – Sioux Falls	Continuation into South Dakota
Rock	Beaver Creek Township	1.057	1.701	1	MN 23 / CSAH 17 – Pipestone, Larchwood	
Rock	Beaver Creek	3.895	6.268	3	CSAH 4 – Beaver Creek	Eastbound exit and westbound entrance
Rock	Beaver Creek	5.074	8.166	5	CSAH 6 – Beaver Creek, Hills	
Rock	Luverne	12.479	20.083	12	US 75 – Luverne, Rock Rapids	
Rock	Magnolia	18.483	29.746	18	CSAH 3 – Magnolia, Kanaranzi	
Nobles	Adrian	26.620	42.841	26	MN 91 – Adrian, Lake Wilson	
Nobles	Rushmore	33.707	54.246	33	CSAH 13 – Rushmore, Wilmont	
Nobles	Worthington	42.255	68.003	42	I-90 BL east / CSAH 25 – Wilmont	Road from exit into Wilmont was formerly MN 266
Nobles	Worthington	43.739	70.391	43	US 59 – Worthington, Fulda	
Nobles	Worthington	45.148	72.659	45	I-90 BL west / MN 60 – Windom	
Nobles	Lorain Township	47.796	76.920	47	CSAH 3	Eastbound exit and westbound entrance
Nobles–Jackson county line	Lorain–Ewington township line	50.738	81.655	50	MN 264 / CSAH 1 – Brewster, Round Lake	
Jackson	Rost Township	57.728	92.904	57	CSAH 9 – Okabena, Heron Lake	
Jackson	Hunter Township	64.767	104.232	64	MN 86 – Lakefield, Spirit Lake	
Jackson	Jackson	73.813	118.791	73	US 71 – Jackson, Windom, Spirit Lake	
Jackson	Alpha	80.083	128.881	80	CSAH 29 – Alpha	
Martin	Sherburn	87.309	140.510	87	MN 4 – Sherburn, St. James, Estherville	
Martin	Welcome	93.675	150.755	93	CSAH 27 – Welcome, Ceylon	Road from exit into Ceylon was formerly MN 263
Martin	Fairmont	99.807	160.624	99	I-90 BL east / CSAH 39 – Fairmont	
Martin	Fairmont	102.053	164.238	102	I-90 BL west / MN 15 – Madelia, Fairmont	
Martin	Granada	107.202	172.525	107	CSAH 53 – Granada, East Chain	Road from exit into Granada was formerly MN 262
Faribault	Guckeen	113.272	182.294	113	CSAH 1 – Guckeen, Huntley	
Faribault	Blue Earth	119.909	192.975	119	US 169 – Blue Earth, Mankato, Winnebago, Elmore	Green Giant
Faribault	Emerald Township	128.538	206.862	128	CSAH 17 – Easton, Frost	Road from exit into Frost was formerly MN 254
Faribault	Brush Creek Township	134.546	216.531	134	CSAH 23 / CSAH 21 – Minnesota Lake, Bricelyn	Road from exit into Bricelyn was formerly MN 253
Faribault	Foster Township	138.630	223.103	138	MN 22 – Wells, Kiester	
Freeborn	Alden	146.292	235.434	146	MN 109 / CSAH 6 – Alden, Mankato	
Freeborn	Albert Lea	154.739	249.028	154	MN 13 to US 69 – Albert Lea, Waseca	
Freeborn	Albert Lea	157.826	253.996	157	CSAH 22 – Albert Lea	
Freeborn	Bancroft Township	159.740	257.077	159	I-35 – Albert Lea, Des Moines, Minneapolis, St. Paul	Signed as exits 159A (south) and 159B (north); I-35 exits 13A-B
Freeborn	Hayward	163.705	263.458	163	CSAH 26 – Hayward	
Freeborn	Oakland	166.321	267.668	166	CSAH 46 (Oakland Road) – Petran, Oakland	
Mower	Austin	175.488	282.421	175	I-90 BL east / MN 105 / CSAH 46 / Oakland Avenue	
Mower	Austin	177.188	285.156	177	US 218 north / 14th Street NW – Owatonna	West end of US 218 concurrency
Mower	Austin	177.872	286.257	178A	CSAH 45 / 4th Street NW	
Mower	Austin	178.506	287.278	178B	6th Street NE	
Mower	Austin	179.148	288.311	179	11th Drive NE	
Mower	Austin	179.741	289.265	180A	I-90 BL west / Oakland Place	Westbound exit and eastbound entrance
Mower	Austin	180.024	289.721	180B	US 218 south / 21st Street Northeast – Lyle	East end of US 218 concurrency
Mower	Austin	180.500	290.487	181	CSAH 58 / 28th Street NE	
Mower	Windom Township	183.562	295.414	183	MN 56 – Brownsdale, Rose Creek	
Mower	Marshall Township	187.338	301.491	187	CSAH 20	
Mower	Dexter Township	189.584	305.106	189	CSAH 13 – Elkton	
Mower	Dexter	193.048	310.681	193	MN 16 – Dexter, Grand Meadow, Spring Valley, Preston	
Olmsted	High Forest Township	205.054	330.002	205	CSAH 6	
Olmsted	Stewartville	209.270	336.787	209	US 63 / MN 30 – Stewartville, Rochester	Signed as exits 209A (south/east) and 209B (north/west)
Olmsted	Marion Township	217.018	349.257	217	US 52 – Chatfield, Rochester	Chatfield only appears on eastbound signage, Rochester only appears on westbound signage; signed as exits 217 (both directions, currently) and 218 (both directions, formally); formerly exit 218, it was renamed
Olmsted	Eyota	223.606	359.859	224	MN 42 north / CSAH 7 – Eyota	
Olmsted	Dover	228.572	367.851	229	CSAH 10 – Dover	
Winona	St. Charles	232.291	373.836	233	MN 74 – St. Charles, Chatfield	
Winona	Fremont Township	242.061	389.559	242	CSAH 29 – Lewiston	
Winona	Warren Township	249.103	400.892	249	MN 43 south – Rushford	West end of MN 43 concurrency
Winona	Wilson Township	252.059	405.650	252	MN 43 north – Winona	East end of MN 43 concurrency
Winona	Pleasant Hill Township	257.692	414.715	258	MN 76 south – Houston	Northern terminus of MN 76
Winona	Nodine	266.017	428.113	267	CSAH 12 – Nodine	
Winona	New Hartford Township	270.288	434.986	270	US 14 west / US 61 north / Great River Road north – Winona	Westbound exit only
Winona	Dakota	271.232	436.506	271	To US 14 west / US 61 north – Dakota	Eastbound exit only
Winona	Dresbach	272.663– 272.681	438.809– 438.838	273	Dresbach	Signed as exits 273A (first exit) and 273B (second exit) eastbound
Winona	La Crescent	275.243	442.961	276	US 14 east / US 61 south / Great River Road south – La Crescent, La Crosse	East end of US 14 / US 61 concurrency
Mississippi River		275.701	443.698	I-90 Mississippi River Bridge		
Mississippi River		275.701	443.698		I-90 east – Tomah	Continuation into Wisconsin
1.000 mi = 1.609 km; 1.000 km = 0.621 mi: Concurrency terminus; Incomplete access

Interstate 90
Previous state: South Dakota	Minnesota	Next state: Wisconsin
