= Red Rock Township =

Red Rock Township may refer to:

== Canada ==
- Red Rock, Ontario

== United States ==
- Red Rock Township, Marion County, Iowa, in Marion County, Iowa
- Red Rock Township, Mower County, Minnesota
- Red Rock Township, Minnehaha County, South Dakota, in Minnehaha County, South Dakota
