= Lake Ocheda (Minnesota) =

Lake in the state of Minnesota, United States

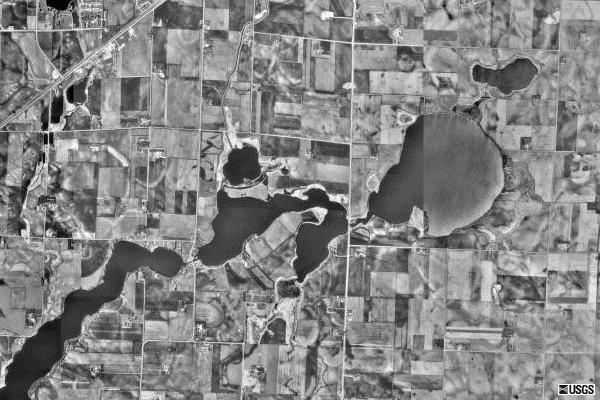
- USGS satellite photo of Lake Ocheda

- Location within Minnesota Location within the United States

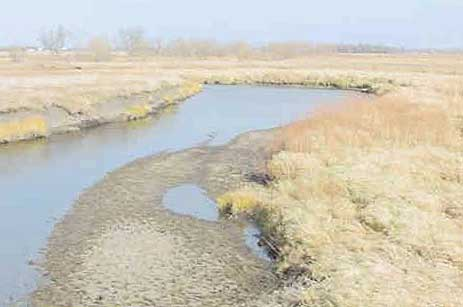
- The Ocheyedan River flows out of Lake Ocheda and joins the Little Sioux River near Spencer, Iowa.
- Location: Nobles County, Minnesota
- Coordinates: 43°34′44″N 95°35′00″W
- Lake type: Glacial lake
- Primary inflows: Judicial Ditch #9, Judicial Ditch #10, and several small creeks
- Primary outflows: The Ocheyedan River
- Max. length: 5.5 mi (8.9 km)
- Max. width: 0.5 mi (0.80 km)
- Surface area: 1,917 acres (776 ha)
- Average depth: 3 ft (0.91 m)
- Max. depth: 5 ft (1.5 m)
- Surface elevation: 475.5 m (1,560 ft)

== Physical geography of Lake Ocheda ==
Lake Ocheda is a lake located in Nobles County, three miles south of Worthington, Minnesota. The lake is a long, narrow, body of water that extends east to west for approximately 5½ miles. The width varies from a few hundred yards, to a bit over 1/2 mile. Lake Ocheda is divided into three natural sections, West Ocheda, the Middle Bay, and East Ocheda. The three sections are connected to one another by two narrow channels of water. The average lake depth is less than three feet. The maximum depth is only about five feet, though it was much deeper in years past. An 1882 geology report prepared by the State of Minnesota indicates that the lake once had a maximum depth of 20 feet. Local residents attribute the decrease in depth to erosion from surrounding farm lands. Lake Ocheda is managed by the Okabena-Ocheda Watershed District.

== First settlers ==
The first permanent settlers on Lake Ocheda were Ole Fauskee and his family. Ole migrated from Norway to the United States in 1867 when he was 25 years old. He was travelling through southwest Minnesota with his brother when his ox team gave out. He liked the country he saw, and on June 8, 1870, he and his brother walked all the way to Jackson, Minnesota, to file claims. Ole Fauskee claimed the northwest quarter of section 6 of Indian Lake Township, and his brother made an adjacent claim. This was before the railroad had come to Nobles County, and the only other permanent settlements in the county were in the vicinity of Graham Lakes and Indian Lake. Fauskee erected a sod hut on the banks of East Lake Ocheda and lived there for five years. He also claimed the northeast quarter of section 12 of Bigelow Township. Fauskee eventually built a home of lumber there, and prospered as a farmer.

== Public access ==
There are two public access points on the lake. The first is Pickeral County Park, a Nobles County Park located on the northwestern shore of West Ocheda. The second is another Nobles County Park located where a highway bridge crosses the channel between the Middle Bay and East Ocheda. This is known as Sportsman's Park. Both parks are popular with local fishermen.

== Fishing ==
Despite being very shallow, Lake Ocheda is well-stocked with several varieties of fish. Black Bullheads and Yellow Bullheads are abundant. Black Crappies and White crappies are also very common, as are orangspotted sunfish and yellow perch. The lake is stocked yearly with northern pike and yellow perch because these species can tolerate low oxygen-levels better than other game species. Ocheda Lake is a very shallow lake and it often experiences low oxygen during the winter. Complete winterkills of northern pike and yellow perch have never been documented. The northern pike population has done quite well for the last six years. Northern pike numbers have remained near average for lakes similar to Ocheda Lake. Northern pike lengths ranged from 16.5 to 30.0 inches.
