= Minnesota State Highway 264 =

State highway in Minnesota, United States

Trunk Highway 264
- MN 264 highlighted in red

Route information
- Maintained by MnDOT
- Length: 7.394 mi (11.899 km)
- Existed: July 1, 1949–present

Major junctions
- South end: CSAH 21 at Round Lake
- North end: I-90 / CSAH 1 near Worthington

Location
- Country: United States
- State: Minnesota
- Counties: Nobles, Jackson

Highway system
- Minnesota Trunk Highway System; Interstate; US; State; Legislative; Scenic
← MN 263	→ MN 267

Minnesota State Highway 264 (MN 264) is a 7.394-mile-long (11.899 km) highway in southwest Minnesota, which runs from its intersection with Nobles County State-Aid Highway 21 (2nd Avenue) in Round Lake and continues north to its northern terminus at its interchange with Interstate 90 and Jackson County State-Aid Highway 1, six miles east of Worthington.

== Route description ==
Highway 264 serves as a north–south connector route in southwest Minnesota between Round Lake and Interstate 90.

The route runs along the county line for Nobles and Jackson counties for most of its length.

Highway 264 follows Amy Avenue and Main Street in Round Lake.

The route is legally defined as Route 264 in the Minnesota Statutes.

The route is facing a turnback to Nobles and Jackson Counties, as the legislative route is being removed.

== History ==
Highway 264 was authorized on July 1, 1949.

The route was paved in the mid-1950s.

== Major intersections ==
County	Location	mi	km	Destinations	Notes
Nobles	Round Lake	0.000	0.000	CSAH 21 (2nd Avenue)	
Nobles	Indian Lake Township	0.991	1.595	CSAH 4	
Nobles–Jackson county line	Lorain–Ewington township line	5.794	9.325	CSAH 35 west / CSAH 34 east	
Nobles–Jackson county line	Lorain–Ewington township line	7.245– 7.394	11.660– 11.899	I-90 / CSAH 1 north – Jackson, Worthington	Continues as CSAH 1 north of I-90
1.000 mi = 1.609 km; 1.000 km = 0.621 mi
