= Round Lake, Minnesota =

City in Minnesota, United States

Round Lake
- City
- Motto: "A Great Place To Live, Work, And Play"
- Location of Round Lake, Minnesota
- Coordinates: 43°32′14″N 95°28′12″W
- Country: United States
- State: Minnesota
- County: Nobles

Government
  - Type: Mayor - Council
  - Mayor: Tim Kennedy

Area
  - Total: 0.73 sq mi (1.89 km^{2})
  - Land: 0.73 sq mi (1.88 km^{2})
  - Water: 0.0039 sq mi (0.01 km^{2})
- Elevation: 1,555 ft (474 m)

Population (2020)
  - Total: 377
  - Density: 519.8/sq mi (200.69/km^{2})
- Time zone: UTC-6 (Central (CST))
  - Summer (DST): UTC-5 (CDT)
- ZIP code: 56167
- Area code: 507
- FIPS code: 27-56086
- GNIS feature ID: 2396440
- Website: roundlk.net

Round Lake is a city in Nobles County, Minnesota, United States. As of the 2020 census, Round Lake had a population of 377.

== Geography ==
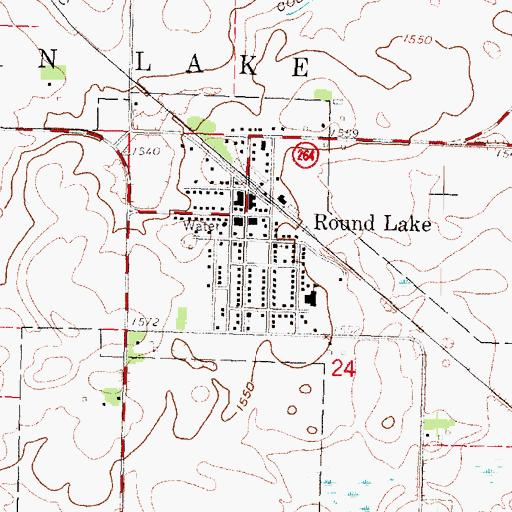
Topographic map of Round Lake

According to the United States Census Bureau, the city has a total area of 1.04 square miles (2.69 km^{2}), of which 1.03 square miles (2.67 km^{2}) is land and 0.01 square miles (0.03 km^{2}) is water. A lake, also called Round Lake, is just outside the city to the northeast. The town of Round Lake is located in the extreme southeast corner of Nobles County. It lies one-half miles west of the Jackson County line, and two miles (3 km) north of Iowa.

Main highways include:

- Minnesota State Highway 264
- Nobles County Road 1
- Nobles County Road 3

== History ==
Round Lake street scene

Round Lake School, constructed in 1898

Founding of Round Lake: Round Lake was established in 1882 when the Burlington Railroad built a line connecting Lake Park, Iowa, to Worthington, Minnesota. A site for a railroad station was chosen in fall of 1882, and the initial choice of name was Indian Lake, after the township in which it was located. However, a wealthy Chicago Board of Trade operator named Mr. O. H. Roche donated 20 acres (81,000 m^{2}) of land for a townsite, and it was his wish that it be called Round Lake. Mr. Roche owned nearly 2,000 acres (8.1 km^{2}) of land on nearby Round Lake in Jackson County, and he was apparently fond of the name Round Lake. A town was platted in December 1882 and the site was divided into 100 lots, not one of which were sold. Only two buildings were built in that first year, and both were constructed by the railroad. The railroad section foreman and his crew were the only residents of the new town, until October 1883 when E. A. Tripp came to town to assume duties as station agent. A post office named Indian Lake was established in March 1884, and Mr. Tripp became the postmaster. When another post office with the name Round Lake (located on Round Lake in Jackson County) was closed, the post office in the town of Round Lake assumed the name of that town. A few businesses moved to town, but by 1887, the town had a mere 34 residents. In 1889, the town was re-platted, correcting some legal issues with the original plat, and real growth began. Nine years later, Round Lake boasted numerous businesses, a bank, a newspaper, and 179 residents. Residents voted to incorporate the town, and on October 11, 1898, the first election was held, and town government began under President A. F. Diehn. A new $2,000 school was erected at this time.

== Demographics ==
Historical population
Census	Pop.	Note	%±
1890	174		—
1900	226		29.9%
1910	237		4.9%
1920	345		45.6%
1930	403		16.8%
1940	430		6.7%
1950	435		1.2%
1960	449		3.2%
1970	506		12.7%
1980	480		−5.1%
1990	463		−3.5%
2000	424		−8.4%
2010	376		−11.3%
2020	377		0.3%
U.S. Decennial Census

=== 2010 census ===
As of the census of 2010, there were 376 people, 184 households, and 110 families residing in the city. The population density was 365.0 inhabitants per square mile (140.9/km^{2}). There were 210 housing units at an average density of 203.9 per square mile (78.7/km^{2}). The racial makeup of the city was 99.5% White, 0.3% African American, and 0.3% from other races. Hispanic or Latino of any race were 3.2% of the population.

There were 184 households, of which 22.8% had children under the age of 18 living with them, 46.2% were married couples living together, 8.7% had a female householder with no husband present, 4.9% had a male householder with no wife present, and 40.2% were non-families. 39.1% of all households were made up of individuals, and 14.6% had someone living alone who was 65 years of age or older. The average household size was 2.04 and the average family size was 2.63.

The median age in the city was 46 years. 18.1% of residents were under the age of 18; 4.5% were between the ages of 18 and 24; 26.1% were from 25 to 44; 33.3% were from 45 to 64; and 18.1% were 65 years of age or older. The gender makeup of the city was 50.0% male and 50.0% female.

=== 2000 census ===
As of the census of 2000, there were 424 people, 191 households, and 109 families residing in the city. The population density was 408.8 inhabitants per square mile (157.8/km^{2}). There were 214 housing units at an average density of 206.3 per square mile (79.7/km^{2}). The racial makeup of the city was 97.64% White, and 2.36% from two or more races. Hispanic or Latino of any race were 1.89% of the population.

There were 191 households, out of which 29.8% had children under the age of 18 living with them, 49.2% were married couples living together, 6.3% had a female householder with no husband present, and 42.9% were non-families. 38.7% of all households were made up of individuals, and 17.8% had someone living alone who was 65 years of age or older. The average household size was 2.22 and the average family size was 2.99.

In the city, the population was spread out, with 23.6% under the age of 18, 9.0% from 18 to 24, 29.0% from 25 to 44, 20.0% from 45 to 64, and 18.4% who were 65 years of age or older. The median age was 38 years. For every 100 females, there were 82.8 males. For every 100 females age 18 and over, there were 79.0 males.

The median income for a household in the city was $25,938, and the median income for a family was $36,125. Males had a median income of $25,278 versus $17,596 for females. The per capita income for the city was $15,476. About 10.7% of families and 11.3% of the population were below the poverty line, including 15.5% of those under age 18 and 12.8% of those age 65 or over.

== Community ==
Round Lake was established in 1882. The town hosts many events like the Horned Trout Tournament held every July, Sun-and-Fun Day in June, and Soupstock in August.

== Economy ==
Farley's & Sathers Candy Company was formerly based in Round Lake.

== Politics ==
Round Lake is located in Minnesota's 1st congressional district, represented by Jim Hagedorn, a Republican. At the state level, Round Lake is located in Senate District 22, represented by Republican Bill Weber, and in House District 22B, represented by Republican Rod Hamilton.

=== Local politics ===
The mayor of Round Lake is Tim Kennedy. Council members are Walon Habben, Court Baumgard, Dennis Bucholz, and Gary Larson. The city Clerk/Treasurer is Sandy Consoer. Round Lake is located in Indian Lake Township and is represented by Nobles County Commissioner Marvin Zylstra.
