= Don Frerichs =

American businessman and politician (1931–2019)

Donald L. Frerichs (January 3, 1931 – June 27, 2019) was an American businessman and politician.

Frerichs was born in Ocheyedan, Iowa. He lived in Worthington, Minnesota and graduated from Worthington Senior High School, in 1949, and from Minnesota State University, Mankato. Frerichs served in the United States Army. He moved to Rochester, Minnesota in 1958 with his wife and family. Frerichs was involved with the hardware, real estate, and investment businesses. Frerichs served in the Minnesota House of Representatives from 1981 to 1997 and was a Republican. Frerichs died at St. Mary's Hospital in Rochester, Minnesota.
