= Big South Conference (Minnesota) =

- Classification: MSHSL
- Founded: 2013
- Region: Minnesota

The Big South Conference is a Minnesota State High School League sanctioned athletic conference, comprising schools located in the south central and southwest regions of Minnesota. The conference was founded in 2013. The Big South Conference play began with the 2014–2015 school year. Belle Plaine and Tri-City United joined The Big South Conference in the fall of 2024.

Foundation members of the conference were thirteen schools, with six coming from the South Central Conference (the SCC of the c. pre-2010s (Note: Not to be confused with a newly-formed South Central Conference, begun in 2024.)), which competed in the East Division, and seven coming from the Southwest Conference (SWC), which competes in the West Division.

Foundation Big South Conference members
Institution	Location	Community Population (2020)	Founded	Status	Enrollment (2026)	Nickname	Prev. conf	Notes
Blue Earth Area High School	Blue Earth	3,174	1957	Public	256	Buccaneers	SCC	
Fairmont High School	Fairmont	10,487	1989	Public	482	Cardinals	SCC	
Jackson County Central High School	Jackson	3,323	1997	Public	285	Huskies	SWC	
Luverne High School	Luverne	4,946	1878	Public	317	Cardinals	SWC	
Marshall High School	Marshall	13,628	1884	Public	735	Tigers	SWC	
New Ulm High School	New Ulm	14,120	1857	Public	619	Eagles	SCC	
Pipestone Area High School	Pipestone	4,215	1891	Public	256	Arrows	SWC	
Redwood Valley High School	Redwood Falls	5,102	1882	Public	310	Cardinals	SWC	
St. James Area High School	Saint James	4,793	1896	Public	255	Saints	SCC	
St. Peter High School	St. Peter	12,066	1865	Public	604	Saints	SCC	
Waseca High School	Waseca	9,229	1878	Public	474	Bluejays	SCC	
Windom Area High School	Windom	4,798	1894	Public	263	Eagles	SWC	
Worthington Senior High School	Worthington	13,947	1881	Public	848	Trojans	SWC	
Belle Plaine High School	Belle Plaine	7,395	1897	Public	438	Tigers	MRC	
Tri-City United High School	Montgomery	3,249	2012	Public	528	Titans	MRC	
