= Nicolville, Minnesota =

- Unincorporated community
- Location within Minnesota Location within the United States
- Coordinates: 43°40′29″N 92°52′42″W
- Country: United States
- State: Minnesota
- County: Mower
- Townships: Red Rock, Windom
- Elevation: 1,243 ft (379 m)
- Time zone: UTC-6 (Central (CST))
  - Summer (DST): UTC-5 (CDT)
- Area code: 507
- GNIS feature ID: 648549

Nicolville is an unincorporated community in Mower County, Minnesota, United States. The community is on a side road off of 220th St/ County Road 46, approximately one quarter mile north of I-90 and approximately three miles east of Austin.
