= George Myrum =

American athlete and coach (1897–1938)

Biographical details
- Born: November 4, 1897; Worthington, Minnesota, U.S.
- Died: November 12, 1938 (aged 41); Minneapolis, Minnesota, U.S.

Playing career

Football
- 1921–1922: Minnesota

Basketball
- 1922–1923: Minnesota

Coaching career (HC unless noted)

Football
- 1924–1925: Gustavus Adolphus (assistant)
- 1926–1938: Gustavus Adolphus

Basketball
- 1926–1939: Gustavus Adolphus

Basketball
- 1933–1938: Gustavus Adolphus

Administrative career (AD unless noted)
- 1926–1939: Gustavus Adolphus

Head coaching record
- Overall: 62–20–6 (football); 70–40 (basketball); 109–36 (baseball)

Accomplishments and honors

Championships
- Football; 6 MIAC (1926–1927, 1933, 1935–1937)

George Bernard Myrum (November 4, 1897 – November 12, 1938) was an American college football, basketball, and baseball player and coach. He served as the head football coach at Gustavus Adolphus College in St. Peter, Minnesota from 1926 to 1938, compiling a record of 62–20–6.

== Head coaching record ==
=== Football ===
Year	Team	Overall	Conference	Standing	Bowl/playoffs
Gustavus Adolphus Gusties (Minnesota Intercollegiate Athletic Conference) (1926–1938)
1926	Gustavus Adolphus	7–0	6–0	1st	
1927	Gustavus Adolphus	7–1	5–0	1st	
1928	Gustavus Adolphus	4–3	4–3	3rd	
1929	Gustavus Adolphus	6–2	3–2	T–4th	
1930	Gustavus Adolphus	6–2	4–2	3rd	
1931	Gustavus Adolphus	2–5	2–4	6th	
1932	Gustavus Adolphus	3–1–1	3–1–1	2nd	
1933	Gustavus Adolphus	5–0–2	4–0–1	1st	
1934	Gustavus Adolphus	0–4–1	0–4	8th	
1935	Gustavus Adolphus	6–0–2	4–0–1	1st	
1936	Gustavus Adolphus	5–1	5–0	1st	
1937	Gustavus Adolphus	6–0	5–0	1st	
1938	Gustavus Adolphus	5–1	4–1	2nd	
Gustavus Adolphus:		63–20–6	49–17–3		
Total:		62–20–6			
National championship Conference title Conference division title or championship game berth
