= Francis Judge =

Francis Judge may refer to:

- Francis W. Judge (1838–1904), English-born American soldier and Medal of Honor recipient
- Francis G. Judge (1908–1994), American electrician, businessman, and politician in Minnesota
