= Brownsdale, Minnesota =

City in Minnesota, United States

- City
- Motto: "Garden Spot of Mower County"
- Location in Mower County and the state of Minnesota
- Coordinates: 43°44′25″N 92°52′15″W
- Country: United States
- State: Minnesota
- County: Mower

Area
  - Total: 0.40 sq mi (1.0 km^{2})
  - Land: 0.40 sq mi (1.0 km^{2})
  - Water: 0.0 sq mi (0 km^{2})
- Elevation: 1,293 ft (394 m)

Population (2020)
  - Total: 633
  - Density: 1,564.9/sq mi (604.23/km^{2})
- Time zone: UTC-6 (Central (CST))
  - Summer (DST): UTC-5 (CDT)
- ZIP code: 55918
- Area code: 507
- FIPS code: 27-08164
- GNIS feature ID: 2393440
- Website: brownsdalemn.gov

Brownsdale is a city in Mower County, Minnesota, United States. The population was 633 at the 2020 census.

== History ==
Brownsdale was platted in 1856, and named for Andrew D. Brown, a businessman in the lumber industry. A post office has been in operation at Brownsdale since 1857. Brownsdale was incorporated in 1876.

== Geography ==
Brownsdale is in northwestern Mower County, 9 miles (14 km) northeast of Austin, the county seat. It is surrounded by Red Rock Township but is independent from it. Minnesota State Highway 56 passes through the center of Brownsdale, leading north 6 miles (10 km) to Waltham and south 4.5 miles (7.2 km) to Interstate 90 near Nicolville.

According to the U.S. Census Bureau, Brownsdale has an area of 0.40 square miles (1.04 km^{2}), all land. The north side of the city drains to Roberts Creek, while the south side drains to Wolf Creek; both creeks are west-flowing tributaries of the Cedar River.

== Demographics ==
Historical population
Census	Pop.	Note	%±
1880	346		—
1890	282		−18.5%
1900	261		−7.4%
1910	264		1.1%
1920	271		2.7%
1930	273		0.7%
1940	355		30.0%
1950	493		38.9%
1960	622		26.2%
1970	625		0.5%
1980	691		10.6%
1990	695		0.6%
2000	718		3.3%
2010	676		−5.8%
2020	633		−6.4%
U.S. Decennial Census

=== 2010 census ===
As of the census of 2010, there were 676 people, 286 households, and 190 families living in the city. The population density was 1,438.3 inhabitants per square mile (555.3/km^{2}). There were 315 housing units at an average density of 670.2 per square mile (258.8/km^{2}). The racial makeup of the city was 98.1% White, 0.1% African American, 1.3% from other races, and 0.4% from two or more races. Hispanic or Latino of any race were 5.5% of the population.

There were 286 households, of which 30.1% had children under the age of 18 living with them, 48.6% were married couples living together, 13.3% had a female householder with no husband present, 4.5% had a male householder with no wife present, and 33.6% were non-families. 25.2% of all households were made up of individuals, and 14.7% had someone living alone who was 65 years of age or older. The average household size was 2.36 and the average family size was 2.83.

The median age in the city was 41.4 years. 24.6% of residents were under the age of 18; 5% were between the ages of 18 and 24; 24.1% were from 25 to 44; 28.5% were from 45 to 64; and 17.8% were 65 years of age or older. The gender makeup of the city was 46.7% male and 53.3% female.

=== 2000 census ===
As of the census of 2000, there were 718 people, 290 households, and 198 families living in the city. The population density was 1,574.4 inhabitants per square mile (607.9/km^{2}). There were 312 housing units at an average density of 684.1 per square mile (264.1/km^{2}). The racial makeup of the city was 95.40% White, 3.48% from other races, and 1.11% from two or more races. Hispanic or Latino of any race were 3.48% of the population.

There were 290 households, out of which 30.7% had children under the age of 18 living with them, 55.9% were married couples living together, 8.3% had a female householder with no husband present, and 31.7% were non-families. 26.9% of all households were made up of individuals, and 13.4% had someone living alone who was 65 years of age or older. The average household size was 2.48 and the average family size was 2.97.

In the city, the population was spread out, with 26.3% under the age of 18, 8.9% from 18 to 24, 26.0% from 25 to 44, 20.8% from 45 to 64, and 18.0% who were 65 years of age or older. The median age was 37 years. For every 100 females, there were 102.8 males. For every 100 females age 18 and over, there were 98.9 males.

The median income for a household in the city was $32,857, and the median income for a family was $43,864. Males had a median income of $31,842 versus $22,031 for females. The per capita income for the city was $15,778. About 4.5% of families and 7.4% of the population were below the poverty line, including 4.3% of those under age 18 and 10.3% of those age 65 or over.

== See also ==
- Brownsdale Public Library
