= Red Rock Township, Mower County, Minnesota =

Red Rock Township, Minnesota
- Township
- Location within the state of Minnesota Red Rock Township, Minnesota (the United States)
- Coordinates: 43°43′27″N 92°52′45″W
- Country: United States
- State: Minnesota
- County: Mower

Area
  - Total: 35.4 sq mi (91.7 km^{2})
  - Land: 35.4 sq mi (91.7 km^{2})
  - Water: 0 sq mi (0.0 km^{2})
- Elevation: 1,266 ft (386 m)

Population (2000)
  - Total: 715
  - Density: 20/sq mi (7.8/km^{2})
- Time zone: UTC-6 (Central (CST))
  - Summer (DST): UTC-5 (CDT)
- ZIP code: 55918
- Area code: 507
- FIPS code: 27-53584
- GNIS feature ID: 0665388
- Website: redrocktownship.org

Red Rock Township is a township in Mower County, Minnesota, United States. The population was 715 at the 2000 census. The largest town in the township is Brownsdale with a population of 718 people. All other area in the township is unincorporated. The township is named for a large, red rock in section 4.

== History ==
In 1855 John L. Johnson came to the township from Wisconsin and built a sod shanty in a grove of trees in section 4 that had a large, red rock in it. This grove eventually became known as Red Rock Grove and later the whole township took its name from this area. The rock can still be seen in section 5 (about 1.5 miles northwest of Brownsdale) in the southeast corner of the land owned by Craig Bauman. The area of Red Rock Township around the town of Brownsdale was the source of much of the lumber which helped to build Mower County. Most of the wooded sections of the township were logged in the 1850s and 1860s and much that wood was cut in Brownsdale's steam-powered sawmill, one of the town's first permanent structures. The township is now largely treeless, with the only significant stands being along Roberts Creek and Dobbins Creek.

== Geography ==
According to the United States Census Bureau, the township has a total area of 35.4 square miles (91.7 km^{2}), all land.

== Demographics ==
As of the census of 2000, there were 715 people, 271 households, and 215 families residing in the township. The population density was 20.2 people per square mile (7.8/km^{2}). There were 286 housing units at an average density of 8.1/sq mi (3.1/km^{2}). The racial makeup of the township was 99.58% White, 0.14% African American, 0.14% Native American, and 0.14% from two or more races. Hispanic or Latino of any race were 0.84% of the population.

There were 271 households, out of which 32.1% had children under the age of 18 living with them, 74.2% were married couples living together, 3.7% had a female householder with no husband present, and 20.3% were non-families. 15.5% of all households were made up of individuals, and 5.5% had someone living alone who was 65 years of age or older. The average household size was 2.64 and the average family size was 2.96.

In the township the population was spread out, with 24.8% under the age of 18, 5.6% from 18 to 24, 25.9% from 25 to 44, 29.7% from 45 to 64, and 14.1% who were 65 years of age or older. The median age was 42 years. For every 100 females, there were 106.6 males. For every 100 females age 18 and over, there were 102.3 males.

The median income for a household in the township was $50,455, and the median income for a family was $55,833. Males had a median income of $37,656 versus $29,792 for females. The per capita income for the township was $19,519. About 0.9% of families and 1.8% of the population were below the poverty line, including none of those under age 18 and 8.3% of those age 65 or over.

== Nicolville ==
Nicolville is an unincorporated area on the southern border with Windom Township. It is located along Mower County Highway 46 (Old U.S. Route 16) about a mile north and east of Austin. At one time it had a gas/mechanic station, grocery store and possibly a hotel too.

=== Cemeteries ===
- Tanner Cemetery is located in the southeast corner of the southwest quadrant of section 12 of the township. It was used as a burial ground from 1861 to 1925. It is a private cemetery not open to the public.
- Greenwood Cemetery is located in the far southeast corner of the southeast quadrant of section 16 of the township. Its oldest known burial dates to 1863.
- Brown Cemetery (formerly called Oak Park Cemetery) is in Brownsdale in section 9 of the township. It is on the corner of Malissa St. and Cedar Ave. Its oldest known burial was prior to 1876.
