= Prairieland Transit System =

Provider of mass transportation in Nobles County, Minnesota

- Headquarters: 1106 3rd Avenue
- Locale: Worthington, Minnesota
- Service area: Nobles County, Minnesota
- Service type: Bus service, paratransit
- Routes: 1
- Fleet: 1 bus
- Annual ridership: 25,084 (2019)
- Website: Prairieland Transit System

Prairieland Transit System is a service of the Southwestern Minnesota Opportunity Council and the primary provider of mass transportation in Worthington, Minnesota. Operations include the fixed-route Worthington City Bus, the intercity Nobles County Heartland Express, and demand-response services across Nobles County. As of 2019, the system provided 25,084 rides over 11,350 annual vehicle revenue hours with 1 buses and 2 paratransit vehicles.

== History ==
The Worthington City Bus began operations on January 28, 2019, with nine stops. The service was intended to alleviate the burden on the local taxi service for the most common trips in the city.

== Service ==
Prairieland Transit System operates the Worthington City Bus, a weekday fixed-route bus within Worthington. This service is complemented by demand-response service throughout Nobles County and the Nobles County Heartland Express, which operates from Worthington to nearby communities Monday through Thursday.

Hours of operation for the Worthington City Bus are Monday through Friday from 8:00 A.M. to 4:00 P.M. There is no service on Saturdays and Sundays. Regular fares are $1.00.

== Fixed route ridership ==
The ridership statistics shown here are of fixed route services only and do not include demand response services.

== See also ==
- List of bus transit systems in the United States
