= Oakland, Minnesota =

Unincorporated community in Minnesota, United States

Oakland
- Unincorporated community
- Location within Minnesota Location within the United States
- Coordinates: 43°40′26″N 93°05′20″W
- Country: United States
- State: Minnesota
- County: Freeborn
- Elevation: 1,270 ft (390 m)
- Time zone: UTC-6 (Central (CST))
  - Summer (DST): UTC-5 (CDT)
- Area code: 507
- GNIS feature ID: 648867

Oakland is an unincorporated community in Oakland Township, Freeborn County, Minnesota, United States, near Albert Lea and Austin. It is along Interstate 90, County Road 46, and County Road 34 / 890th Avenue.

== Climate ==
This area has a continental climate which is typified by large seasonal temperature differences, with warm to hot (and often humid) summers and cold (sometimes severely cold) winters. The Köppen Climate Classification subtype for this climate is "Dfa" (Hot Summer Continental Climate).

Climate data for Oakland, Minnesota
Month	Jan	Feb	Mar	Apr	May	Jun	Jul	Aug	Sep	Oct	Nov	Dec	Year
Mean daily maximum °C (°F)	−5 (23)	−2 (28)	4 (40)	14 (57)	21 (70)	26 (79)	28 (83)	27 (81)	23 (73)	16 (61)	6 (42)	−2 (28)	13 (55)
Mean daily minimum °C (°F)	−16 (4)	−13 (9)	−6 (22)	1 (34)	8 (46)	13 (56)	16 (60)	14 (57)	9 (49)	3 (38)	−4 (24)	−12 (11)	1 (34)
Average precipitation mm (inches)	23 (0.9)	20 (0.8)	46 (1.8)	74 (2.9)	110 (4.2)	110 (4.5)	110 (4.2)	100 (4)	86 (3.4)	53 (2.1)	41 (1.6)	30 (1.2)	800 (31.5)
Average precipitation days	5	4	7	9	12	11	10	9	9	7	6	6	95
Source: Weatherbase
