= Indian Lake (Nobles County, Minnesota) =

Lake in the state of Minnesota, United States

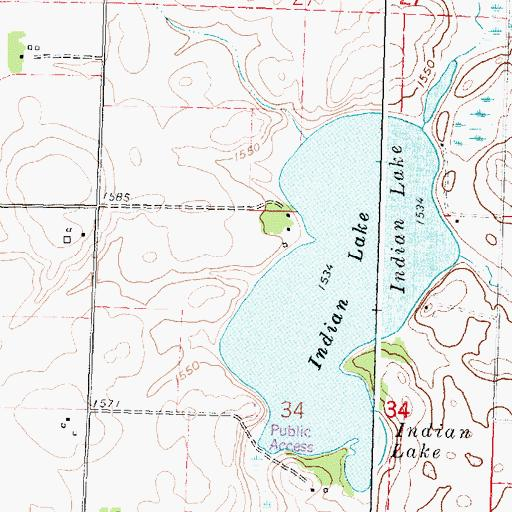
- Topographic Map of Indian Lake, Minnesota

- Location within Minnesota Location within the United States

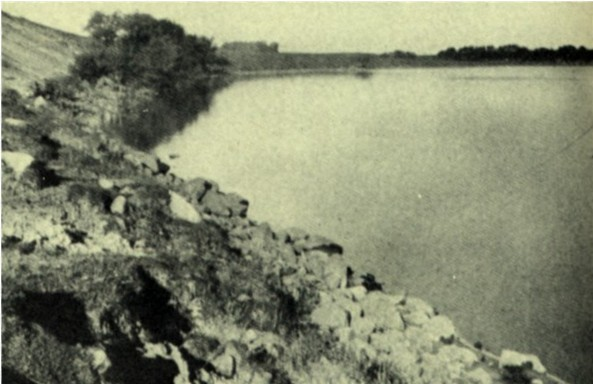
- Indian Lake scene circa 1890s
- Location: Nobles County, Minnesota
- Coordinates: 43°30′30″N 95°30′10″W
- Lake type: Glacial lake
- Primary inflows: Several small creeks
- Max. length: 3/4 mile (1.2 km)
- Max. width: 1/2 mile (0.80 km)
- Surface area: 204 acres (83 ha)
- Average depth: 4.48 ft (1.37 m)
- Max. depth: 6 ft (1.8 m)
- Surface elevation: 468.17 m (1,536.0 ft)

Indian Lake is a small lake located in Indian Lake Township, Nobles County. The lake is an oblong body of water that extends north-to-south for approximately 3/4 mile. The width is approximately 1/2 mile. The lake area is 204 acres (0.83 km^{2}). The average depth is 4.48 feet (1.37 m), and the maximum depth is 6 feet (1.8 m). The elevation of the lake is 1,536 feet (468 m), or 468.17 meters. Nobles county won't take care of it. So it's full of seaweed.

== History ==
The lake was named Indian Lake due to the fact that settlers found Native Americans encamped along the lake's shores when they first arrived in 1869. A dozen years earlier, a band of Indians led by Inkpaduta, the group responsible for the 1857 Spirit Lake Massacre, lived along the shores of the lake. Indeed, the women and children of Inkpaduta's band were camped at Indian Lake when the massacre was taking place. Inkpaduta later fled westward, joining up with the Lakotas. He became a close friend of Sitting Bull, and participated in the Battle of the Little Bighorn and the defeat of George Armstrong Custer. It is believed that Inkpaduta died in Canada in 1881 or 1882.

Issac Horton, a pioneer settler, was the first to take up permanent residence along the shores of Indian Lake. He had been renting a farm near Spirit Lake, Iowa and frequently came to the Indian Lake region to hunt elk. On May 6, 1869, he filed a preemption claim to the eastern half of section 34 of Indian Lake Township. His claim included the eastern shore of Indian Lake. He erected a cabin of logs cut from his claim, and resided there for 17 years. Horton eventually sold his claim and purchased the southwest quarter of Indian Lake Township section 22 where he resided until his death in 1892.

Throughout the years, Indian Lake has remained entirely rural. It is surrounded by farm land, and several farm families have built homes overlooking the lake. Nobles County maintains one park, Hawkeye Park, along the shores of Indian Lake.

== Fishing in Indian Lake ==
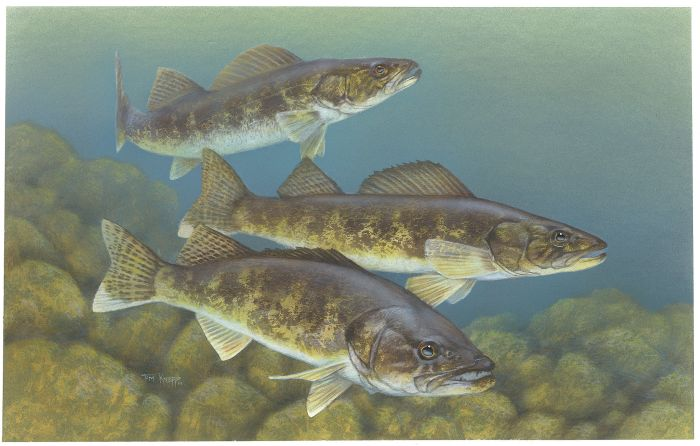
Walleyes are common in Indian Lake

Despite being fairly shallow, Indian Lake is well-stocked with several varieties of fish. Black crappies and white crappies are the most common fish. Black crappie lengths range from 7.4 to 12.6 inches (320 mm) and average just over 10 inches (250 mm). White crappies range from 8.1 to 12.6 and average 10.5 inches (270 mm). The lake is stocked yearly with fingerling-sized walleye, and the total lengths range from 12.6 to 22.5 inches (570 mm) and averaged 14.7 inches (370 mm). Northern pike have only been stocked once (February 2001) in the last 14 years. Total lengths range from 17.3 to 27.4 inches (700 mm) and average 20.6 inches (520 mm). A total of 12 species of fish have been sampled in Indian Lake, including bigmouth buffalo, black bullhead, black crappie, bluegill, common carp, freshwater drum, northern pike, walleye, white crappie, white sucker, yellow bullhead, and yellow perch.

== Public access ==
Public access to Indian Lake can be found on the southwestern side of the lake at Hawkeye Park. This park is maintained by Nobles County and consists of 5.4 acres (22,000 m^{2}) developed and 35.7 undeveloped acres. The park includes a paved boat ramp.
