= Lorain Township, Nobles County, Minnesota =

Lorain Township, Minnesota
- Township
- Location within the state of Minnesota Lorain Township, Minnesota (the United States)
- Coordinates: 43°38′33″N 95°30′49″W
- Country: United States
- State: Minnesota
- County: Nobles

Area
  - Total: 35.1 sq mi (90.9 km^{2})
  - Land: 34.8 sq mi (90.2 km^{2})
  - Water: 0.27 sq mi (0.7 km^{2})
- Elevation: 1,532 ft (467 m)

Population (2000)
  - Total: 278
  - Density: 8.0/sq mi (3.1/km^{2})
- Time zone: UTC-6 (Central (CST))
  - Summer (DST): UTC-5 (CDT)
- FIPS code: 27-38204
- GNIS feature ID: 0664825

Lorain Township is a township in Nobles County, Minnesota, United States. The population was 278 at the 2000 census.

== Geography ==
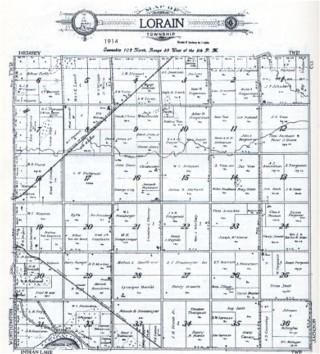
Map of Lorain Township - 1914

According to the United States Census Bureau, the township has a total area of 35.1 square miles (90.9 km^{2}), of which 34.8 square miles (90.2 km^{2}) is land and 0.3 square mile (0.8 km^{2}) (0.83%) is water. The main geographic feature of Lorain Township is the Okabena Creek which bisects the township from east to west. The northern portion of East Lake Ocheda is also found within Lorain Township.

Main highways include:

- Interstate 90
- Minnesota State Highway 264
- Nobles County Road 1
- Nobles County Road 3
- Nobles County Road 5
- Nobles County Road 35
- Nobles County Road 36

== History ==
Organization of Lorain Township was approved by the Nobles County Board on September 3, 1872. The township was originally christened Fairview Township, and that name was used for nearly two years until the state auditor notified county officials that another Fairview Township existed elsewhere in the state (although two Fairview Townships currently exist within Minnesota). On July 5, 1874, the township was renamed Lorain Township after Loraine, Illinois. The change in spelling was made to differentiate the township from Loraine, Illinois.

== Demographics ==
As of the census of 2000, there were 278 people, 111 households, and 89 families residing in the township. The population density was 8.0 inhabitants per square mile (3.1/km^{2}). There were 117 housing units at an average density of 3.4 per square mile (1.3/km^{2}). The racial makeup of the township was 99.64% White and 0.36% Native American. Hispanic or Latino of any race were 0.36% of the population.

There were 111 households, out of which 24.3% had children under the age of 18 living with them, 74.8% were married couples living together, 2.7% had a female householder with no husband present, and 19.8% were non-families. 18.9% of all households were made up of individuals, and 6.3% had someone living alone who was 65 years of age or older. The average household size was 2.50 and the average family size was 2.85.

In the township the population was spread out, with 20.1% under the age of 18, 8.3% from 18 to 24, 21.9% from 25 to 44, 32.7% from 45 to 64, and 16.9% who were 65 years of age or older. The median age was 44 years. For every 100 females, there were 102.9 males. For every 100 females age 18 and over, there were 105.6 males.

The median income for a household in the township was $39,821, and the median income for a family was $45,417. Males had a median income of $30,000 versus $18,125 for females. The per capita income for the township was $17,109. About 4.8% of families and 7.2% of the population were below the poverty line, including 5.5% of those under the age of eighteen and 10.9% of those 65 or over.

== Politics ==
Lorain Township is located in Minnesota's 1st congressional district, represented by Republican Brad Finstad. At the state level, Lorain Township is located in Senate District 21, represented by Republican Bill Weber, and in House District 21B, represented by Republican Marj Fogelman.

== Local politics ==
Lorain Township is represented by Nobles County Commissioner Gene Metz.
