= Pipestone Area High School =

Coordinates: 43°59′53.17″N 96°20′22.98″W

Location
- 1401 7th St SW; Pipestone, Minnesota 56164; United States

Information
- Type: Public
- Established: 1897
- Principal: Sonja Ortman
- Teaching staff: 19.90 (FTE)
- Grades: 9–12
- Enrollment: 320 (2023-2024)
- Student to teacher ratio: 16.08
- Mascot: Arrow
- Colors: Green, White, and Black
- Website: www.pas.k12.mn.us

Pipestone Area High School is the only public high school in Pipestone, Minnesota, United States. The high school is part of the Pipestone Area School District, Independent School District #2689. As of August 2017, there were 324 students enrolled in grades 9–12. A new 197,000-square-foot (18,300 m^{2}) facility, which houses grades 5–12 and the school district administration, was opened in January 2003 at the cost of $22.3 million. The campus is located on Minnesota State Highway 30 on the west end of Pipestone.

== Academics ==
Pipestone Area High School does not require the study of a foreign language, although it is highly recommended. Current languages offered are French and Spanish. PAHS also offers a variety of Advanced Placement classes, including AP Calculus, AP Chemistry and AP English Language and Composition. An accelerated math program is offered to selected students, starting in tenth grade. Other classes offered (some required), aside from the general core classes, are technology education, government, sociology, keyboarding, economics, family and consumer science (FACS), agriculture, art, band, choir. PSEO classes can be taken by qualifying students at Minnesota West Community & Technical College, which has a campus in Pipestone.

== Extracurricular activities ==
All students are offered their choice of extracurricular activities, if they choose to participate. Academic extracurricular activities of notable mention include Math Team, Knowledge Bowl, Marching band, Student Council, Peer Helping, One Act Play, Drama, Speech, FFA, among others.

== Board of education ==
The Board of Education is made up of seven people residing within the school district elected by the voters to make major decisions, including financial decisions, personnel authorizations and educational policy.

== Athletics ==
In 2007, the Pipestone Area girls' basketball team defeated the Albany Huskies, 50-49, at the Target Center in Minneapolis, Minnesota, to win its first Minnesota State High School League state championship in school history.

Pipestone Area participates in The Big South Conference.

=== Football ===
Each year, the Pipestone Area football team plays nearby Luverne in a rivalry dating back to 1957. The winner of the annual game receives a traveling trophy known as the 'Battle Ax'.

==== Results ====
Year	Score	Winner
1958	20-7	Luverne
1959	26-13	Luverne
1960	33-0	Luverne
1961	13-6	Pipestone
1962	21-6	Pipestone
1963	31-7	Luverne
1964	36-13	Luverne
1965	13-12	Pipestone
1966	14-12	Luverne
1967	34-0	Luverne
1968	33-26	Luverne
1969	27-6	Pipestone
1970	20-0	Pipestone
1971	23-8	Pipestone
1972	28-13	Luverne
1973	33-16	Luverne
1974	12-0	Pipestone
1975	21-8	Pipestone
1976	21-6	Pipestone
1977	48-7	Pipestone
1978	18-7	Pipestone
1979	34-14	Pipestone
1980	34-8	Pipestone
1981	28-6	Pipestone
1982	20-0	Pipestone
1983	13-6	Pipestone
1984	18-14	Pipestone
1985	6-0	Luverne
1986	14-12	Luverne
1987	26-8	Luverne
1988	34-6	Luverne
1989	8-0	Pipestone
1990	13-6	Pipestone
1991	28-6	Luverne
1992	27-7	Luverne
1993	22-19	Luverne
1994	25-6	Luverne
1995	12-7	Luverne
1996	7-0	Pipestone-Jasper
1997	22-20	Pipestone-Jasper
1998	37-6	Luverne
1999	9-7	Pipestone-Jasper
2000	28-14	Luverne
2001	34-14	Luverne
2002	21-7	Pipestone Area
2003	14-7	Luverne
2004	19-12	Luverne
2005	24-6	Luverne
2006	10-7	Luverne
2007	41-13	Luverne
2009	17-14	Luverne
2010	7-0	Luverne
2011	35-6	Luverne
2012	28-7	Luverne
2013	22-21	Pipestone Area
2014	18-16	Pipestone Area
2015	21-6	Pipestone Area
2016	23-6	Luverne
2017	14-0	Pipestone Area
2018	33-12	Pipestone Area
2019	13-12	Luverne

=== Team sports ===
Sport	Team State Appearances (Final place)
Baseball	1961, 1969, 1977 (3rd), 2005 (2nd), 2006, 2007 (4th), 2008 (6th), 2024 (1st)
Basketball (boys)	1919, 1924, 1989 (5th), 2003
Basketball (girls)	1987 (3rd), 2005, 2007 (1st), 2009, 2010 (4th)
Cross Country Running (boys)	1966 (20th)
Cross Country Running (girls)	None
Football	1977, 1980 (2nd), 2014, 2015 (2nd), 2017 (2nd), 2023 (1st)
Golf (boys)	1982 (4th), 1988 (4th)
Golf (girls)	1982 (5th), 1983 (4th)
Gymnastics (girls)	None
Softball (girls)	2001 (6th), 2003 (2nd), 2006, 2007 (1st), 2008 (2nd), 2009 (3rd), 2010 (6th), 2011 (4th), 2016 (5th), 2017 (5th), 2018 (3rd), 2019 (3rd), 2021 (4th), 2022 (6th)
Tennis (boys)	1975, 2003
Tennis (girls)	None
Track and Field (boys)	N/A
Track and Field (girls)	N/A
Volleyball (girls)	1977 (6th), 1979 (3rd), 2005 (5th), 2006 (3rd), 2022 (6th)
