= Worthington Senior High School =

Location
- 1211 Clary Street; Worthington, Minnesota 56187; United States; 43°37′41″N 95°35′48″W

Information
- Type: Public
- Principal: Tony Hastings
- Teaching staff: 68.62 (FTE)
- Grades: 9–12
- Enrollment: 1,123 (2023-2024)
- Student to teacher ratio: 16.37
- Colors: Red and Black
- Nickname: Trojans
- Website: www.isd518.net/schools/whs/

Worthington Senior High School is a public high school in Worthington, Minnesota, United States, in the southwest corner of the state. Worthington Senior High School is in Class AA of the Minnesota State High School League. The current campus is located on Clary Street, adjacent to the Independent School District #518 building on Marine Avenue.

== Academics ==
WHS also offers Advanced Placement classes, including AP Calculus, AP Biology and AP Psychology. Honors and College Bound classes are offered in the core areas of the curriculum, and students in their junior and senior years are able to enroll in Post Secondary Enrollment Options (PSEO) courses at Minnesota West Community and Technical College.

== Athletics ==
Worthington Trojans athletic teams include baseball, basketball, cheerleading, cross country, football, golf, gymnastics, hockey, soccer, softball, tennis, track and field, volleyball, and wrestling. Worthington High School is a member of the Big South Conference.

== Notable alumni ==
- Wendell Butcher, NFL football player
- Matt Entenza, former minority leader of the Minnesota House of Representatives (2002–2006) and a 2010 Minnesota Democratic-Farmer-Labor Party candidate for governor of Minnesota
- Don Frerichs, businessman and Minnesota state representative
- Peter Ludlow, analytic philosopher
- Lee Nystrom, NFL football player
- Tim O'Brien, author of The Things They Carried
