= Beaver Creek, Minnesota =

City in Minnesota, United States

Beaver Creek
- City
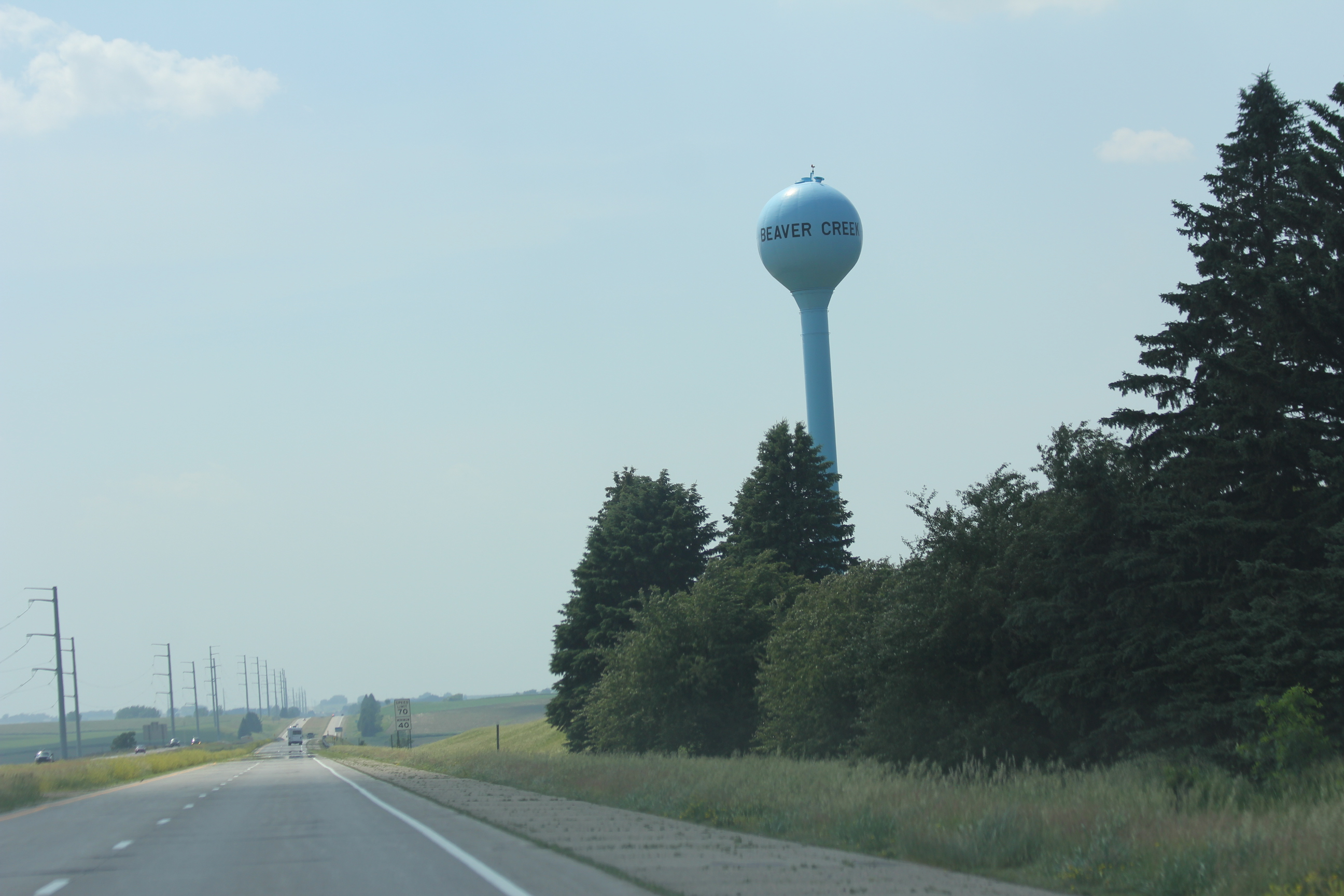
- Beaver Creek water tower on I90

- Location of Beaver Creek, Minnesota
- Coordinates: 43°36′45″N 96°21′45″W
- Country: United States
- State: Minnesota
- County: Rock

Government
  - Type: Mayor - Council
  - Mayor: Josh Teune

Area
  - Total: 0.53 sq mi (1.37 km^{2})
  - Land: 0.53 sq mi (1.37 km^{2})
  - Water: 0 sq mi (0.00 km^{2})
- Elevation: 1,480 ft (450 m)

Population (2020)
  - Total: 280
  - Density: 529.5/sq mi (204.45/km^{2})
- Time zone: UTC-6 (Central (CST))
  - Summer (DST): UTC-5 (CDT)
- ZIP code: 56116
- Area code: 507
- FIPS code: 27-04492
- GNIS feature ID: 2394101

Beaver Creek is a city in Rock County, Minnesota, United States. The town was platted in 1877 and named for the large number of beavers which were caught along the nearby creek throughout the late 1800s. As of the 2020 census, the population was 280.

== History ==
A post office called Beaver Creek has been in operation since 1873. Beaver Creek was platted in 1877. The city took its name from nearby Beaver Creek. Beaver Creek was incorporated in 1884.

== Geography ==
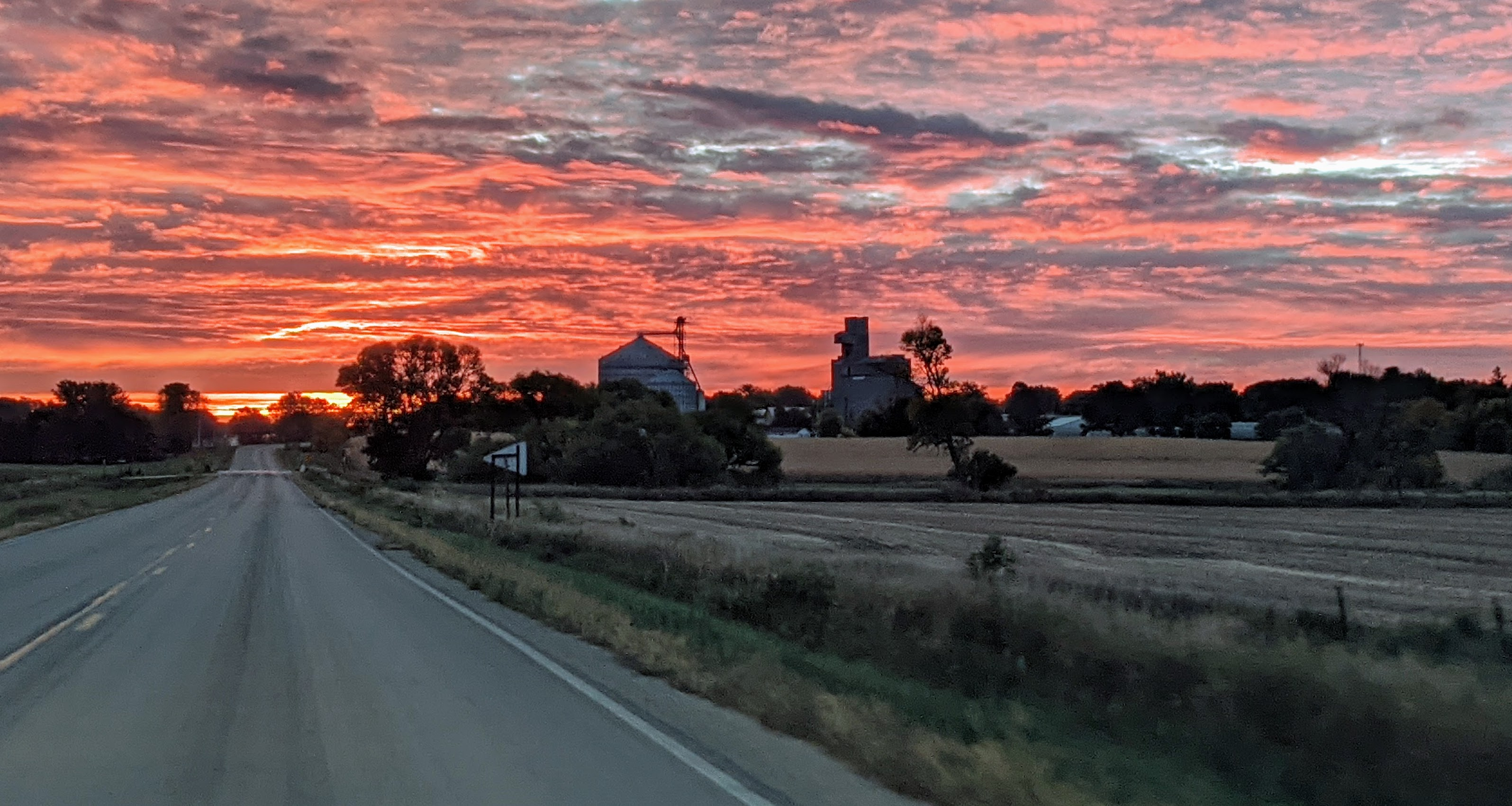
A view of Beaver Creek and its grain elevators.

According to the United States Census Bureau, the city has a total area of 0.50 square miles (1.29 km^{2}), all land. Interstate 90 serves as a main route in the community, and Minnesota State Highway 23 is nearby, three miles to the west.

== Demographics ==
Historical population
Census	Pop.	Note	%±
1880	37		—
1890	232		527.0%
1900	186		−19.8%
1910	195		4.8%
1920	217		11.3%
1930	324		49.3%
1940	254		−21.6%
1950	245		−3.5%
1960	250		2.0%
1970	235		−6.0%
1980	260		10.6%
1990	249		−4.2%
2000	250		0.4%
2010	297		18.8%
2020	280		−5.7%
U.S. Decennial Census

=== 2010 census ===
As of the census of 2010, there were 297 people, 117 households, and 86 families residing in the city. The population density was 594.0 inhabitants per square mile (229.3/km^{2}). There were 122 housing units at an average density of 244.0 per square mile (94.2/km^{2}). The racial makeup of the city was 97.0% White, 1.0% African American, 0.3% Native American, and 1.7% from other races. Hispanic or Latino of any race were 1.3% of the population.

There were 117 households, of which 31.6% had children under the age of 18 living with them, 65.8% were married couples living together, 4.3% had a female householder with no husband present, 3.4% had a male householder with no wife present, and 26.5% were non-families. 20.5% of all households were made up of individuals, and 8.6% had someone living alone who was 65 years of age or older. The average household size was 2.54 and the average family size was 2.92.

The median age in the city was 36.9 years. 24.6% of residents were under the age of 18; 8.4% were between the ages of 18 and 24; 24.6% were from 25 to 44; 30.7% were from 45 to 64; and 11.8% were 65 years of age or older. The gender makeup of the city was 53.5% male and 46.5% female.

=== 2000 census ===
As of the census of 2000, there were 250 people, 106 households, and 78 families residing in the city. The population density was 505.5 inhabitants per square mile (195.2/km^{2}). There were 112 housing units at an average density of 226.5 per square mile (87.5/km^{2}). The racial makeup of the city was 98.80% White, and 1.20% from two or more races.

There were 106 households, out of which 26.4% had children under the age of 18 living with them, 62.3% were married couples living together, 8.5% had a female householder with no husband present, and 26.4% were non-families. 26.4% of all households were made up of individuals, and 17.0% had someone living alone who was 65 years of age or older. The average household size was 2.36 and the average family size was 2.82.

In the city, the population was spread out, with 20.4% under the age of 18, 14.0% from 18 to 24, 21.2% from 25 to 44, 25.6% from 45 to 64, and 18.8% who were 65 years of age or older. The median age was 42 years. For every 100 females, there were 92.3 males. For every 100 females age 18 and over, there were 84.3 males.

The median income for a household in the city was $34,167, and the median income for a family was $39,583. Males had a median income of $23,036 versus $22,426 for females. The per capita income for the city was $14,924. About 6.7% of families and 7.8% of the population were below the poverty line, including none of those under the age of eighteen and 30.6% of those 65 or over.

== Politics ==
Beaver Creek is located in Minnesota's 1st congressional district, represented by Brad Finstad. At the state level, Beaver Creek is located in Senate District 22, represented by Bill Weber, and in House District 22A, represented by Joe Schomacker.
