= Wendell Butcher =

American football player (1914–1988)

No. 66
- Position: Back

Personal information
- Born: March 28, 1914; Worthington, Minnesota, U.S.
- Died: December 18, 1988 (aged 74); Memphis, Tennessee, U.S.
- Listed height: 6 ft 1 in (1.85 m)
- Listed weight: 197 lb (89 kg)

Career information
- High school: Worthington
- College: Gustavus Adolphus
- NFL draft: 1938: undrafted

Career history
- Brooklyn Dodgers (1938–1942)
- Stats at Pro Football Reference

Wendell Ralph Butcher (March 28, 1914 – December 18, 1988) was an American professional football player who was a back for five seasons with the Brooklyn Dodgers of the National Football League (NFL). He played college football for the Gustavus Adolphus Golden Gusties.

== Early life ==
Butcher lettered three years in football, two years in basketball and two years in track at attended Worthington High School in Worthington, Minnesota. He graduated in 1932. He was inducted into the Worthington High School Athletic Hall of Fame.

== College career ==
Butcher played at Gustavus Adolphus College for the Golden Gusties. He lettered one year as a halfback and three as a fullback. He helped the Gusties to three straight State Championships while the team won the conference all four years he played for them. Butcher was the leading scorer, rusher and passer in the conference during his junior and senior seasons. He earned All-State honors three times and was named a Little All-American in 1937. He was nicknamed the "Worthington Walloper" during his time at Gustavus Adolphus. Butcher also participated in basketball and track for the Gusties. He graduated in 1938. He was a charter member of the Gustavus Adolphus Athletics Hall of Fame in 1978.

== Professional career ==
Butcher signed with the NFL's Brooklyn Dodgers in 1938. He played in 44 games, starting 17, for the Dodgers from 1938 to 1942.

== Personal life ==
Butcher served in the United States Military during World War II. He worked at the family business, Thermopax, a heating equipment manufacturing company in Memphis, Tennessee, with his two sons. He retired in March 1979. Wendell's son, Ron Butcher, scored the first touchdown in the 1963 Rose Bowl.
