= Brownsdale Public Library =

Public library in Brownsdale, Minnesota

- 43°44′27.5″N 92°52′8″W
- Location: 103 E. Main St. Brownsdale MN 55918

Other information
- Director: Debara Smith
- Website: https://brownsdale.lib.mn.us/

The Brownsdale Public Library is a public library in Brownsdale, Minnesota, United States. It is a member of Southeastern Libraries Cooperating, the Southeast Minnesota library region.
