= Wayne R. Bassett Sr. =

American librarian and politician (1915–1988)

Wayne Randolph Bassett Sr. (May 3, 1915 – March 11, 1988) was an American librarian and politician.

Bassett was born, on a farm, in Rushmore, Nobles County, Minnesota. He served in the United States Army, in Europe, during World War II. Bassett received his two bachelor's degrees in library administration and political science from University of Minnesota. He lived in Worthington, Minnesota with his wife and family and served as the director and librarian of the Nobles County Library. Bassett served on the Minnesota State Board of Education and on the Minnesota Historical Society Board. He served in the Minnesota House of Representatives in 1955 and 1956 and from 1959 to 1964. Bassett was a Democrat. In 1964, Bassett moved to Wausau, Wisconsin and served as the head librarian of the Marathon County Library from 1964 until his retirement in 1984. He also helped organized the Wisconsin Valley Library Service for ten counties in Wisconsin. Bassett died at his home in Wausau, Wisconsin.
