= Francis G. Judge =

American electrician, businessman, and politician

Francis G. Judge (April 4, 1908 – June 27, 1994) was an American electrician, businessman, and politician.

Judge was born in Cannon Falls, Goodhue County, Minnesota. He graduated from high school and went to the Dunwoody College of Technology. He lived in Worthington, Minnesota with his wife and family and worked as an electrician for Worthington Electric Company. Judge served on the Minnesota State Board of Electricity from 1959 to 1967 and was its president. He served in the Minnesota House of Representatives from 1969 to 1972 and was a Democrat. Judge died at Presbyterian Homes in Arden Hills, Minnesota.
