= Elkton, Minnesota =

City in Minnesota, United States

- City
- Location in Mower County and the state of Minnesota
- Coordinates: 43°39′37″N 92°42′23″W
- Country: United States
- State: Minnesota
- County: Mower
- Platted: January 25, 1887
- Incorporated: February 6, 1906

Government
  - Mayor: James Crozier

Area
  - Total: 1.281 sq mi (3.318 km^{2})
  - Land: 1.281 sq mi (3.318 km^{2})
  - Water: 0 sq mi (0.000 km^{2})
- Elevation: 1,381 ft (421 m)

Population (2020)
  - Total: 130
  - Estimate (2022): 133
  - Density: 103.8/sq mi (40.1/km^{2})
- Time zone: UTC–6 (Central (CST))
  - Summer (DST): UTC–5 (CDT)
- ZIP Code: 55933
- Area code: 507
- FIPS code: 27-18728
- GNIS feature ID: 2394660
- Sales tax: 7.375%

Elkton is a city in Marshall Township, Mower County, Minnesota, United States. The population was 130 at the 2020 census.

== History ==
Elkton was platted on January 25, 1887, by W.E. Richardson and Frank A. Day. It was incorporated on January 2, 1906. On January 30, 1906, the people of the township elected a president of the city council, three councilmen, a recorder, a treasurer, two justices of the peace, two constables and an assessor. A sidewalk was constructed on Main Street in 1908, electricity was brought in the late 1920s, and the water system was built in 1946. Curbs, gutters and new streets were added in 1965.

== Geography ==
Elkton is in central Mower County, 15 miles (24 km) east of Austin, the county seat. It is bordered to the south, east, and west by Marshall Township and to the north by Dexter Township.

According to the U.S. Census Bureau, Elkton has a total area of 1.281 square miles (3.32 km^{2}), all land. The city is drained by Schwerin Creek, which flows northwest to Rose Creek, a tributary of the Cedar River.

== Demographics ==
Historical population
Census	Pop.	Note	%±
1910	86		—
1920	102		18.6%
1930	91		−10.8%
1940	117		28.6%
1950	141		20.5%
1960	147		4.3%
1970	134		−8.8%
1980	139		3.7%
1990	142		2.2%
2000	149		4.9%
2010	141		−5.4%
2020	130		−7.8%
2022 (est.)	133		2.3%
U.S. Decennial Census; 2020 Census

=== 2010 census ===
As of the 2010 census, there were 141 people, 58 households, and 40 families living in the city. The population density was 108.5 inhabitants per square mile (41.9/km^{2}). There were 59 housing units at an average density of 45.4 per square mile (17.5/km^{2}). The racial makeup of the city was 93.6% White, 0.7% Pacific Islander, 1.4% from other races, and 4.3% from two or more races. Hispanic or Latino of any race were 1.4% of the population.

There were 58 households, of which 32.8% had children under the age of 18 living with them, 51.7% were married couples living together, 15.5% had a female householder with no husband present, 1.7% had a male householder with no wife present, and 31.0% were non-families. 27.6% of all households were made up of individuals, and 12% had someone living alone who was 65 years of age or older. The average household size was 2.43 and the average family size was 3.00.

The median age in the city was 40.8 years. 29.8% of residents were under the age of 18; 5.6% were between the ages of 18 and 24; 22% were from 25 to 44; 28.4% were from 45 to 64; and 14.2% were 65 years of age or older. The gender makeup of the city was 47.5% male and 52.5% female.

=== 2000 census ===
As of the 2000 census, there were 149 people, 52 households, and 37 families living in the city. The population density was 113.7 inhabitants per square mile (43.9/km^{2}). There were 59 housing units at an average density of 45.0 per square mile (17.4/km^{2}). The racial makeup of the city was 99.33% White, and 0.67% from two or more races. Hispanic or Latino of any race were 4.03% of the population.

There were 52 households, out of which 40.4% had children under the age of 18 living with them, 63.5% were married couples living together, 1.9% had a female householder with no husband present, and 28.8% were non-families. 26.9% of all households were made up of individuals, and 15.4% had someone living alone who was 65 years of age or older. The average household size was 2.87 and the average family size was 3.54.

In the city, the population was spread out, with 35.6% under the age of 18, 6.0% from 18 to 24, 24.8% from 25 to 44, 22.1% from 45 to 64, and 11.4% who were 65 years of age or older. The median age was 30 years. For every 100 females, there were 112.9 males. For every 100 females age 18 and over, there were 104.3 males.

The median income for a household in the city was $32,813, and the median income for a family was $43,125. Males had a median income of $26,875 versus $29,688 for females. The per capita income for the city was $14,950. There were 2.9% of families and 5.8% of the population living below the poverty line, including 10.4% of under eighteens and none of those over 64.

== Notable people ==
- Alvin Baldus (1926–2017), U.S. representative from Wisconsin
