= Indian Lake Township, Nobles County, Minnesota =

Indian Lake Township, Minnesota
- Township
- Location within the state of Minnesota Indian Lake Township, Minnesota (the United States)
- Coordinates: 43°32′11″N 95°30′15″W
- Country: United States
- State: Minnesota
- County: Nobles

Area
  - Total: 34.9 sq mi (90.5 km^{2})
  - Land: 33.6 sq mi (87.1 km^{2})
  - Water: 1.3 sq mi (3.4 km^{2})
- Elevation: 1,568 ft (478 m)

Population (2000)
  - Total: 259
  - Density: 7.8/sq mi (3/km^{2})
- Time zone: UTC-6 (Central (CST))
  - Summer (DST): UTC-5 (CDT)
- FIPS code: 27-30878
- GNIS feature ID: 0664544

Indian Lake Township is a township in Nobles County, Minnesota, United States. The population was 259 at the 2000 census.

== Geography ==
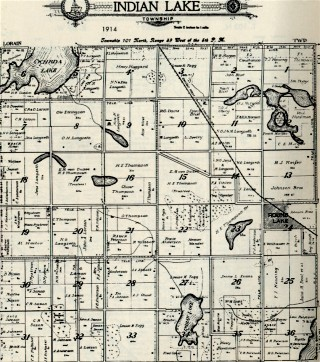
Map of Indian Lake Township - 1914

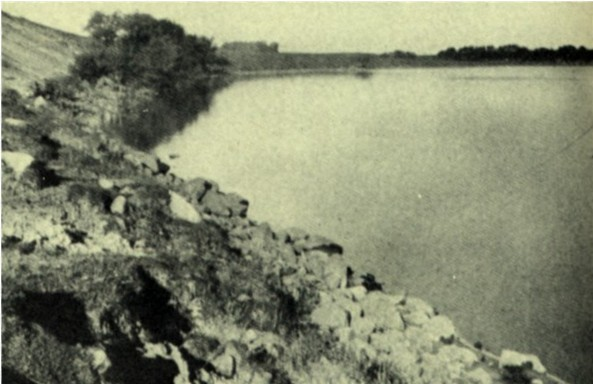
Indian Lake scene - 1890s

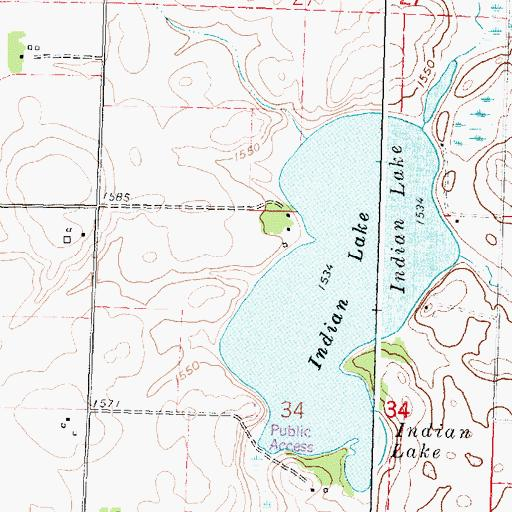
Topographic map if Indian Lake

According to the United States Census Bureau, the township has a total area of 34.9 square miles (90 km^{2}), of which 33.6 square miles (87 km^{2}) is land and 1.3 square miles (3.4 km^{2}) (3.75%) is water. The major geographic features in the township include Indian Lake much of East Lake Ocheda, and a small portion of Iowa Lake.

Main highways include:

- Minnesota State Highway 264
- Nobles County Road 3
- Nobles County Road 4
- Nobles County Road 5

== History ==
Organization of Indian Lake Township was approved by the Nobles County Board on April 22, 1871. The township was named for the lake within its borders. The lake was named Indian Lake due to the fact that settlers found Native Americans encamped along the lake's shores when they first arrived in 1869. A dozen years earlier, a band of Indians led by Inkpaduta, the group responsible for the 1857 Spirit Lake Massacre, lived along the shores of the lake. Indeed, the women and children of Inkpaduta's band were camped at Indian Lake when the massacre was taking place. Inkpaduta later fled westward, joining up with the Lakotas. He became a close friend of Sitting Bull, and participated in the Battle of the Little Bighorn and the defeat of George Armstrong Custer. It is believed that Inkpaduta died in Canada in 1881 or 1882.

Issac Horton, a pioneer settler, was the first to take up permanent residence along the shores of Indian Lake. He had been renting a farm near Spirit Lake, Iowa and frequently came to the Indian Lake region to hunt elk. On May 6, 1869, he filed a preemption claim to the eastern half of section 34 of Indian Lake Township. His claim included the eastern shore of Indian Lake. He erected a cabin of logs cut from his claim, and resided there for 17 years. Horton eventually sold his claim and purchased the southwest quarter of Indian Lake Township section 22 where he resided until his death in 1892.

Other early settlers in Indian Lake Township included Ole Fauskee and his family. Ole migrated from Norway to the United States in 1867 when he was 25 years old. He was travelling through southwest Minnesota with his brother when his ox team gave out. He liked the country he saw, and on June 8, 1870, he and his brother walked all the way to Jackson, Minnesota, to file claims. Ole Fauskee claimed the northwest quarter of section 6 of Indian Lake Township, and his brother made an adjacent claim. Fauskee erected a sod hut on the banks of East Lake Ocheda and lived there for five years. He also claimed the northeast quarter of section 12 of Bigelow Township. Fauskee eventually built a home of lumber there, and prospered as a farmer.

== Demographics ==
As of the census of 2000, there were 259 people, 94 households, and 78 families residing in the township. The population density was 7.7 inhabitants per square mile (3.0/km^{2}). There were 96 housing units at an average density of 2.9 per square mile (1.1/km^{2}). The racial makeup of the township was 99.61% White, 0.39% from other races. Hispanic or Latino of any race were 1.16% of the population.

There were 94 households, out of which 41.5% had children under the age of 18 living with them, 76.6% were married couples living together, 2.1% had a female householder with no husband present, and 16.0% were non-families. 14.9% of all households were made up of individuals, and 8.5% had someone living alone who was 65 years of age or older. The average household size was 2.76 and the average family size was 3.04.

In the township the population was spread out, with 29.3% under the age of 18, 5.8% from 18 to 24, 23.9% from 25 to 44, 28.2% from 45 to 64, and 12.7% who were 65 years of age or older. The median age was 41 years. For every 100 females, there were 110.6 males. For every 100 females age 18 and over, there were 101.1 males.

The median income for a household in the township was $48,542, and the median income for a family was $55,469. Males had a median income of $29,107 versus $18,594 for females. The per capita income for the township was $17,542. About 2.1% of families and 3.1% of the population were below the poverty line, including 5.6% of those under the age of eighteen and none of those 65 or over.

== Politics ==
Indian Lake Township is located in Minnesota's 1st congressional district, represented by Mankato educator Tim Walz, a Democrat. At the state level, Indian Lake Township is located in Senate District 22, represented by Republican Doug Magnus, and in House District 22B, represented by Republican Rod Hamilton.

== Local politics ==
Indian Lake township is represented by Nobles County Commissioner Marvin Zylstra
