= Guckeen, Minnesota =

Unincorporated community in Minnesota, United States

Guckeen
- Unincorporated community
- Location within Minnesota Location within the United States
- Coordinates: 43°39′05″N 94°13′30″W
- Country: United States
- State: Minnesota
- County: Faribault
- Elevation: 1,112 ft (339 m)
- Time zone: UTC-6 (Central (CST))
  - Summer (DST): UTC-5 (CDT)
- Area code: 507
- GNIS feature ID: 644521

Guckeen is an unincorporated community in Faribault County, in the U.S. state of Minnesota.

== History ==
Guckeen was originally called Derby, and under the latter name was laid out in 1900. A post office was established as Guckeen in 1901, and remained in operation until it was discontinued in 1973. The present name of Guckeen is the surname of an early settler.
