= Marshall Township, Mower County, Minnesota =

Marshall Township, Minnesota
- Township
- Location within the state of Minnesota Marshall Township, Minnesota (the United States)
- Coordinates: 43°37′58″N 92°45′23″W
- Country: United States
- State: Minnesota
- County: Mower

Area
  - Total: 34.6 sq mi (89.6 km^{2})
  - Land: 34.6 sq mi (89.6 km^{2})
  - Water: 0 sq mi (0.0 km^{2})
- Elevation: 1,329 ft (405 m)

Population (2000)
  - Total: 382
  - Density: 11/sq mi (4.3/km^{2})
- Time zone: UTC-6 (Central (CST))
  - Summer (DST): UTC-5 (CDT)
- FIPS code: 27-40706
- GNIS feature ID: 0664918
- Website: https://www.marshalltownship.net/

Marshall Township is a township in Mower County, Minnesota, United States. The population was 382 at the 2000 census. The largest town in the township is Elkton, which has a population of 149 people. All other areas in the township are unincorporated.

== History ==
The land of Marshall Township originally contained a few small, shallow lakes, but they have since been drained to allow for increased farming. Helge Erickson. a Norwegian, settled in the western half of the southwest quadrant of section 36 in 1856 and John Osmunsen (born Jone Hauske Osmundson), another Norwegian, came from Wisconsin and settled in the eastern half of the southeast quadrant of the same section the following year together with his wife Ellen Serena Osmundsen (born Vignes, Hansdatter / daughter of Hans and Siri Olsen Finnøy, Norway). The township was first named "York" and later "Beach" before finally being named for William Rainey Marshall in 1870. Marshall was the fifth Governor of Minnesota and he owned land in Marshall Township from 1868 to 1874. At the organizing meeting of June 6, 1870, the people of the township elected two supervisors, a chairman, a clerk, an assessor, a treasurer two justices of the peace and two constables.

== Geography ==
According to the United States Census Bureau, the township has a total area of 34.6 square miles (89.6 km^{2}), all land.

== Demographics ==
As of the census of 2000, there were 382 people, 122 households, and 105 families residing in the township. The population density was 11.0 inhabitants per square mile (4.2/km^{2}). There were 126 housing units at an average density of 3.6 per square mile (1.4/km^{2}). The racial makeup of the township was: two Native Americans, and two Asians, and the rest of the people are white. There were 122 households, out of which 44.3% had children under the age of 18 living with them, 76.2% were married couples living together, 3.3% had a female householder with no husband present, and 13.9% were non-families. 10.7% of all households were made up of individuals, and 3.3% had someone living alone who was 65 years of age or older. The average household size was 3.13 and the average family size was 3.38.

In the township the population was spread out, with 31.2% under the age of 18, 9.9% from 18 to 24, 25.7% from 25 to 44, 23.0% from 45 to 64, and 10.2% who were 65 years of age or older. The median age was 35 years. For every 100 females, there were 114.6 males. For every 100 females age 18 and over, there were 119.2 males.

The median income for a household in the township was $47,500, and the median income for a family was $50,536. Males had a median income of $28,750 versus $23,542 for females. The per capita income for the township was $16,322. About 2.0% of families and 3.3% of the population were below the poverty line, including 4.4% of those under age 18 and none of those age 65 or over.

== Cemeteries ==
- Hoflanda Cemetery is located in the southwest corner of the southwest quadrant of section 8 of the township. Its oldest known burial dates to 1883.
- St. John's Lutheran Cemetery is located in the northeast corner of the northeast quadrant of section 4 of the township. Its oldest known burial may date to as early as 1887.
