= Lee Nystrom =

American football player (born 1951)

No. 70
- Position: Center

Personal information
- Born: October 30, 1951 (age 75); Worthington, Minnesota, U.S.
- Listed height: 6 ft 5 in (1.96 m)
- Listed weight: 260 lb (118 kg)

Career information
- High school: Worthington
- College: Macalester
- NFL draft: 1973: undrafted

Career history
- Pittsburgh Steelers (1973)*; Green Bay Packers (1973*–1974)
- * Offseason or practice squad member only

Career NFL statistics
- Games played: 13
- Stats at Pro Football Reference

Lee Allen Nystrom (born October 30, 1951) is an American former professional football player who was a center in the National Football League (NFL). Nystrom was born on October 30, 1951, in Worthington, Minnesota, where he attended Worthington High School. After high school, he attended Macalester College where he played college football as an offensive lineman. During his time at Macalester, the team only won nine games over his four years.

Nystrom went undrafted in the 1973 NFL draft, although he signed a contract with the Pittsburgh Steelers as an undrafted free agent. Nystrom participated in the Steelers' preseason, including a victory against the Baltimore Colts. During the preseason, the Steelers also had him work on the defense. However, Nystrom was placed on the Steelers taxi squad prior to the start of the season. Later in the year, he was officially released, however the Steelers kept paying him with the hope of stashing him away from other teams. When the plan was revealed, the Steelers were fined $10,000 by the NFL and Nystrom signed with the Green Bay Packers. Nystrom did not play for the Packers in 1973, although he played in 13 games during the 1974 NFL season. Nystrom was later cut by the Packers prior to the 1975 NFL season.

After his football career, Nystrom worked for an insurance brokerage firm while also coaching football and baseball for eight years at his alma mater Macalester. In 1986, the college inducted him into their hall of fame in recognition of his time playing football and coaching.
