= Rose Creek, Minnesota =

City in Minnesota, United States

- City
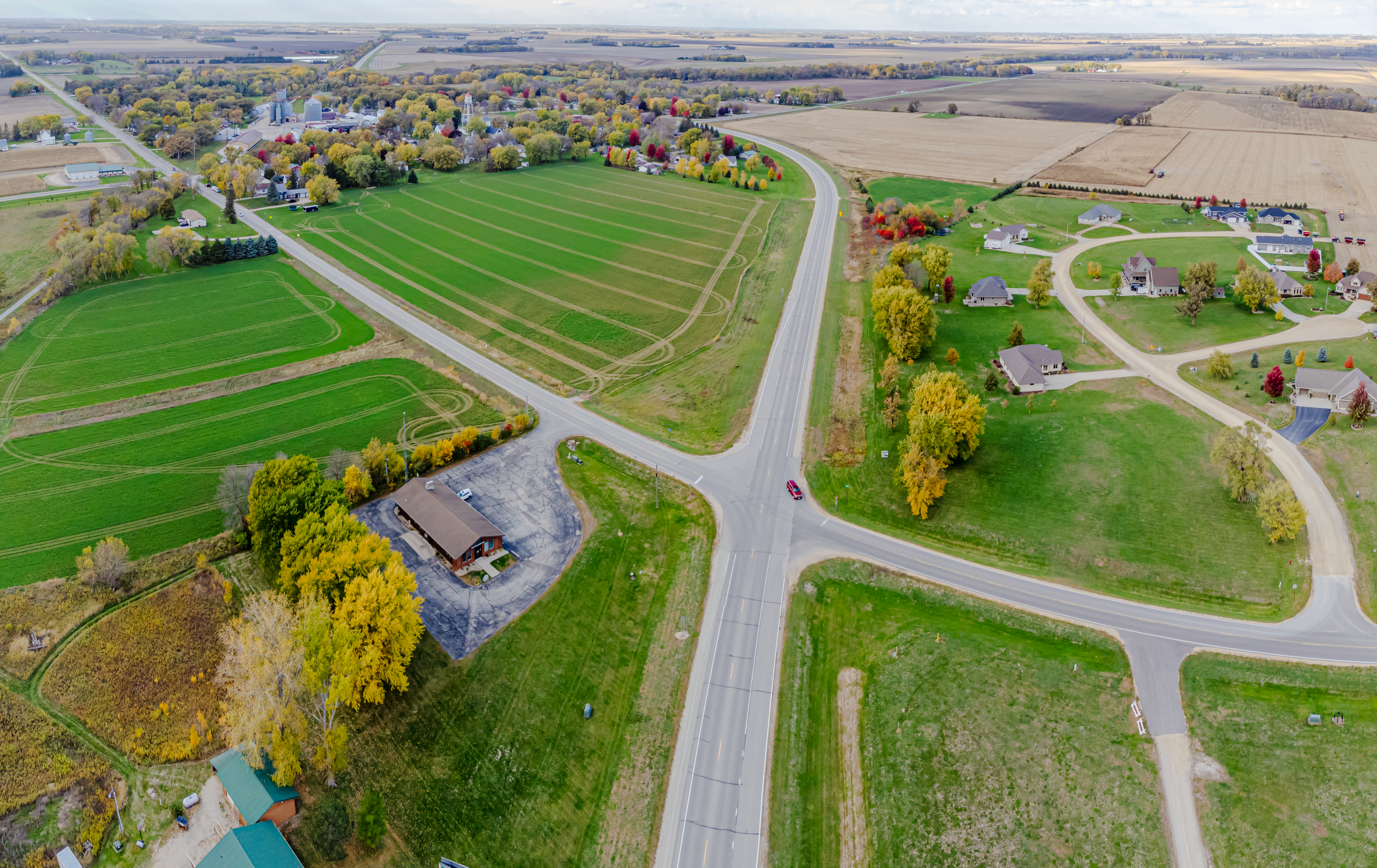
- MN-56 runs through Rose Creek.

- Location in Mower County and the state of Minnesota
- Coordinates: 43°36′16″N 92°49′44″W
- Country: United States
- State: Minnesota
- County: Mower

Area
  - Total: 0.49 sq mi (1.27 km^{2})
  - Land: 0.49 sq mi (1.27 km^{2})
  - Water: 0 sq mi (0.00 km^{2})
- Elevation: 1,263 ft (385 m)

Population (2020)
  - Total: 397
  - Density: 809.7/sq mi (312.61/km^{2})
- Time zone: UTC-6 (Central (CST))
  - Summer (DST): UTC-5 (CDT)
- ZIP Code: 55970
- Area code: 507
- FIPS code: 27-55600
- GNIS feature ID: 2396427
- Website: https://rosecreek.municipalimpact.com/

Rose Creek is a city in Mower County, Minnesota, United States. The population was 397 at the 2020 census.

== History ==
Rose Creek was laid out in 1868 when the railroad was extended to that point. The city was named for nearby Rose Creek. A post office was established at the community in 1868. Rose Creek was incorporated in 1899.

Todd Nelson, an 18-year-old high school senior from Rose Creek, devised an experiment on how weightlessness affected insects that was carried on board STS-3, the third launch of Space Shuttle Columbia, in March 1982.

== Geography ==
Rose Creek is in southwestern Mower County and is surrounded by Windom Township. Minnesota State Highway 56 passes through the north and east sides of the city, leading northwest 5 miles (8 km) to Interstate 90 and southeast 6 miles (10 km) to Adams. Austin, the Mower county seat, is 11 miles (18 km) to the northwest via MN 56 and I-90.

According to the U.S. Census Bureau, the city of Rose Creek has a total area of 0.49 square miles (1.27 km^{2}), all of it recorded as land. The stream named Rose Creek passes through the northwest corner of the city, flowing west toward the Cedar River, part of the Iowa River watershed.

== Demographics ==
Historical population
Census	Pop.	Note	%±
1900	204		—
1910	202		−1.0%
1920	208		3.0%
1930	210		1.0%
1940	261		24.3%
1950	314		20.3%
1960	351		11.8%
1970	390		11.1%
1980	371		−4.9%
1990	363		−2.2%
2000	354		−2.5%
2010	394		11.3%
2020	397		0.8%
U.S. Decennial Census

=== 2010 census ===
As of the census of 2010, there were 394 people, 162 households, and 111 families living in the city. The population density was 856.5 inhabitants per square mile (330.7/km^{2}). There were 167 housing units at an average density of 363.0 per square mile (140.2/km^{2}). The racial makeup of the city was 97.2% White, 0.3% Native American, 0.8% from other races, and 1.8% from two or more races. Hispanic or Latino of any race were 2.0% of the population.

There were 162 households, of which 32.7% had children under the age of 18 living with them, 55.6% were married couples living together, 8.6% had a female householder with no husband present, 4.3% had a male householder with no wife present, and 31.5% were non-families. 26.5% of all households were made up of individuals, and 12.3% had someone living alone who was 65 years of age or older. The average household size was 2.43 and the average family size was 2.96.

The median age in the city was 40 years. 28.4% of residents were under the age of 18; 6.3% were between the ages of 18 and 24; 21.6% were from 25 to 44; 27% were from 45 to 64; and 16.8% were 65 years of age or older. The gender makeup of the city was 48.5% male and 51.5% female.

=== 2000 census ===
As of the census of 2000, there were 354 people, 143 households, and 99 families living in the city. The population density was 773.4 inhabitants per square mile (298.6/km^{2}). There were 153 housing units at an average density of 334.3 per square mile (129.1/km^{2}). The racial makeup of the city was 100.00% White. Hispanic or Latino of any race were 0.85% of the population.

There were 143 households, out of which 32.2% had children under the age of 18 living with them, 61.5% were married couples living together, 4.9% had a female householder with no husband present, and 30.1% were non-families. 28.7% of all households were made up of individuals, and 19.6% had someone living alone who was 65 years of age or older. The average household size was 2.48 and the average family size was 3.03.

In the city, the population was spread out, with 26.0% under the age of 18, 8.5% from 18 to 24, 24.9% from 25 to 44, 18.1% from 45 to 64, and 22.6% who were 65 years of age or older. The median age was 39 years. For every 100 females, there were 97.8 males. For every 100 females age 18 and over, there were 88.5 males.

The median income for a household in the city was $42,841, and the median income for a family was $50,750. Males had a median income of $32,031 versus $22,321 for females. The per capita income for the city was $19,484. About 2.1% of families and 4.4% of the population were below the poverty line, including none of those under age 18 and 9.8% of those age 65 or over.
