= Windom Township, Mower County, Minnesota =

Windom Township, Minnesota
- Township
- Location within the state of Minnesota Windom Township, Minnesota (the United States)
- Coordinates: 43°37′58″N 92°51′38″W
- Country: United States
- State: Minnesota
- County: Mower

Area
  - Total: 36.0 sq mi (93.3 km^{2})
  - Land: 36.0 sq mi (93.3 km^{2})
  - Water: 0 sq mi (0.0 km^{2})
- Elevation: 1,237 ft (377 m)

Population (2000)
  - Total: 640
  - Density: 18/sq mi (6.9/km^{2})
- Time zone: UTC-6 (Central (CST))
  - Summer (DST): UTC-5 (CDT)
- FIPS code: 27-70816
- GNIS feature ID: 0666015

Windom Township is a township in Mower County, Minnesota, United States. The population was 640 at the 2000 census. The largest town in the township is Rose Creek with a population of 354 people. All other area in the township is unincorporated. After unsuccessfully trying two names, the township was named in honor of Senator William Windom of Winona.

== History ==
Sylvester Davis, the first settler in the township, came to section 20 in the spring of 1855 and built a more permanent dwelling later that fall. The township was officially organized in 1858 and called "Brooklyn." At the first meeting of the township, the people elected a chairman, two supervisors, a clerk, two justices of the peace, a collector, a constable an assessor, a road supervisor and an overseer of the poor. In 1862 the state legislature told the township to change its name because another town had prior claim to it. It was then briefly called Canton but the name had to be changed again for the same reason. In May 1862 the township was named in honor of Senator William Windom of Winona.

== Geography ==
According to the United States Census Bureau, the township has a total area of 36.0 square miles (93.3 km^{2}), all land.

== Demographics ==
As of the census of 2000, there were 640 people, 224 households, and 183 families residing in the township. The population density was 17.8 people per square mile (6.9/km^{2}). There were 237 housing units at an average density of 6.6/sq mi (2.5/km^{2}). The racial makeup of the township was 93.44% White, 0.16% African American, 0.94% Native American, 0.78% Asian, 4.06% from other races, and 0.62% from two or more races. Hispanic or Latino of any race were 5.47% of the population.

There were 224 households, out of which 40.2% had children under the age of 18 living with them, 73.2% were married couples living together, 5.4% had a female householder with no husband present, and 17.9% were non-families. 15.6% of all households were made up of individuals, and 5.8% had someone living alone who was 65 years of age or older. The average household size was 2.86 and the average family size was 3.18.

In the township the population was spread out, with 28.3% under the age of 18, 7.8% from 18 to 24, 27.5% from 25 to 44, 23.3% from 45 to 64, and 13.1% who were 65 years of age or older. The median age was 37 years. For every 100 females, there were 104.5 males. For every 100 females age 18 and over, there were 104.9 males.

The median income for a household in the township was $49,643, and the median income for a family was $51,528. Males had a median income of $32,361 versus $23,125 for females. The per capita income for the township was $18,372. About 2.2% of families and 3.5% of the population were below the poverty line, including 5.0% of those under age 18 and none of those age 65 or over.

== Cemeteries ==
- St. Peter's Catholic Cemetery is located in the southwest corner of the southeast quadrant of section 26 of the township. Its oldest known burial dates to 1891.
- Prairie View Cemetery is located in the northwest corner of the southwest quadrant of section 25 of the township. Its oldest known burial dates to 1882.
