= Worthington, Minnesota =

City in Minnesota, United States

- City
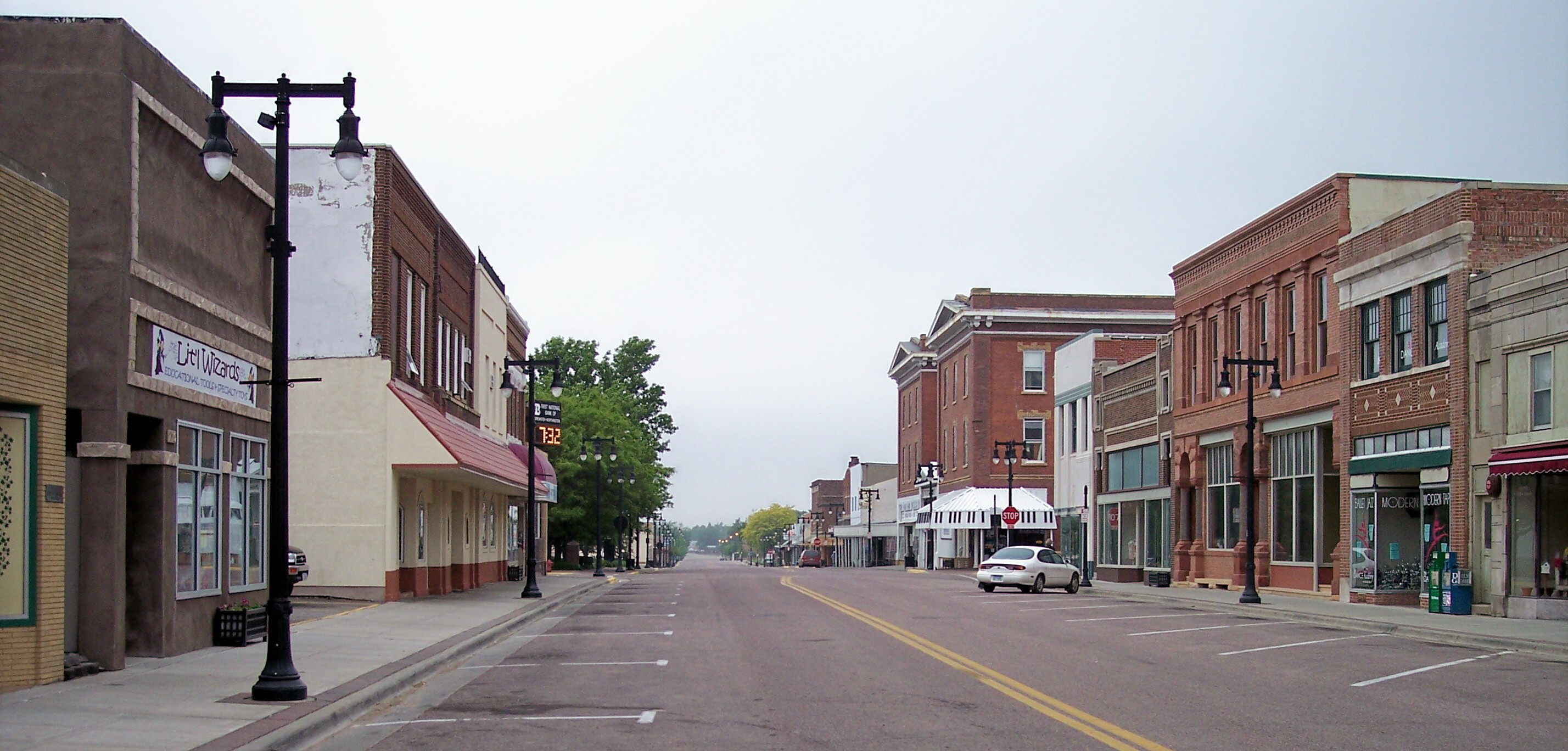
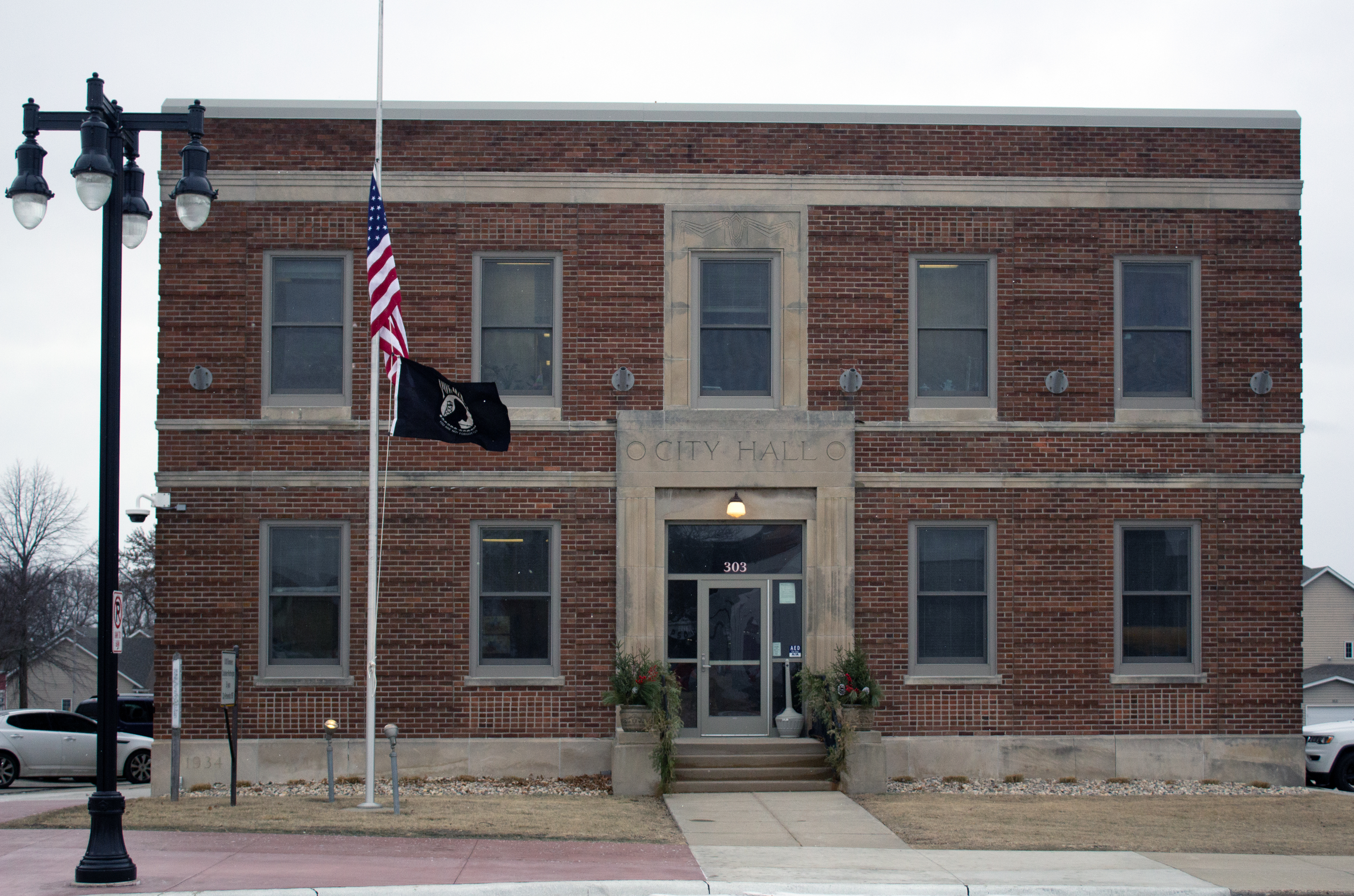
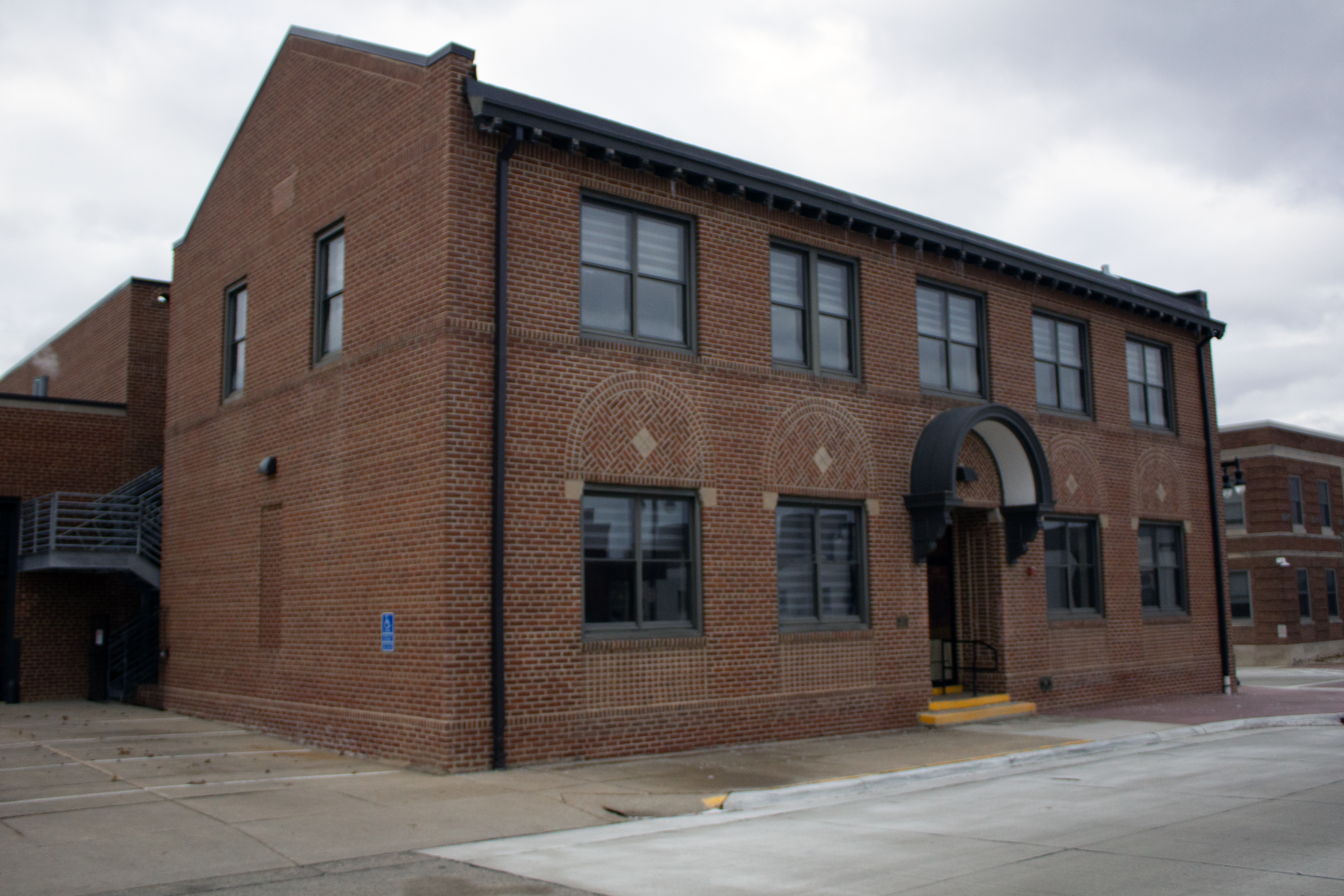
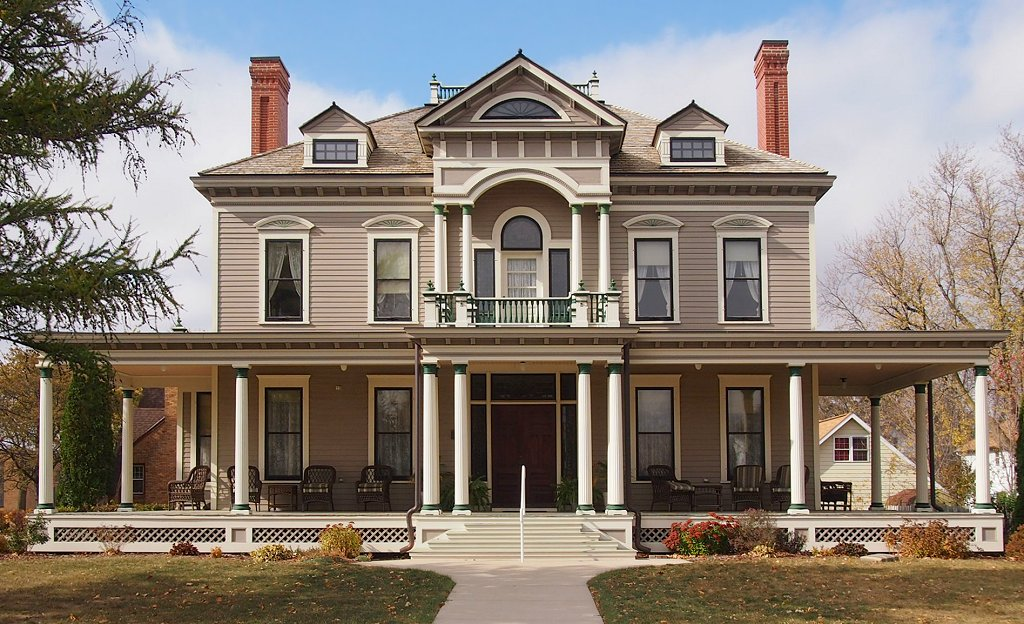
- Tenth Street in downtown Worthington in 2007 City Hall Nobles County Heritage Center Dayton House

- Location of Worthington in Nobles County, Minnesota
- Coordinates: 43°37′40.68″N 95°35′57.56″W
- Country: United States
- State: Minnesota
- County: Nobles
- Founded: 1871
- Incorporated: April 29, 1872

Government
  - Type: Mayor–Council
  - Mayor: Rick von Holdt
  - At-large: Chad Cummings
  - Councilmembers: Larry Janssen; Amy Ernst; Chris Kielblock; Mike Kuhle

Area
  - City: 9.337 sq mi (24.183 km^{2})
  - Land: 7.952 sq mi (20.596 km^{2})
  - Water: 1.385 sq mi (3.588 km^{2})
- Elevation: 1,572 ft (479 m)

Population (2020)
  - City: 13,947
  - Estimate (2023): 13,614
  - Density: 1,714.5/sq mi (661.99/km^{2})
  - Urban: 13,800
  - Metro: 21,727 (US: 496th)
- Time zone: UTC–6 (Central (CST))
  - Summer (DST): UTC–5 (CDT)
- ZIP Code: 56187
- Area codes: 507 and 924
- FIPS code: 27-71734
- GNIS feature ID: 2397378
- Sales tax: 7.875%
- Website: www.worthingtonmn.gov

Worthington is a city in and the county seat of Nobles County, Minnesota, United States. The population was 13,947 at the 2020 census.

== History ==
Worthington in 1893

The city's site was first settled in the 1870s as Okabena Station on a line of the Chicago, St. Paul, Minneapolis and Omaha Railway, later the Chicago and North Western Railway (now part of Union Pacific).

The first European likely to have visited the Nobles County area of southwestern Minnesota was French explorer Joseph Nicollet. Nicollet mapped the area between the Mississippi and Missouri Rivers in the 1830s. He called the region "Sisseton Country" in honor of the Sisseton band of Dakota Indians then living there. It was a rolling sea of wide open prairie grass that extended as far as the eye could see. One small lake in Sisseton Country was given the name "Lake Okabena" on Nicollet's map, "Okabena" being a Dakota word meaning "nesting place of the herons".

The town of Worthington was founded by "Yankees" (immigrants from New England, upstate New York, Northern Pennsylvania, and Northeast Ohio who were descended from the English Puritans who settled New England in the 1600s).

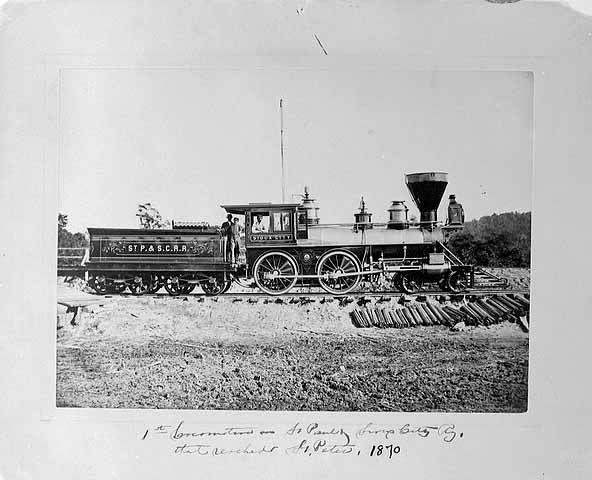
First train on the St Paul & Sioux City Railway

In 1871, the St. Paul & Sioux City Railway Company began connecting its two namesake cities with a rail line. The steam engines of that time required a large quantity of water, and water stations were needed every eight to twelve miles (13 to 19 km) along their routes. One of these stations, at the site of present-day Worthington, was designated "The Okabena Railway Station".

In the same year, Professor Ransom Humiston of Cleveland, Ohio, and Dr. A.P. Miller, editor of the Toledo Blade, organized a company to locate a colony of New England settlers who had already settled in Northern Ohio along the tracks of the Sioux City and St. Paul Railway. These people were "Yankee" settlers whose parents had moved from New England to the region of Northeast Ohio known as the Connecticut Western Reserve. They were primarily members of the Congregational Church, though due to the Second Great Awakening, many of them had converted to Methodism and Presbyterianism, and some had become Baptists before coming to what is now Minnesota. This colony, the National Colony, was to be a village of temperance, a place where evangelical Methodists, Presbyterians, Congregationalists, and Baptists could live free of the temptations of alcohol. A town was plotted, and the name was changed from the Okabena Railway Station to Worthington, Miller's mother-in-law's maiden name.

On April 29, 1872, regular passenger train service to Worthington started, and on that first train were the first of the National Colony settlers. One early arrival described the scene:

We were among the first members of the colony to arrive at the station of an unfinished railroad… There was a good hotel, well and comfortably furnished, one or two stores neatly furnished and already stocked with goods, [and] several other[s] in process of erection… The streets, scarcely to be defined as such, were full of prairie schooners, containing families waiting until masters could suit themselves with "claims," the women pursuing their housewifely avocations meanwhile—some having cooking stoves in their wagons, others using gypsy fires to do their culinary work; all seeming happy and hopeful.

Some settlers from New England were drinking men, most of them Civil War veterans from Massachusetts and Maine, and they came into conflict with the temperance movement. A curious event took place on Worthington's very first Fourth of July celebration. Hearing that there was a keg of beer in the Worthington House Hotel, Humiston entered the hotel, seized the keg, dragged it outside, and destroyed it with an axe. A witness described what happened next:

Upon seeing this, the young men of the town thought it to be rather an imposition, and collected together, procured the services of the band, and under the direction of a military officer marched to the rear of the hotel, and with a wheelbarrow and shovel took the empty keg that had been broken open, and playing the dead march with flag at half staff marched to the flagpole in front of Humiston's office where they dug a grave and gave the empty keg a burial with all the honors attending a soldier's funeral.

They then, with flag at full mast and with lively air, marched back to the ice house, procured a full keg of beer, returning to the grave, resting the keg thereon. Then a general invitation was given to all who desired to partake, which many did until the keg was emptied... In the evening they reassembled, burning Prof. Humiston in effigy about 10 p.m. Thus ended the glorious Fourth at Worthington, Minn.

Despite tensions between pro- and anti-temperance factions, the town grew rapidly. By the end of summer in 1872, 85 buildings had been constructed where just one year before there had been only a field of prairie grass.

Settlers poured into the region. At first they came almost exclusively from the six New England states due to issues of overpopulation combined with land shortages. Some had come from Upstate New York and had parents and grandparents who had moved to that region from New England during the early 1800s and late 1700s. Due to the large number of New Englanders and New England transplants from upstate New York, Worthington, like much of Minnesota at the time, was very culturally continuous with early New England culture for much of its early history. It was the age of the Homestead Act, when 160 acres (0.65 km^{2}) of government land could be claimed for free. All one had to do was live on the land and "improve" it, a vague requirement. In such an atmosphere, settlers without connection to the National Colony also arrived in great number, and few of those were temperance activists. The ensuing winter was severe, and swarms of grasshoppers stripped farmers' fields bare in the summer of 1873. Still, settlers came. 1874 produced a bumper harvest, followed by another grasshopper invasion in 1875. 1876 and 1877 were both good farming years. Grasshoppers returned for the last time in 1879, and a bright future began for southwestern Minnesota. According to the 1880 census, Nobles County had 4,435 residents, 636 of them in Worthington.

In the early 1900s German immigrants began arriving in Worthington in large numbers, not directly from Germany, but mostly from other places in the midwest, especially Ohio, where their communities had already been established.

Unlike in other parts of the country, the Germans did not face xenophobia in Nobles County, but were welcomed by the Yankee population. This led to many writing back to Ohio, which led to chain migration to the region, greatly increasing the German-American population. The "Yankee" population of Americans of English descent did not come into conflict with the German-American community for much of their early history together, but the two communities were divided on the issue of World War I, the Yankee community divided about and the Germans unanimously opposed to American entry into the war. The Yankee community was generally pro-British, but many also did not want the United States to enter the war. The Germans were sympathetic to Germany and did not want the United States to enter into a war against Germany, but the Germans were not anti-British. Before World War I, many German community leaders in Minnesota and Wisconsin spoke openly and enthusiastically about how much better America was than Germany, due primarily (in their eyes) to the presence of English law and the English political culture the Americans had inherited from the colonial era, which they contrasted with the turmoil and oppression in Germany they had so recently fled. Other immigrant groups followed the Germans, including settlers from Ireland, Norway and Sweden.

From 1939 to 1940, Worthington was home to the Worthington Cardinals, a minor league baseball team. Worthington played as a member of the Class D Western League. The Worthington Cardinals were an affiliate of the St. Louis Cardinals.

On December 12, 2006, the Immigration and Customs Enforcement (ICE) staged a coordinated predawn raid at the Swift & Company meat packing plant in Worthington and five other Swift plants in western states, interviewing workers and hauling hundreds off in buses.

== Geography ==
According to the United States Census Bureau, the city has a total area of 9.337 square miles (24.18 km^{2}), of which, 7.952 square miles (20.60 km^{2}) is land and 1.385 square miles (3.59 km^{2}) is water.

=== Climate ===
Climate data for Worthington 2 NNE, Minnesota (1991−2020 normals, extremes 1971−present)
Month	Jan	Feb	Mar	Apr	May	Jun	Jul	Aug	Sep	Oct	Nov	Dec	Year
Record high °F (°C)	63 (17)	65 (18)	82 (28)	91 (33)	99 (37)	103 (39)	103 (39)	104 (40)	101 (38)	92 (33)	79 (26)	64 (18)	104 (40)
Mean maximum °F (°C)	42.9 (6.1)	48.3 (9.1)	66.2 (19.0)	79.8 (26.6)	88.2 (31.2)	92.8 (33.8)	92.4 (33.6)	91.2 (32.9)	88.0 (31.1)	81.4 (27.4)	64.3 (17.9)	47.1 (8.4)	95.3 (35.2)
Mean daily maximum °F (°C)	22.6 (−5.2)	27.3 (−2.6)	39.7 (4.3)	55.1 (12.8)	68.0 (20.0)	78.4 (25.8)	82.0 (27.8)	79.4 (26.3)	72.9 (22.7)	58.9 (14.9)	41.8 (5.4)	27.9 (−2.3)	54.5 (12.5)
Daily mean °F (°C)	14.0 (−10.0)	18.4 (−7.6)	30.5 (−0.8)	43.9 (6.6)	56.9 (13.8)	67.9 (19.9)	71.4 (21.9)	68.6 (20.3)	61.0 (16.1)	47.6 (8.7)	32.5 (0.3)	19.8 (−6.8)	44.4 (6.9)
Mean daily minimum °F (°C)	5.3 (−14.8)	9.6 (−12.4)	21.2 (−6.0)	32.7 (0.4)	45.8 (7.7)	57.4 (14.1)	60.8 (16.0)	57.8 (14.3)	49.1 (9.5)	36.3 (2.4)	23.2 (−4.9)	11.8 (−11.2)	34.3 (1.3)
Mean minimum °F (°C)	−16.9 (−27.2)	−11.3 (−24.1)	−1.6 (−18.7)	17.9 (−7.8)	31.6 (−0.2)	44.9 (7.2)	49.2 (9.6)	46.2 (7.9)	33.7 (0.9)	20.8 (−6.2)	4.9 (−15.1)	−10.3 (−23.5)	−19.5 (−28.6)
Record low °F (°C)	−31 (−35)	−30 (−34)	−20 (−29)	4 (−16)	23 (−5)	37 (3)	36 (2)	36 (2)	24 (−4)	10 (−12)	−12 (−24)	−28 (−33)	−31 (−35)
Average precipitation inches (mm)	0.71 (18)	0.82 (21)	1.46 (37)	3.07 (78)	4.09 (104)	5.24 (133)	3.54 (90)	3.85 (98)	3.21 (82)	2.38 (60)	1.27 (32)	0.88 (22)	30.52 (775)
Average snowfall inches (cm)	9.8 (25)	10.9 (28)	5.7 (14)	4.2 (11)	0.2 (0.51)	0.0 (0.0)	0.0 (0.0)	0.0 (0.0)	0.0 (0.0)	1.0 (2.5)	4.6 (12)	8.6 (22)	45.2 (115)
Average precipitation days (≥ 0.01 in)	7.9	6.9	7.7	10.4	13.6	12.5	8.8	9.8	9.1	8.8	6.1	7.4	109.0
Average snowy days (≥ 0.1 in)	6.3	5.7	3.4	1.9	0.1	0.0	0.0	0.0	0.0	0.9	3.2	5.7	27.2
Source: NOAA

== Demographics ==
Historical population
Census	Pop.	Note	%±
1880	636		—
1890	1,164		83.0%
1900	2,386		105.0%
1910	2,385		0.0%
1920	3,481		46.0%
1930	3,878		11.4%
1940	5,918		52.6%
1950	7,923		33.9%
1960	9,015		13.8%
1970	9,916		10.0%
1980	10,243		3.3%
1990	9,977		−2.6%
2000	11,283		13.1%
2010	12,764		13.1%
2020	13,947		9.3%
2023 (est.)	13,614		−2.4%
U.S. Decennial Census; 2020 Census

The U.S. Bureau of Census now classifies Worthington as a micropolitan area, with a population of 20,508. The area has had a relatively high level of immigration, mostly Hispanics, in the early 21st century. Some sources credit this immigration trend for revitalizing the city's economy, which had been constrained by a shrinking population.

As of the 2022 American Community Survey, there are 4,570 estimated households in Worthington with an average of 2.92 persons per household. The city has a median household income of $58,690. Approximately 15.4% of the city's population lives at or below the poverty line. Worthington has an estimated 62.4% employment rate, with 15.8% of the population holding a bachelor's degree or higher and 70.3% holding a high school diploma.

The top five reported ancestries (people were allowed to report up to two ancestries, thus the figures will generally add to more than 100%) were English (54.5%), Spanish (32.7%), Indo-European (0.4%), Asian and Pacific Islander (7.0%), and Other (5.4%).

=== Racial and ethnic composition ===
Worthington, Minnesota – racial and ethnic composition Note: the US Census treats Hispanic/Latino as an ethnic category. This table excludes Latinos from the racial categories and assigns them to a separate category. Hispanics/Latinos may be of any race.
Race / ethnicity (NH = non-Hispanic)	Pop. 2000	Pop. 2010	Pop. 2020	% 2000	% 2010	% 2020
White alone (NH)	7,934	6,238	4,864	70.32%	48.87%	34.88%
Black or African American alone (NH)	205	682	946	1.82%	5.34%	6.78%
Native American or Alaska Native alone (NH)	33	51	38	0.29%	0.40%	0.27%
Asian alone (NH)	783	1,081	1,248	6.94%	8.47%	8.95%
Pacific Islander alone (NH)	0	7	31	0.00%	0.05%	0.22%
Other race alone (NH)	9	21	28	0.08%	0.17%	0.20%
Mixed race or multiracial (NH)	144	163	233	1.28%	1.28%	1.67%
Hispanic or Latino (any race)	2,175	4,521	6,559	19.28%	35.42%	47.03%
Total	11,283	12,764	13,947	100.00%	100.00%	100.00%

=== 2020 census ===
As of the 2020 census, Worthington had a population of 13,947. The median age was 31.7 years. 30.5% of residents were under the age of 18, 8.8% were under the age of 5, and 14.1% were 65 years of age or older. For every 100 females there were 99.3 males, and for every 100 females age 18 and over there were 99.0 males age 18 and over.

98.9% of residents lived in urban areas, while 1.1% lived in rural areas.

There were 4,503 households and 3,089 families in Worthington. Of all households, 40.3% had children under the age of 18 living in them, 46.4% were married-couple households, 19.3% were households with a male householder and no spouse or partner present, and 26.3% were households with a female householder and no spouse or partner present. About 26.2% of all households were made up of individuals and 12.0% had someone living alone who was 65 years of age or older.

The population density was 1,773.8 inhabitants per square mile (684.9/km^{2}). There were 4,737 housing units at an average density of 602.4 inhabitants per square mile (232.6/km^{2}). Of the housing units, 4.9% were vacant. The homeowner vacancy rate was 1.3% and the rental vacancy rate was 6.0%.

=== 2010 census ===
As of the 2010 census, there were 12,764 people, 4,458 households, and 2,917 families residing in the city. The population density was 1,740.0 inhabitants per square mile (671.8/km^{2}). There were 4,699 housing units at an average density of 640.2 inhabitants per square mile (247.2/km^{2}). The racial makeup of the city was 62.17% White, 5.47% African American, 0.71% Native American, 8.65% Asian, 0.07% Pacific Islander, 20.53% from some other races and 2.40% from two or more races. Hispanic or Latino people of any race were 35.42% of the population.

There were 4,458 households, of which 34.7% had children under the age of 18 living with them, 48.4% were married couples living together, 10.7% had a female householder with no husband present, 6.3% had a male householder with no wife present, and 34.6% were non-families. 28.4% of all households were made up of individuals, and 13.9% had someone living alone who was 65 years of age or older. The average household size was 2.79 and the average family size was 3.36.

The median age in the city was 33.5 years. 26.8% of residents were under the age of 18; 10.7% were between the ages of 18 and 24; 26.1% were from 25 to 44; 21.3% were from 45 to 64; and 15% were 65 years of age or older. The gender makeup of the city was 51.1% male and 48.9% female.

=== 2000 census ===
As of the 2000 census, there were 11,283 people, 4,311 households, and 2,828 families residing in the city. The population density was 1,578.9 inhabitants per square mile (609.6/km^{2}). There were 4,573 housing units at an average density of 639.9 inhabitants per square mile (247.1/km^{2}). The racial makeup of the city was 76.81% White, 1.91% African American, 0.49% Native American, 7.06% Asian, 0.13% Pacific Islander, 11.49% from some other races and 2.11% from two or more races. Hispanic or Latino people of any race were 19.28% of the population.

There were 4,311 households, out of which 30.5% had children under the age of 18 living with them, 52.4% were married couples living together, 8.9% had a female householder with no husband present, and 34.4% were non-families. 28.9% of all households were made up of individuals, and 15.5% had someone living alone who was 65 years of age or older. The average household size was 2.55 and the average family size was 3.12.

In the city, the population was spread out, with 25.5% under the age of 18, 9.7% from 18 to 24, 27.1% from 25 to 44, 20.1% from 45 to 64, and 17.6% who were 65 years of age or older. The median age was 36 years. For every 100 females, there were 98.6 males. For every 100 females age 18 and over, there were 97.6 males.

The median income for a household in the city was $36,250, and the median income for a family was $44,643. Males had a median income of $28,750 versus $20,880 for females. The per capita income for the city was $18,078. About 9.1% of families and 13.3% of the population were below the poverty line, including 18.4% of those under age 18 and 12.3% of those age 65 or over.

== Arts and culture ==
Worthington hosts many annual events: Windsurfing Regatta & Music Festival (June), International Festival (July), King Turkey Day (September), and Holiday Parade (November).

=== Nobles County History Center ===
After World War I, the Minnesota National Guard commissioned two dozen armories around the state to serve as community centers and bases. Worthington completed its armory in 1923: two brick buildings which contained administrative offices, a drill hall, a gymnasium with a balcony and bleachers, public restrooms, a mess hall, a shooting range, and equipment storage rooms. The building was used for community events including dances, concerts, lectures, exhibitions, sports tournaments, King Turkey Day events, send-offs for World War II draftees, polio vaccinations, and physical examinations for Vietnam War draftees.

In 1992, after Minnesota downsized its national guard, the building was decommissioned, bought by the city, and began being leased as a commercial space. In 2015, Nobles County bought the site, and in 2017 it was added to the National Register of Historic Places. Beginning in 2019, Nobles county offered the space to the Nobles County Historical Society for use as a museum, as long as the center could raise funds for the building's renovation, which it did. The building reopened as the Nobles County History Center in November 2022. Today it houses an exhibit and event space, a library, offices, meeting rooms, and climate-controlled artifact storage.

== Government ==
Worthington is in Minnesota's 1st congressional district, represented by Republican Brad Finstad of New Ulm. At the state level, Worthington is in Senate District 21, represented by Republican Bill Weber, and in House District 21B, represented by Republican Marj Fogelman.

=== Presidential election results ===
Presidential election results

Precinct General Election Results
Year	Republican	Democratic	Third parties
2024	56.2% 2,121	42.2% 1,591	1.7% 63
2020	52.0% 2,160	45.5% 1,892	2.5% 105
2016	49.8% 2,056	42.9% 1,768	7.3% 301
2012	47.0% 1,907	51.6% 2,094	1.4% 55
2008	46.3% 2,031	51.7% 2,267	2.0% 86
2004	54.0% 2,443	44.4% 2,007	1.6% 72
2000	53.0% 2,281	43.5% 1,870	3.6% 153
1996	41.7% 1,889	47.5% 2,149	10.8% 491
1992	39.5% 1,937	38.3% 1,877	22.2% 1,087
1988	48.0% 2,283	47.9% 2,280	4.1% 195
1984	50.8% 2,542	44.5% 2,229	4.7% 235
1980	45.6% 2,268	46.0% 2,284	8.4% 418
1976	46.9% 2,426	51.6% 2,667	1.5% 79
1972	52.4% 2,579	46.9% 2,311	0.7% 33
1968	48.8% 2,109	47.7% 2,064	3.5% 152
1964	40.8% 1,711	59.1% 2,478	0.1% 4
1960	62.7% 2,693	37.2% 1,595	0.1% 4

=== Local politics ===
The mayor of Worthington is Rick von Holdt. City council members meet in City Hall on the second and fourth Mondays of every month to discuss objectives and goals for the city. The city is divided into two wards, with one at-large council member. The mayor and council members are elected to four-year terms. Current Worthington city council members, in addition to Von Holdt, include:

- Larry Janssen, 1st Ward
- Chris Kielblock, 1st Ward
- Mike Kuhle, 2nd Ward
- Amy Ernst, 2nd Ward
- Dennis Weber, At Large

== Education ==
Worthington is served by Independent School District 518. Worthington's school mascot is the Trojan, and its high school athletic teams play in the Big South Conference. ISD 518 is known regionally for its robust music program offerings, with band, string orchestra, choir, and theater ensembles open to all students. Worthington Senior High School's 'Spirit of Worthington' Trojan Marching Band, with over 160 members, is an ensemble that has performed nationally 5 times. The Trojans' performances included two at the 75th and 78th annual McDonald's Thanksgiving Day Parade in Chicago in 2008 and 2011, respectively. In 2019, the Trojans were a featured band at the Chick-fil-A Peach Bowl in Atlanta, Georgia.

- High School: Worthington Senior High School
- Middle School: Worthington Middle School
- Elementary School: Prairie Elementary School

Worthington's private, parochial schools include:

1. Worthington Christian School, which serves grades K-8.
2. St. Mary's Elementary School, which serves grades K-6.

Worthington's local higher education institution is Minnesota West Community and Technical College. Minnesota West's Worthington campus is a two-year college that offers associate degrees in a wide variety of majors, along with diplomas and certificates in areas from practical nursing to accounting, among others.

Worthington and the surrounding area are served by the Nobles County Library, part of the Plum Creek Library System, which is based in the city.

== Infrastructure ==
=== Transportation ===
==== Transit ====
- Prairieland Transit System

==== Highways ====
- Interstate 90
- U.S. Route 59
- Minnesota State Highway 60
- Minnesota State Highway 266 (decommissioned - designated as Nobles County Road 25)
- Nobles County Road 25
- Nobles County Road 35

== Media ==
The Globe serves Worthington, Nobles County, and surrounding areas with a print newspaper, an e-paper and website. It was purchased by the Forum Communications Company in 1995 and publishes a print edition on Wednesdays and an e-edition on Saturdays.

== Notable people ==
- Dwayne Andreas, CEO of Archer Daniels Midland
- Wayne R. Bassett Sr., Minnesota state representative
- William Elijah Bloom, Minnesota state representative
- Wendell Butcher, football player
- George Dayton, businessman and founder of Dayton's
- Matt Entenza, minority leader of the Minnesota House of Representatives
- Gordon Forbes, Minnesota state representative
- Francis G. Judge, Minnesota state representative
- Larry Kellner Kellner, former CEO of Continental Airlines
- Big Tiny Little, pianist and television personality
- Peter Ludlow, analytic philosopher
- Stephen Miller, fourth governor of Minnesota
- David Minge, U.S. representative from Minnesota and judge
- Gordon Moore, justice of the Minnesota Supreme Court
- Lee Nystrom, football player
- Tim O'Brien, novelist known for Vietnam War literature
- John Olson, state senator

== Sister city ==
There is a sister-city relationship between Worthington and Crailsheim, Germany, the first such relationship in history between an American and a German city. The relationship began in 1947, when Martha (Cashel) McCarthy and her parents led a campaign to collect clothing and food for Crailsheim's citizens (who had endured the destruction of 90% of their city ten days prior to the end of World War II).

== See also ==
- Impact of the COVID-19 pandemic on the meat industry in the United States – Impact of COVID-19
