= Class reunion =

Meeting of former classmates

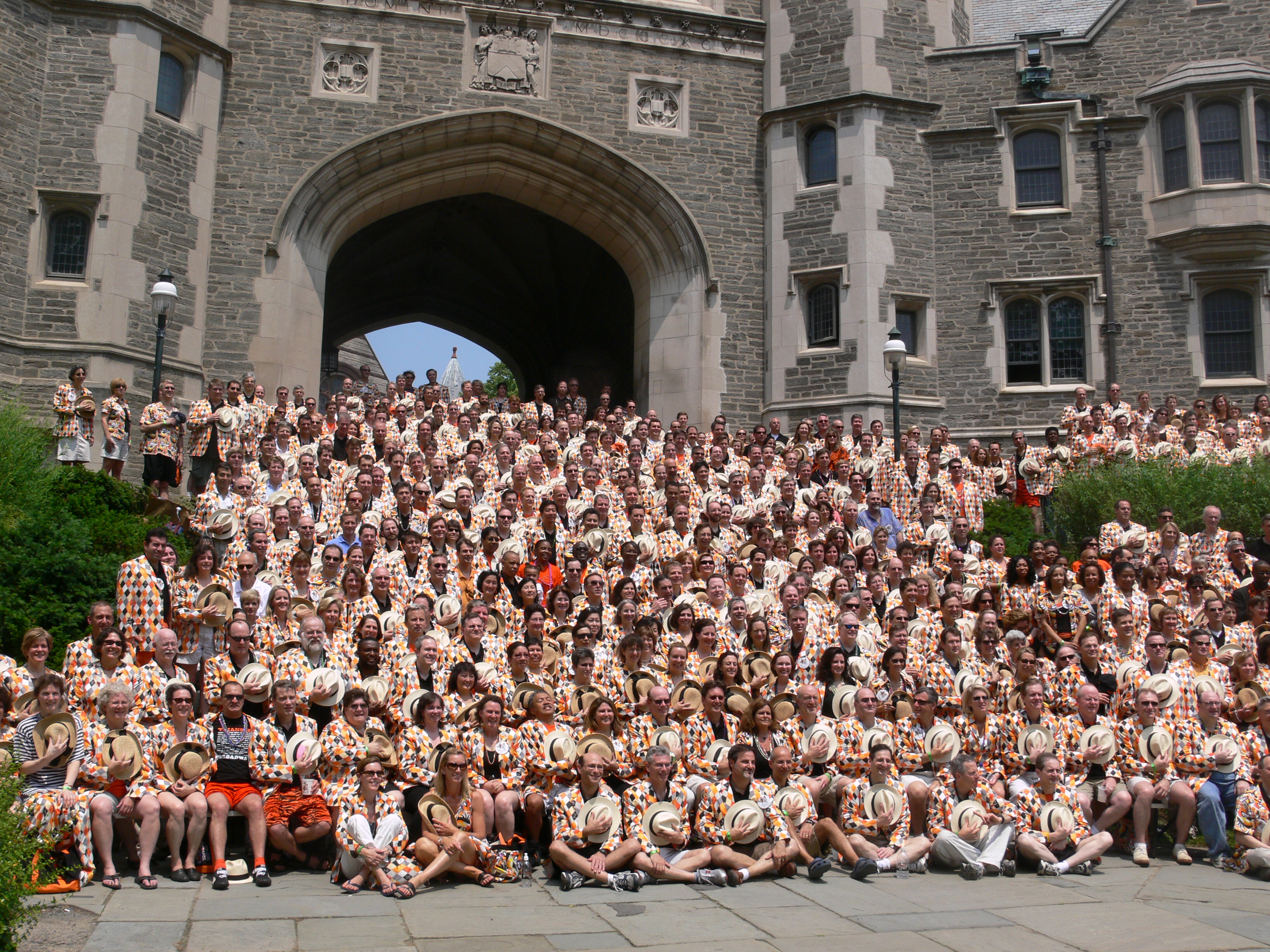
25th reunion of the Princeton class of 1982 in 2007

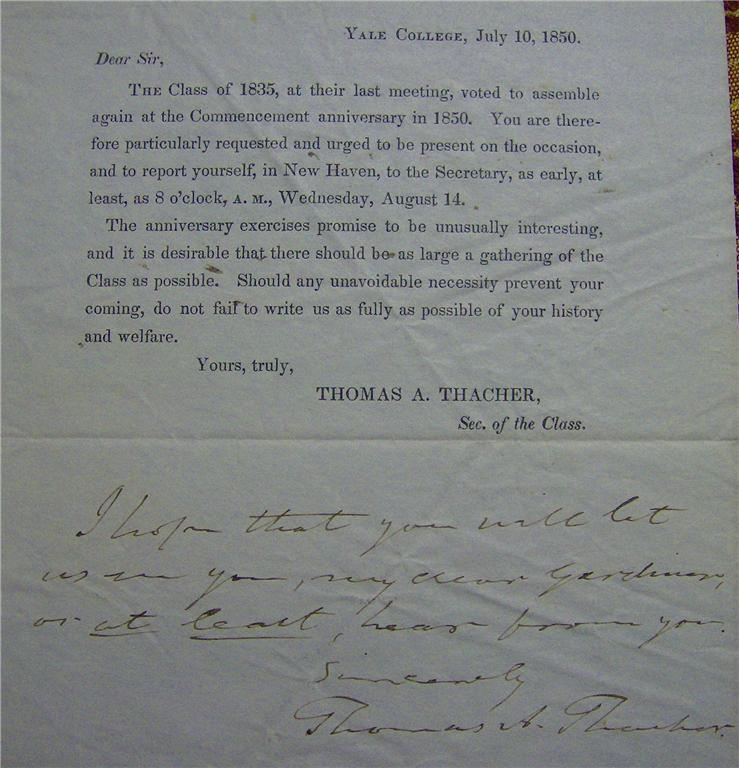
Class reunion invitation, Yale College, 1850

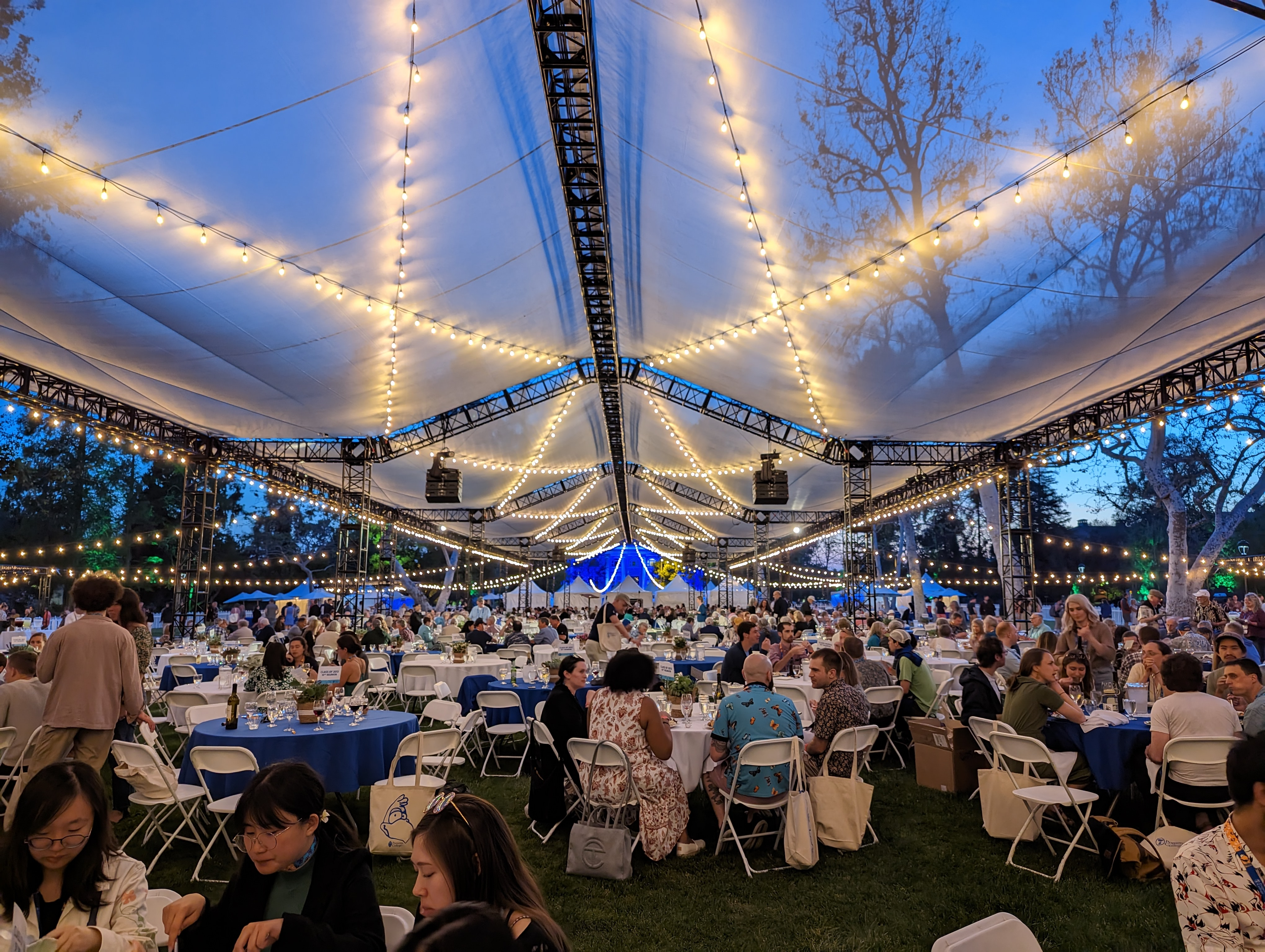
Alumni weekend dinner at Pomona College in 2023

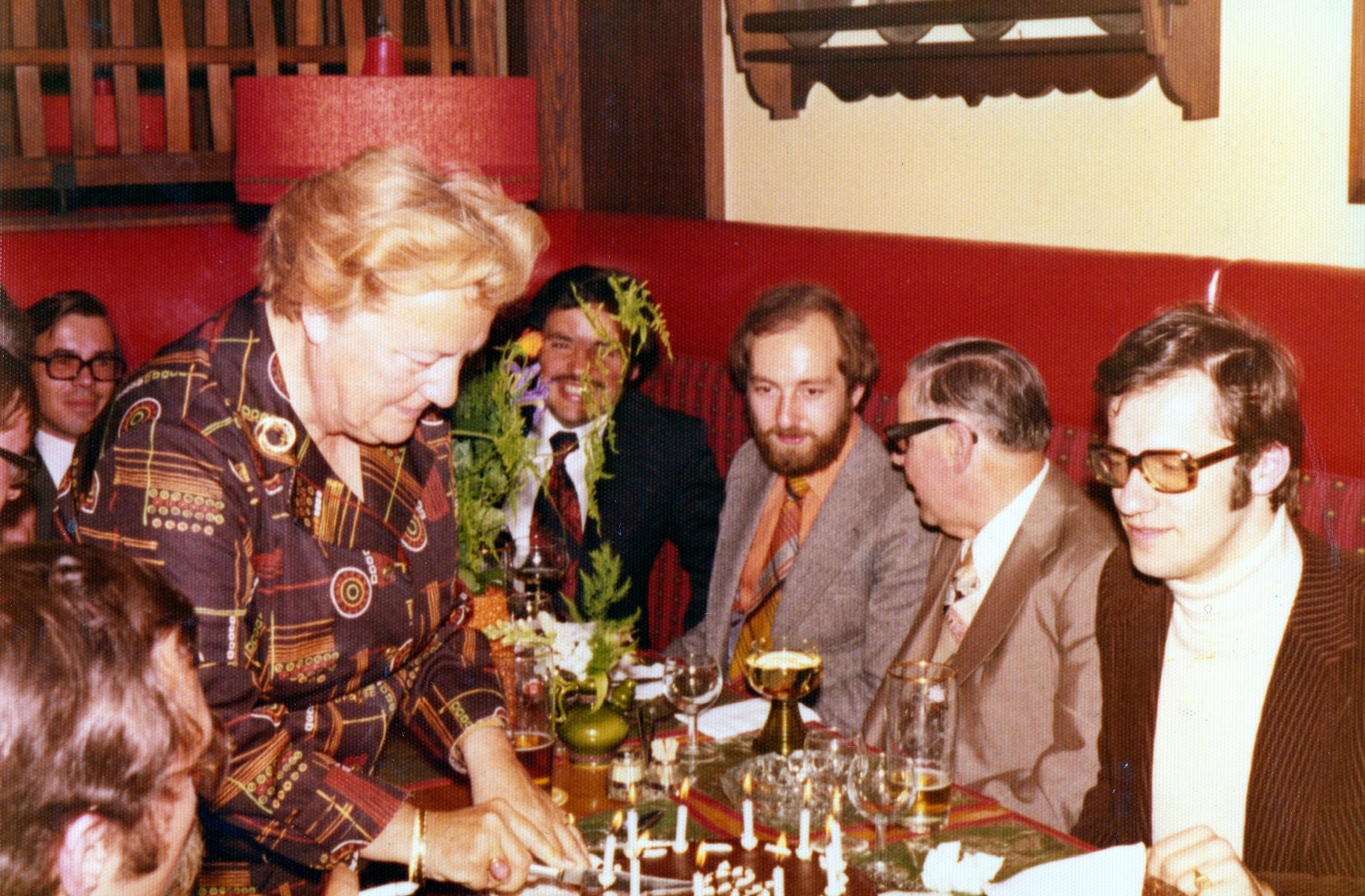
Class reunion of GRG 7 Kandlgasse students in Vienna with the participation of former teachers

A class reunion is a meeting of former classmates, often organized at or near their former high school or college. It is scheduled near an anniversary of their graduation, e.g. every 5 or 10 years. Their teachers and administrators may also be invited. Those attending will usually reminisce about their student days and bring one another up to date on what has happened since they last met.

Some class reunions also include a reunion class gift to the institution.

== Organization ==
Searching for former classmates to invite to a reunion is often challenging, as alumni often lose touch with each other. This has become somewhat easier with the advent of social media sites such as Facebook.

== Class reunions in film, television, and literature ==
In film, television, and literature, class reunions have been a device used to show the eruption of emotions such as shame, hatred, and guilt within individual characters who, suddenly faced again with their own youth, become aware that they have been unable to cope with their past.

Those who used to be mistreated by their teachers or classmates believe they can now take revenge on their former torturers. Participants often nostalgically reminisce about their old school days or fondly remember their school pranks. They can be concerned about how their lives have turned out compared with the lives of their former classmates, and can feel pressured enough to fabricate stories about their careers, personal accomplishments, and relationships.

Another theme of this kind of fiction is former classmates taking up with their old flames again, either because they have developed into an admirable adult or for the opposite reason—because they have not changed at all.

Film

- Falling in Love Again (1980)
- National Lampoon's Class Reunion (1982)
- The Big Chill (1983)
- Peggy Sue Got Married (1986)
- Archie: To Riverdale and Back Again (1990)
- Kenneth Branagh's Peter's Friends (1992)
- Beautiful Girls (1996)
- George Armitage's Grosse Pointe Blank (1997)
- Romy and Michele's High School Reunion (1997)
- Since You've Been Gone (1998)
- Classmates (2006)
- 10 years (2011)
- American Reunion (2012)
- Back in the Day (2014)
- Central Intelligence (2016)
- '96 (2018)

Television

- "The Class of '62" episode of the sitcom Only Fools and Horses (1991)
- "High School" episode of the sitcom Everybody Loves Raymond (1997)
- "The Reunion Show" episode of the sitcom The Nanny (1998)
- "Mother and Child Reunion" episode of the teen drama Degrassi: The Next Generation (2001)
- GCB (2012)

Literature

- Philip Roth's American Pastoral (1997)
- Tim O'Brien's July, July (2002)
- Ben Elton's Past Mortem (2004)
- Paul Reizin's Fiends Reunited (2004)
- Simone van der Vlugt's De reünie (2004)
