= List of U.S. Army veterans =

This is a list of notable U.S. Army veterans, who already have Wikipedia articles about them and their military service.

== Actors ==
- Alan Alda
- Robert Duvall
- Clint Eastwood
- James Earl Jones
- Kris Kristofferson
- Bob Newhart
- Leonard Nimoy
- Sidney Poitier
- Mickey Rooney
- Tom Selleck
- Mr. T
- Gene Wilder

== Cartoonists ==
- Charles M. Schulz

== Generals ==
- George C. Marshall
- George S. Patton
- John J. Pershing
- David Petraeus
- Colin Powell
- Norman Schwarzkopf Jr.

== Musicians ==
- Jimi Hendrix
- Maynard James Keenan

== Politicians ==
- Tammy Duckworth
- Tulsi Gabbard
- Ed Koch
- Charles Rangel

== Rappers ==
- Ice-T, also an actor

== Singers ==
- Tony Bennett
- Elvis Presley

== Soldiers ==
- Audie Murphy

== Sport Figures ==
- Jackie Robinson
- Pat Tillman

== U.S. Presidents ==
- Dwight D. Eisenhower
- Ulysses S. Grant
- Andrew Jackson
- Theodore Roosevelt
- Harry S. Truman
- George Washington

== U.S. Supreme Court Justices ==
- Hugo Black
- Stephen Breyer
- Anthony Kennedy
- Earl Warren

== Writers ==
- E. L. Doctorow
- Yusef Komunyakaa
- Norman Mailer
- Tim O'Brien (author)
- J. D. Salinger
