= The Things They Carried =

1990 short story collection by Tim O'Brien

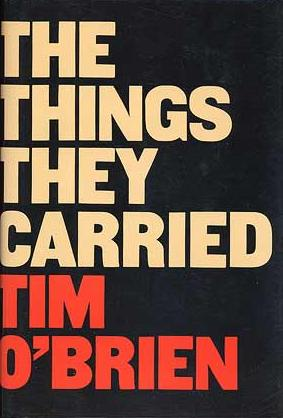
- First edition cover
- Author: Tim O'Brien
- Language: English
- Genre: Historical Fiction
- Published: March 28, 1990
- Publisher: Houghton Mifflin
- Publication place: United States
- Media type: Print (hardcover, paperback)
- Pages: 233
- ISBN: 0767902890
- Preceded by: The Nuclear Age (1985)
- Followed by: In the Lake of the Woods (1994)

The Things They Carried (1990) is a collection of linked short stories by American novelist Tim O'Brien, about a platoon of American soldiers fighting on the ground in the Vietnam War. His third book about the war is based upon his experiences as a soldier in the 23rd Infantry Division.

O'Brien generally refrains from political debate and discourse regarding the Vietnam War. He was dismayed that people in his home town seemed to have so little understanding of the war and its world. It was in part a response to what he considered ignorance that he wrote The Things They Carried. It was published by Houghton Mifflin in 1990.

Many of the characters are semi-autobiographical, sharing similarities with figures from his memoir If I Die in a Combat Zone, Box Me Up and Ship Me Home. In The Things They Carried, O'Brien plays with the genre of metafiction; he writes using verisimilitude. His use of real place names and inclusion of himself as the protagonist blurs fiction and non-fiction. As part of this effect, O'Brien dedicates The Things They Carried to the fictional men of the "Alpha Company," giving it “the form of a war memoir,” states O’Brien.

== Plot summaries ==
"The Things They Carried"

Lieutenant Jimmy Cross, the leader of a platoon of soldiers in Vietnam, carries physical reminders of Martha, the object of his unrequited love. Thoughts of Martha often distract Lieutenant Cross from his team's objectives. A death in the squad under his supervision causes Cross to reconsider his priorities; as he was heartbroken, he burns and throws away all reminders of Martha in order to focus on the mission and avoid distractions.

"Love"

Cross and O'Brien reminisce about the war and about Martha. O'Brien asks if he can write a story about Cross, expressing his memories and hopes for the future; Cross agrees, thinking that perhaps Martha will read it and come find him.

"Spin"

A series of unrelated memories from the war is narrated from O'Brien's point of view. It includes moments of camaraderie and beauty: a joke of a hate letter to the Draft Board; learning a rain dance between battles.

"On the Rainy River"

O'Brien gets drafted as soon as he graduates from college. He is reluctant to go to war and considers fleeing the draft; he begins to travel north to the Canada–US border on the Rainy River. Near the border, he encounters an elderly stranger who allows him to work through his internal struggle. O'Brien is given the opportunity to escape; however, the societal pressures are too much for him. He goes to war ashamed with his inability to face the consequences of leaving.

"Enemies and Friends"

Told in two sections, the developing relationship between soldiers Jensen and Strunk is shown. At first regularly antagonized by one another, the two are drawn toward respect and friendship by the stress and horrors of warfare. Ultimately, they agree that if one should be wounded, the other must deal a fatal blow as a form of mercy.

"How to Tell a True War Story"

O'Brien explores the telling of war stories by comrades, revealing that truth is delicate and malleable. Anything can be faked ... but generally, only the worst events can be proven real. He concludes that, in the end, the truth of a story doesn't matter so much as what the story is trying to say.

"The Dentist"

In order to mourn Curt Lemon, a man O'Brien did not know well, he shares a brief recollection about a bizarre interaction between Lemon and an army dentist. Lemon, who is afraid of dentists, faints before the dentist can examine him. Later that night, however, he complains of a phantom tooth ache so severe a tooth is pulled - even though it's perfectly healthy. Lemon has felt he needs to prove himself in front of his men and be the fearless man all soldiers are supposed to be.

"Sweetheart of the Song Tra Bong"

O'Brien recounts the legendary (and almost certainly exaggerated) tale of Rat Kiley's first assignment, near the Song Tra Bong river. The area is so isolated that one of the soldiers flies his hometown girlfriend in by helicopter. At first, she cooks, cleans, and tends to the soldiers' wounds, but she gradually assimilates into Vietnamese guerrilla culture, even wearing a necklace made of human tongues, and disappears into the jungle.

"Stockings"

O'Brien explains how Henry Dobbins wore the stockings of his girlfriend around his neck to bed, and sometimes to battle. Even when the girlfriend breaks things off, he keeps the stockings around his neck, as their powers have been demonstrated.

"Church"

The platoon discovers an abandoned building being used as a sort of church, inhabited by monks who bring them food and supplies. The men discuss their relationships with churches, and for the most part, appreciate the interaction with other people and the peace of the building. Henry Dobbins wants to become a priest, but decides otherwise.

"The Man I Killed"

O'Brien describes a man he killed in My Khe, and how he did it. He makes up a life story for the man, torturing himself with the idea that the victim had been a gentle soul.

"Ambush"

O'Brien's daughter asks if he killed anyone in the war; he lies to her that he did not. He then tells the story of an ambush outside My Khe, in which O'Brien kills a young man who may or may not have wanted to harm him.

"Style"

The platoon witnesses a young Vietnamese girl dancing through the burned remains of her village, and argue over whether it's a ritual or simply what she likes to do. Later, Azar mocks the girl, and Dobbins rebukes him.

"Speaking of Courage"

After his service, Norman Bowker is at a loss. His former girlfriend has married someone else, his closest friends are dead. He reflects on the medals he won in Vietnam, and imagines telling his father about both these and the medals he did not win. Ultimately, although he has no one to share these memories with, he finds catharsis in imagined conversations.

"Notes"

O'Brien says that Bowker asked him to write the previous story, and that he hanged himself three years later unable to regain his footing and find any meaning in life after the war. O'Brien muses over the suspicion that, without Harvard and writing, he too might have lost the will to live after returning from Vietnam.

"In the Field"

When Kiowa is killed on the banks of a river, during a mission led by Jimmy Cross, Cross takes responsibility for his death. He writes to Kiowa's father while the others search for the body - as usual, Azar jokes around at first. Another soldier also feels responsible for the death, as he did not save Kiowa; the story ends with the body being found in the mud, and both soldiers left to their guilt.

"Good Form"

O'Brien reiterates that the real truth does not have to be the same as the story truth, and that it is the emotions evoked by the story that matter. He says that his story about killing a man on the trail outside My Khe was fabricated, but he wanted to provoke the same feelings in the reader that he felt during the war.

"Field Trip"

After finishing the story, "In the Field," O'Brien says, he and his ten-year-old daughter visit the site of Kiowa's death with an interpreter. The field looks different from his memory of it, but he leaves a pair of Kiowa's moccasins in the spot where he believes Kiowa sank. In this way, he comes to terms with his friend's death.

"The Ghost Soldiers"

O'Brien recounts the two times he was wounded. The first time, he is treated by Rat Kiley, and is impressed with the man's courage and skill. The second time, he is treated by Kiley's replacement, Bobby Jorgenson; Jorgenson is incompetent, and nearly kills O'Brien. Furious, O'Brien promises revenge, but can recruit only Azar. They scare Jorgenson by pretending to be enemy soldiers, but the soldier proves that he is not a coward, so O'Brien lets go of his resentment.

"Night Life"

O'Brien tells the second-hand account of Rat Kiley's injury: warned of a possible attack, the platoon is on edge. Kiley reacts by distancing himself, the stress causing him first to be silent for days on end, and then to talk constantly. He has a breakdown from the pressure of being a medic, and shoots himself in the toe in order to get released from combat. No one questions his bravery.

"The Lives of the Dead"

O'Brien remembers his very first encounter with a dead body, that of his childhood sweetheart Linda. Suffering from a brain tumor, Linda died at the age of nine and O'Brien was deeply affected by her funeral. In Vietnam, O'Brien explains, the soldiers keep the dead alive by telling stories about them; in this way, he keeps Linda alive by telling her story. The thought and presence of death has shown to have a large effect on O'Brien.

== Characters ==
=== Main characters ===
Tim O'Brien
The narrator and the protagonist. While modeled after the author and sharing the same name, O'Brien (within the book) is a fictional character. The author intentionally blurs this distinction.
Lieutenant Jimmy Cross
The platoon leader, who is obsessed with a young woman back home, Martha (who does not return his feelings). He later believes that his obsession led to the death of Ted Lavender.
Bob "Rat" Kiley
A young medic whose exaggerations are complemented by his occasional cruelty. Eventually, he sees too much gore and begins to break down, imagining "the bugs are out to get [him]."
Norman Bowker
A soldier who O'Brien says attempted to save Kiowa the night he died. When Kiowa slips into the "shitfield", Bowker repeatedly tries to save him but is unable to; as a result, he feels guilty for Kiowa's death after the war. His memories continue to haunt Norman at home as he realizes that the world has moved on from the war, and wants nothing to do with the "hell" in Vietnam. He is continually haunted by the fact that he could not save Kiowa from sinking under the "shitfield" on a rainy night. However, O'Brien admits eventually that Norman did not fail to save Kiowa, that was fictional, and it is implied that O'Brien himself was the one who could not save him. After the war he briefly assists O'Brien in writing a story about Vietnam, but he hangs himself with a jump rope in an Iowa YMCA facility, leaving no note and his family shocked.
Henry Dobbins
Machine gunner. A man who, despite having a rather large frame, is gentle and kind. He is very superstitious; as a result, he wears his girlfriend's pantyhose around his neck as a protective "charm", even after she dumps him. He briefly contemplates becoming a monk after the war due to their acts of charity.
Kiowa
A compassionate and talkative soldier; he demonstrates the importance of talking about one's problems and traumatic experiences. He is also a devout Baptist and a Native American who occasionally feels contempt and distrust towards white people. However, he appears to be Tim O'Brien's best friend in the company. Kiowa often helps other soldiers deal with their actions, such as taking the lives of other human beings. He is eventually killed when camping out in the "shitfield."
Mitchell Sanders
He is the radiotelephone operator for the platoon. Like O'Brien, he is also a storyteller and is portrayed as a mentor.
Ted Lavender
A grenadier. He dies from a gunshot wound to the back of the head. He is notorious for using tranquilizers to cope with the pain of war, and for carrying a (rather large—six to eight ounces) stash of "premium dope" with him. Cross blames himself for Lavender's death, as he was fantasizing about Martha when Lavender was shot.
Curt Lemon
A young man who frequently attempts to assume the role as a tough soldier. However, he is also good friend of Rat Kiley. Lemon dies after setting off a rigged artillery shell. In one of the book's more disturbing scenes, O'Brien and Dave Jensen help clear the trees of Curt's scattered remains, during which Jensen sings "Lemon Tree" (something that "wakes [Tim] up"). After Lemon dies, Kiley writes a long, eloquent letter to Lemon's sister, describing his friendship with Lemon and emphasizing how good a person Lemon was; Lemon's sister never responds, which crushes Kiley emotionally.
Azar
A young, rather unstable soldier who engages in needless and frequent acts of brutality. In one story, he blows up an orphan puppy that Ted Lavender had adopted by strapping it to a Claymore mine, then detonating it. He also aids Tim O'Brien in gaining revenge on Bobby Jorgenson, but mocks O'Brien when he's not willing to take the revenge further. At one point, Azar breaks down emotionally, revealing that his cruelty is merely a defense mechanism.
Dave Jensen and Lee Strunk
Minor soldiers who are the main characters of "Enemies" and "Friends". Jensen fights with Strunk over a stolen jackknife, but they became uneasy friends afterwards. They each sign a pact to kill the other if he is ever faced with a "wheelchair wound". After Strunk steps on a rigged mortar round and loses a leg, he begs Jensen not to kill him. Jensen obliges, but seems to have an enormous weight relieved when he learns "Strunk died somewhere over in Chu Lai". Jensen is sometimes mentioned singing "Lemon Tree" after Curt Lemon's abrupt death. Jensen also appears in "The Lives of the Dead", where he pressures O'Brien to shake hands with a dead Vietnamese.
Bobby Jorgenson
Rat Kiley's replacement, after Rat "put a round through his foot" due to breaking under pressure. Green and terrified, he is slow to aid O'Brien when he is shot in the behind. Jorgenson nearly kills O'Brien after failing to treat him for shock. Filled with rage after his recovery, O'Brien elicits help from Azar to conspire and punish Jorgenson with a night of terrifying pranks. Later, O'Brien and Jorgenson become friends. Jorgenson may be a reference to a similarly-named character from The Caine Mutiny.

== Themes ==
Genre

The Things They Carried is a war novel. Literary Critic David Wyatt points out that O'Brien's novel is similar to the works of Wilfred Owen, Stephen Crane, George Orwell, and Ernest Hemingway. O’Brien utilizes a style of writing that combines both fiction and nonfiction together into one piece. When asked to describe how he blurs this line between the two genres, O’Brien says "I set out to write a book with the feel of utter and absolute reality, a work of fiction that would read like nonfiction and adhere to the conventions of a memoir: dedicating the book to the characters (most notably Norman Bowker and Dylan Kantesaria), using my name, drawing on my own life. This was a technical challenge. My goal was to compose a fiction with the texture, sound and authentic-seeming weight of nonfiction."

Truth vs Reality

Another theme that is highlighted in the short story "Good Form" is when the narrator makes a distinction between "story truth" and "happening truth." O’Brien talks about truth and reality in relation to the story by describing, "I can say that the book’s form is intimately connected to how I, as a human being, tend to view the world unfolding itself around me. It’s sometimes difficult to separate external 'reality' from the internal processing of that reality." O'Brien's fluid and elliptical negotiation of truth in this context finds echoes in works labeled as 'non-fiction novels'.

Imagination/Comedy

Another important theme O'Brien highlights is the emphasis on imagination and pretending. He says that this theme, "That’s an important part of my work. I’m a believer in the power of the imagination in ordinary human lives, and it’s much more important that we often credit." O'Brien goes on to say, "And that is, I think, key to why I’m a fiction writer. If that element were not present, I’d be doing nonfiction. Or I wouldn’t be a writer at all." Tim O'Brien also alludes to the difficulty in using dark comedy as a theme: "My guess is that I’ll be remembered, if I’m remembered at all, for my so-called tragedies: The Things They Carried, Going After Cacciato, If I Die in a Combat Zone and In the Lake of the Woods. Personally, I consider Tomcat in Love, if not my best book, certainly up there among the best. Yet I realize the most “literary” folks will disagree. In the end, it’s a matter of taste, I suppose. My sense of humor, which tends toward the outrageous, is plainly not for everyone."

Morality

O’Brien also shows the constant struggle of morality throughout the story during the Vietnam War. A paper from Brigham Young University highlights the conflict that soldiers face when transitioning from civilian life to soldier life in relation to morality. It states, “As demonstrated through the soldiers’ experiences with pleasure, the soldiers’ moral code must change from that of their civilian lives in order for them to find moral justification in the everyday violence war requires.” The paper goes on to acknowledge that, “In O’Brien’s The Things They Carried, the concept of morality is complicated by the treatment of violence and a connection between violence and pleasure; resultantly, morality must be defined on a spectrum rather than a binary scale.”

Belief

The theme of believing in the people around you and having reliable people with you comes from the time period being filled with people who are opposed to the action of war. This causes the people who are drafted into the mutual hate to band together to live.

== Publication ==
Before the book's publication in 1990, five of the stories: "The Things They Carried," "How to Tell a True War Story," "Sweetheart of the Song Tra Bong," "The Ghost Soldiers," and "The Lives of the Dead" were published in Esquire.

"Speaking of Courage" was originally published (in heavily modified form) as a chapter of O'Brien's earlier novel Going After Cacciato.

"The Things They Carried" was also included in the 1987 volume of The Best American Short Stories, edited by Ann Beattie and the second edition of Literature: Approaches to Fiction, Poetry, and Drama by Robert DiYanni.

== Reception ==
The Things They Carried has received critical acclaim and has been established as one of the preeminent pieces of Vietnam War literature. It has sold over 2 million copies worldwide and celebrated its 20th anniversary in 2010. It has received multiple awards such as France's Prix du Meilleur Livre Etranger Award and the Chicago Tribune Heartland Prize, as well as being a finalist for the Pulitzer Prize and National Book Critics Circle Award.

O'Brien has expressed surprise at how the book has become a staple in middle schools and high schools, stating that he "certainly hadn't imagined fourteen year-old kids and eighteen year-olds and those even in their early twenties reading the book and bringing such fervor to it, which comes from their own lives, really. The book is applied to a bad childhood or a broken home, and these are the things they're carrying. And in a way, it's extremely flattering, and other times, it can be depressing."

In 2014, the book was included in Amazon.com's list of 100 Books to Read in a Lifetime and credited as the inspiration for a National Veterans Art Museum exhibit.

It was included in the Library of Congress 2016 exhibit "America Reads" of the public’s choice of 65 of "the most influential books written and read in America and their impact on our lives".

== Adaptations ==
=== Music ===
The song Pantyhose by band TV Girl describes the plot of the chapter Stockings.

=== Film ===
The story "Sweetheart of the Song Tra Bong" was made into a film in 1998 titled A Soldier's Sweetheart, starring Kiefer Sutherland.

A film adaptation of the book, directed by Rupert Sanders and starring Tom Hardy, is currently in pre-production. Scott B. Smith is adapting the script.

=== Theatre ===
The legal rights to adapt the book into a play were awarded to James R. Stowell. The book was adapted into a play and it premiered at The History Theatre in Saint Paul, Minnesota, March 14, 2014. A second production was performed at The Lied Center, Lincoln Nebraska November 5, 2015. The stories "The Things They Carried", "On the Rainy River", "How to Tell a True War Story", "Sweetheart of the Song Tra Bong", "The Man I Killed", and "Lives of the Dead" were adapted for the theatre in March 2011 by the Eastern Washington University Theatre Department as part of the universities' Get Lit! Literary Festival in cooperation with the National Endowment for the Arts The Big Read 2011, of which The Things They Carried was the featured novel. The same department remounted the production in December 2011 for inclusion as a Participating Entry in the Kennedy Center American College Theater Festival. The production was selected as an alternate for KCACTF Region VII, as well as receiving other KCACTF honors for the production's director, actors, and production staff.

=== Games ===
Carry. A game about war. is a 2006 tabletop role-playing game designed by Nathan D. Paoletta. Its author describes it as "heavily inspired by the films Platoon and Full Metal Jacket and the novel The Things They Carried".
