= In the Lake of the Woods =

1994 novel by Tim O'Brien

- First edition cover
- Author: Tim O'Brien
- Language: English
- Genre: War, Mystery novel
- Publisher: Penguin Books
- Publication date: January 1995
- Publication place: United States
- Media type: Print (hardback & paperback)
- ISBN: 0-14-025094-8
- Preceded by: The Things They Carried (1990)
- Followed by: Tomcat in Love (1998)

In the Lake of the Woods (1994) is a novel by the American author Tim O'Brien. In the Lake of the Woods follows the struggle of Vietnam veteran John Wade trying to deal with a recently failed campaign for the United States Senate. After moving to Lake of the Woods County, Minnesota, John discovers one morning that his wife, Kathy, is missing. Through flashbacks to John's childhood, college years, and war experiences, as well as testimony and evidence from affected characters, the novel provides several hypotheses for Kathy's disappearance, without resolving the question.

It was adapted as a made-for-TV movie in 1996.

== Plot summary ==
The main storyline frequently branches into flashbacks of significant events in John Wade's past. His childhood is often portrayed as the origin of his persona, Sorcerer. As a child, John was frequently abused verbally and emotionally by an alcoholic father, who was admired by other children for his public persona. John often visited Karra's Studio of Magic, where he bought the Guillotine of Death, purchased by his father. John was devastated after his father's death and channeled his grief into magic.

Wade met his future wife Kathy during their college years, becoming intimate with her despite his secretive nature. John spied on Kathy, of which she was aware, just as he was aware of her affair with a dentist. When John was deployed to Vietnam, he and Kathy communicated through letters; some of his frightened Kathy. John became deeply absorbed in his identity as Sorcerer. He is portrayed as a member of Charlie Company, who were involved in the My Lai massacre. While working a desk job in records, John erased his involvement with the Company.

After the war, John entered politics. He was elected as lieutenant governor of Minnesota and later ran for the US Senate, with his campaign managed by the business-oriented Tony Carbo. At one point, Kathy has an abortion, despite her great wish to have a baby, because John felt that her having a child would be problematic for his political career.

After his landslide loss in the senate race, during which there was revelation of John's role in My Lai, John and Kathy take a vacation at a cabin in Lake of the Woods. They are troubled by the revelation of John's Vietnam secrets, but pretend to be happy. One night, John wakes up and decides to boil water for tea. He pours the boiling water over a few household plants, reciting "Kill Jesus". He remembers climbing back into bed with Kathy, but the next morning she's gone.

After a day of walking around the area and discovering the boat's absence, John talks to his closest neighbors, the Rasmussens. After some time they call the sheriff and organize a search party. The authorities are suspicious of John's calm demeanor and lack of participation in the search effort. Kathy's sister joins the search, and John does, too. After eighteen days, the search party is called off; the investigation into John heats up. With a boat from Claude and supplies from the Mini-Mart, John heads north on the lake. Claude is the last person to talk to John over the boat's radio and believes that he sounds disoriented.

O'Brien introduces numerous alternatives over the course of the novel. Maybe Kathy had sped over the lake too quickly, hit a rough patch of water, and had been tossed into the lake and drowned. Perhaps she had become lost in the wilderness, and ran out of supplies. Or possibly John had returned to the bedroom with the boiling water and had poured it over her face, scalding and killing her. Afterward he could have sunk the boat and body in the lake, weighed down with rocks. Or the event might have been John's last great magic trick, a disappearing act.

John and Kathy may have planned her disappearance together, intending for John to join her and their starting over. O'Brien introduces details that supports each of the possibilities and leaves conclusions up to the reader. Although the inconclusive ending irritated many readers, O'Brien argued that this is the truest way to tell a story. It is reminiscent of his book, The Things They Carried, which presents several linked stories featuring different characters and sometimes differing perceptions of the same events.

== Setting ==
The present conflict in the story occurs in late 1986, in the Northwest Angle of northern Minnesota. John and Kathy intentionally choose this setting for its isolation, which they seek to forget the stress and emotion of the failed election. The American political environment contributes to the main story conflict, as well as the interaction between Kathy and John. Through the campaign, the couple had let their relationship take backseat to solving the political issues.

As they move to Lake of the Woods to relax, John and Kathy realize that their paths have drifted farther apart than initially believed. Although John is crushed by his political loss, Kathy is secretly glad that he will no longer be distracted by the ruthless field. As the two are immersed in the wooded setting, long-time secrets begin to resurface and tensions rise.

== Characters ==
=== Main characters ===
- John Wade - A 41-year-old man at the height of his political career. The lieutenant governor of Minnesota, John was running for the U.S. Senate when details of unseemly war actions in Vietnam were revealed; he was overwhelmingly defeated in the primary.
- Kathy Wade - John's wife, has been intimately involved with him since their college days. She has stood by him despite her loathing for politics. Kathy is aware that John represses memories of his past, which arise in his dreams and subconscious. Kathy is secretly glad that he will be out of politics and more involved with her again.

=== Secondary characters ===
- An unnamed Narrator, who admits his own unreliability on several occasions. He appears to be unconnected to the Wades but obsessed with their case. He has interviewed surviving characters and built a narrative on his own speculation. He served in Vietnam during the war.
- Ruth Rasmussen, a close neighbor. When Kathy goes missing, Ruth supports John and helps him through the search effort.
- Claude Rasmussen, the husband of Ruth, acts as a friend to John. During the investigation, they become closer.
- Eleanor Wade, John's mother; she comments on his isolation as a child, as well as the transformation of his personality because of his father's abuse.
- Paul Wade, John's father, who committed suicide. Although alcoholic and often abusive, he was still idolized by John.
- Patricia S. Hood, Kathy's sister, who never trusted John. Patricia assists in the search efforts when she hears the news of her missing sister, and becomes suspicious at John's reluctance to get involved with the search.
- Arthur Lux, the sheriff of Lake of the Woods County. He heads the investigation.
- Vinny Pearson, runs the Texaco station while serving as the police.
- Myra Shaw, Vinny's cousin, reports witnessing some events with John and Kathy.
- Anthony (Tony) Carbo served as John's campaign manager through his political career.
- Sandra Karra, owns Karra's Studio of Magic. She speculated that John had a crush on her.
- The many men of Charlie Company
- PFC Weatherby, a soldier in John's Charlie Company.
- Richard Thinbill, begged for John to release information about the Vietnam events to the authorities.

== Reception ==
Verlyn Klinkenborg of the New York Times wrote that the novel contains three kinds of stories: "The first is a conventional, remote third-person account of plain facts, the events that can be reconstructed without conjecture, more or less. The second kind of story appears in several chapters called "Evidence": collections of quotations, excerpts from interviews and readings that bear on the Wade case. The third kind of story appears in chapters called "Hypothesis"; it tries to suggest what might have happened to Kathleen Wade in the days after she disappeared. But with these stories, Mr. O'Brien is also building a character, John Wade, whose inner architecture is more emblematic than personal." He writes that this "is a novel about the moral effects of suppressing a true war story, of not even trying to make things present, a novel about the unforgivable uses of history, about what happens when you try to pretend that history no longer exists."

Ellen Datlow praised the novel lavishly, saying "O'Brien continues to mine the Vietnam War and U.S. involvement in it for riches that he transmutes into art with his beautiful writing and interesting plot structure."

== Adaptations ==
It was adapted as a made-for-TV movie of the same name in 1996, directed by Carl Schenkel and starring Peter Strauss, Kathleen Quinlan, and Peter Boyle.
