= Tomcat in Love =

1998 novel by Tim O'Brien

- First edition
- Author: Tim O'Brien
- Language: English
- Genre: Campus novel, Comic novel
- Publisher: Broadway Books
- Publication date: Oct 1998
- Publication place: United States
- Media type: Print (hardcover, paperback)
- Pages: 238
- ISBN: 0-7679-0202-5
- OCLC: 60161995
- Preceded by: In the Lake of the Woods (1994)
- Followed by: July, July (2002)

Tomcat in Love is a novel by Tim O'Brien, about the misadventures of a womanizing linguistics Professor, Thomas H. Chippering, originally published in hardcover by Broadway Books, in 1998. Chippering is obsessive about proper use of the English language, and employs many examples of wordplay. Written in the first person, the tale unfolds with extensive use of flashback (what Chippering would insist be called "analepsis") and foreshadowing. However, he is an incorrigible liar, an indefatigable flirt, and completely self-centered. Tomcat in Love is more picaresque than Bildungsroman.

== Plot summary ==
As part of his irrational reaction to the end of his marriage, Thomas Chippering returns to his (fictitious) hometown, Owego, Minnesota. Emotionally spent, he trespasses on the backyard of the house where he grew up. The current resident, Mrs. Robert (Donna) Kooshof, finds him but is surprisingly attracted to him. Donna rashly agrees to participate in Tom's madcap scheme of revenge against his ex-wife (Lorna Sue), her brother (Herbie), and her new husband (known to the reader only as "the tycoon"). Tom, Lorna Sue, and Herbie have been close friends — or at least companions — since childhood. The proximate cause of Lorna Sue leaving Tom was that Herbie revealed to her that Tom has been keeping a lifelong record of his infatuations and dalliances.

While planning his revenge, Tom also maintains his position as a faculty member at the University of Minnesota. As in years past, Tom eagerly assists his female students with their writing projects, but at this point, one of these students decides to accuse Tom of sexual harassment. Tom loses his job and returns to Owego to live with Donna. Tom finds a job as an instructor at the Owego Community Day Care Center and starts teaching Shakespeare to four-year-olds.

Tom's revenge involves trying to break up Lorna Sue's new marriage by innuendo. When this goes awry, Tom plans to burn down the Zylstras' house in Owego. Tom gathers mason jars, gasoline, and firecrackers to this end. But the resolution to the plot occurs when Lorna Sue steals Tom's bombs and threatens to burn down her own house. Tom is able to get over his dependence on Lorna Sue. In the end, Tom and Donna move to a Caribbean island and live comfortably together. Tom's flirtatious nature, while not reformed, is kept in check.

There's another mysterious layer in the book. Occasionally the narrator addresses the reader directly, referring to a broken relationship that supposedly unhinges "you" (the reader) because "your" husband ran off to Fiji with a redhead. No explanation about this subplot is forthcoming.

== Characters in "Tomcat in Love" ==
=== Major characters ===
- Thomas Henry Chippering - Narrator and protagonist of the novel. "Something over forty-nine years of age. Recently divorced. Prone to late-night weeping." Nicknamed "Abe" because he is tall and skinny, Tom is Rolvaag Professor in Modern American Lexicology at the University of Minnesota. (This is a fictitious chair at a real university.) Tom has a hugely inflated opinion of himself: "With due modesty, yet truthfully, I must point out that I am not an unattractive man -- tall and craggy in the mode of certain stage actors. Virile as Secretariat. A war hero." And: "I am amply hormonal, most generously endowed, a fact upon which clever women often comment." Despite his endless flirtations, Tom admits to have bedded not more than four women. Tom thinks that his problems stem from a need for love. "So, yes, from childhood on, I had been consumed by an insatiable appetite for affection, hunger without limit, a bottomless hole inside me. I would (and will) do virtually anything to acquire love, virtually anything to keep it. I would (and will) lie for love, cheat for love, beg for love, steal for love, ghostwrite for love, seek revenge for love, swim oceans for love, perhaps even kill for love." Tom even keeps a detailed record of every flirtation and dalliance. However, a critic might well say that Tom knows nothing of love, for he is not kind nor considerate to the objects of his affections. Tom thinks of himself as a war hero because he has a Silver Star from his service in Vietnam.
- Herbie Zylstra - Tom's childhood friend and neighbour. Herbie and Tom play together as children, and it is revealed that Herbie has a destructive and sadistic streak. As a teen-ager, Herbie is accused of arson and vandalism in connection with a fire at a church. Herbie and Tom grow apart and, when Tom's marriage ends, Tom blames Herbie.
- Lorna Sue Zylstra - Tom's ex-wife and childhood sweetheart. Despite an unrepentant roving eye, Tom claims that Lorna Sue is his one and only true love. Lorna Sue is Herbie's younger sister. Lorna Sue is traumatized as a child when Herbie hammers a nail into her palm, intending to simulate crucifixion. The reader is led to believe that Herbie takes an incestuous interest in Lorna Sue, and Tom explicitly accuses Herbie and Lorna Sue of incest after Tom's marriage breaks up. In the end, it is revealed that it is Lorna Sue who was obsessively dependent on Herbie, not the other way around, and that Lorna Sue is a masochist and pyromaniac.
- Mrs. Robert Kooshof - Recent occupant of the house where Tom spent his childhood. Tom returns to his hometown to sulk after his divorce and Mrs. Kooshof, oddly attracted to him, invites him in. Tom describes her thus: "Mid-thirties. Blond hair. Blue eyes. Long legs. Busty as Nepal. One hundred fifty well-muscled pounds... a Dutch beauty only marginally tarnished by the years. A woman with substance." Tom has a hard time acknowledging her first name, which is Donna. Donna decides to hang on to Tom, despite his flaws.

=== Minor characters ===
- The Tycoon - Lorna Sue's second husband, whose name Tom has vowed never to utter. He does, however, admit he often breaks this promise in his thoughts, and reveals the tycoon's name to be Kersten. After his name is revealed, this character is referred to as "the tycoon" for most of the book.
- Ned, Velva and Earleen - Herbie and Lorna Sue's father, mother and grandmother. They still live in the house where Herbie and Lorna Sue grew up. They don't much like Tom.
- Goof, Tulip, Wildfire, Death Chant and Bonnie Prince Charming - code names for the Green Berets with whom Tom was sent on a surveillance mission during his service in Vietnam. Because Tom ordered an air strike directly on their position, they have vowed to follow him for the rest of his life, and one day to kill him. So they turn up at odd moments during the narrative. But they never carry out any of these threats against Tom.
- Toni - a female student at the University of Minnesota whose honor's thesis is ghost-written by Tom. Toni and her roommate get Tom sacked from the university.
- Mr. Chippering - Tom's father, who died of heart failure in 1957. When Tom's father brought home a turtle instead of an airplane engine for seven-year-old Tom, this was the beginning of Tom's delirious disillusionment with the world.
- Pillsbury - President of the university. When Toni and her roommate accuse Tom of sexual harassment, Pillsbury forces Tom to resign his faculty position in return for not being prosecuted.
- Robert Kooshof - Donna's husband. Originally trained as a veterinarian. At the time that Tom and Donna meet, Robert Kooshof is serving time for tax fraud. When he finds out that Donna and Tom are romantically involved, he threatens to have Tom killed. The threat is never carried out.
- Evelyn - four-year-old daughter of one of Tom's childhood classmates. Evelyn is Tom's foil, precocious, affectionate and wily. She attends the day care where Tom is hired after leaving the University of Minnesota.
- Miss Askold Wick - headmistress and chief administrator of the Owago Community Day Care Center.
