= Where Have You Gone, Charming Billy? =

1975 short story by Tim O'Brien

"Where Have You Gone, Charming Billy?" is a short story by Tim O'Brien that was written in May 1975.

== Plot ==
The main character, Paul Berlin, is in the Vietnam War. Recently, "Billy Boy" Watkins has died of a heart attack after losing a foot due to a mine. Paul is woken up by a comrade and then takes part in conversation while skirting a village, mostly talking about Watkins's death. Then there are a series of events where Paul thinks about his family back home. He constantly wishes for his parents to be proud of his valor and courage. The irony in this story includes Paul viewing the sea as a place of safety, but once he gets there, he is still unable to rid himself of the fear that embodies him.

== Summary ==
The story's main character is Private First Class Paul Berlin. The story takes place during the Vietnam War. It is Paul's first day and he is having an extremely hard time-fighting anxiety and fear. One soldier in his platoon has already died from a heart attack. He was literally scared to death. Other soldiers tell Paul that they will just get used to living in a fearful jungle. Private First Class Paul Berlin is not sure if he will ever get used to the anxiety of war. “They would have their rear guarded by three thousand miles of ocean, and they would swim and dive into the breakers and hunt crayfish and smell salt, and they would be safe... But even when he smelled salt and heard the sea, he could not stop being afraid.”

The conflicts in the story include person vs. self and person vs. society. These are shown by Paul trying to overcome his fears in the war, and by the fact that he went to war because he was drafted by the military.

== Characters ==
- Paul Berlin
- Billy Boy Watkins
- Paul's father
- Paul's mother
- Toby (Buffalo)

== Themes ==
Fear – the major theme of this story is how scary war is. Paul Berlin experiences his fears throughout the story. "Though he was afraid, he now knew that fear came in many degrees and types and peculiar categories...". Courage – Paul Berlin learns that he has to have courage if he wants to overcome his fear of the war. Although he does not overcome his fear in the story, he learns how to overcome it, and is closer to overcoming his fear. Determination – Paul has to have determination to stay strong in the war. When he could have dropped out of the terrifying war, he decides to fight through it and not give up.
