= Going After Cacciato =

1978 novel by Tim O'Brien

- First edition
- Author: Tim O'Brien
- Language: English
- Genre: War novel
- Publisher: Delacorte Press (US); Jonathan Cape (UK)
- Publication date: January 1978
- Publication place: United States
- Media type: Print (hardback & paperback)
- Pages: 352
- ISBN: 0-440-02948-1
- OCLC: 3240718
- Dewey Decimal: 813/.5/4
- LC Class: PZ4.O1362 Go PS3565.B75
- Preceded by: Northern Lights (1973)
- Followed by: The Nuclear Age (1985)

Going After Cacciato is an anti-war novel written by Tim O'Brien and first published by Delacorte Press in 1978. The novel is set during the Vietnam War. It is told from the third person limited point of view of an American soldier, Paul Berlin. Cacciato, one of Berlin's squadmates, goes absent without leave (AWOL) to walk from Vietnam to Paris. The nonlinear narrative follows Berlin's imagined chase of Cacciato across Eurasia; it is interspersed with Berlin's memories of the Vietnam War prior to Cacciato's departure.

Going After Cacciato won the 1979 U.S. National Book Award for Fiction.

== Plot and themes ==
The main conceit of Going After Cacciato is that American soldiers in Vietnam were required to walk nearly constantly; by Tim O'Brien's estimation, the total distance walked in a standard tour of duty was as far as walking in a straight line from Vietnam to Paris.

Cacciato, an American soldier who is unintelligent but self-sufficient, happy, and untroubled by the larger questions of the war, goes AWOL. He intends to walk from Vietnam to Paris. Cacciato is pursued by Paul Berlin and the rest of the squad.

The protagonist, Paul Berlin, is a frustrated American soldier. While on watch duty one night, Berlin thinks about the past and daydreams about going to Paris. He remembers Cacciato's desertion and imagines a journey in which Cacciato made it successfully to Paris, pursued by Berlin and the squad the entire way. The courage it takes to chase one's dreams is a recurring theme which is often expressed through Paul Berlin's reveries.

Typical of many stories that deal with themes of psychological trauma, Going After Cacciato is ambiguous about the nature, order, and reality of events that occur. The chronology is nonlinear for most of the book. Surreal events occur, such as Cacciato flying off a mountain, or the squad falling into an endless tunnel complex and, finding no exit, simply deciding to fall out of the tunnels to escape.

== Characters ==
- Paul Berlin - Narrator and protagonist, Paul Berlin imagines the prolonged chase after Cacciato. In his mind, Cacciato and Berlin's squad eventually reach Paris.
- Cacciato - The soldier from Berlin's squad who goes AWOL with the intention of reaching Paris. Cacciato is frequently described by his squadmates as unintelligent and he is shown to be dangerously unconcerned in combat. His first name is not known; Cacciato is his last name, meaning "hunted" or "caught" in Italian.
- Sarkin Aung Wan - A Burmese refugee, and later Berlin's romantic interest, who saves the squad many times as she accompanies them on the journey to Paris.
- Doc Peret - The medic in Berlin's squad. He sometimes uses M&M's as medicine for those under his care, usually as a way to calm down the over-reactive and the dying. He enjoys philosophical debates.
- Oscar Johnson - A Black soldier in Berlin's squad. He says that the cold weather in Vietnam reminds him of Detroit in the month of May, which he calls "lootin' weather." It is implied that despite his posturing and claims, Johnson is not from Detroit: his mail comes from and goes to Maine, he cannot name recent players from any Detroit sports teams, and one of his nicknames is "the nigga from Ba Haba." Johnson is responsible for convincing the squad that Lieutenant Martin must be killed.
- Lieutenant Sidney Martin - The West Point-educated previous lieutenant of the platoon containing Berlin's squad. Martin insists on following military standard operating procedures (SOPs). One of the official SOPs he follows is the process of searching tunnels prior to collapsing them with explosives; the unofficial but widely accepted procedure is to simply collapse the tunnels without searching them. Martin firmly enforces the official SOP, leading to the deaths of Frenchie Tucker and Bernie Lynn. The squad's refusal to search tunnels solidifies after the deaths and they attempt to plead with Martin, but he sternly restates that they must search tunnels before collapsing them. In the end, all the men in the squad agree to kill Martin. The circumstances of Martin's death are not specified except that it occurs while he is in the tunnels. It is repeatedly implied that Oscar Johnson fragged Martin.
- Frenchie Tucker - A soldier who dies in a tunnel after being shot through the nose.
- Bernie Lynn - A soldier who is fatally shot below the throat when he tries to retrieve Frenchie Tucker from the tunnel.
- Lieutenant Corson - Frequently referred to simply as "the lieutenant", Corson takes command of the platoon containing Berlin's squad after Lieutenant Martin dies. Corson is a career soldier who has been demoted from captain to lieutenant twice. He is nominally the commanding officer of Berlin's squad as they follow Cacciato, though he is often ill with dysentery. As the soldiers move west from Vietnam through Asia and Europe, Corson feels he is too old for the war and wants to return to his home. Doc diagnoses Corson as suffering from nostalgia and homesickness. When the squad stops in the Indian city of Delhi, Corson is temporarily cured when he meets a woman, a married hotelier who had studied in Baltimore, Maryland. He becomes sick again when the squad moves on.
- Stink Harris - A violent soldier who leads Berlin's squad and suffers from ringworm.
- Harold Murphy - A soldier in Berlin's squad who carries an M60 machine gun. Early on, Murphy leaves the mission to retrieve Cacciato since he feels it is pointless.
- Eddie Lazzutti - A soldier in Berlin's squad who is proud of his voice and so typically carries the squad's radio.
- Captain Fahyi Rhallon - An officer of the Iranian SAVAK who arrests the squad in Tehran.
- Billy Boy Watkins - A soldier from Berlin's squad who dies on the first day Berlin sees combat. Watkins dies after he stepped on a defective land mine which severs his foot. Although not mortally wounded, Watkins enters a state of shock and dies. Doc Peret claims Watkins died of fright. The death of Watkins is frequently referred to and jokes about by the soldiers, sometimes accompanied by a short song that the squad sung about his death. The jokes and songs the squad make about Watkins demonstrate how the soldiers cope with the death around them by morphing tragedy into comedy to lessen their fear.
- Buff - A soldier whose nickname is short for "Water Buffalo". Buff is known for his big size. He dies while the platoon is trying to cross a field. Berlin commonly refers to his death as "life after death" because Buff's face remains in his helmet after he is killed.
- Jim Pederson - A religious soldier who distributes pictures of Jesus Christ to villagers. He is afraid of flying, and after a hard descent in a Chinook helicopter, a disoriented Pederson wades through a rice paddy with his eyes closed. He steps into the line of fire of the Chinook's door gunners and is shot multiple times. As Pederson dies, he attempts to shoot down the departing Chinook with his M16 rifle.
- Ready Mix - A soldier who had died during the assault of a hill in the Highlands. No one knew his real name; a common superstition among soldiers in Vietnam was that it was best not to get to know people who might die at any time.
- Rudy Chassler - A soldier who dies after stepping on a land mine.
- Ben Nystrom - A soldier who shot himself in the foot to ensure he would be discharged from active duty.
- Vaught - A soldier who is discharged from service after losing an arm to infection from a self-inflicted bayonet wound.

== Style ==
The Famous Authors website writes, "His incorporation of metaphysical approach attributed a rich quality to his writing style. ... According to him, sometimes the fictional truth is more realistic than [the] factual one. It is because fictional truth appeals to the emotion and feelings which makes the literature more meaningful."

As a Study Guide notes, the story is told in the third person from Paul Berlin's point of view. Paul Berlin's narrative jumps from his current situation to a (possibly) imaginary observation post where he is on guard duty, to another imaginary trip from Vietnam to Paris, chasing a deserter named Cacciato. Berlin's last name suggests the divisions in his thinking, moods, and desires; Berlin, Germany was divided by the victorious powers following World War II, and remained so at the time of the novel's writing.

Readers have found many passages puzzling; the LitCharts editors explain, "There are scenes in the novel that seem extremely realistic, scenes that require the suspension of disbelief, and some scenes that are nothing short of impossible — indeed, the plot of the book itself (a group of US soldiers travels all the way from Vietnam to Paris in search of a soldier from their platoon who has wandered off) sounds like a fairy tale. ... The issue, then, is understanding O'Brien's blend of the believable and the unbelievable, and incorporating it into our comprehension of the book... One of the most common phrases critics used to describe Going After Cacciato, at least at the time, was 'magical realism.'"

An example occurs in Chapter 36 (entitled, fittingly, "Flights of Imagination")

A miracle, Paul Berlin kept thinking. It was all he wanted -- a genuine miracle to confound natural law, a baffling reversal of the inevitable consequences. ... A miracle, he thought, and closed his eyes and made it happen. And then a getaway car -- why not? It was a night of miracles, and he was a miracle man. So why not? Yes, a car. Cacciato pointed at it, shouted something, then disappeared.

The reality of Cacciato himself has been put in doubt by some critics. Interior evidence suggests that Paul Berlin might be conflating Cacciato with himself. Paul thinks that

There was something curiously unfinished about Cacciato. Open-faced and naive and plump, Cacciato lacked the fine detail, the refinements and final touches, that maturity ordinarily marks on a boy of seventeen years. The result was blurred and uncolored and bland. You could look at him then look away and not remember what you'd seen.

He also sees Cacciato's face in the moon floating above the squad and as "fuzzy, bobbing in and out of mist" (p. 10) -- pretty much in any environment in which Paul Berlin finds himself.

Paul Berlin occasionally finds himself explaining or translating for Cacciato. When the men first leave their post and first spot Cacciato in the mountains, they see through binoculars that he opens his mouth to speak; then thunder roars. The other soldiers speculate that Cacciato is trying to emulate a chicken, trying to squawk and fly. It is Paul who tells the lieutenant that what Cacciato said was "Good-bye." (p. 11)

Florman and Kestler argue that "At many points, it's suggested that the story of Berlin's journey from Vietnam to Paris — in other words, the plot of the novel we're reading — is a story Berlin is telling himself as a way of coping with his fear and anxiety. It's as if the more fantastic parts of the book are playing out in one man's head — not because he believes they could really happen, but because he needs to believe in something."

== Critical reception ==
Richard Freedman, writing in The New York Times and suggesting that Cacciato is a Christ figure, said, "By turns lurid and lyrical, Going After Cacciato combines a surface of realistic war reportage as fine as any in Michael Herr's recent Dispatches with a deeper feel -- perhaps possible only in fiction -- of the surrealistic effect war has on the daydreams and nightmares of the combatants. To call Going After Cacciato a novel about war is like calling Moby Dick a novel about whales." Freedman sees influences by Ernest Hemingway and says, "...far from being a high-minded, low-voltage debate on the rights and wrongs of Vietnam, Going After Cacciato is fully dramatized account of men both in action and escaping from it."

== See also ==
- The Things They Carried
