= Northern Lights (O'Brien novel) =

1975 novel by Tim O'Brien

- First edition
- Author: Tim O'Brien
- Cover artist: Bob Antler
- Language: English
- Publisher: Delacorte Press (US)
- Publication date: August 1975
- Publication place: United States
- Media type: Print (hardback & paperback)
- Preceded by: If I Die in a Combat Zone, Box Me Up and Ship Me Home (1973)
- Followed by: Going After Cacciato (1978)

Northern Lights is the debut novel of Tim O'Brien. The novel, originally published in August 1975, focuses on the relationship of two brothers. Much of the plot is set during a cross-country ski trip.

== Reception ==
Initial reviews of Northern Lights were mixed, but many critics noted the heavy influence of Ernest Hemingway upon the style, mood, and tone of the novel. One critic observed that O’Brien’s writing style in this novel is a “deliberate parody” of Hemingway.

Upon its publication in 1975, Kirkus Reviews wrote that:

”The very earnestness and clapboard verisimilitude of this first novel, manifested in speech that marks time rather than bringing events and personality to the flood, rescues the heavy-handed symbolism. It's a long, slow trek, but worth going the distance.”

Alasdair Maclean, in the Times Literary Supplement, concluded that "O'Brien's ambition outreaches his gifts."

At the time of its publication, Northern Lights was generally seen as a promising debut novel from a young writer. After a 50 year writing career (as of 2023), it’s now viewed as perhaps O’Brien’s most flawed book.
