= Simone van der Vlugt =

Dutch writer

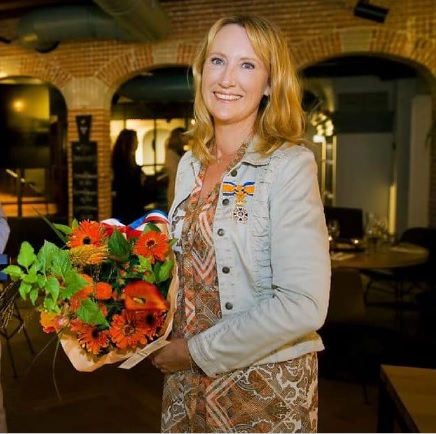
Simone van der Vlugt.

Simone van der Vlugt (born 15 December 1966) is a Dutch writer, known there for her historical and young adult novels. She has also written for younger children, and adults. Several of her crime novels have been published in English.

== Biography ==
Van der Vlugt (née Watertor) was born in Hoorn and started writing at an early age, submitting her first manuscript to a publisher at 13 years of age. Her first published novel (The Amulet, 1995, a historical novel about witch persecution, for children) was written while working as a secretary at a bank. She went on to write ten further historical novels for young adults.

In 2004 Van der Vlugt wrote her first novel for adults, The Reunion, a psychological suspense thriller. This was followed by another six standalone crime novels. In 2012 she started a series of detective stories featuring Lois Elzinga, based in Alkmaar.

Van der Vlugt lives with her husband and two children in Alkmaar.

== Bibliography ==
=== Crime thrillers ===
- 2004 De Reünie (translated as The Reunion, 2009)
- 2005 Schaduwzuster (translated as Shadow Sister, 2011)
- 2007 Het laatste offer (The Final Sacrifice)
- 2008 Blauw water (Blue Water, translated as Safe as Houses, 2013)
- 2009 Herfstlied (Autumn Song)
- 2010 Op klaarlichte dag (In Broad Daylight)
- 2011 In mijn dromen (In My Dreams)

=== Lois Elzinga detective series ===
- 2012 Aan niemand vertellen (Tell No One)
- 2013 Morgen ben ik weer thuis (Tomorrow I'll Be Back Home)
- 2014 Vraag niet waarom (Don't Ask Why)

=== Historical novels ===
- 2009 Jacoba, dochter van Holland (Jacoba, daughter of Holland)
- 2012 Rode sneeuw in december (Red Snow in December)
- 2016 Nachtblauw (Midnight Blue)
- 2019 Schilderslief
