= If I Die in a Combat Zone, Box Me Up and Ship Me Home =

1973 book by Tim O'Brien

- First edition
- Author: Tim O'Brien
- Language: English
- Subject: Vietnam War autobiography
- Genre: Memoir
- Publisher: Delacorte Press
- Publication date: 1973
- Publication place: United States
- Media type: Print
- ISBN: 0-7679-0443-5
- OCLC: 41211584
- Dewey Decimal: 959.704/3/092 21
- LC Class: DS559.5 .O27 1999
- Preceded by: n/a
- Followed by: Northern Lights (1975)

If I Die in a Combat Zone, Box Me Up and Ship Me Home (sometimes printed as If I Die In A Combat Zone or incorrectly as If I Die in a Combat Zone, Box Me Up and Send Me Home) is an autobiographical account of Tim O'Brien's tour of duty in the Vietnam War. It was published in 1973 in the United States by Delacorte and in Great Britain by Calder and Boyars Ltd. It has subsequently been reprinted by multiple publishers under both titles.

== Synopsis ==
O'Brien takes the reader through a typical day in the life of a soldier in Vietnam. We are briefly introduced to a small number of fellow 'grunts' and the commanding officer of Alpha Company, the rifle company O'Brien was assigned to, one Captain Johansen. (Names and physical characteristics depicted in the book were changed.)

Rather than proceed chronologically, O'Brien takes the reader back to the beginning of his induction into the US Army. The reader learns about the author's home town, Worthington, Minnesota, to which O'Brien moved when he was 9 years old. We are led through his childhood, playing various army games, and learning about World War II from returned veterans and the Korean War which was taking place at the time.

The story of his tour itself continues to unfold while the reader is simultaneously taken through O'Brien's training at Fort Lewis, Washington, where he acquaints a man of similar situation named Erik. Together, the two decide to engage in a psychological resistance against the government.

After debating over the idea of desertion, O'Brien arrives in Vietnam in 1969 and spends a week at a base in Chu Lai (home to the Americal Division from approximately 1967 until 1971), receiving last-minute training such as mine sweeping and grenade throwing as well as the essential do's and don'ts of jungle warfare, before being sent to Landing Zone Gator in Quang Ngai Province where he is assigned to Alpha company, 5th Battalion of the 46th Infantry, 198th Infantry Brigade.

O'Brien describes his time in Alpha Company and the various events that took place during his time there, as well as some of the people he encountered. Among the scenarios O'Brien describes is one about the various mines that are encountered by the infantrymen, and the indiscriminate way that these devices disfigure and maim both combatants and civilians.

Not long after the accidental shelling of a lagoon village by the A Battery, 1st Battalion, 14th Field Artillery Regiment, that Alpha Company was protecting (near an American firebase), O'Brien is offered a job at the rear and is airlifted away from the fighting, where he encounters a rear echelon officer, Major Callicles (battalion executive officer), who deals with the investigation into the My Lai Massacre committed by the Charlie Company of the same battalion. The memoir ends with O'Brien being flown home.

== Reception ==
If I Die in a Combat Zone, Box Me Up and Ship Me Home received positive reviews from critics. Observed by the Washington Star as possibly "the single greatest piece of work to come out of Vietnam", with equally positive reviews from The Guardian, Gloria Emerson of the New York Times and was described as a personal account of "aching clarity... A beautiful, painful book," by the New York Times Book Review. Similar reviews were given from The Times, The Washington Post, The Sunday Times, The Financial Times and Time Magazine who cited O'Brien as "Perhaps the best writer about Vietnam".

== Publication data ==
- If I Die in a Combat Zone, Box Me Up and Ship Me Home
  - Delacorte Press, 1973, hardcover: ISBN 0-440-03853-7
  - Calder and Boyars, 1973 hardcover: ISBN 0-7145-1006-8
  - Delta, 1989 paperback: ISBN 0-385-29774-2
  - Laurel, 1992 mass market paperback: ISBN 0-440-34311-9
  - Flamingo (Paladin Books), 1995 paperback: ISBN 0-586-08799-0
  - Broadway, 1999 paperback: ISBN 0-7679-0443-5 (popular edition)
  - Sagebrush, 2001 library binding: ISBN 0-613-08043-2
  - Flamingo, 2003 reprint: ISBN 0-00-716299-5

== Notes ==
The rock band Big Country references the words "If I die in a combat zone / Box me up and ship me home" in the song Where The Rose Is Sown, as do The Screaming Blue Messiahs in their song Someone To Talk To as released on the Peel Sessions EP.

The title phrase "If I die in a combat zone, box me up and ship me home" is a military marching cadence, dating back to the Second World War. Cadences such as "C-130 rolling down the strip" and "If I die in the combat zone" are also used by the United States Marine Corps. The full stanza that is most commonly used in these cadences goes " If i die in a combat zone, box me up and ship me home, pin my medals upon my chest, tell my momma I done my best."

== Recommended reading ==
- Tobey C. Herzog, Writing Vietnam, Writing Life: Caputo, Heinemann, O'Brien, Butler
