= July, July =

2002 novel by Tim O'Brien

- First edition
- Author: Tim O'Brien
- Language: English
- Genre: Fiction
- Publisher: Houghton Mifflin (US)
- Publication date: 2002
- Publication place: United States
- Media type: Print (hardback & paperback)
- ISBN: 9780618039692
- OCLC: 50417083
- Preceded by: Tomcat in Love (1998)
- Followed by: Dad’s Maybe Book (2019)

July, July (2002) is a novel by Tim O'Brien.

== Plot summary ==
July, July is set in 2000, and members of the Darton Hall College class of 1969 are gathered, one year behind schedule, for their 30th reunion. Focusing on a dozen characters and life's pivotal moments rather than on a linear plot, O'Brien follows the ensemble cast (which includes a Vietnam vet, a draft dodger, a minister, a bigamous housewife and a manufacturer of mops) for whom "the world had whittled itself down to now or never," as they drink, flirt and reminisce. Interspersed are tales of other moments when each character experienced something that changed him or her forever. Jumping across decades, O'Brien reveals past loves and old betrayals that still haunt: Dorothy failed to follow Billy to Canada; Spook hammered out a "double marriage"; Ellie saw her lover drown; Paulette, in a moment of desperation, disgraced herself and ruined her career.
