= Tim O'Brien (author) =

American novelist (born 1946)

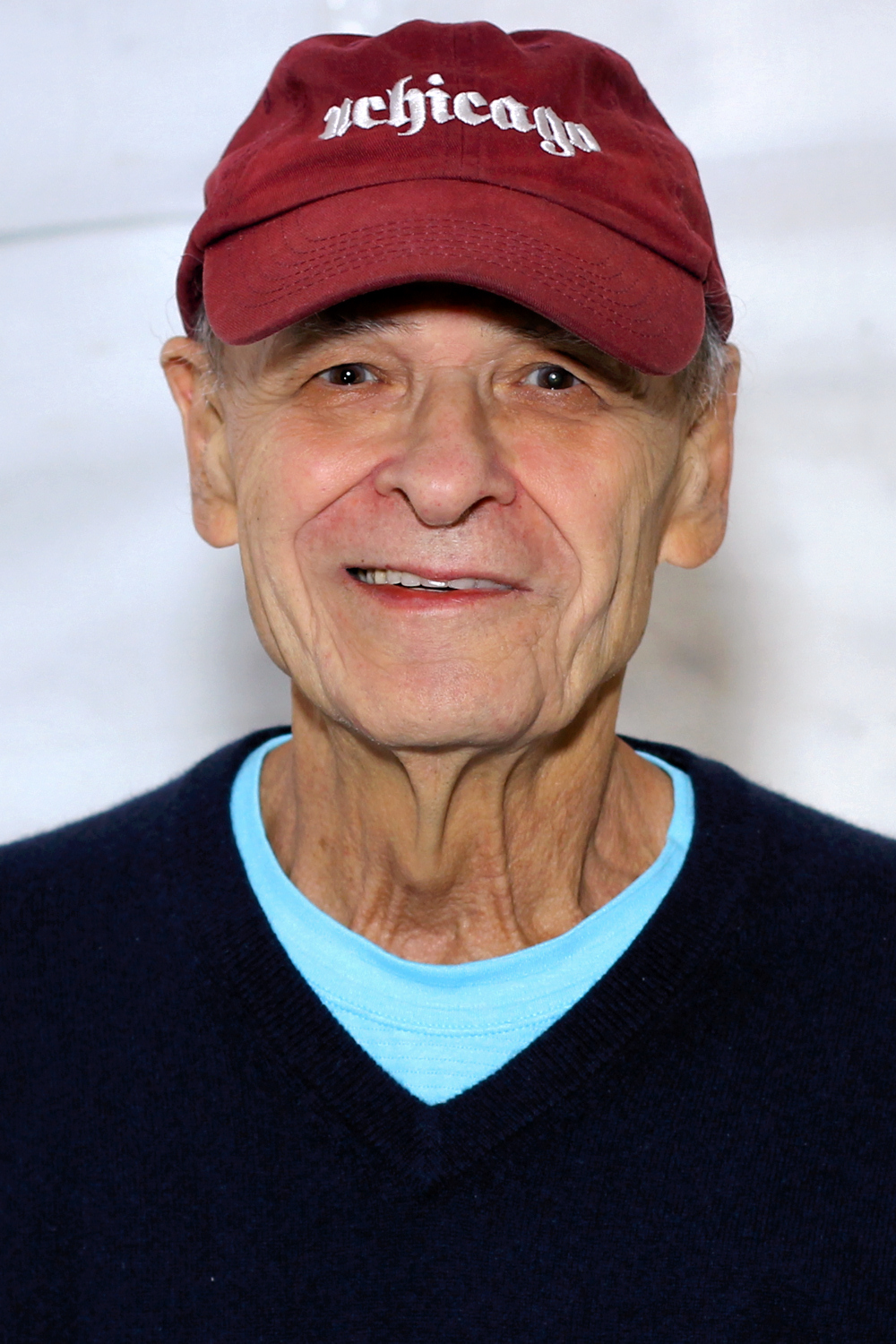
- O'Brien at the 2023 Texas Book Festival
- Born: William Timothy O'Brien Jr. October 1, 1946 (age 80); Austin, Minnesota, U.S.
- Education: Macalester College; Harvard University
- Occupations: Novelist; short story writer; teacher
- Spouse: Meredith Baker
- Children: 2
- Writing career
- Years active: 1973–present
- Genres: Memoirs, war stories, short stories
- Notable works: If I Die in a Combat Zone; Going After Cacciato; The Things They Carried
- Military career
- Allegiance: United States of America
- Branch: United States Army
- Service years: 1968–1970
- Rank: Sergeant
- Units: 3rd Platoon, Company A, 5th Battalion, 46th Infantry Regiment; 198th Infantry Brigade
- Conflicts: Vietnam War
- Awards: Purple Heart

Tim O'Brien (born October 1, 1946) is an American author who served as a soldier in the Vietnam War. Much of his writing is about wartime Vietnam, and his work later in life often explores the postwar lives of its veterans.

O'Brien is perhaps best known for his book The Things They Carried (1990), a collection of linked semi-autobiographical short stories inspired by his wartime experiences. It was a finalist for the Pulitzer Prize for Fiction and a 2006 New York Times poll named it one of the best works of American fiction of the last twenty-five years. In 2010, the paper described it as "a classic of contemporary war fiction". His war novel Going After Cacciato (1978) was awarded the National Book Award.

O'Brien taught creative writing, holding the endowed chair at the MFA program of Texas State University–San Marcos every other academic year from 2003 to 2012.

== Biography ==
=== Early life ===
Tim O'Brien was born in Austin, Minnesota, on October 1, 1946, the son of William Tim O'Brien and Ava Eleanor Schult O'Brien. When he was ten, his family – including a younger brother and sister – moved to Worthington, Minnesota. Worthington had a large influence on O'Brien's imagination and his early development as an author. The town is on Lake Okabena in the southwestern part of the state and serves as the setting for some of his stories.

O'Brien earned his BA in 1968 in political science from Macalester College, where he was student body president. That same year he was drafted into the United States Army and was sent to Vietnam.

=== Military service ===
He served from 1968 to 1970 in 3rd Platoon, Company A, 5th Battalion, 46th Infantry Regiment, part of the 23rd Infantry Division that contained the unit that perpetrated the My Lai Massacre the year before his arrival. O'Brien has said that when his unit got to the area around My Lai (referred to as "Pinkville" by the U.S. forces), "we all wondered why the place was so hostile. We did not know there had been a massacre there a year earlier. The news about that only came out later, while we were there, and then we knew." O'Brien earned a Purple Heart after being struck by shrapnel during a grenade attack.

In later talks and essays, O'Brien has described how conflicted he felt when he was drafted. Growing up, he said he often felt both restless and shaped by its conservative civic culture. Opposed to the Vietnam War, he spent the summer of 1968 working in a meatpacking plant, which he described as physically exhausting and emotionally draining, while he worried about his draft notice. O'Brien has recalled feeling pulled in two directions: toward his anti-war convictions on one side and, on the other, toward family expectations, hometown loyalties, and fear of being seen as a coward if he refused to serve. In his public lectures, he uses this period to illustrate the moral pressure many draftees experienced as they decided whether to enter the Army, resist the draft, or leave the country.

=== First book ===
Upon completing his tour of duty, O'Brien went to graduate school at Harvard University. Afterward he received an internship at the Washington Post. In 1973 he published his first book, a memoir, If I Die in a Combat Zone, Box Me Up and Ship Me Home, about his war experiences. In it, O'Brien writes: "Can the foot soldier teach anything important about war, merely for having been there? I think not. He can tell war stories."

=== Teaching and professional work ===
O'Brien has taught at Texas State University–San Marcos, where he offers workshops in the MFA program. He has also been involved in the Bread Loaf Writers' Conference. At Bread Loaf, he was engaged with a range of literary traditions that allowed him to shape the work of writers beyond the university setting.

After the birth of his first child, O'Brien quit writing entirely to focus on fatherhood. Later, O'Brien returned to writing with Dad's Maybe Book, titled by his son, Tad. Dad's Maybe Book is about and for his sons, in which O'Brien reflects on storytelling as a form of connection across generations.

=== Personal life ===
As of 2010, O'Brien lived in central Texas, where he raised a family. He has two sons and a daughter. His two sons were born when he was 56 and 58 respectively.

O'Brien's papers are housed at the Harry Ransom Center at the University of Texas at Austin.

== Style, themes and influences ==
O'Brien has described his early interest in storytelling as influenced by his family history, particularly his father's published accounts of World War II.

In the story "Good Form," from his collection of semi-autobiographical stories, The Things They Carried, O'Brien discusses the distinction between "story-truth" (the truth of fiction) and "happening-truth" (the truth of fact or occurrence), writing that "story-truth is sometimes truer than happening-truth." The technique has allowed O'Brien to divulge emotional truths through his writing, even when the reality may not suggest it.

This demonstrates one aspect of O'Brien's writing style: a blurring of the usual distinction between fiction and reality, in that the author uses details from his own life, but frames them in a self-conscious or metafictional narrative voice.

By the same token, certain sets of stories in The Things They Carried seem to contradict each other, and certain stories are designed to "undo" the suspension of disbelief created in previous stories. For example, "Speaking of Courage" is followed by "Notes", which explains in what ways "Speaking of Courage" is fictional. This is another example of how O'Brien blurs the traditional distinctions we make between fact and fiction.

In The True War Story: Ontological Reconfiguration in the War Fiction of Kurt Vonnegut and Tim O'Brien, Jason Michael Aukerman argues that some veteran authors "desire to communicate truth through fiction" and that this choice "hints at a new perspective on reality and existence that may not be readily accepted or understood by those who lack combat experience". Aukerman maintains that acknowledging "a multiplicity of realities exists" allows readers to better understand the perspectives conveyed in veteran war fiction.

O'Brien's The Things They Carried reflects this ontological distinction through its treatment of truth and storytelling. In "Good Form," O'Brien states, "A thing may happen and be a total lie; another thing may not happen and be truer than the truth," distinguishing between factual occurrence and experiential meaning. He further explains, "I want you to know why story-truth is truer sometimes than happening-truth," explicitly separating emotional truth from historical accuracy. These statements correspond to Aukerman's claim that veteran war fiction often comes from an altered understanding of reality shaped by combat experience.Throughout The Things They Carried, O'Brien emphasizes the instability of experience through repetition and fragmented narration. In the opening chapter, he describes the soldiers as carrying not only physical items but also "all the emotional baggage of men who might die." This phrasing shifts attention away from external action and toward internal states shaped by fear, anticipation, and uncertainty. Aukerman notes that veteran authors frequently resist "orderly and purposeful" depictions of war because it reflects civilian assumptions rather than combat reality. O'Brien's focus on ordinary moments and emotional weight reflects this resistance.

The difficulty of communicating war experience to civilians recurs throughout the text. In "How to Tell a True War Story," O'Brien asserts that "a true war story is never moral" and warns that if a story seems to offer uplift or meaning, "you have been made the victim of a very old and terrible lie." He further explains, "In many cases a true war story cannot be believed," advising readers that "if you believe it, be skeptical." Aukerman states that O'Brien uses this as a tool to highlight the distance between civilian and veteran perspectives, but also, through evoking emotion, show the realities that feel uncomfortable or disturbing to those without direct experience. O'Brien repeatedly complicates memory and presents trauma as ongoing rather than an event and feelings confined to the past. In "Speaking of Courage," memories of combat intrude into the present, while in "The Lives of the Dead," O'Brien writes, "stories can save us," explaining that "in a story, which is a kind of dreaming, the dead sometimes smile and sit up and return to the world." Aukerman describes this combination of past and present as a feature of post-war ontology, in which traumatic experience continues to shape perception and understanding over time. O'Brien's non-linear structure reflects this condition by presenting memory as recursive rather than sequential.

O'Brien's narrative frequently draws attention to its own instability. In "How to Tell a True War Story," he explains that "it's difficult to separate what happened from what seemed to happen," noting that "what seems to happen becomes its own happening." By openly questioning reliability, O'Brien resists the idea of a single, collective war narrative. Aukerman characterizes this instability as a deliberate feature of veteran war stories, arguing that it reflects the limits of conventional narrative forms when applied to combat experience. Taken together, The Things They Carried reflects what Aukerman describes as the "true war story," which communicates the experiences of soldiers through uncertainty rather than through factual certainty or linear progression.

=== Reception ===
The Things They Carried was a finalist for the Pulitzer Prize for Fiction. O'Brien's work has been the subject of extensive scholarly and critical attention. Armstrong argues that O'Brien's stylistic experimentation—particularly his blending of autobiography with fiction—reshaped expectations of modern war literature and positioned him as one of the most influential interpreters of Vietnam War trauma. Critics emphasize that O'Brien's focus on emotional truth, rather than factual recounting, has significantly impacted how contemporary writers and scholars understand war narratives.

Early reception of The Things They Carried highlighted its departure from traditional war narratives. Coffey's Publishers Weekly profile described O'Brien's work as groundbreaking in its experimentation with linked stories, repetition, and self-reflexive narration. These structural choices were understood as efforts to communicate the psychological weight of combat.

O'Brien's interviews reinforce the scholarly interpretation of his aims. In a 2010 discussion, he reflected on the challenges of conveying wartime experience and the role of storytelling in shaping memory. His comments offer insight into how he understands narrative truth, supporting critical claims that his work intentionally blurs boundaries between lived experience and fiction.

Scholars such as Ciocia and Herzog argue that O'Brien's narrative uncertainty and focus on emotional authenticity fundamentally reshaped the expectations of modern war literature. By merging memory, imagination, and metafiction, O'Brien expanded the genre's capacity to explore moral ambiguity and psychological complexity. His storytelling philosophy—centered on the belief that emotional truth can surpass factual truth—has influenced later writers who similarly emphasize interiority over chronology.

O'Brien's work is also frequently discussed alongside Kurt Vonnegut in scholarship that examines how postmodern techniques challenge conventional war narratives. Aukerman argues that O'Brien's use of fragmentation, contradictory narrators, and ontological instability constitutes a form of "ontological reconfiguration" that redefines what makes a war story "true." A 2006 New York Times poll to determine the best work of American fiction of the last twentyfive years saw The Things They Carried receive multiple votes. In the accompanying essay, A. O. Scott noted that the works that dominated the list were sweeping historical narraatives. In contrast, he likened O'Brien's book to Marilynne Robinson's Housekeeping: "These are brilliant books, but they are also careful, small and precise. They do not generalize; they document."

=== Influence ===
Tim O'Brien's influence on contemporary literature extends well beyond the Vietnam War. His narrative techniques, thematic concerns, and reflections on storytelling have shaped how later writers approach subjects such as conflict, identity, and memory. Herzog notes that many contemporary authors writing about Iraq and Afghanistan draw on O'Brien's techniques, particularly his reliance on layered narration and reflective storytelling.

O'Brien has also influenced writers outside of war literature. His blending of genres and his emphasis on self-questioning, inconsistent narrators appear in works of creative nonfiction, autobiographical fiction, and postmodern novels.

Beyond literary circles, O'Brien's influence appears in cultural conversations about how Americans remember the Vietnam War. His works provide accessible yet complex depictions of the soldier's experience, and readers often turn to his stories as a way of understanding not only the war itself but also the emotional consequences it left behind.

== Personal views on the Vietnam War ==
While O'Brien does not consider himself a spokesman for the Vietnam War, he has occasionally commented on it. Speaking years later about his upbringing and the war, O'Brien described his hometown as "a town that congratulates itself, day after day, on its own ignorance of the world: a town that got us into Vietnam. Uh, the people in that town sent me to that war, you know, couldn't spell the word 'Hanoi' if you spotted them three vowels."

Contrasting the continuing American search for U.S. MIA/POWs in Vietnam with the reality of the high number of Vietnamese war dead, he describes the American perspective as

A perverse and outrageous double standard. What if things were reversed? What if the Vietnamese were to ask us, or to require us, to locate and identify each of their own MIAs? Numbers alone make it impossible: 100,000 is a conservative estimate. Maybe double that. Maybe triple. From my own sliver of experience—one year at war, one set of eyes—I can testify to the lasting anonymity of a great many Vietnamese dead.

O'Brien was interviewed for Vietnam: The Ten Thousand Day War as well as Ken Burns's 2017 documentary series The Vietnam War.

== Awards and honors ==
- If I Die in a Combat Zone, Box Me Up and Ship Me Home was named the Outstanding Book of 1973 by the New York Times.
- O'Brien won the 1979 National Book Award for his novel Going After Cacciato.
- O'Brien received the Vietnam Veterans of America Excellence in the Arts Award in 1987
- His novel In the Lake of the Woods won the James Fenimore Cooper Prize for Best Historical Fiction in 1995.
- In August 2012, O'Brien received the Dayton Literary Peace Prize Foundation's Richard C. Holbrooke Distinguished Achievement Award. In June 2013, O'Brien was awarded the $100,000 Pritzker Military Library Literature Award.
- In 2010, O'Brien received the honorary Doctor of Humane Letters (L.H.D.) from Whittier College.

His military awards included

== Works ==
=== Novels ===
- Northern Lights (1975) ISBN 9780440066644
- Going After Cacciato (1978) ISBN 9780385283496
- The Nuclear Age (1985) ISBN 9780394542867
- The Things They Carried (1990) ISBN 9780618706419
- In the Lake of the Woods (1994) ISBN 9780140250947
- Tomcat in Love (1998) ISBN 9780767902021
- July, July (2002) ISBN 978-0-547-52372-9
- America Fantastica (2023) ISBN 9780063318502

=== Memoirs ===
- If I Die in a Combat Zone, Box Me Up and Ship Me Home (1973) ISBN 9780767904438
- Dad's Maybe Book (2019) ISBN 9780618039708

=== Other works ===
- "Where Have You Gone, Charming Billy?" (1975) - short story
