= We Could Connect or We Could Not =

Studio album by Lismore
- Released: August 24, 2004 (United States); February 22, 2005 (CA)/(UK)
- Recorded: 2003
- Genre: Ambient Glitch/Electro
- Length: 52:54
- Label: Eighth Dimension/Cult Hero

Professional ratings
Review scores
Source	Rating
Allmusic	3.5/5 stars

We Could Connect or We Could Not is the debut album from electro glitch band Lismore. This album was recorded in 2003 at Flight in Jersey City, NJ. It had its American release in 2004 and its United Kingdom and Canadian releases in 2005.

== Track listing ==
1. "Tremolo" – 5:05
2. "Pour un Ancien Ami" – 4:43
3. "Cut" – 4:29
4. "This Time " – 4:05
5. "Blood Bank " – 3:27
6. "One Room House " – 5:40
7. "Finest Hour" – 4:40
8. "Come Undone" – 3:54
9. "Someday It Will End" – 1:24
10. "Aika Miura" – 4:17
11. "Tonight" – 5:21
12. "Angelize" – 5:49
