= Lismore (band) =

- Origin: New York City, United States
- Genres: Electro
- Years active: 2004–2008
- Labels: Cult-Hero
- Members: Penelope Trappes; Stephen Hindman
- Past members: Ingrid Dahl; Damon Gray

Lismore was an electronic music group formed by vocalist Penelope Trappes and composer/instrumentalist Stephen Hindman in 2004. The group uses both live instruments and programmed beats to achieve their sound.

== Members ==
- Penelope Trappes (vocals)
- Stephen Hindman (programming, guitars)

== History ==
Two next door neighbors, Australian-born Penelope and Ohio-bred Stephen, an ex dj/producer (Kingsize), blindly began making electronic pop songs together unwittingly creating their acclaimed glitchy debut CD, We Could Connect Or We Could Not. As 'You Aint No Picasso' said: "Lismore sound like a wicked collaboration between Ladytron and Daft Punk."

Lismore had been playing in NYC and extensively touring the US and Canada throughout 2005, 2006, 2007 and 2008, and is no longer an active band.

== Discography ==
=== Albums ===
- We Could Connect or We Could Not (2005)

=== EPs ===
- It Takes Guts To Deceive So Eloquently (2006)
- All That You Are EP (2007)
