= Chandler, Minnesota =

- City
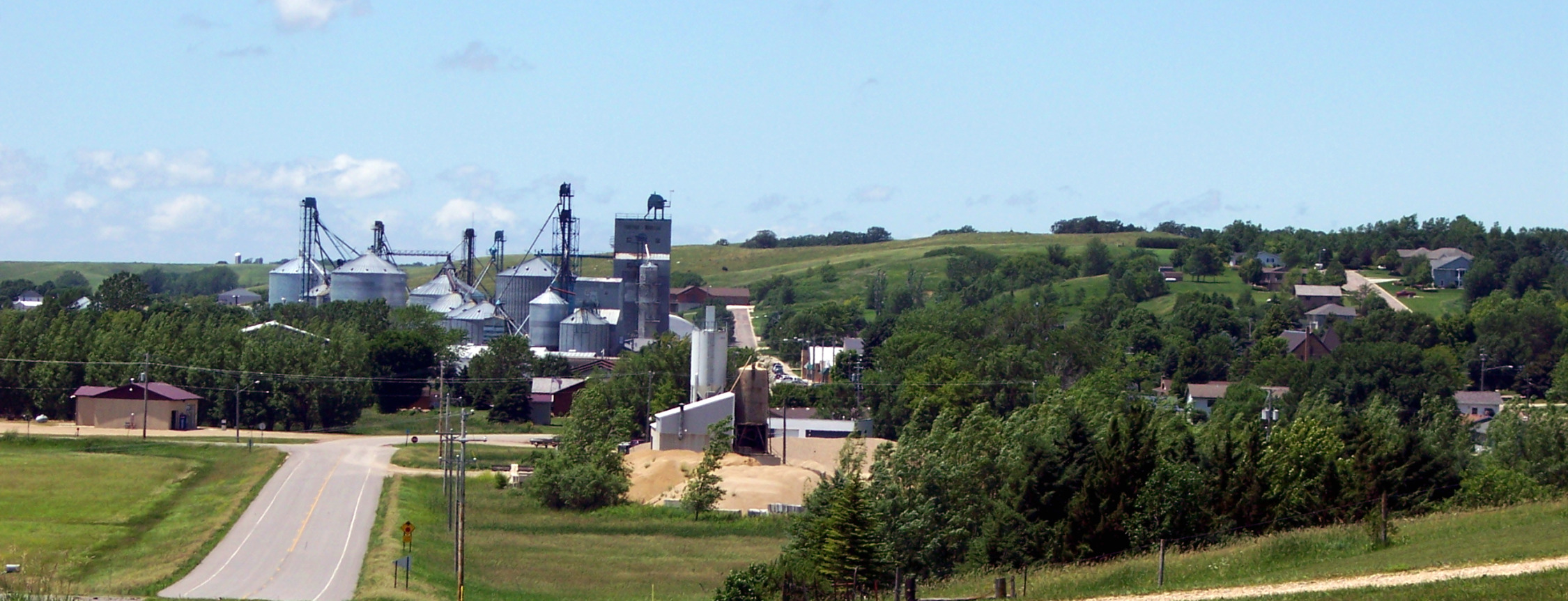
- A view (from the east) of a portion of Chandler
- Motto: "In God we trust"
- Location in Murray County and the state of Minnesota
- Coordinates: 43°55′50″N 95°57′04″W
- Country: United States
- State: Minnesota
- County: Murray

Government
  - Type: Mayor − Council
  - Mayor: Don Vogel

Area
  - Total: 0.79 sq mi (2.05 km^{2})
  - Land: 0.79 sq mi (2.05 km^{2})
  - Water: 0 sq mi (0.00 km^{2})
- Elevation: 1,693 ft (516 m)

Population (2020)
  - Total: 279
  - Density: 353/sq mi (136.2/km^{2})
- Time zone: UTC-6 (Central (CST))
  - Summer (DST): UTC-5 (CDT)
- ZIP code: 56122
- Area code: 507
- FIPS code: 27-10900
- GNIS feature ID: 2393798
- Website: www.cityofchandlermn.com

Chandler is a town in Murray County, Minnesota, United States. The population was 279 at the 2020 census.

Main Highways in the area include:

- MN-91
- Murray County HWY - 4
- Murray County HWY - 103
- Murray County HWY - 5

== History ==
A post office has been in operation at Chandler since 1886. The city was named for John Alonzo Chandler, a railroad official.

Chandler Air Force Station was located just south of town from 1951 though 1969, home to 787th Aircraft Control and Warning Squadron.

On June 16, 1992, Chandler was struck by a devastating F5 tornado that completely destroyed half of the town, most of which has since been rebuilt.

The Fenton Wind Farm, a 137-turbine wind farm near Chandler, became operational in 2007.

== Geography ==
Chandler is in southwestern Murray County, bordered to the south and west by Moulton Township, to the east by Fenton Township, to the northeast by Leeds Township, and to the north by Chanarambie Township. Minnesota State Highway 91 passes through the east side of the city, leading north 5 miles (8 km) to Lake Wilson and south 20 miles (32 km) to Adrian. Slayton, the Murray county seat, is 13 miles (21 km) to the northeast. Murray County Roads 4 and 5 are additional routes in the community.

According to the U.S. Census Bureau, Chandler has a total area of 0.79 square miles (2.05 km^{2}), all of it recorded as land. Chanarambie Creek passes through the south side of the city, flowing west to the Rock River, a tributary of the Big Sioux River, at Edgerton.

== Economy ==
3 notable companies in the city are:

- Monogram Foods
- Chandler Feed - Provides feed and agronomy services for Southwest Minnesota with a small chain of locations in Edgerton, Hardwick, Leota, Woodstock and Pipestone
- Chandler Co-op - Also provides agronomy services, fuel/convenience store stations, and vehicle repair.

Other Companies in the town also include; Schurr Concrete, State Bank Of Chandler, Chandler State Agency, Action Signs and Billboards, Chandler Machine Shop, and more.

== Demographics ==
Historical population
Census	Pop.	Note	%±
1910	225		—
1920	272		20.9%
1930	250		−8.1%
1940	363		45.2%
1950	331		−8.8%
1960	388		17.2%
1970	319		−17.8%
1980	344		7.8%
1990	316		−8.1%
2000	276		−12.7%
2010	270		−2.2%
2020	279		3.3%
U.S. Decennial Census

=== 2010 census ===
As of the census of 2010, there were 270 people, 109 households, and 75 families living in the city. The population density was 346.2 inhabitants per square mile (133.7/km^{2}). There were 120 housing units at an average density of 153.8 per square mile (59.4/km^{2}). The racial makeup of the city was 88.9% White, 0.7% African American, 9.6% from other races, and 0.7% from two or more races. Hispanic or Latino of any race were 22.6% of the population.

There were 109 households, of which 32.1% had children under the age of 18 living with them, 57.8% were married couples living together, 6.4% had a female householder with no husband present, 4.6% had a male householder with no wife present, and 31.2% were non-families. 26.6% of all households were made up of individuals, and 19.3% had someone living alone who was 65 years of age or older. The average household size was 2.48 and the average family size was 3.01.

The median age in the city was 41 years. 24.1% of residents were under the age of 18; 8.5% were between the ages of 18 and 24; 23.7% were from 25 to 44; 21.5% were from 45 to 64; and 22.2% were 65 years of age or older. The gender makeup of the city was 50.4% male and 49.6% female.

=== 2000 census ===
As of the census of 2000, there were 276 people, 113 households, and 72 families living in the city. The population density was 342.7 inhabitants per square mile (132.3/km^{2}). There were 121 housing units at an average density of 150.2 per square mile (58.0/km^{2}). The racial makeup of the city was 97.46% White, 1.81% from other races, and 0.72% from two or more races. Hispanic or Latino of any race were 17.39% of the population.

There were 113 households, out of which 24.8% had children under the age of 18 living with them, 57.5% were married couples living together, 3.5% had a female householder with no husband present, and 35.4% were non-families. 33.6% of all households were made up of individuals, and 26.5% had someone living alone who was 65 years of age or older. The average household size was 2.44 and the average family size was 3.14.

In the city, the population was spread out, with 24.6% under the age of 18, 8.7% from 18 to 24, 19.2% from 25 to 44, 20.3% from 45 to 64, and 27.2% who were 65 years of age or older. The median age was 43 years. For every 100 females, there were 102.9 males. For every 100 females age 18 and over, there were 87.4 males.

The median income for a household in the city was $26,875, and the median income for a family was $38,542. Males had a median income of $30,417 versus $20,000 for females. The per capita income for the city was $16,134. About 6.8% of families and 15.1% of the population were below the poverty line, including 27.3% of those under the age of eighteen and 14.0% of those 65 or over.

== Politics ==
Chandler is located in Minnesota's 7th congressional district, represented by Republican Michelle Fischbach. At the state level, Chandler is located in Senate District 22, represented by Republican Bill Weber, and in House District 22A, represented by Republican Joe Schomacker.
