= Hadley, Minnesota =

City in Minnesota, United States

- City
- Location in Murray County and the state of Minnesota
- Coordinates: 43°59′55″N 95°51′23″W
- Country: United States
- State: Minnesota
- County: Murray

Government
  - Type: Mayor − Council
  - Mayor: Rick Like

Area
  - Total: 0.41 sq mi (1.06 km^{2})
  - Land: 0.29 sq mi (0.76 km^{2})
  - Water: 0.12 sq mi (0.30 km^{2})
- Elevation: 1,686 ft (514 m)

Population (2020)
  - Total: 54
  - Density: 183.5/sq mi (70.84/km^{2})
- Time zone: UTC-6 (Central (CST))
  - Summer (DST): UTC-5 (CDT)
- ZIP code: 56151
- Area code: 507
- FIPS code: 27-26450
- GNIS feature ID: 2394266
- Website: cityofhadley.com

Hadley (/ˈhædliː/, HAD-lee) is a city in Murray County, Minnesota, United States. The population was 54 at the 2020 census.

== History ==
Hadley was founded as "Summit Lake" on October 31, 1879. A post office with the name "Hadley" was established in 1880. It was incorporated as a village on September 1, 1903.

== Geography ==
Hadley is in western Murray County and is surrounded by Leeds Township. It has a latitude of 44°00'N and a longitude of 95°51'W. Minnesota State Highway 30 runs along the southern border of the city, leading east 5 miles (8 km) to Slayton, the county seat, and west 23 miles (37 km) to Pipestone. Murray County Road 29 runs north-south through the center of Hadley.

According to the U.S. Census Bureau, the city has a total area of 0.41 square miles (1.06 km^{2}), of which 0.29 square miles (0.75 km^{2}) are land and 0.11 square miles (0.28 km^{2}), or 27.9%, are water. Summit Lake occupies the southern part of the city.

== Demographics ==
Historical population
Census	Pop.	Note	%±
1880	22		—
1910	136		—
1920	147		8.1%
1930	105		−28.6%
1940	162		54.3%
1950	139		−14.2%
1960	151		8.6%
1970	119		−21.2%
1980	137		15.1%
1990	94		−31.4%
2000	81		−13.8%
2010	61		−24.7%
2020	54		−11.5%
U.S. Decennial Census

=== 2010 census ===
As of the census of 2010, there were 61 people, 32 households, and 20 families residing in the city. The population density was 217.9 inhabitants per square mile (84.1/km^{2}). There were 38 housing units at an average density of 135.7 per square mile (52.4/km^{2}). The racial makeup of the city was 100.0% White.

There were 32 households, of which 12.5% had children under the age of 18 living with them, 50.0% were married couples living together, 12.5% had a female householder with no husband present, and 37.5% were non-families. 37.5% of all households were made up of individuals, and 15.6% had someone living alone who was 65 years of age or older. The average household size was 1.91 and the average family size was 2.40.

The median age in the city was 56.2 years. 6.6% of residents were under the age of 18; 9.7% were between the ages of 18 and 24; 13.2% were from 25 to 44; 40.9% were from 45 to 64; and 29.5% were 65 years of age or older. The gender makeup of the city was 45.9% male and 54.1% female.

=== 2000 census ===
As of the census of 2000, there were 81 people, 36 households, and 27 families residing in the city. The population density was 292.7 inhabitants per square mile (113.0/km^{2}). There were 38 housing units at an average density of 137.3 per square mile (53.0/km^{2}). The racial makeup of the city was 100.00% White.

There were 36 households, out of which 22.2% had children under the age of 18 living with them, 69.4% were married couples living together, 5.6% had a female householder with no husband present, and 25.0% were non-families. 25.0% of all households were made up of individuals, and 11.1% had someone living alone who was 65 years of age or older. The average household size was 2.25 and the average family size was 2.67.

In the city, the population was spread out, with 17.3% under the age of 18, 7.4% from 18 to 24, 17.3% from 25 to 44, 27.2% from 45 to 64, and 30.9% who were 65 years of age or older. The median age was 48 years. For every 100 females, there were 113.2 males. For every 100 females age 18 and over, there were 109.4 males.

The median income for a household in the city was $31,406, and the median income for a family was $31,667. Males had a median income of $30,536 versus $16,429 for females. The per capita income for the city was $22,518. None of the population or the families were below the poverty line.

== Politics ==
Hadley is located in Minnesota's 7th congressional district, represented by Michelle Fischbach, a Republican. At the state level, Hadley is located in Senate District 22, represented by Republican Bill Weber, and in House District 22A, represented by Republican Joe Schomacker.

Presidential election results

Presidential elections results
Year	Republican	Democratic	Third parties
2020	40.0% 16	55.0% 22	5.0% 2
2016	33.3% 12	58.3% 21	8.4% 3
2012	22.2% 8	72.2% 26	5.6% 2
2008	27.1% 13	68.9% 33	4.0% 2
2004	21.7% 10	76.1% 35	2.2% 1
2000	20.0% 9	73.3% 33	6.7% 3
