= Dovray, Minnesota =

City in Minnesota, United States

- City
- Location in Murray County and the state of Minnesota
- Coordinates: 44°03′16″N 95°32′52″W
- Country: United States
- State: Minnesota
- County: Murray

Government
  - Type: Mayor − Council
  - Mayor: Herb Hansen

Area
  - Total: 0.25 sq mi (0.64 km^{2})
  - Land: 0.25 sq mi (0.64 km^{2})
  - Water: 0 sq mi (0.00 km^{2})
- Elevation: 1,513 ft (461 m)

Population (2020)
  - Total: 58
  - Density: 230/sq mi (90/km^{2})
- Time zone: UTC-6 (Central (CST))
  - Summer (DST): UTC-5 (CDT)
- ZIP code: 56125
- Area code: 507
- FIPS code: 27-16300
- GNIS feature ID: 2394556

Dovray is a city in Murray County, Minnesota, United States. The population was 58 at the 2020 census.

== History ==
Dovray was platted in 1904, and named from its location in Dovray Township.

== Geography ==
Dovray is in eastern Murray County, 14 miles (23 km) northeast of Slayton, the county seat. It is located within section 20 of Dovray Township but is an independent municipality. Minnesota State Highway 30 runs along the southern border of the city, leading west 6 miles (10 km) to Currie and east the same distance to Westbrook. County Road 42 runs along the eastern border of Dovray, and County Road 11 passes to the north of the city.

According to the U.S. Census Bureau, Dovray has a total area of 0.25 square miles (0.65 km^{2}), all land.

== Demographics ==
Historical population
Census	Pop.	Note	%±
1930	103		—
1940	128		24.3%
1950	127		−0.8%
1960	113		−11.0%
1970	104		−8.0%
1980	87		−16.3%
1990	60		−31.0%
2000	67		11.7%
2010	57		−14.9%
2020	58		1.8%
U.S. Decennial Census

=== 2010 census ===
As of the census of 2010, there were 57 people, 31 households, and 16 families residing in the city. The population density was 228.0 inhabitants per square mile (88.0/km^{2}). There were 38 housing units at an average density of 152.0 per square mile (58.7/km^{2}). The racial makeup of the city was 98.2% White and 1.8% from two or more races. Hispanic or Latino of any race were 1.8% of the population.

There were 31 households, of which 9.7% had children under the age of 18 living with them, 45.2% were married couples living together, 3.2% had a female householder with no husband present, 3.2% had a male householder with no wife present, and 48.4% were non-families. 32.3% of all households were made up of individuals, and 22.6% had someone living alone who was 65 years of age or older. The average household size was 1.84 and the average family size was 2.31.

The median age in the city was 59.5 years. 5.3% of residents were under the age of 18; 3.6% were between the ages of 18 and 24; 22.9% were from 25 to 44; 36.9% were from 45 to 64; and 31.6% were 65 years of age or older. The gender makeup of the city was 43.9% male and 56.1% female.

=== 2000 census ===
As of the census of 2000, there were 67 people, 33 households, and 23 families residing in the city. The population density was 268.0 inhabitants per square mile (103.5/km^{2}). There were 36 housing units at an average density of 144.0 per square mile (55.6/km^{2}). The racial makeup of the city was 95.52% White, and 4.48% from two or more races.

There were 33 households, out of which 18.2% had children under the age of 18 living with them, 60.6% were married couples living together, 3.0% had a female householder with no husband present, and 30.3% were non-families. 24.2% of all households were made up of individuals, and 15.2% had someone living alone who was 65 years of age or older. The average household size was 2.03 and the average family size was 2.35.

In the city, the population was spread out, with 13.4% under the age of 18, 7.5% from 18 to 24, 14.9% from 25 to 44, 28.4% from 45 to 64, and 35.8% who were 65 years of age or older. The median age was 54 years. For every 100 females, there were 81.1 males. For every 100 females age 18 and over, there were 81.3 males.

The median income for a household in the city was $37,500, and the median income for a family was $41,875. Males had a median income of $32,188 versus $16,875 for females. The per capita income for the city was $17,461. There were no families and 13.1% of the population living below the poverty line, including no under eighteens and 11.8% of those over 64.

== Politics ==
Dovray is located in Minnesota's 7th congressional district, represented by Collin Peterson, a Democrat. At the state level, Dovray is located in Senate District 22, represented by Republican Doug Magnus, and in House District 22A, represented by Republican Joe Schomacker.
