= Wirock, Minnesota =

- Unincorporated community
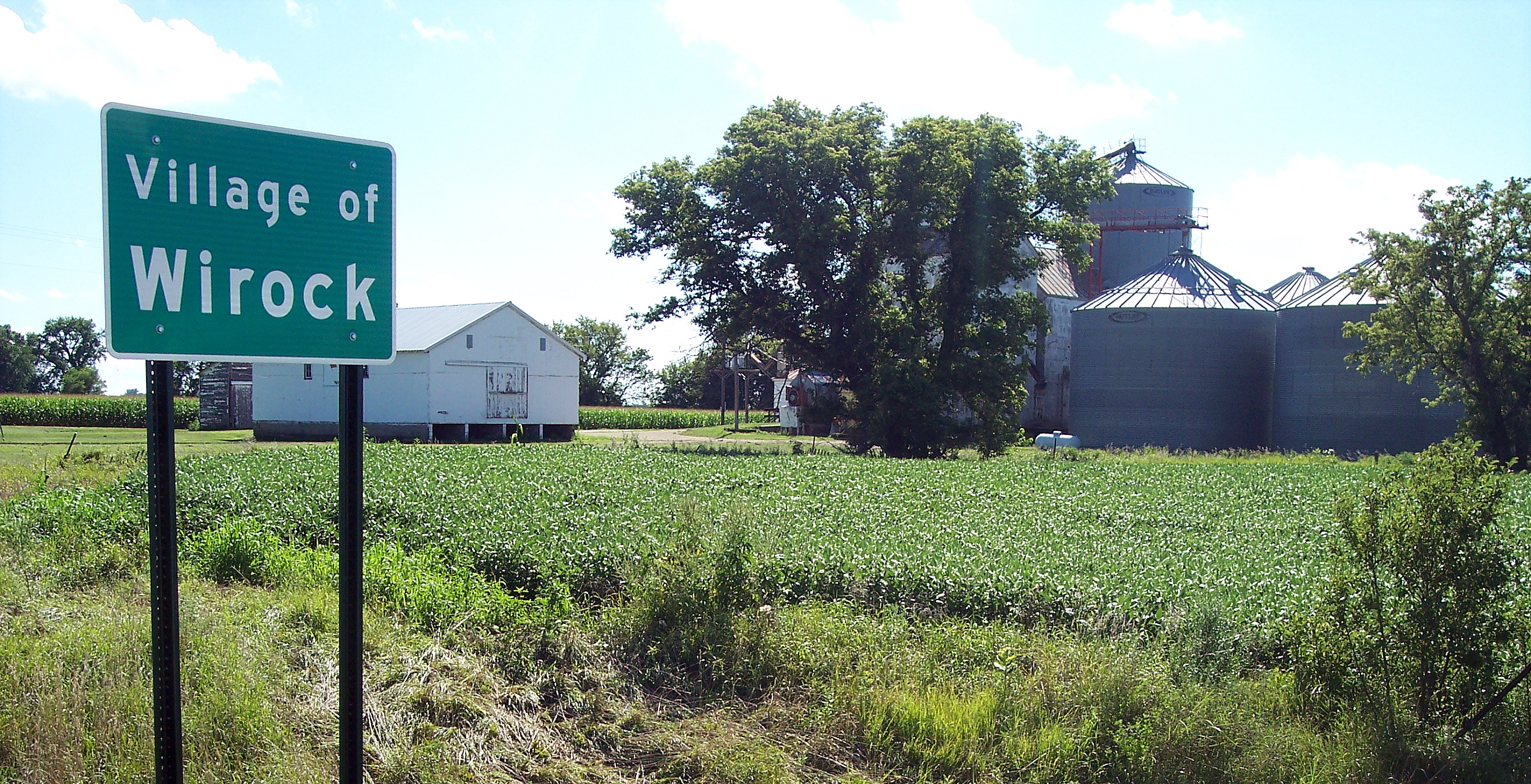
- A portion of Wirock

- Location within Minnesota Location within the United States
- Coordinates: 43°53′13″N 95°42′13″W
- Country: United States
- State: Minnesota
- County: Murray
- Townships: Bondin; Iona
- Elevation: 1,575 ft (480 m)
- Time zone: UTC-6 (Central (CST))
  - Summer (DST): UTC-5 (CDT)
- ZIP code: 56131
- Area code: 507
- GNIS feature ID: 654284

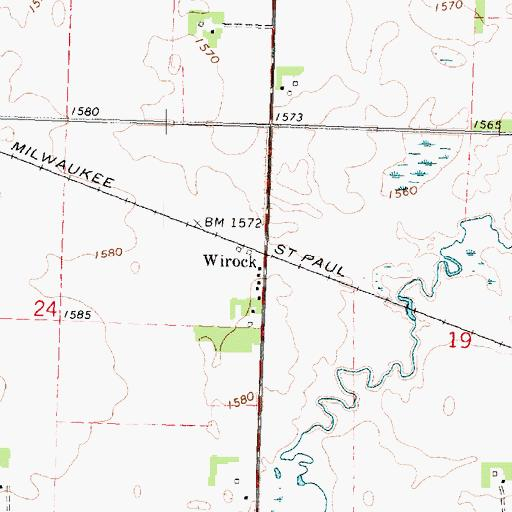
Topographic map of Wirock

Herman Weirauch family, namesake of the community

Wirock is an unincorporated community between Bondin and Iona townships in Murray County, Minnesota, United States. It is located 5 miles (8 km) west-northwest of Fulda and approximately 4 miles (6 km) southeast of Iona.

== History ==
Platt map of Wirock from 1909

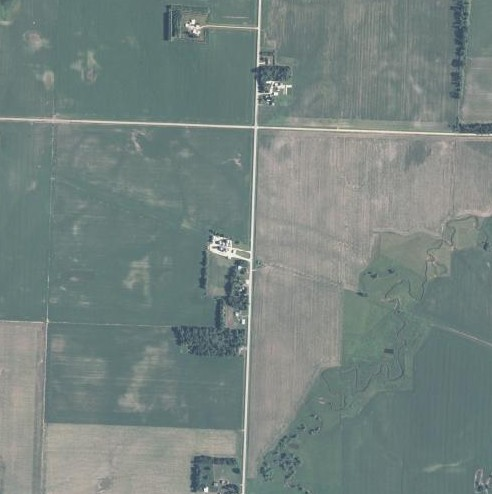
Satellite photo of Wirock. Path of former railroad tracks can still be clearly seen.

Wirock, is located largely within the northeast quarter of Section 24 of Iona Township. The village was named after the Herman Weirauch family, and was named Wirock because it was thought that it would be easier to pronounce than Weirauch.

In 1906 Mr. Weirauch deeded two acres of land to the Chicago, Milwaukee and St. Paul Railroad for a side track. He deeded an additional seven acres in 1907 for a town to be built. Streets and alleys were drawn out, named and filed at the courthouse.

Peter Brynes built the first elevator in 1907. A second elevator was constructed in 1913.

Charles Wendling opened the first grocery store in Wirock in 1909. A second grocery store was built in about 1920. It was larger and not only served as a general store but also as a produce and cream station. Mr. P. J. Nelson put in the first stock of groceries and dry goods. Operators in later years were Tebbe Basche, Reiner Bruns and Vance Scott.

The depot and blacksmith shop were built about the same time as the second grocery store building. John Uttech operated the blacksmith shop, hardware store and post office. After Uttech left, the post office was moved into the store building.

The story is told that there were some who called Wirock "Buttinsky" because they felt that Wirock was organized to "butt in" on Iona and Fulda.

Wirock was the last village established in Murray County, and suffered the general decline of so many other small communities. Use of the railroad line declined in the 1960s, and by 1969, Wirock’s railroad depot had been moved to Pioneer Village in Worthington, Minnesota, to become part of that historic prairie town exhibit. The railroad tracks were torn up in the 1980s. Little of the original village remains today
