= Minnesota State Highway 267 =

State highway in Minnesota, United States

Trunk Highway 267
- MN 267 highlighted in red

Route information
- Maintained by MnDOT
- Length: 5.353 mi (8.615 km)
- Existed: July 1, 1949–present

Major junctions
- South end: CSAH 4 at Iona
- North end: MN 30 near Slayton

Location
- Country: United States
- State: Minnesota
- Counties: Murray

Highway system
- Minnesota Trunk Highway System; Interstate; US; State; Legislative; Scenic
← MN 264	→ MN 269

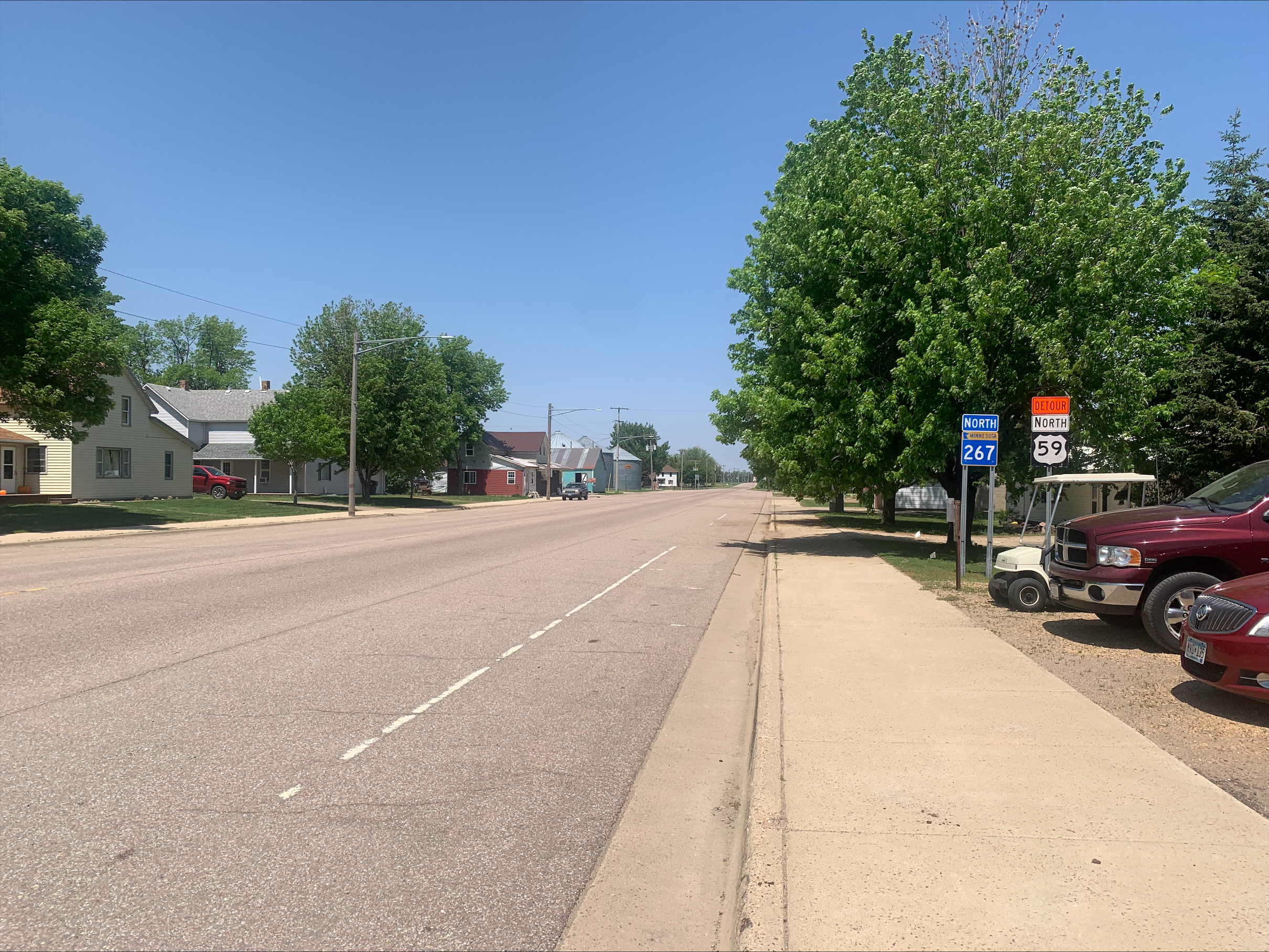
Minnesota State Highway 267 looking northbound in Iona, Minnesota

Minnesota State Highway 267 (MN 267) is a 5.353-mile-long (8.615 km) highway in southwest Minnesota, which runs from its intersection with Murray County State-Aid Highway 4 (Grace Avenue) in Iona and continues north to its northern terminus at its intersection with State Highway 30, 1.5 miles west of Slayton.

== Route description ==
Highway 267 serves as a north–south connector route in southwest Minnesota between Iona and State Highway 30 near Slayton.

Highway 267 follows Parnell Street in Iona.

It passes by the runway for the Slayton Municipal Airport near its northern terminus.

The route is legally defined as Route 267 in the Minnesota Statutes.

== History ==
Highway 267 was authorized on July 1, 1949.

The route was paved in 1951.

The 2021 Minnesota Legislature authorized removal of the route, to become effective when a turnback agreement is reached with Murray County.

== Major intersections ==
The entire route is in Murray County.

Location	mi	km	Destinations	Notes
Iona	0.000	0.000	CSAH 4 (Grace Avenue/Parnell Street)	
Slayton Township	2.348	3.779	CSAH 49 west, CSAH 32 east (71st Street)	
Slayton Township	4.354	7.007	CSAH 7 east (91st Street)	
Slayton Township	5.360	8.626	MN 30 – Slayton, Lake Wilson	
1.000 mi = 1.609 km; 1.000 km = 0.621 mi
