= Iona Township, Minnesota =

Iona Township is the name of some places in the U.S. state of Minnesota:

- Iona Township, Murray County, Minnesota
- Iona Township, Todd County, Minnesota

== See also ==
- Iona Township (disambiguation)
