= Dovray Township, Murray County, Minnesota =

Dovray Township, Minnesota
- Township
- Location within the state of Minnesota Dovray Township, Minnesota (the United States)
- Coordinates: 44°3′29″N 95°30′56″W
- Country: United States
- State: Minnesota
- County: Murray

Area
  - Total: 35.7 sq mi (92.4 km^{2})
  - Land: 35.3 sq mi (91.5 km^{2})
  - Water: 0.35 sq mi (0.9 km^{2})
- Elevation: 1,430 ft (436 m)

Population (2000)
  - Total: 67
  - Density: 4.7/sq mi (1.8/km^{2})
- Time zone: UTC-6 (Central (CST))
  - Summer (DST): UTC-5 (CDT)
- ZIP code: 56125
- Area code: 507
- FIPS code: 27-16318
- GNIS feature ID: 0663998

Dovray Township is a township in Murray County, Minnesota, United States. The population was 167 at the 2000 census. Dovray is located in Southwest Minnesota on the eastern side of Murray County. It is five minutes from Currie, fifteen minutes from Lake Shetek State Park, and twenty minutes northeast of Slayton.

Dovray Township was organized in 1879, and named after Dovre in Norway.

== Geography ==
According to the United States Census Bureau, the township has a total area of 35.7 square miles (92 km^{2}), of which 35.3 square miles (91 km^{2}) is land and 0.4 square miles (1.0 km^{2}) (1.04%) is water.

== Demographics ==
As of the census of 2000, there were 167 people, 71 households, and 49 families residing in the township. The population density was 4.7 inhabitants per square mile (1.8/km^{2}). There were 81 housing units at an average density of 2.3 per square mile (0.89/km^{2}). The racial makeup of the township was 100.00% White.

There were 71 households, out of which 26.8% had children under the age of 18 living with them, 64.8% were married couples living together, and 29.6% were non-families. 23.9% of all households were made up of individuals, and 11.3% had someone living alone who was 65 years of age or older. The average household size was 2.35 and the average family size was 2.80.

In the township the population was spread out, with 22.2% under the age of 18, 7.2% from 18 to 24, 19.8% from 25 to 44, 29.3% from 45 to 64, and 21.6% who were 65 years of age or older. The median age was 46 years. For every 100 females, there were 153.0 males. For every 100 females age 18 and over, there were 132.1 males.

The median income for a household in the township was $35,694, and the median income for a family was $37,222. Males had a median income of $25,625 versus $28,438 for females. The per capita income for the township was $20,242. None of the families and 1.2% of the population were living below the poverty line.

== Politics ==
Dovray Township is located in Minnesota's 1st congressional district, represented by Mankato educator Tim Walz, a Democrat. At the state level, Dovray Township is located in Senate District 22, represented by Republican Doug Magnus, and in House District 22A, represented by Republican Joe Schomacker.
