= Current Lake, Minnesota =

- Unincorporated community
- Location within Minnesota Location within the United States
- Coordinates: 44°08′19″N 95°56′36″W
- Country: United States
- State: Minnesota
- County: Murray
- Township: Ellsborough
- Elevation: 1,667 ft (508 m)
- Time zone: UTC-6 (Central (CST))
  - Summer (DST): UTC-5 (CDT)
- Area code: 507
- GNIS feature ID: 654660

Current Lake is an unincorporated community in Ellsborough Township, Murray County, Minnesota, United States. The most southwestern fur trading post in Minnesota was not far from here.
