= Iona, Minnesota =

City in Minnesota, United States

- City
- Location in Murray County and the state of Minnesota
- Coordinates: 43°54′56″N 95°46′59″W
- Country: United States
- State: Minnesota
- County: Murray

Government
  - Type: Mayor - Council

Area
  - Total: 0.78 sq mi (2.01 km^{2})
  - Land: 0.78 sq mi (2.01 km^{2})
  - Water: 0 sq mi (0.00 km^{2})
- Elevation: 1,631 ft (497 m)

Population (2020)
  - Total: 166
  - Density: 213.6/sq mi (82.47/km^{2})
- Time zone: UTC-6 (Central (CST))
  - Summer (DST): UTC-5 (CDT)
- ZIP code: 56141
- Area code: 507
- FIPS code: 27-31094
- GNIS feature ID: 2395431

Iona is a city in Murray County, Minnesota, United States. The population was 166 at the 2020 census, up from 137 in 2010.

== History ==
Iona was platted in 1878 and named after the Scottish island of Iona. A post office has been in operation at Iona since 1880.

== Geography ==
Iona is in southern Murray County and is surrounded by Iona Township. Minnesota State Highway 267 has its southern terminus in Iona and leads north 5 miles (8 km) to Highway 30, about 1 mile (1.6 km) west of Slayton, the county seat.

According to the U.S. Census Bureau, Iona has a total area of 0.55 square miles (1.42 km^{2}), all land.

Besides Highway 267, main roads in the community include Parnell Street, Grace Avenue, and Murray County Road 4, which leads to the east and west. County Road 31 is nearby.

== Demographics ==
Historical population
| Census | Pop. | Note | %± |
|---|---|---|---|
| 1900 | 358 | | — |
| 1910 | 300 | | −16.2% |
| 1920 | 365 | | 21.7% |
| 1930 | 321 | | −12.1% |
| 1940 | 365 | | 13.7% |
| 1950 | 355 | | −2.7% |
| 1960 | 328 | | −7.6% |
| 1970 | 260 | | −20.7% |
| 1980 | 248 | | −4.6% |
| 1990 | 158 | | −36.3% |
| 2000 | 173 | | 9.5% |
| 2010 | 137 | | −20.8% |
| 2020 | 166 | | 21.2% |
U.S. Decennial Census

=== 2010 census ===
As of the census of 2010, there were 137 people, 71 households, and 36 families residing in the city. The population density was 177.9 inhabitants per square mile (68.7/km^{2}). There were 88 housing units at an average density of 114.3 per square mile (44.1/km^{2}). The racial makeup of the city was 100.0% White.

There were 71 households, of which 18.3% had children under the age of 18 living with them, 45.1% were married couples living together, 2.8% had a female householder with no husband present, 2.8% had a male householder with no wife present, and 49.3% were non-families. 45.1% of all households were made up of individuals, and 26.7% had someone living alone who was 65 years of age or older. The average household size was 1.93 and the average family size was 2.72.

The median age in the city was 51.6 years. 16.8% of residents were under the age of 18; 7.4% were between the ages of 18 and 24; 11.6% were from 25 to 44; 43.7% were from 45 to 64; and 20.4% were 65 years of age or older. The gender makeup of the city was 43.1% male and 56.9% female.

=== 2000 census ===
As of the census of 2000, there were 173 people, 80 households, and 44 families residing in the city. The population density was 219.9 inhabitants per square mile (84.9/km^{2}). There were 91 housing units at an average density of 115.6 per square mile (44.6/km^{2}). The racial makeup of the city was 95.95% White, 1.16% Asian, 0.58% Pacific Islander, and 2.31% from two or more races. Hispanic or Latino of any race were 2.31% of the population.

There were 80 households, out of which 18.8% had children under the age of 18 living with them, 47.5% were married couples living together, 5.0% had a female householder with no husband present, and 45.0% were non-families. 38.8% of all households were made up of individuals, and 21.3% had someone living alone who was 65 years of age or older. The average household size was 2.16 and the average family size was 3.00.

In the city, the population was spread out, with 21.4% under the age of 18, 4.6% from 18 to 24, 24.9% from 25 to 44, 24.9% from 45 to 64, and 24.3% who were 65 years of age or older. The median age was 44 years. For every 100 females, there were 78.4 males. For every 100 females age 18 and over, there were 86.3 males.

The median income for a household in the city was $25,625, and the median income for a family was $40,833. Males had a median income of $27,500 versus $19,500 for females. The per capita income for the city was $14,746. About 8.3% of families and 8.4% of the population were below the poverty line, including 13.5% of those under the age of eighteen and 13.2% of those 65 or over.

== Politics ==
Iona is located in Minnesota's 1st congressional district. At the state level, Iona is located in Senate District 22, represented by Republican Doug Magnus, and in House District 22A, represented by Republican Joe Schomacker.
