= Trigg H. Knutson =

American politician (1879–1952)

Trigg H. Knutson (March 17, 1879 – November 17, 1952) was an American politician and businessman.

Knutson was born in Murray County, Minnesota and went to St. Olaf College in Northfield, Minnesota He lived in Slayton, Minnesota with his wife and family. Slayton operated a grocery business and was also involved in the railroad, mining, and oil businesses. Knutson served on the Slayton School Board and was the chair. He served in the Minnesota House of Representatives from 1947 until his death in 1952. Knutson died at his home in Slayton, Minnesota from a heart ailment.
