= Chanarambie Township, Murray County, Minnesota =

Chanarambie Township, Minnesota
- Township
- Location within the state of Minnesota Chanarambie Township, Minnesota (the United States)
- Coordinates: 43°58′40″N 96°0′36″W
- Country: United States
- State: Minnesota
- County: Murray

Area
  - Total: 35.5 sq mi (92.0 km^{2})
  - Land: 35.5 sq mi (92.0 km^{2})
  - Water: 0 sq mi (0.0 km^{2})
- Elevation: 1,745 ft (532 m)

Population (2000)
  - Total: 223
  - Density: 6.2/sq mi (2.4/km^{2})
- Time zone: UTC-6 (Central (CST))
  - Summer (DST): UTC-5 (CDT)
- FIPS code: 27-10882
- GNIS feature ID: 0663780

Chanarambie Township is a township in Murray County, Minnesota, United States. The population was 223 at the 2000 census.

Chanarambie Township was organized in 1879, and named after Chanarambie Creek.

== Geography ==
According to the United States Census Bureau, the township has a total area of 35.5 square miles (92 km^{2}), all land. Buffalo Ridge, the highest point in the county and the third highest in Minnesota, runs through the township. Lake Wilson lies just east of this ridge.

== Demographics ==
As of the census of 2000, there were 223 people, 76 households, and 63 families residing in the township. The population density was 6.3 inhabitants per square mile (2.4/km^{2}). There were 79 housing units at an average density of 2.2 per square mile (0.85/km^{2}). The racial makeup of the township was 97.31% White, 0.45% Asian, 0.45% from other races, and 1.79% from two or more races. Hispanic or Latino of any race were 4.04% of the population.

There were 76 households, out of which 38.2% had children under the age of 18 living with them, 75.0% were married couples living together, 5.3% had a female householder with no husband present, and 17.1% were non-families. 15.8% of all households were made up of individuals, and 3.9% had someone living alone who was 65 years of age or older. The average household size was 2.93 and the average family size was 3.29.

In the township the population was spread out, with 30.9% under the age of 18, 8.5% from 18 to 24, 26.0% from 25 to 44, 22.4% from 45 to 64, and 12.1% who were 65 years of age or older. The median age was 36 years. For every 100 females, there were 116.5 males. For every 100 females age 18 and over, there were 116.9 males.

The median income for a household in the township was $31,875, and the median income for a family was $34,464. Males had a median income of $22,115 versus $16,250 for females. The per capita income for the township was $11,696. About 7.3% of families and 11.2% of the population were below the poverty line, including 16.0% of those under the age of eighteen and 10.3% of those 65 or over.

== Politics ==
Chanarambie Township is located in Minnesota's 1st congressional district, represented by Mankato educator Tim Walz, a Democrat. At the state level, Chanarambie Township is located in Senate District 22, represented by Republican Doug Magnus, and in House District 22A, represented by Republican Joe Schomacker.
