= Des Moines River Township, Murray County, Minnesota =

Des Moines River Township, Minnesota
- Township
- Location within the state of Minnesota Des Moines River Township, Minnesota (the United States)
- Coordinates: 43°58′25″N 95°31′59″W
- Country: United States
- State: Minnesota
- County: Murray

Area
  - Total: 36.0 sq mi (93.3 km^{2})
  - Land: 35.6 sq mi (92.2 km^{2})
  - Water: 0.42 sq mi (1.1 km^{2})
- Elevation: 1,483 ft (452 m)

Population (2000)
  - Total: 182
  - Density: 5.2/sq mi (2/km^{2})
- Time zone: UTC-6 (Central (CST))
  - Summer (DST): UTC-5 (CDT)
- FIPS code: 27-15778
- GNIS feature ID: 0663971

Des Moines River Township is a township in Murray County, Minnesota, United States. The population was 182 at the 2000 census.

Des Moines River Township was organized in 1878, and named after the Des Moines River.

== Geography ==
According to the United States Census Bureau, the township has a total area of 36.0 square miles (93 km^{2}), of which 35.6 square miles (92 km^{2}) is land and 0.4 square miles (1.0 km^{2}) (1.14%) is water.

== Demographics ==
As of the census of 2000, there were 182 people, 75 households, and 60 families residing in the township. The population density was 5.1 inhabitants per square mile (2.0/km^{2}). There were 78 housing units at an average density of 2.2 per square mile (0.85/km^{2}). The racial makeup of the township was 100.00% White.

There were 75 households, out of which 24.0% had children under the age of 18 living with them, 72.0% were married couples living together, 5.3% had a female householder with no husband present, and 20.0% were non-families. 18.7% of all households were made up of individuals, and 12.0% had someone living alone who was 65 years of age or older. The average household size was 2.43 and the average family size was 2.70.

In the township the population was spread out, with 21.4% under the age of 18, 8.2% from 18 to 24, 21.4% from 25 to 44, 29.7% from 45 to 64, and 19.2% who were 65 years of age or older. The median age was 44 years. For every 100 females, there were 102.2 males. For every 100 females age 18 and over, there were 104.3 males.

The median income for a household in the township was $35,500, and the median income for a family was $36,000. Males had a median income of $20,000 versus $19,375 for females. The per capita income for the township was $15,966. About 9.1% of families and 7.3% of the population were below the poverty line, including 5.4% of those under the age of eighteen and 8.7% of those 65 or over.

== Politics ==
Des Moines River Township is located in Minnesota's 1st congressional district, represented by Mankato educator Tim Walz, a Democrat. At the state level, Des Moines River Township is located in Senate District 22, represented by Republican Doug Magnus, and in House District 22A, represented by Republican Joe Schomacker.
