= Moulton Township =

Moulton Township may refer to the following townships in the United States:

- Moulton Township, Murray County, Minnesota
- Moulton Township, Auglaize County, Ohio
- Moulton Township, Ontario
