= Skandia Township, Murray County, Minnesota =

Skandia Township, Minnesota
- Township
- Location within the state of Minnesota Skandia Township, Minnesota (the United States)
- Coordinates: 44°9′37″N 95°53′37″W
- Country: United States
- State: Minnesota
- County: Murray

Area
  - Total: 35.8 sq mi (92.7 km^{2})
  - Land: 35.2 sq mi (91.2 km^{2})
  - Water: 0.58 sq mi (1.5 km^{2})
- Elevation: 1,650 ft (503 m)

Population (2000)
  - Total: 173
  - Density: 4.9/sq mi (1.9/km^{2})
- Time zone: UTC-6 (Central (CST))
  - Summer (DST): UTC-5 (CDT)
- FIPS code: 27-60628
- GNIS feature ID: 0665625

Skandia Township is a township in Murray County, Minnesota, United States. The population was 173 at the 2000 census.

Skandia Township was organized in 1873, and named after ancient Scandia.

== Geography ==
According to the United States Census Bureau, the township has a total area of 35.8 square miles (92.7 km^{2}), of which 35.2 square miles (91.2 km^{2}) is land and 0.6 square mile (1.5 km^{2}) (1.59%) is water.

== Demographics ==
As of the census of 2000, there were 173 people, 64 households, and 51 families residing in the township. The population density was 4.9 people per square mile (1.9/km^{2}). There were 68 housing units at an average density of 1.9/sq mi (0.7/km^{2}). The racial makeup of the township was 100.00% White.

There were 64 households, out of which 32.8% had children under the age of 18 living with them, 71.9% were married couples living together, 1.6% had a female householder with no husband present, and 20.3% were non-families. 17.2% of all households were made up of individuals, and 4.7% had someone living alone who was 65 years of age or older. The average household size was 2.70 and the average family size was 3.04.

In the township the population was spread out, with 25.4% under the age of 18, 7.5% from 18 to 24, 26.6% from 25 to 44, 23.7% from 45 to 64, and 16.8% who were 65 years of age or older. The median age was 40 years. For every 100 females, there were 127.6 males. For every 100 females age 18 and over, there were 126.3 males.

The median income for a household in the township was $20,750, and the median income for a family was $22,500. Males had a median income of $21,250 versus $15,625 for females. The per capita income for the township was $51,480. About 20.0% of families and 18.9% of the population were below the poverty line, including 18.5% of those under the age of eighteen and 11.8% of those 65 or over.

== Politics ==
Skandia Township is located in Minnesota's 1st congressional district, represented by Mankato educator Tim Walz, a Democrat. At the state level, Skandia Township is located in Senate District 22, represented by Republican Doug Magnus, and in House District 22A, represented by Republican Joe Schomacker.
