= Monogram (disambiguation) =

A monogram is a motif made by overlapping or combining two or more letters or other graphemes to form one symbol.

Monogram may also refer to:

- Monogram (artwork), a combine painting by American artist Robert Rauschenberg
- Monogram (company), a United States scale model manufacturer
- Monogram Foods, a United States packaged foods manufacturer
- Monogram Pictures, a Hollywood studio
- Monogram Records, a United States record label
- Varsity letter or monogram, an award earned in the United States for excellence in school activities
- Monogram, a name used by researchers for a factory mark
- Monograms, a package tour operator, part of Globus family of brands

== See also ==
- Major Francis Monogram, a character in the animated television series Phineas and Ferb
