= Cameron Township, Murray County, Minnesota =

Cameron Township, Minnesota
- Township
- Location within the state of Minnesota Cameron Township, Minnesota (the United States)
- Coordinates: 44°4′24″N 96°0′50″W
- Country: United States
- State: Minnesota
- County: Murray

Area
  - Total: 36.0 sq mi (93.3 km^{2})
  - Land: 35.9 sq mi (92.9 km^{2})
  - Water: 0.15 sq mi (0.4 km^{2})
- Elevation: 1,716 ft (523 m)

Population (2000)
  - Total: 151
  - Density: 4.1/sq mi (1.6/km^{2})
- Time zone: UTC-6 (Central (CST))
  - Summer (DST): UTC-5 (CDT)
- FIPS code: 27-09460
- GNIS feature ID: 0663732

Cameron Township is a township in Murray County, Minnesota, United States. The population was 151 at the 2000 census.

Cameron Township was organized in 1878, and named for Charles Cameron Cole, a pioneer settler.

== Geography ==
According to the United States Census Bureau, the township has a total area of 36.0 square miles (93 km^{2}), of which 35.9 square miles (93 km^{2}) is land and 0.2 square miles (0.52 km^{2}) (0.44%) is water.

== Demographics ==
As of the census of 2000, there were 151 people, 53 households, and 41 families residing in the township. The population density was 4.2 inhabitants per square mile (1.6/km^{2}). There were 59 housing units at an average density of 1.6 per square mile (0.62/km^{2}). The racial makeup of the township was 99.34% White and 0.66% Asian.

There were 53 households, out of which 43.4% had children under the age of 18 living with them, 75.5% were married couples living together, and 22.6% were non-families. 22.6% of all households were made up of individuals, and 5.7% had someone living alone who was 65 years of age or older. The average household size was 2.85 and the average family size was 3.37.

In the township the population was spread out, with 31.1% under the age of 18, 11.9% from 18 to 24, 23.8% from 25 to 44, 25.2% from 45 to 64, and 7.9% who were 65 years of age or older. The median age was 35 years. For every 100 females, there were 98.7 males. For every 100 females age 18 and over, there were 112.2 males.

The median income for a household in the township was $25,833, and the median income for a family was $30,625. Males had a median income of $21,406 versus $27,500 for females. The per capita income for the township was $12,991. There were 14.3% of families and 17.0% of the population living below the poverty line, including 16.3% of under eighteens and none of those over 64.

== Politics ==
Cameron Township is located in Minnesota's 1st congressional district, represented by Mankato educator Tim Walz, a Democrat. At the state level, Cameron Township is located in Senate District 22, represented by Republican Doug Magnus, and in House District 22A, represented by Republican Joe Schomacker.
