= Minnesota State Highway 30 =

State highway in Minnesota, United States

Trunk Highway 30
- MN 30 highlighted in red

Route information
- Maintained by MnDOT
- Length: 265.503 mi (427.286 km)
- Existed: 1933–present

Major junctions
- West end: SD 34 at the South Dakota state line near Airlie
- US 75 / MN 23 at Pipestone; US 59 at Slayton; US 169 at Amboy; I-35 at Ellendale; US 218 at Blooming Prairie; US 63 from Rochester to Stewartville; I-90 near Rochester; US 52 at Chatfield
- East end: MN 43 at Rushford

Location
- Country: United States
- State: Minnesota
- Counties: Pipestone, Murray, Cottonwood, Watonwan, Blue Earth, Waseca, Steele, Dodge, Olmsted, Fillmore

Highway system
- Minnesota Trunk Highway System; Interstate; US; State; Legislative; Scenic
← MN 29	→ MN 32

Minnesota State Highway 30 (MN 30) is a 265.503-mile-long (427.286 km) highway in southwest and southeast Minnesota, which runs from South Dakota Highway 34 at the South Dakota state line near Airlie, west of Pipestone, and continues to its eastern terminus at its intersection with Minnesota Highway 43 in Rushford.

== Route description ==
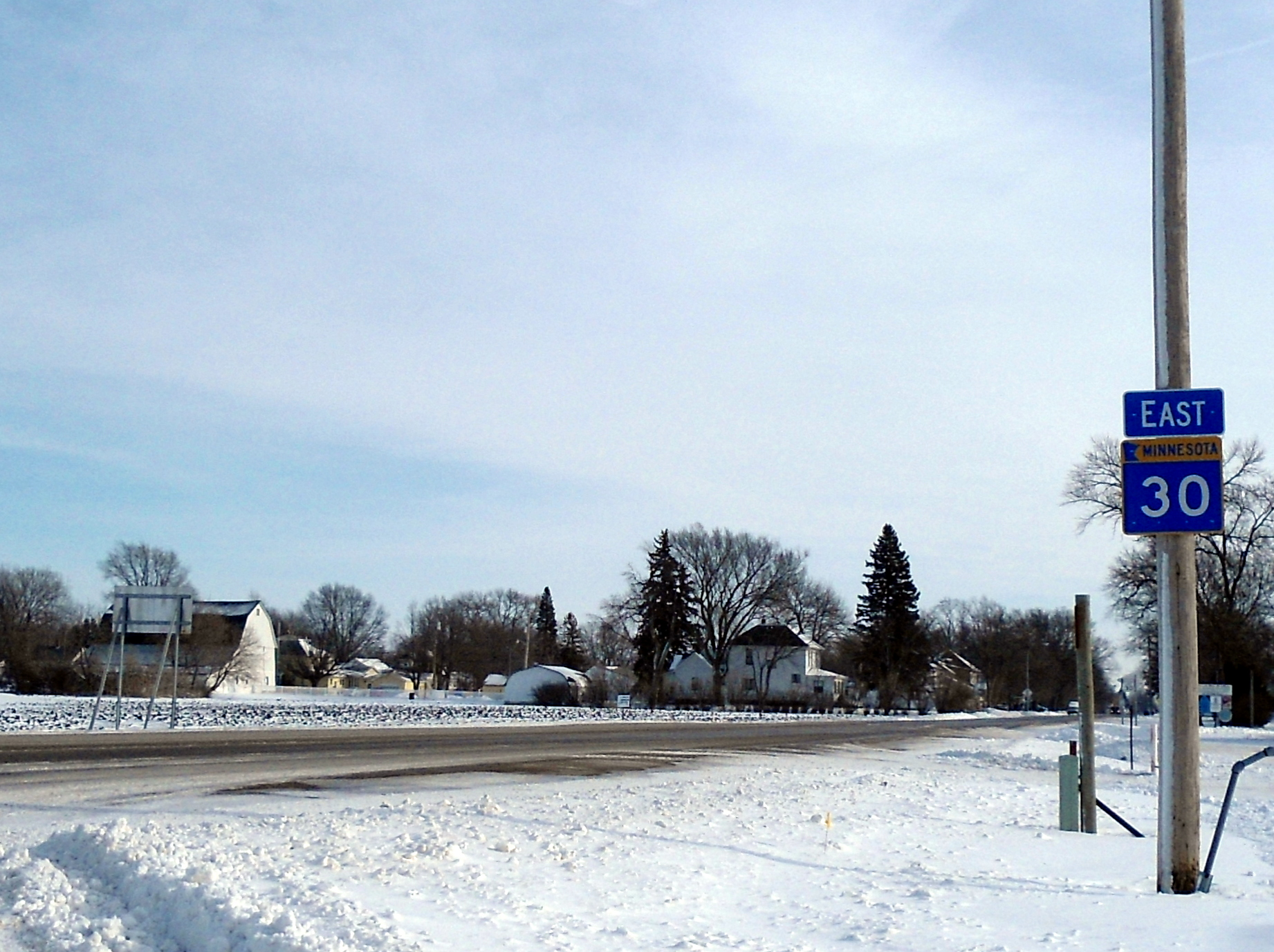
MN 30 in Amboy

State Highway 30 serves as an east–west route between Pipestone, Slayton, St. James, Stewartville, Chatfield, and Rushford.

Highway 30 parallels U.S. Highway 14 and Interstate Highway 90 throughout its route.

The Pipestone National Monument is located immediately north of Highway 30 in Pipestone.

Lake Shetek State Park is located near Highway 30 in Murray County on the shore of Lake Shetek. The park is located immediately north of the town of Currie and northeast of Slayton.

Highway 30 passes through the Richard J. Dorer Memorial Hardwood State Forest in Olmsted and Fillmore counties.

== History ==
State Highway 30 was established in 1933, originally running from Highway 15 to Rushford. It replaced former State Highway 41 from Blooming Prairie to Hayfield. The road was completely gravel at this time except where it overlapped other highways.

By 1946, the road was still unpaved except for short sections in and near some towns. The first extended paving was done from Cummingsville to Rushford in 1948 and 1949. The remainder of the highway was paved throughout the 1950s; by 1960 it was fully paved. In 1955, the highway was re-routed east of Chatfield to overlap with Highway 74.

Trunk Highway 47
- Location: Southern Minnesota
- Length: 98 mi (158 km)
- Existed: 1920–1961

In 1961, Highway 30 was extended westward, along the route of what had previously been State Highway 47. (This highway number was simultaneously re-used on another highway in east-central Minnesota.) This extension was paved except for the section between U.S. 71 and the Cottonwood-Watonwan county line; this section was paved in 1965.

Highway 47 was originally established November 2, 1920 from Pipestone to Slayton. It was extended west to the South Dakota state line and east to Highway 4 north of St. James in 1933. The entire highway was gravel at this time. In 1939, it was realigned to take a direct route to Darfur from U.S. 71, bypassing Comfrey. By 1940, the roadway was paved from the state line to Westbrook. Paving from Westbrook to U.S. 71 was performed in 1950 and 1951, and through Watonwan County in 1955.

In the late 1970s, Highway 30's overlap with Highway 60 was upgraded to a four-lane expressway.

== Future ==
There are plans to reroute the highway into the City of Rochester to better serve the Rochester International Airport and improve conditions on U.S. 63.

== Major intersections ==
County	Location	mi	km	Destinations	Notes
Pipestone	Sweet Township	0.000	0.000	SD 34 west – Madison	Western terminus; continuation into South Dakota
Pipestone	Pipestone	7.718	12.421	MN 23 west – Jasper, I-90	Western end of MN 23 concurrency
Pipestone	Pipestone	7.937	12.773	US 75 north / MN 23 east – Lake Benton, Marshall	Western end of US 75 concurrency; eastern end of MN 23 concurrency
Pipestone	Pipestone	8.285	13.333	US 75 south – Luverne	Eastern end of US 75 concurrency
Murray	Lake Wilson	25.678	41.325	MN 91 north	Western end of MN 91 concurrency
Murray	Lake Wilson	25.983	41.816	MN 91 south – Chandler	Eastern end of MN 91 concurrency
Murray	Slayton Township	34.075	54.838	MN 267 south – Iona	Northern terminus of MN 267
Murray	Slayton	35.709	57.468	US 59 south / CSAH 8 – Worthington	Southern end of US 59 concurrency
Murray	Mason Township	41.434	66.682	US 59 north – Marshall	Northern end of US 59 concurrency
Cottonwood	Amboy Township	73.689	118.591	US 71 – Windom, Redwood Falls	
Watonwan	Nelson Township	97.652	157.156	MN 4 north / CSAH 30 – Sleepy Eye, La Salle	Northern end of MN 4 concurrency
Watonwan	St. James			Bus. MN 60 west / CSAH 56	Western end of MN 60 Bus. concurrency
Watonwan	St. James Township	104.231	167.744	MN 4 south / MN 60 west / CSAH 27 – Sherburn, Windom	Southern end of MN 4 concurrency, western end of MN 60 concurrency; eastern end of MN 60 Bus.
Watonwan	Rosendale Township			CSAH 12 – St. James	Interchange
Watonwan	Fieldon Township	113.915	183.328	MN 60 east / MN 15 north – Madelia	Eastern end of MN 60 concurrency; northern end of MN 15 concurrency
Watonwan	Antrim Township	118.961	191.449	MN 15 south – Fairmont	Southern end of MN 15 concurrency
Blue Earth	Shelby Township	131.847	212.187	US 169 north – Mankato	Northern end of US 169 concurrency
Blue Earth	Shelby Township	132.203	212.760	US 169 south – Blue Earth	Southern end of US 169 concurrency
Blue Earth	Mapleton	144.310	232.244	MN 22 north / CSAH 21 – Mankato	Northern end of MN 22 concurrency
Blue Earth	Mapleton Township	146.882	236.384	MN 22 south / CSAH 29 – Wells	Southern end of MN 22 concurrency
Waseca	Vivian Township	157.936	254.173	MN 83 north / CSAH 28 to CSAH 3 – Waldorf	Southern terminus of MN 83
Waseca	New Richland Township	168.464	271.117	MN 13 – Albert Lea, Waseca	
Steele	Summit Township	179.566– 179.718	288.983– 289.228	I-35 – Albert Lea, Minneapolis, St. Paul	I-35 Exit 26; interchange
Steele	Blooming Prairie	190.903	307.229	US 218 north / CSAH 16 – Owatonna	Northern end of US 218 concurrency
Steele	Blooming Prairie	191.462	308.128	US 218 south – Austin	Southern end of US 218 concurrency
Dodge	Hayfield	202.561	325.990	MN 56 – I-90, Dodge Center	
Olmsted	Rochester	221.368	356.257	US 63 north / CSAH 16 – Rochester	Northern end of US 63 concurrency
Olmsted	High Forest Township			I-90 – Austin, La Crosse	I-90 Exits 209A-B; interchange
Olmsted	Stewartville	223.892	360.319	US 63 south	Southern end of US 63 concurrency
Olmsted	Chatfield	239.804	385.927	US 52 north – Rochester	Northern end of US 52 concurrency
Fillmore	Chatfield	240.303	386.730	US 52 south / CSAH 2 / MN 74 begins – Preston	Southern end of US 52 concurrency; western end of MN 74 currency; southern terminus of MN 74
Olmsted	Elmira Township	244.419	393.354	MN 74 north – St. Charles	Eastern end of MN 74 concurrency
Fillmore	Arendahl Township	254.517	409.605	MN 250 south / CSAH 32 – Lanesboro	Northern terminus of MN 250
Fillmore	Rushford	265.503	427.286	MN 43	Eastern terminus
1.000 mi = 1.609 km; 1.000 km = 0.621 mi: Concurrency terminus
