= Holly Township, Murray County, Minnesota =

Holly Township, Minnesota
- Township
- Location within the state of Minnesota Holly Township, Minnesota (the United States)
- Coordinates: 44°9′44″N 95°31′21″W
- Country: United States
- State: Minnesota
- County: Murray

Area
  - Total: 35.8 sq mi (92.7 km^{2})
  - Land: 35.8 sq mi (92.7 km^{2})
  - Water: 0 sq mi (0.0 km^{2})
- Elevation: 1,410 ft (430 m)

Population (2000)
  - Total: 172
  - Density: 4.9/sq mi (1.9/km^{2})
- Time zone: UTC-6 (Central (CST))
  - Summer (DST): UTC-5 (CDT)
- FIPS code: 27-29690
- GNIS feature ID: 0664501

Holly Township is a township in Murray County, Minnesota, United States. The population was 172 at the 2000 census.

Holly Township was organized in 1872, and named for John Z. Holly, an early settler.

== Geography ==
According to the United States Census Bureau, the township has a total area of 35.8 square miles (93 km^{2}), all land. Plum Creek rises in Holly.

== Demographics ==
As of the census of 2000, there were 172 people, 59 households, and 49 families residing in the township. The population density was 4.8 inhabitants per square mile (1.9/km^{2}). There were 62 housing units at an average density of 1.7 per square mile (0.66/km^{2}). The racial makeup of the township was 96.51% White, 0.58% Pacific Islander, 2.91% from other races. Hispanic or Latino of any race were 2.91% of the population.

There were 59 households, out of which 33.9% had children under the age of 18 living with them, 69.5% were married couples living together, 6.8% had a female householder with no husband present, and 16.9% were non-families. 15.3% of all households were made up of individuals, and 11.9% had someone living alone who was 65 years of age or older. The average household size was 2.92 and the average family size was 3.20.

In the township the population was spread out, with 30.8% under the age of 18, 4.1% from 18 to 24, 26.7% from 25 to 44, 20.9% from 45 to 64, and 17.4% who were 65 years of age or older. The median age was 38 years. For every 100 females, there were 109.8 males. For every 100 females age 18 and over, there were 128.8 males.

The median income for a household in the township was $37,500, and the median income for a family was $36,458. Males had a median income of $26,875 versus $13,750 for females. The per capita income for the township was $14,055. About 7.5% of families and 10.3% of the population were below the poverty line, including 7.9% of those under the age of eighteen and 12.9% of those 65 or over.

== Politics ==
Holly Township is located in Minnesota's 1st congressional district, represented by Mankato educator Tim Walz, a Democrat. At the state level, Holly Township is located in Senate District 22, represented by Republican Doug Magnus, and in House District 22A, represented by Republican Joe Schomacker.
