= Iona Township =

Iona Township may refer to:

- Iona Township, Murray County, Minnesota
- Iona Township, Todd County, Minnesota
- Iona Township, Lyman County, South Dakota, in Lyman County, South Dakota
