= Corabelle Lake =

Lake in the state of Minnesota, United States

- Location within Minnesota Location within the United States
- Location: Murray County, Minnesota
- Coordinates: 43°52′37″N 95°48′4″W
- Type: lake
- Basin countries: United States
- Surface area: 107 acres (43 ha)
- Max. depth: 6 ft (1.8 m)
- Surface elevation: 1,660 ft (506 m)

Corabelle Lake is a lake in Murray County, in the U.S. state of Minnesota.

Corabelle Lake was named for the daughter of a local hotel owner.
