= Fenton Township, Murray County, Minnesota =

Fenton Township, Minnesota
- Township
- Location within the state of Minnesota Fenton Township, Minnesota (the United States)
- Coordinates: 43°53′48″N 95°53′34″W
- Country: United States
- State: Minnesota
- County: Murray

Area
  - Total: 35.8 sq mi (92.8 km^{2})
  - Land: 35.8 sq mi (92.6 km^{2})
  - Water: 0.077 sq mi (0.2 km^{2})
- Elevation: 1,680 ft (512 m)

Population (2000)
  - Total: 209
  - Density: 6.0/sq mi (2.3/km^{2})
- Time zone: UTC-6 (Central (CST))
  - Summer (DST): UTC-5 (CDT)
- FIPS code: 27-20888
- GNIS feature ID: 0664158

Fenton Township is a township in Murray County, Minnesota, United States. The population was 209 at the 2000 census.

Fenton Township, was organized in 1886, and named for P. H. Fenton, an early settler.

== Geography ==
According to the United States Census Bureau, the township has a total area of 35.8 square miles (93 km^{2}), of which 35.8 square miles (93 km^{2}) is land and 0.1 square miles (0.26 km^{2}) (0.17%) is water.

== Demographics ==
As of the census of 2000, there were 209 people, 72 households, and 61 families residing in the township. The population density was 5.8 inhabitants per square mile (2.2/km^{2}). There were 76 housing units at an average density of 2.1 per square mile (0.81/km^{2}). The racial makeup of the township was 98.56% White, 0.96% Native American, 0.48% from other races. Hispanic or Latino of any race were 0.48% of the population.

There were 72 households, out of which 41.7% had children under the age of 18 living with them, 80.6% were married couples living together, 1.4% had a female householder with no husband present, and 13.9% were non-families. 12.5% of all households were made up of individuals, and 4.2% had someone living alone who was 65 years of age or older. The average household size was 2.90 and the average family size was 3.19.

In the township the population was spread out, with 31.1% under the age of 18, 4.3% from 18 to 24, 20.1% from 25 to 44, 32.5% from 45 to 64, and 12.0% who were 65 years of age or older. The median age was 40 years. For every 100 females, there were 137.5 males. For every 100 females age 18 and over, there were 128.6 males.

The median income for a household in the township was $39,167, and the median income for a family was $43,333. Males had a median income of $26,250 versus $20,313 for females. The per capita income for the township was $16,951. About 3.2% of families and 1.9% of the population were below the poverty line, including none of those under the age of eighteen or sixty five or over.

== Politics ==
Fenton Township is located in Minnesota's 1st congressional district, represented by Mankato educator Tim Walz, a Democrat. At the state level, Fenton Township is located in Senate District 22, represented by Republican Doug Magnus, and in House District 22A, represented by Republican Joe Schomacker.
