= Bondin Township, Murray County, Minnesota =

Bondin Township, Minnesota
- Township
- Location within the state of Minnesota Bondin Township, Minnesota (the United States)
- Coordinates: 43°52′55″N 95°37′59″W
- Country: United States
- State: Minnesota
- County: Murray

Area
  - Total: 35.3 sq mi (91.3 km^{2})
  - Land: 35.1 sq mi (90.8 km^{2})
  - Water: 0.19 sq mi (0.5 km^{2})
- Elevation: 1,540 ft (470 m)

Population (2000)
  - Total: 335
  - Density: 9.6/sq mi (3.7/km^{2})
- Time zone: UTC-6 (Central (CST))
  - Summer (DST): UTC-5 (CDT)
- FIPS code: 27-06922
- GNIS feature ID: 0663632

Bondin Township is a township in Murray County, Minnesota, United States. The population was 335 at the 2000 census.

Bondin Township was organized in 1874.

== Geography ==
According to the United States Census Bureau, the township has a total area of 35.3 square miles (91 km^{2}), of which 35.0 square miles (91 km^{2}) is land and 0.2 square miles (0.52 km^{2}) (0.60%) is water.

== Demographics ==
As of the census of 2000, there were 335 people, 119 households, and 94 families residing in the township. The population density was 9.6 inhabitants per square mile (3.7/km^{2}). There were 127 housing units at an average density of 3.6 per square mile (1.4/km^{2}). The racial makeup of the township was 99.40% White, and 0.60% from two or more races.

There were 119 households, out of which 39.5% had children under the age of 18 living with them, 76.5% were married couples living together, 3.4% had a female householder with no husband present, and 20.2% were non-families. 15.1% of all households were made up of individuals, and 5.9% had someone living alone who was 65 years of age or older. The average household size was 2.82 and the average family size was 3.20.

In the township the population was spread out, with 32.2% under the age of 18, 4.5% from 18 to 24, 24.8% from 25 to 44, 23.0% from 45 to 64, and 15.5% who were 65 years of age or older. The median age was 39 years. For every 100 females, there were 104.3 males. For every 100 females age 18 and over, there were 104.5 males.

The median income for a household in the township was $46,000, and the median income for a family was $49,167. Males had a median income of $26,389 versus $18,646 for females. The per capita income for the township was $16,398. About 6.4% of families and 5.0% of the population were below the poverty line, including 4.0% of those under age 18 and none of those age 65 or over.

== Politics ==
Bondin Township is located in Minnesota's 1st congressional district, represented by Mankato educator Tim Walz, a Democrat. At the state level, Bondin Township is located in Senate District 22, represented by Republican Doug Magnus, and in House District 22A, represented by Republican Joe Schomacker.
