= Lake Wilson, Minnesota =

City in Minnesota, United States

- City
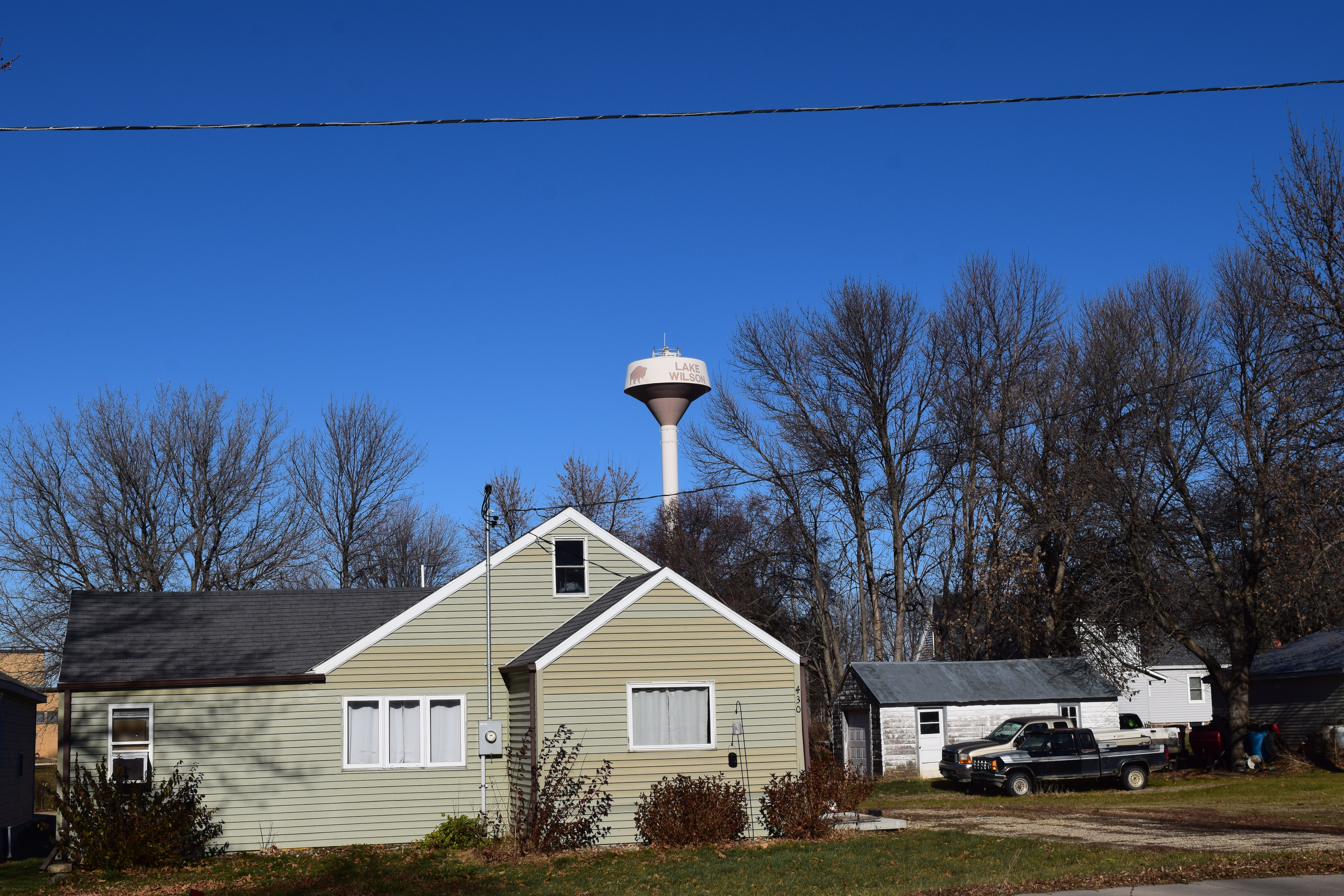
- Lake Wilson water tower

- Location in Murray County and the state of Minnesota
- Coordinates: 43°59′47″N 95°57′13″W
- Country: United States
- State: Minnesota
- County: Murray

Government
  - Type: Mayor - Council
  - Mayor: Michael Chapman

Area
  - Total: 0.51 sq mi (1.31 km^{2})
  - Land: 0.42 sq mi (1.10 km^{2})
  - Water: 0.085 sq mi (0.22 km^{2})
- Elevation: 1,663 ft (507 m)

Population (2020)
  - Total: 254
  - Density: 600.4/sq mi (231.82/km^{2})
- Time zone: UTC-6 (Central (CST))
  - Summer (DST): UTC-5 (CDT)
- ZIP code: 56151
- Area code: 507
- FIPS code: 27-35198
- GNIS feature ID: 2395606
- Website: lakewilsonmn.com

Lake Wilson is a city in Murray County, Minnesota, United States. The population was 254 at the 2020 census.

== History ==
Lake Wilson was platted in 1883 and incorporated as a village on July 12, 1900. It was named by J. E. Wilson (a landowner in the area) who also named the nearby lake for himself.

On June 16, 1992, Lake Wilson was struck by a devastating F5 tornado that completely destroyed half of the town, which has since been rebuilt.

On January 12, 2004, the city's firehall exploded, destroying it and the nearby elevator. It also damaged many nearby houses and businesses. The blast was audible at 25 miles (40 km), and could be felt as far as 30 miles (48 km) away. The city estimated that recovery costs resulting from the explosion totaled about $4.2 million. Since then both the firehall and elevator have been rebuilt.

== Geography ==
Lake Wilson is in western Murray County. It is bordered to the north, west, and south by Chanarambie Township and to the east by Leeds Township. Minnesota State Highways 30 and 91 are two of the main routes in the community. MN 30 runs through the southern part of the city, leading east 10 miles (16 km) to Slayton, the county seat, and west 18 miles (29 km) to Pipestone. MN 91 passes through the center of the city, leading north 23 miles (37 km) to Russell and south 25 miles (40 km) to Adrian.

According to the U.S. Census Bureau, the city of Lake Wilson has a total area of 0.50 square miles (1.29 km^{2}), of which 0.41 square miles (1.06 km^{2}) are land and 0.08 square miles (0.21 km^{2}), or 16.77%, are water. The community's namesake, Lake Wilson, occupies the eastern part of the city limits.

=== Climate ===
Climate data for Lake Wilson, Minnesota (1991−2020 normals, extremes 1973−present)
Month	Jan	Feb	Mar	Apr	May	Jun	Jul	Aug	Sep	Oct	Nov	Dec	Year
Record high °F (°C)	64 (18)	70 (21)	83 (28)	91 (33)	96 (36)	105 (41)	104 (40)	100 (38)	101 (38)	92 (33)	79 (26)	64 (18)	105 (41)
Mean maximum °F (°C)	42.6 (5.9)	48.4 (9.1)	65.2 (18.4)	79.1 (26.2)	87.5 (30.8)	92.6 (33.7)	91.8 (33.2)	90.7 (32.6)	87.7 (30.9)	81.6 (27.6)	64.4 (18.0)	46.3 (7.9)	95.0 (35.0)
Mean daily maximum °F (°C)	21.3 (−5.9)	26.1 (−3.3)	38.4 (3.6)	53.6 (12.0)	66.5 (19.2)	77.3 (25.2)	81.1 (27.3)	78.5 (25.8)	71.5 (21.9)	57.3 (14.1)	40.4 (4.7)	26.4 (−3.1)	53.2 (11.8)
Daily mean °F (°C)	12.6 (−10.8)	17.1 (−8.3)	29.2 (−1.6)	42.8 (6.0)	55.7 (13.2)	66.5 (19.2)	70.5 (21.4)	67.8 (19.9)	59.9 (15.5)	46.1 (7.8)	31.1 (−0.5)	18.3 (−7.6)	43.1 (6.2)
Mean daily minimum °F (°C)	3.9 (−15.6)	8.1 (−13.3)	20.0 (−6.7)	31.9 (−0.1)	44.9 (7.2)	55.6 (13.1)	59.8 (15.4)	57.0 (13.9)	48.2 (9.0)	34.9 (1.6)	21.8 (−5.7)	10.2 (−12.1)	33.0 (0.6)
Mean minimum °F (°C)	−17.9 (−27.7)	−11.8 (−24.3)	−3.0 (−19.4)	17.1 (−8.3)	30.6 (−0.8)	43.3 (6.3)	48.3 (9.1)	44.9 (7.2)	32.5 (0.3)	18.8 (−7.3)	3.6 (−15.8)	−11.5 (−24.2)	−20.3 (−29.1)
Record low °F (°C)	−33 (−36)	−26 (−32)	−20 (−29)	5 (−15)	22 (−6)	36 (2)	43 (6)	34 (1)	23 (−5)	8 (−13)	−16 (−27)	−28 (−33)	−33 (−36)
Average precipitation inches (mm)	0.61 (15)	0.91 (23)	1.62 (41)	2.95 (75)	4.02 (102)	4.97 (126)	3.62 (92)	3.40 (86)	3.24 (82)	2.26 (57)	1.70 (43)	0.84 (21)	30.14 (766)
Average snowfall inches (cm)	7.8 (20)	10.0 (25)	9.2 (23)	5.1 (13)	0.3 (0.76)	0.0 (0.0)	0.0 (0.0)	0.0 (0.0)	0.0 (0.0)	0.8 (2.0)	4.0 (10)	9.1 (23)	46.3 (118)
Average precipitation days (≥ 0.01 in)	3.7	4.8	5.3	7.1	9.3	9.6	6.9	6.6	6.3	5.7	3.9	4.3	73.5
Average snowy days (≥ 0.1 in)	3.4	4.1	2.5	0.9	0.1	0.0	0.0	0.0	0.0	0.4	1.7	3.6	16.7
Source: NOAA

== Demographics ==
Historical population
Census	Pop.	Note	%±
1910	219		—
1920	354		61.6%
1930	329		−7.1%
1940	421		28.0%
1950	434		3.1%
1960	436		0.5%
1970	378		−13.3%
1980	380		0.5%
1990	319		−16.1%
2000	270		−15.4%
2010	251		−7.0%
2020	254		1.2%
U.S. Decennial Census

=== 2010 census ===
As of the census of 2010, there were 251 people, 128 households, and 72 families living in the city. The population density was 597.6 inhabitants per square mile (230.7/km^{2}). There were 139 housing units at an average density of 331.0 per square mile (127.8/km^{2}). The racial makeup of the city was 99.6% White and 0.4% Asian. Hispanic or Latino of any race were 2.0% of the population.

There were 128 households, of which 15.6% had children under the age of 18 living with them, 52.3% were married couples living together, 3.1% had a female householder with no husband present, 0.8% had a male householder with no wife present, and 43.8% were non-families. 40.6% of all households were made up of individuals, and 15.6% had someone living alone who was 65 years of age or older. The average household size was 1.96 and the average family size was 2.61.

The median age in the city was 51.2 years. 16.7% of residents were under the age of 18; 4.9% were between the ages of 18 and 24; 19.2% were from 25 to 44; 35.2% were from 45 to 64; and 24.3% were 65 years of age or older. The gender makeup of the city was 52.6% male and 47.4% female.

=== 2000 census ===
As of the census of 2000, there were 270 people, 128 households, and 83 families living in the city. The population density was 650.1 inhabitants per square mile (251.0/km^{2}). There were 135 housing units at an average density of 325.0 per square mile (125.5/km^{2}). The racial makeup of the city was 98.89% White, 0.37% from other races, and 0.74% from two or more races. Hispanic or Latino of any race were 4.07% of the population.

There were 128 households, out of which 26.6% had children under the age of 18 living with them, 53.1% were married couples living together, 7.8% had a female householder with no husband present, and 34.4% were non-families. 32.8% of all households were made up of individuals, and 19.5% had someone living alone who was 65 years of age or older. The average household size was 2.11 and the average family size was 2.60.

In the city, the population was spread out, with 20.7% under the age of 18, 6.3% from 18 to 24, 24.8% from 25 to 44, 23.3% from 45 to 64, and 24.8% who were 65 years of age or older. The median age was 44 years. For every 100 females, there were 101.5 males. For every 100 females age 18 and over, there were 94.5 males.

The median income for a household in the city was $28,375, and the median income for a family was $30,000. Males had a median income of $32,813 versus $18,594 for females. The per capita income for the city was $16,573. About 13.3% of families and 16.3% of the population were below the poverty line, including 24.6% of those under the age of eighteen and 12.3% of those 65 or over.

== Politics ==
Lake Wilson is located in Minnesota's 7th congressional district, represented by Michelle Fischbach, a Republican. At the state level, Lake Wilson is located in Senate District 21 represented by Bill Weber, and in House District 21A represented by Joe Schomacker; both of whom are Republicans.
