= Mason Township, Murray County, Minnesota =

Mason Township, Minnesota
- Township
- Location within the state of Minnesota Mason Township, Minnesota (the United States)
- Coordinates: 44°4′20″N 95°45′2″W
- Country: United States
- State: Minnesota
- County: Murray

Area
  - Total: 35.9 sq mi (93.1 km^{2})
  - Land: 34.6 sq mi (89.7 km^{2})
  - Water: 1.3 sq mi (3.3 km^{2})
- Elevation: 1,610 ft (490 m)

Population (2000)
  - Total: 284
  - Density: 8.3/sq mi (3.2/km^{2})
- Time zone: UTC-6 (Central (CST))
  - Summer (DST): UTC-5 (CDT)
- FIPS code: 27-40958
- GNIS feature ID: 0664928

Mason Township is a township in Murray County, Minnesota, United States. The population was 284 at the 2000 census. It contains part of the census-designated place of The Lakes.

Mason Township was originally called Okcheeda Township, and under the latter name was organized in 1872. The present name, adopted in 1879, is for Milo D. Mason, an early settler.

== Geography ==
According to the United States Census Bureau, the township has a total area of 35.9 square miles (93.1 km^{2}), of which 34.7 square miles (89.7 km^{2}) is land and 1.3 square miles (3.3 km^{2}) (3.59%) is water.

== Demographics ==
As of the census of 2000, there were 284 people, 115 households, and 96 families residing in the township. The population density was 8.2 inhabitants per square mile (3.2/km^{2}). There were 194 housing units at an average density of 5.6 per square mile (2.2/km^{2}). The racial makeup of the township was 99.30% White, and 0.70% from two or more races.

There were 115 households, out of which 27.8% had children under the age of 18 living with them, 77.4% were married couples living together, 2.6% had a female householder with no husband present, and 16.5% were non-families. 14.8% of all households were made up of individuals, and 5.2% had someone living alone who was 65 years of age or older. The average household size was 2.47 and the average family size was 2.72.

In the township the population was spread out, with 23.6% under the age of 18, 3.9% from 18 to 24, 21.1% from 25 to 44, 31.7% from 45 to 64, and 19.7% who were 65 years of age or older. The median age was 46 years. For every 100 females, there were 95.9 males. For every 100 females age 18 and over, there were 102.8 males.

The median income for a household in the township was $40,250, and the median income for a family was $42,000. Males had a median income of $28,750 versus $21,250 for females. The per capita income for the township was $19,186. About 7.0% of families and 7.6% of the population were below the poverty line, including 6.2% of those under the age of eighteen and none of those 65 or over.

== Politics ==
Mason Township is located in Minnesota's 1st congressional district, represented by Mankato educator Tim Walz, a Democrat. At the state level, Mason Township is located in Senate District 22, represented by Republican Doug Magnus, and in House District 22A, represented by Republican Joe Schomacker.
