= Slayton Township, Murray County, Minnesota =

Slayton Township, Minnesota
- Township
- Location within the state of Minnesota Slayton Township, Minnesota (the United States)
- Coordinates: 43°58′50″N 95°44′32″W
- Country: United States
- State: Minnesota
- County: Murray

Area
  - Total: 34.3 sq mi (88.8 km^{2})
  - Land: 34.0 sq mi (88.1 km^{2})
  - Water: 0.27 sq mi (0.7 km^{2})
- Elevation: 1,601 ft (488 m)

Population (2000)
  - Total: 343
  - Density: 10/sq mi (3.9/km^{2})
- Time zone: UTC-6 (Central (CST))
  - Summer (DST): UTC-5 (CDT)
- ZIP code: 56172
- Area code: 507
- FIPS code: 27-60826
- GNIS feature ID: 0665632

Slayton Township is a township in Murray County, Minnesota, United States. The population was 343 at the 2000 census.

Slayton Township was originally called Center Township, and under the latter name was organized in 1872. The present name was adopted in 1882, for Clayton W. Slayton, an early settler.

== Geography ==
According to the United States Census Bureau, the township has a total area of 34.3 square miles (88.8 km^{2}), of which 34.0 square miles (88.1 km^{2}) is land and 0.3 square mile (0.7 km^{2}) (0.79%) is water.

== Demographics ==
As of the census of 2000, there were 343 people, 127 households, and 107 families residing in the township. The population density was 10.1 people per square mile (3.9/km^{2}). There were 129 housing units at an average density of 3.8/sq mi (1.5/km^{2}). The racial makeup of the township was 99.42% White, 0.29% African American and 0.29% Native American. Hispanic or Latino of any race were 0.29% of the population.

There were 127 households, out of which 35.4% had children under the age of 18 living with them, 79.5% were married couples living together, 3.1% had a female householder with no husband present, and 15.7% were non-families. 14.2% of all households were made up of individuals, and 3.9% had someone living alone who was 65 years of age or older. The average household size was 2.70 and the average family size was 2.95.

In the township the population was spread out, with 26.2% under the age of 18, 6.1% from 18 to 24, 21.6% from 25 to 44, 31.8% from 45 to 64, and 14.3% who were 65 years of age or older. The median age was 42 years. For every 100 females, there were 107.9 males. For every 100 females age 18 and over, there were 112.6 males.

The median income for a household in the township was $48,333, and the median income for a family was $51,429. Males had a median income of $30,114 versus $19,688 for females. The per capita income for the township was $21,026. About 4.7% of families and 4.5% of the population were below the poverty line, including 5.0% of those under age 18 and 7.8% of those age 65 or over.

== Politics ==
Slayton Township is located in Minnesota's 1st congressional district, represented by Mankato educator Tim Walz, a Democrat. At the state level, Slayton Township is located in Senate District 22, represented by Republican Doug Magnus, and in House District 22A, represented by Republican Joe Schomacker.
