= Monogram Foods =

American food company

Monogram Foods Solutions, LLC
- Company type: Private
- Industry: Food processing
- Founded: 2004; 22 years ago in Memphis, Tennessee, United States
- Headquarters: Memphis, Tennessee, United States
- Key people: Karl Schledwitz (chairman and CEO); Wes Jackson (president and co-founder)
- Products: Packaged foods
- Number of employees: 4000 (2023)
- Website: monogramfoods.com

Monogram Foods is a privately held, Memphis, Tennessee-based, manufacturer and marketer of packaged and value-added foods. The company, which distributes its products nationwide, operates manufacturing and distribution facilities in Indiana, Iowa, Massachusetts, Minnesota, Virginia, and Wisconsin. Monogram Foods manufactures a number of items, including bacon, beef jerky, corn dogs, frozen appetizers, assembled sandwiches, and baked goods.

== History ==
Monogram Food Solutions, LLC was founded in 2004 and formed through the acquisition of the King Cotton (now King's Rightly Seasoned) and Circle B meat brands, previously owned by Sara Lee Corporation.

Inc. Magazine named Monogram Foods as one of the 5000 fastest-growing privately held companies consecutively from 2009 to 2019. In June 2017, Monogram Foods was named The National Provisioner's Processor of the Year for 2017 in part due to Monogram's significant growth through acquisitions and capital investments. It also won the National Clean Energy Award and its Martinsville, Virginia biogas system was named Project of the Year by the American Biogas Council. The company has 3,600 employees across 12 manufacturing plants as of 2025.

In 2012, the company created the Monogram Foods Loves Kids Foundation which raises funds for children's charities in the communities in which Monogram Foods operates. To date Monogram Foods Loves Kids has raised more than $16 million for child-focused charitable organizations. The funds are raised and donated by employees, shareholders, team members, friends, and suppliers of the company.

=== Acquisitions ===
Monogram Foods considers the number of acquisitions it has made to be one of the key aspects of its growth. In 2006, Monogram Foods acquired its first production plant in Chandler, Minnesota to produce meat jerky snacks. In 2009, Monogram Foods purchased American's Food Group meat snack business in Martinsville, Virginia. In 2012, Hinsdale Farms of Bristol, Indiana, one of the largest manufacturers of corn dogs, sold its manufacturing facility to Monogram Foods. Westin Foods sold its Shelby County Cookers business and bacon manufacturing operation in Harlan, Iowa, to Monogram Foods in 2013. The facility was changed to Monogram Prepared Meals, LLC, and kept the 187 employees that were employed at the facility.

In July 2015, Monogram acquired Golden County Foods of Plover, Wisconsin, a frozen foods business with two production facilities, and reported annual sales of $100 million. In April 2016, Monogram Foods acquired Progressive Gourmet, a baked goods and hors d'oeuvres business in Wilmington, Massachusetts. The acquisition was targeted by the company for the purpose of merging it with Monogram's other frozen appetizer plant in Plover, Wisconsin. By purchasing this plant and renaming it Monogram Appetizers, Monogram expanded its frozen foods division into a three-plant, 800-employee unit.

In June 2021, Monogram Foods acquired Quality Foods Processors, a pork belly processor in Denison, Iowa, in June 2021. In November 2021, Monogram Foods acquired a facility in Dickson, Tennessee, marking its first Tennessee-based location and 13th facility nationwide.

== Facilities ==
The first production plant Monogram Foods acquired is located in Chandler, Minnesota. The plant's legal name is Monogram Meat Snacks as it produces primarily meat jerky and sticks. It has seen significant capital investments since it was purchased in 2006, including four new production lines and an improved wastewater system. It has grown from 115 employees in 2006 to 400 in 2023.

The company's facility in Martinsville, Virginia, has expanded four times since its purchase by Monogram Foods in 2009, increasing employment from 115 employees in 2009 to 600 in 2017. In 2015, improvements to warehousing and logistics capabilities were carried out in partnership with multiple local organizations, including The Virginia Economic Development Partnership, Martinsville-Henry County Economic Development Corporation, The Governor's Opportunity Fund, and The Virginia Tobacco Indemnification and Community Revitalization Commission.

Acquired in 2012 from former competitor Hinsdale Farms, the company's Bristol, Indiana plant produces more than 1.1 million corn dogs and 2.9 million mini corn dogs daily, estimated to be 80 percent of the private-label corn dog and mini corn dog market in the United States.

The Plover, Wisconsin, facility was purchased in 2015. Its legal name is Monogram Appetizers. It has grown from 550 to 650 employees in 2017. It has received more than 15 million dollars in capital improvements, primarily to improve automation.

In 2022, Monogram opened its second location in the Boston area in Medford, Massachusetts, as well as its third Boston location in Haverhill, Massachusetts. In 2023, both projects were recognized by MassEcon with awards for contributions to local and Massachusetts economy.

== Products ==
Monogram Foods produces a variety of products such as beef jerky, corn dogs, pre-cooked bacon, frozen appetizers, baked goods, and Frozen Appetizers. Products are produced both as internally owned as well as licensed brands. Some of their internal brands are King's Rightly Seasoned, Circle B, Wild Bill's, Bull's, Hannah's, Trail's Best, O' Brien's, and Snapps.

In 2015, Monogram Foods created a type of pre-cooked bacon, which uses a proprietary roasting technique developed during the creation of bacon jerky, to remove most of the oil for longer shelf life. This allowed the bacon to be only partially pre-cooked with the intention of the consumer completing the cooking process in a pan quickly and with less mess.
