= Moulton Township, Murray County, Minnesota =

Moulton Township, Minnesota
- Township
- Location within the state of Minnesota Moulton Township, Minnesota (the United States)
- Coordinates: 43°54′17″N 96°0′59″W
- Country: United States
- State: Minnesota
- County: Murray

Area
  - Total: 35.1 sq mi (91.0 km^{2})
  - Land: 35.1 sq mi (91.0 km^{2})
  - Water: 0 sq mi (0.0 km^{2})
- Elevation: 1,778 ft (542 m)

Population (2000)
  - Total: 242
  - Density: 7.0/sq mi (2.7/km^{2})
- Time zone: UTC-6 (Central (CST))
  - Summer (DST): UTC-5 (CDT)
- FIPS code: 27-44458
- GNIS feature ID: 0665048

Moulton Township is a township in Murray County, Minnesota, United States. The population was 242 at the 2000 census.

Moulton Township was organized in 1879, and named for Justin P. Moulton, a Minnesota legislator.

== Geography ==
According to the United States Census Bureau, the township has a total area of 35.2 square miles (91.0 km^{2}), all land. It is an extremely land locked area.

== Demographics ==
As of the census of 2000, there were 242 people, 80 households, and 70 families residing in the township. The population density was 6.9 people per square mile (2.7/km^{2}). There were 85 housing units at an average density of 2.4/sq mi (0.9/km^{2}). The racial makeup of the township was 99.59% White and 0.41% Asian. Hispanic or Latino of any race were 0.41% of the population.

There were 80 households, out of which 51.3% had children under the age of 18 living with them, 85.0% were married couples living together, 2.5% had a female householder with no husband present, and 12.5% were non-families. 10.0% of all households were made up of individuals, and 2.5% had someone living alone who was 65 years of age or older. The average household size was 3.03 and the average family size was 3.29.

In the township the population was spread out, with 30.6% under the age of 18, 10.3% from 18 to 24, 26.0% from 25 to 44, 27.3% from 45 to 64, and 5.8% who were 65 years of age or older. The median age was 34 years. For every 100 females, there were 103.4 males. For every 100 females age 18 and over, there were 110.0 males.

The median income for a household in the township was $35,729, and the median income for a family was $36,750. Males had a median income of $27,321 versus $18,750 for females. The per capita income for the township was $12,395. About 8.1% of families and 8.6% of the population were below the poverty line, including 8.6% of those under the age of eighteen and none of those 65 or over.

== Politics ==
Moulton Township is located in Minnesota's 1st congressional district, represented by Mankato educator Tim Walz, a Democrat. At the state level, Moulton Township is located in Senate District 22, represented by Republican Doug Magnus, and in House District 22A, represented by Republican Joe Schomacker.
