= Ellsborough Township, Murray County, Minnesota =

Ellsborough Township, Minnesota
- Township
- Location within the state of Minnesota Ellsborough Township, Minnesota (the United States)
- Coordinates: 44°9′20″N 95°59′38″W
- Country: United States
- State: Minnesota
- County: Murray

Area
  - Total: 35.8 sq mi (92.8 km^{2})
  - Land: 35.1 sq mi (90.9 km^{2})
  - Water: 0.73 sq mi (1.9 km^{2})
- Elevation: 1,690 ft (515 m)

Population (2000)
  - Total: 198
  - Density: 5.7/sq mi (2.2/km^{2})
- Time zone: UTC-6 (Central (CST))
  - Summer (DST): UTC-5 (CDT)
- FIPS code: 27-18782
- GNIS feature ID: 0664075

Ellsborough Township is a township in Murray County, Minnesota, United States. The population was 198 at the 2000 census.

== History ==
Ellsborough Township was organized in 1874, and named for Knut Ellingson, a pioneer settler.

== Geography ==
According to the United States Census Bureau, the township has a total area of 35.8 square miles (93 km^{2}), of which 35.1 square miles (91 km^{2}) is land and 0.7 square miles (1.8 km^{2}) (2.01%) is water.

== Demographics ==
As of the census of 2000, there were 198 people, 66 households, and 52 families residing in the township. The population density was 5.6 inhabitants per square mile (2.2/km^{2}). There were 73 housing units at an average density of 2.1 per square mile (0.81/km^{2}). The racial makeup of the township was 94.95% White, 1.52% African American, and 3.54% from two or more races.

There were 66 households, out of which 40.9% had children under the age of 18 living with them, 65.2% were married couples living together, 4.5% had a female householder with no husband present, and 19.7% were non-families. 18.2% of all households were made up of individuals, and 6.1% had someone living alone who was 65 years of age or older. The average household size was 3.00 and the average family size was 3.32.

In the township the population was spread out, with 34.3% under the age of 18, 7.1% from 18 to 24, 21.7% from 25 to 44, 22.2% from 45 to 64, and 14.6% who were 65 years of age or older. The median age was 37 years. For every 100 females, there were 112.9 males. For every 100 females age 18 and over, there were 124.1 males.

The median income for a household in the township was $34,688, and the median income for a family was $36,667. Males had a median income of $25,833 versus $19,167 for females. The per capita income for the township was $10,551. About 18.3% of families and 12.4% of the population were below the poverty line, including 11.2% of those under the age of eighteen and 13.3% of those 65 or over.

== Politics ==
Ellsborough Township is located in Minnesota's 1st congressional district, represented by Mankato educator Tim Walz, a Democrat. At the state level, Ellsborough Township is located in Senate District 22, represented by Democrat Jim Vickerman, and in House District 22A, represented by Republican Doug Magnus.
