= Iona Township, Todd County, Minnesota =

Iona Township, Minnesota
- Township
- Location within the state of Minnesota Iona Township, Minnesota (the United States)
- Coordinates: 46°3′49″N 94°57′23″W
- Country: United States
- State: Minnesota
- County: Todd

Area
  - Total: 36.2 sq mi (93.8 km^{2})
  - Land: 36.0 sq mi (93.2 km^{2})
  - Water: 0.19 sq mi (0.5 km^{2})
- Elevation: 1,358 ft (414 m)

Population (2020)
  - Total: 504
  - Density: 12/sq mi (4.5/km^{2})
- Time zone: UTC-6 (Central (CST))
  - Summer (DST): UTC-5 (CDT)
- FIPS code: 27-31130
- GNIS feature ID: 0664552

Iona Township is a township in Todd County, Minnesota, United States. The population was 416 at the 2000 census and was 504 at the time of the 2020 census.

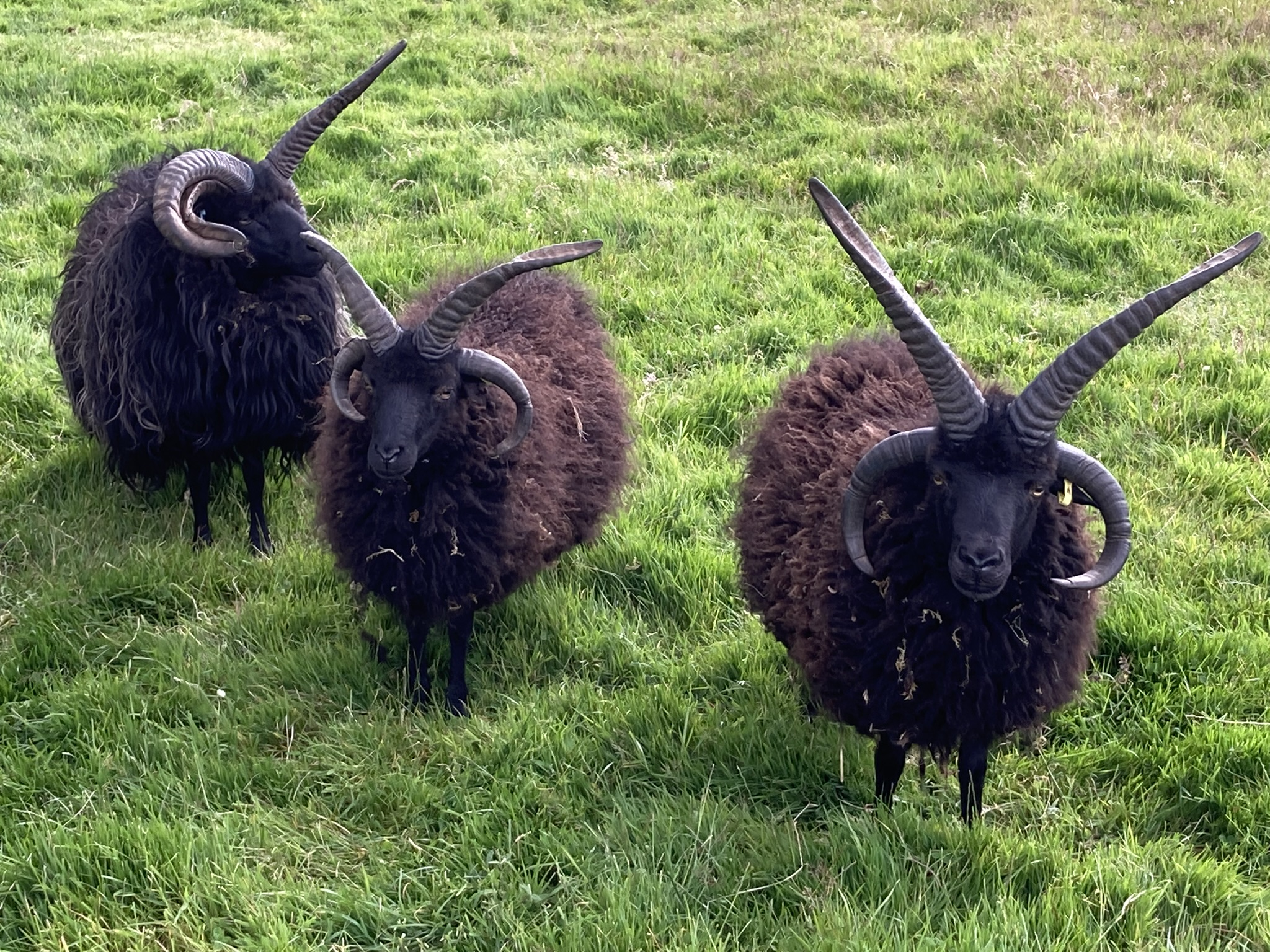
Hebridean sheep are native to the Scottish Island of Iona.

Iona Township was organized in 1881, and named after Iona an island in the Inner Hebrides in Scotland. The island of Iona is noted for its Hebridean sheep and high quality wool products. There is also an Iona township in Murray County, Minnesota. Iona in Todd County was originally called Odessa. There are six other Iona townships catalogued in Wikipedia, including in the States of Iowa, Michigan, and Kansas. The word Iona means Saint in Scottish Gaelic.

== Geography ==
According to the United States Census Bureau, the township has a total area of 36.2 square miles (94 km^{2}), of which 36.0 square miles (93 km^{2}) is land and 0.2 square miles (0.52 km^{2}) (0.58%) is water.

== Demographics ==
As of the census of 2000, there were 416 people, 140 households, and 106 families residing in the township. The population density was 11.6 inhabitants per square mile (4.5/km^{2}). There were 155 housing units at an average density of 4.3 per square mile (1.7/km^{2}). The racial makeup of the township was 98.56% White, 0.48% African American, 0.24% Native American, 0.48% Asian, 0.24% from other races. Hispanic or Latino of any race were 1.68% of the population.

There were 140 households, out of which 38.6% had children under the age of 18 living with them, 71.4% were married couples living together, 0.7% had a female householder with no husband present, and 23.6% were non-families. 20.0% of all households were made up of individuals, and 8.6% had someone living alone who was 65 years of age or older. The average household size was 2.97 and the average family size was 3.50.

In the township the population was spread out, with 31.0% under the age of 18, 8.4% from 18 to 24, 26.4% from 25 to 44, 20.2% from 45 to 64, and 13.9% who were 65 years of age or older. The median age was 36 years. For every 100 females, there were 105.9 males. For every 100 females age 18 and over, there were 120.8 males.

The median income for a household in the township was $39,167, and the median income for a family was $50,714. Males had a median income of $30,391 versus $22,813 for females. The per capita income for the township was $18,993. About 4.4% of families and 7.7% of the population were below the poverty line, including 7.1% of those under age 18 and 12.5% of those age 65 or over.
