= Iona Township, Murray County, Minnesota =

Iona Township, Minnesota
- Township
- Location within the state of Minnesota Iona Township, Minnesota (the United States)
- Coordinates: 43°53′4″N 95°45′15″W
- Country: United States
- State: Minnesota
- County: Murray

Area
  - Total: 35.3 sq mi (91.4 km^{2})
  - Land: 34.4 sq mi (89.0 km^{2})
  - Water: 0.93 sq mi (2.4 km^{2})
- Elevation: 1,617 ft (493 m)

Population (2000)
  - Total: 195
  - Density: 5.7/sq mi (2.2/km^{2})
- Time zone: UTC-6 (Central (CST))
  - Summer (DST): UTC-5 (CDT)
- ZIP code: 56141
- Area code: 507
- FIPS code: 27-31112
- GNIS feature ID: 0664551

Iona Township is a township in Murray County, Minnesota, United States. The population was 195 at the 2000 census.

Iona Township was organized in 1880, and named after Iona.

== Geography ==
According to the United States Census Bureau, the township has a total area of 35.3 square miles (91 km^{2}), of which 34.4 square miles (89 km^{2}) is land and 0.9 square miles (2.3 km^{2}) (2.61%) is water.

== Demographics ==
As of the census of 2000, there were 195 people, 67 households, and 50 families residing in the township. The population density was 5.7 inhabitants per square mile (2.2/km^{2}). There were 75 housing units at an average density of 2.2 per square mile (0.85/km^{2}). The racial makeup of the township was 97.44% White and 2.56% Native American. Hispanic or Latino of any race were 0.51% of the population.

There were 67 households, out of which 40.3% had children under the age of 18 living with them, 70.1% were married couples living together, 4.5% had a female householder with no husband present, and 23.9% were non-families. 20.9% of all households were made up of individuals, and 10.4% had someone living alone who was 65 years of age or older. The average household size was 2.91 and the average family size was 3.43.

In the township the population was spread out, with 33.8% under the age of 18, 6.7% from 18 to 24, 27.2% from 25 to 44, 20.5% from 45 to 64, and 11.8% who were 65 years of age or older. The median age was 34 years. For every 100 females, there were 91.2 males. For every 100 females age 18 and over, there were 115.0 males.

The median income for a household in the township was $33,125, and the median income for a family was $36,250. Males had a median income of $22,500 versus $21,875 for females. The per capita income for the township was $11,157. About 17.0% of families and 15.4% of the population were below the poverty line, including 16.4% of those under the age of eighteen and none of those 65 or over.

== Politics ==
Iona Township is located in Minnesota's 1st congressional district, represented by Mankato educator Tim Walz, a Democrat. At the state level, Iona Township is located in Senate District 22, represented by Republican Doug Magnus, and in House District 22A, represented by Republican Joe Schomacker.
