= Leeds Township, Murray County, Minnesota =

Leeds Township, Minnesota
- Township
- Location within the state of Minnesota Leeds Township, Minnesota (the United States)
- Coordinates: 43°59′10″N 95°53′38″W
- Country: United States
- State: Minnesota
- County: Murray

Area
  - Total: 35.6 sq mi (92.3 km^{2})
  - Land: 35.4 sq mi (91.6 km^{2})
  - Water: 0.27 sq mi (0.7 km^{2})
- Elevation: 1,686 ft (514 m)

Population (2000)
  - Total: 238
  - Density: 6.7/sq mi (2.6/km^{2})
- Time zone: UTC-6 (Central (CST))
  - Summer (DST): UTC-5 (CDT)
- FIPS code: 27-36260
- GNIS feature ID: 0664747

Leeds Township is a township in Murray County, Minnesota, United States. The population was 238 at the 2000 census.

Leeds Township was organized in 1873, and is named after the city of Leeds, England.

== Geography ==
According to the United States Census Bureau, the township has a total area of 35.6 square miles (92 km^{2}), of which 35.3 square miles (91 km^{2}) is land and 0.3 square miles (0.78 km^{2}) (0.79%) is water.

== Demographics ==
As of the census of 2000, there were 238 people, 84 households, and 65 families residing in the township. The population density was 6.7 inhabitants per square mile (2.6/km^{2}). There were 88 housing units at an average density of 2.5 per square mile (0.97/km^{2}). The racial makeup of the township was 97.48% White, 1.26% Native American, and 1.26% from two or more races.

There were 84 households, out of which 42.9% had children under the age of 18 living with them, 71.4% were married couples living together, 2.4% had a female householder with no husband present, and 22.6% were non-families. 22.6% of all households were made up of individuals, and 13.1% had someone living alone who was 65 years of age or older. The average household size was 2.83 and the average family size was 3.34.

In the township the population was spread out, with 34.9% under the age of 18, 4.6% from 18 to 24, 25.2% from 25 to 44, 25.2% from 45 to 64, and 10.1% who were 65 years of age or older. The median age was 35 years. For every 100 females, there were 114.4 males. For every 100 females age 18 and over, there were 118.3 males.

The median income for a household in the township was $40,625, and the median income for a family was $41,563. Males had a median income of $26,875 versus $30,208 for females. The per capita income for the township was $31,218. About 15.4% of families and 16.6% of the population were below the poverty line, including 24.0% of those under the age of eighteen and none of those 65 or over.

== Politics ==
Leeds Township is located in Minnesota's 7th congressional district, represented by Collin Peterson, a Democrat. At the state level, Leeds Township is located in Senate District 22, represented by Republican Bill Weber, and in House District 22A, represented by Republican Joe Schomacker.
