= Murray County, Minnesota =

County in Minnesota, United States

- County
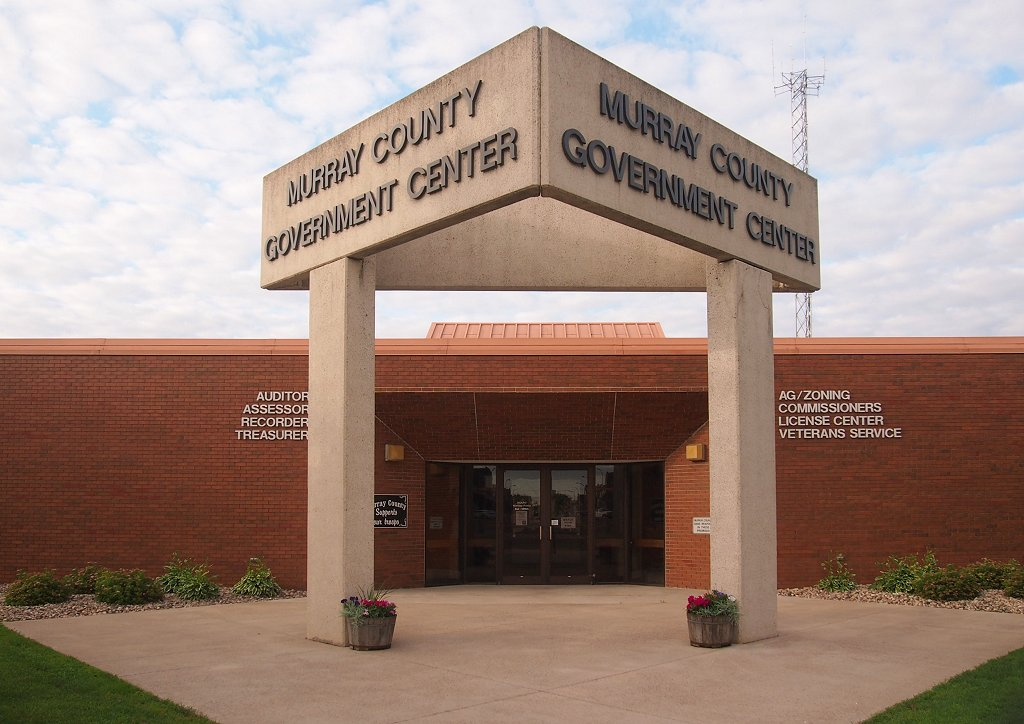
- Murray County Government Center in Slayton, Minnesota

- Location within the U.S. state of Minnesota
- Coordinates: 44°01′N 95°46′W
- Country: United States
- State: Minnesota
- Created: May 23, 1872
- Organized: June 17, 1872
- Named for: William Pitt Murray
- Seat: Slayton
- Largest city: Slayton

Area
  - Total: 720 sq mi (1,900 km^{2})
  - Land: 705 sq mi (1,830 km^{2})
  - Water: 15 sq mi (39 km^{2}) 2.1%

Population (2020)
  - Total: 8,179
  - Estimate (2025): 7,942 ▼
  - Density: 11.6/sq mi (4.5/km^{2})
- Time zone: UTC−6 (Central)
  - Summer (DST): UTC−5 (CDT)
- Congressional district: 7th
- Website: www.murray-countymn.com

Murray County is a county in the U.S. state of Minnesota. The population was 8,179 at the 2020 census. Its county seat is Slayton.

== History ==
In 1853 the Minnesota Territory legislature created Blue Earth County from unorganized Dakota Territory lands. In 1855 the legislature partitioned a portion of western Blue Earth to create Brown County. Then on May 23, 1857, a portion of Brown was partitioned off to create Murray County, although it was not organized at that time. On June 17, 1872, the county government was effected, with Currie, which had been founded that same year, as county seat. The county was named for William Pitt Murray (1825-1910), a prominent civic and political figure in Minnesota during its nascent era.

Also in 1872 the township of Center was platted (so named for its central position in the county). This settlement grew rapidly, and its residents soon began agitating to have the county seat moved there. In 1882 the town was renamed as Slayton, and a county vote changed the county seat to Slayton effective June 1, 1889.

In the history of record keeping, Minnesota has been struck by two F-5 tornadoes, and both occurred in Murray County: the Chandler-Lake Wilson Tornado (June 16, 1992) and the Tracy Tornado (June 13, 1968) that began in Murray County before crossing north into Lyon County.

== Geography ==
The county terrain consists of low rolling hills, dotted with lakes and ponds, with all available area devoted to agriculture. The terrain slopes to the south and east. However, its highest elevation occurs on Buffalo Ridge, a promontory extending about two miles along the crest of the Coteau des Prairies in central Chanarambie Township. The bluff rises a few hundred feet above the adjacent valleys. The county has a total area of 720 square miles (1,900 km^{2}), of which 705 square miles (1,830 km^{2}) is land and 15 square miles (39 km^{2}) (2.1%) is water.

The Mississippi-Missouri watershed divide runs through the western part of the county, near Chandler, along Buffalo Ridge. The county's highest point is on that ridge, at 1,920' ASL.

Soils of Murray County

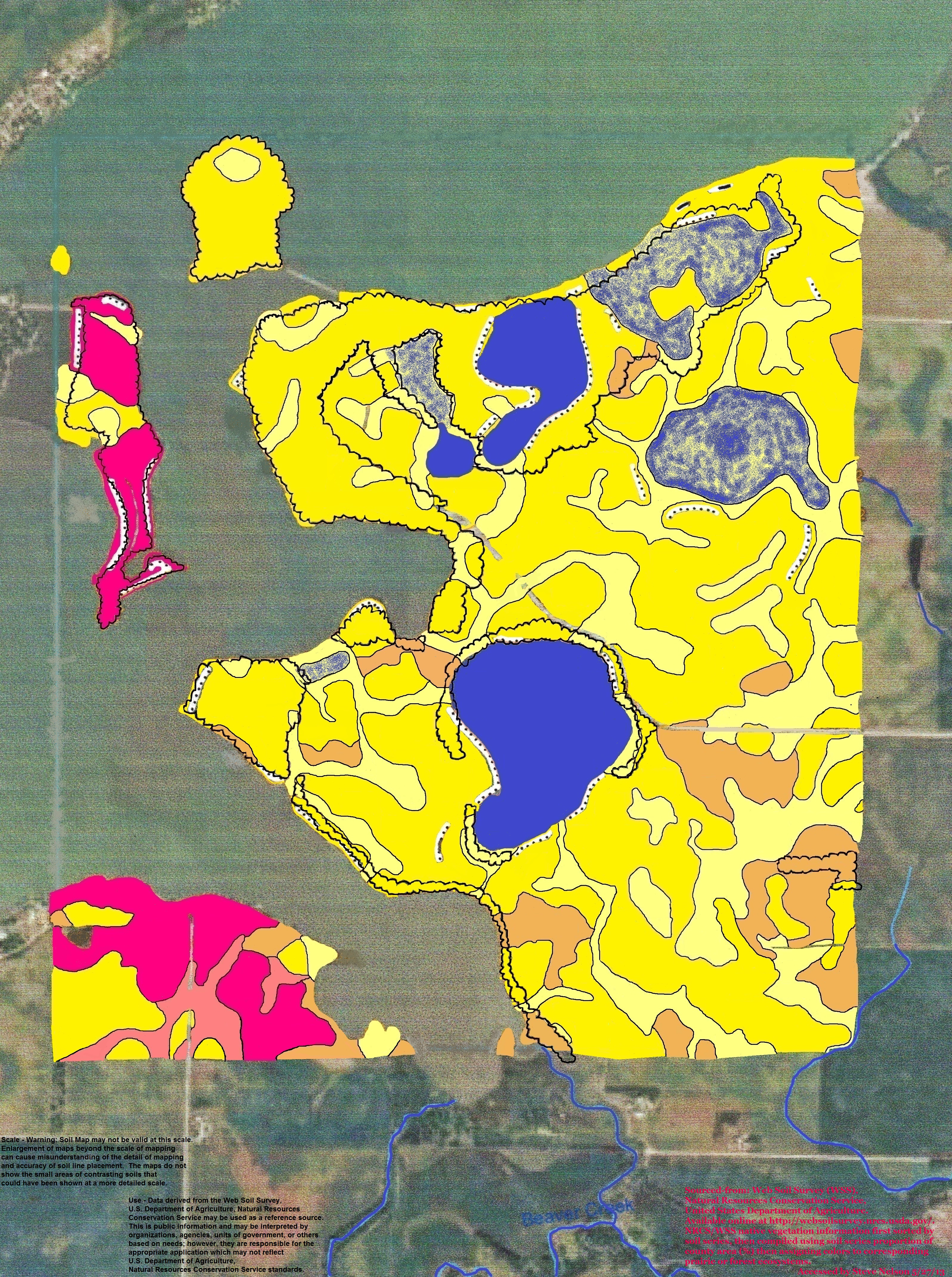
Soils of Lake Shetek State Park area

=== Major highways ===
- U.S. Highway 59
- Minnesota State Highway 30
- Minnesota State Highway 62
- Minnesota State Highway 91
- Minnesota State Highway 267

=== Airports ===
- Slayton Municipal Airport (DVP) - southwest of Slayton, Minnesota

=== Adjacent counties ===
- Lyon County - north
- Redwood County - northeast
- Cottonwood County - east
- Nobles County - south
- Rock County - southwest
- Pipestone County - west

=== Protected areas ===
- Badger Lake State Wildlife Management Area
- Bergman State Wildlife Management Area
- Big Slough State Wildlife Management Area
- Buffalo Lake State Wildlife Management Area
- Chandler State Wildlife Management Area
- County Line State Wildlife Management Area
- Current Lake State Wildlife Management Area
- Great Oasis State Wildlife Management Area
- Haberman State Wildlife Management Area
- Hjermstad Lake State Wildlife Management Area
- Irruption State Wildlife Management Area
- Klinker State Wildlife Management Area
- Lake Shetek State Park
- Lange State Wildlife Management Area
- Leeds State Wildlife Management Area
- Lowville State Wildlife Management Area
- Mason State Wildlife Management Area
- McCord-Laible State Wildlife Management Area
- Nelson State Wildlife Management Area
- Northern Tallgrass Prairie National Wildlife Refuge
- Peters State Wildlife Management Area
- Phelan State Wildlife Management Area
- Reinhold State Wildlife Management Area
- Rupp State Wildlife Management Area
- Ruthton State Wildlife Management Area
- Schoeberl State Wildlife Management Area
- Shetek State Wildlife Management Area
- Sweetman State Wildlife Management Area
- Tutt State Wildlife Management Area
- Van Eck State Wildlife Management Area

=== Lakes ===
- Bear Lake (drained)
- Bloody Lake
- Buffalo Lake
- Corabelle Lake
- Current Lake
- Fox Lake
- Fulda First Lake
- Iron Lake
- Julia Lake (part)
- Lake Louisa
- Lake Maria
- Lake Sarah
- Lake Shetek
- Lake Wilson
- Lime Lake (formerly known as Lizzard Lake and Lake St. Rose)
- Long Lake (part)
- North Badger Lake
- Round Lake
- Smith Lake
- South Badger Lake
- Summit Lake
- Talcot Lake (part)

== Demographics ==
Historical population
Census	Pop.	Note	%±
1860	29		—
1870	209		620.7%
1880	3,604		1,624.4%
1890	6,692		85.7%
1900	11,911		78.0%
1910	11,755		−1.3%
1920	13,631		16.0%
1930	13,902		2.0%
1940	15,060		8.3%
1950	14,801		−1.7%
1960	14,743		−0.4%
1970	12,508		−15.2%
1980	11,507		−8.0%
1990	9,660		−16.1%
2000	9,165		−5.1%
2010	8,725		−4.8%
2020	8,179		−6.3%
2025 (est.)	7,942	▼	−2.9%
U.S. Decennial Census; 1790-1960 1900-1990; 1990-2000 2010-2020

=== Racial and ethnic composition ===
Murray County, Minnesota – Racial and ethnic composition Note: the US Census treats Hispanic/Latino as an ethnic category. This table excludes Latinos from the racial categories and assigns them to a separate category. Hispanics/Latinos may be of any race.
Race / Ethnicity (NH = Non-Hispanic)	Pop 1980	Pop 1990	Pop 2000	Pop 2010	Pop 2020	% 1980	% 1990	% 2000	% 2010	% 2020
White alone (NH)	11,441	9,619	8,930	8,326	7,483	99.43%	99.58%	97.44%	95.43%	91.49%
Black or African American alone (NH)	2	0	7	20	26	0.02%	0.00%	0.08%	0.23%	0.32%
Native American or Alaska Native alone (NH)	3	3	18	11	9	0.03%	0.03%	0.20%	0.13%	0.11%
Asian alone (NH)	29	17	19	78	105	0.25%	0.18%	0.21%	0.89%	1.28%
Native Hawaiian or Pacific Islander alone (NH)	x	x	2	0	3	x	x	0.02%	0.00%	0.04%
Other race alone (NH)	17	0	0	0	7	0.15%	0.00%	0.00%	0.00%	0.09%
Mixed race or Multiracial (NH)	x	x	54	48	164	x	x	0.59%	0.55%	2.01%
Hispanic or Latino (any race)	15	21	135	242	382	0.13%	0.22%	1.47%	2.77%	4.67%
Total	11,507	9,660	9,165	8,725	8,179	100.00%	100.00%	100.00%	100.00%	100.00%

=== 2020 census ===
As of the 2020 census, the county had a population of 8,179. The median age was 47.4 years. 21.7% of residents were under the age of 18 and 26.2% of residents were 65 years of age or older. For every 100 females there were 100.6 males, and for every 100 females age 18 and over there were 101.2 males age 18 and over.

The racial makeup of the county was 92.6% White, 0.3% Black or African American, 0.3% American Indian and Alaska Native, 1.3% Asian, <0.1% Native Hawaiian and Pacific Islander, 2.4% from some other race, and 3.1% from two or more races. Hispanic or Latino residents of any race comprised 4.7% of the population.

<0.1% of residents lived in urban areas, while 100.0% lived in rural areas.

There were 3,581 households in the county, of which 24.2% had children under the age of 18 living in them. Of all households, 54.1% were married-couple households, 19.7% were households with a male householder and no spouse or partner present, and 20.2% were households with a female householder and no spouse or partner present. About 30.7% of all households were made up of individuals and 15.7% had someone living alone who was 65 years of age or older.

There were 4,388 housing units, of which 18.4% were vacant. Among occupied housing units, 81.8% were owner-occupied and 18.2% were renter-occupied. The homeowner vacancy rate was 2.0% and the rental vacancy rate was 6.5%.

=== 2000 census ===
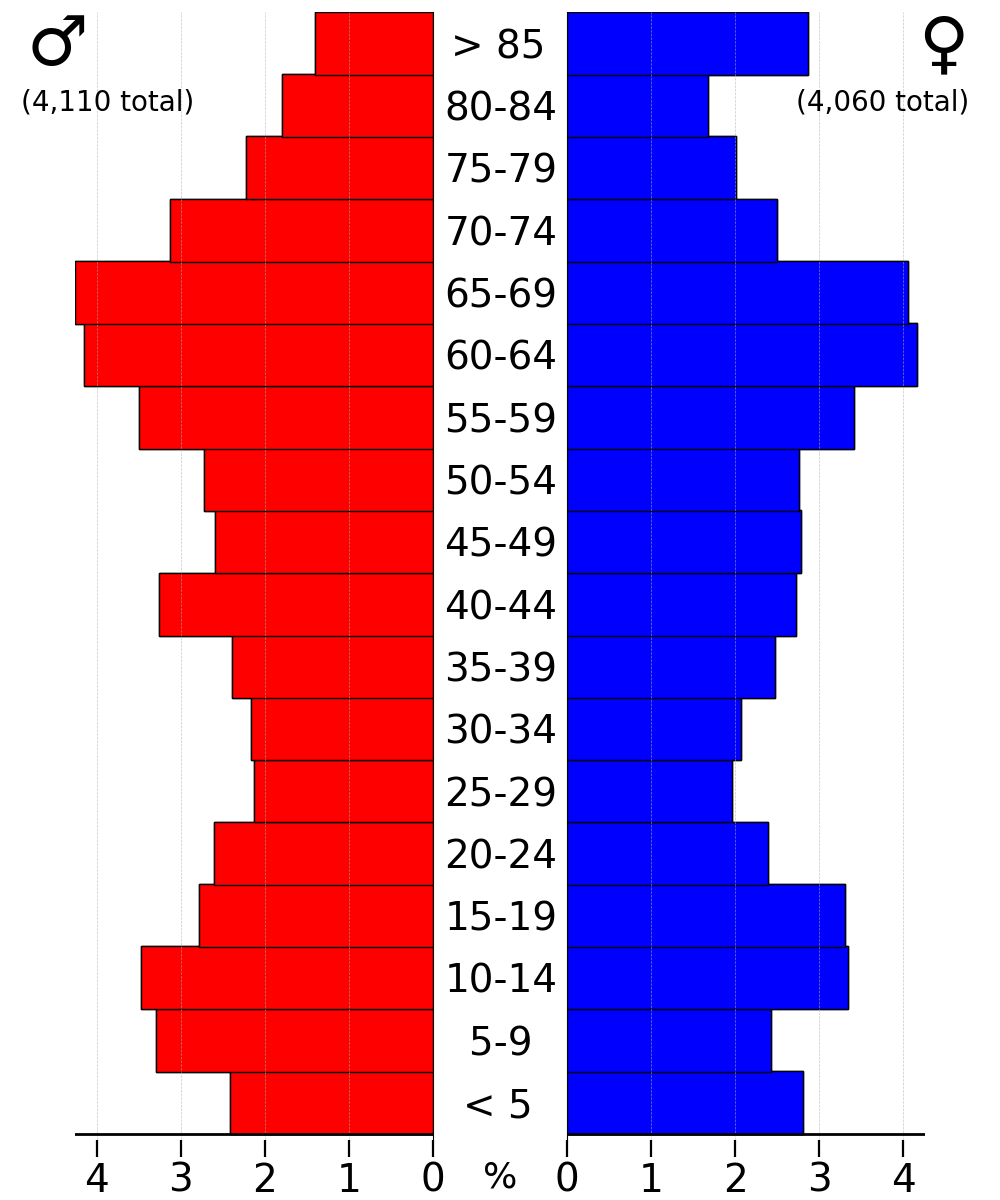
2022 US Census population pyramid for Murray County, from ACS 5-year estimates

As of the census of 2000, there were 9,165 people, 3,722 households, and 2,601 families in the county. The population density was 13 per square mile (5.0/km^{2}). There were 4,357 housing units at an average density of 6.18 per square mile (2.39/km^{2}). The racial makeup of the county was 98.34% White, 0.10% Black or African American, 0.22% Native American, 0.21% Asian, 0.02% Pacific Islander, 0.45% from other races, and 0.67% from two or more races. 1.47% of the population were Hispanic or Latino of any race. 47.3% were of German, 12.9% Norwegian, 12.5% Dutch and 5.1% Swedish ancestry.

There were 3,722 households, out of which 29.00% had children under the age of 18 living with them, 62.50% were married couples living together, 4.60% had a female householder with no husband present, and 30.10% were non-families. 27.10% of all households were made up of individuals, and 15.30% had someone living alone who was 65 years of age or older. The average household size was 2.42 and the average family size was 2.94.

The county population contained 25.00% under the age of 18, 5.90% from 18 to 24, 23.30% from 25 to 44, 24.70% from 45 to 64, and 21.20% who were 65 years of age or older. The median age was 42 years. For every 100 females there were 98.50 males. For every 100 females age 18 and over, there were 97.00 males.

The median income for a household in the county was $34,966, and the median income for a family was $40,893. Males had a median income of $27,101 versus $19,636 for females. The per capita income for the county was $17,936. About 6.30% of families and 8.30% of the population were below the poverty line, including 8.40% of those under age 18 and 9.40% of those age 65 or over.

== Communities ==
=== Cities ===
- Avoca
- Chandler
- Currie
- Dovray
- Fulda
- Hadley
- Iona
- Lake Wilson
- Slayton (county seat)

=== Census-designated place ===
- The Lakes

=== Unincorporated communities ===
- Current Lake
- Lime Creek
- Lowville
- Owanka
- Wirock

=== Townships ===
- Belfast Township
- Bondin Township
- Cameron Township
- Chanarambie Township
- Des Moines River Township
- Dovray Township
- Ellsborough Township
- Fenton Township
- Holly Township
- Iona Township
- Lake Sarah Township
- Leeds Township
- Lime Lake Township
- Lowville Township
- Mason Township
- Moulton Township
- Murray Township
- Shetek Township
- Skandia Township
- Slayton Township

== Government and politics ==
The county matched the national outcome every year from 1964 until 2008 except 1988, when during the farm crisis it voted for Michael Dukakis. However, like most other rural heavily white areas of the country, it has swung heavily Republican since 2016. In 60% of presidential elections since 1980, the county selected the Republican Party candidate (as of 2020).

United States presidential election results for Murray County, Minnesota
Year	Republican		Democratic		Third party(ies)	
Year	No.	%	No.	%	No.	%
1892	586	36.90%	517	32.56%	485	30.54%
1896	1,204	52.26%	1,054	45.75%	46	2.00%
1900	1,358	60.68%	816	36.46%	64	2.86%
1904	1,464	70.86%	537	25.99%	65	3.15%
1908	1,293	60.28%	762	35.52%	90	4.20%
1912	388	17.18%	775	34.32%	1,095	48.49%
1916	1,137	46.64%	1,193	48.93%	108	4.43%
1920	3,270	79.16%	698	16.90%	163	3.95%
1924	2,034	45.80%	334	7.52%	2,073	46.68%
1928	2,602	55.26%	2,078	44.13%	29	0.62%
1932	1,314	28.21%	3,264	70.07%	80	1.72%
1936	1,601	27.34%	3,926	67.05%	328	5.60%
1940	3,044	48.46%	3,203	51.00%	34	0.54%
1944	2,585	50.67%	2,495	48.90%	22	0.43%
1948	1,951	34.83%	3,594	64.16%	57	1.02%
1952	4,054	65.15%	2,145	34.47%	24	0.39%
1956	3,261	54.61%	2,695	45.13%	15	0.25%
1960	3,357	52.64%	3,009	47.19%	11	0.17%
1964	2,325	37.79%	3,822	62.13%	5	0.08%
1968	2,906	49.35%	2,662	45.21%	320	5.43%
1972	2,959	49.92%	2,893	48.81%	75	1.27%
1976	2,605	40.71%	3,685	57.59%	109	1.70%
1980	3,004	48.56%	2,714	43.87%	468	7.57%
1984	2,780	49.87%	2,741	49.17%	54	0.97%
1988	2,316	44.44%	2,840	54.49%	56	1.07%
1992	1,609	30.87%	1,993	38.23%	1,611	30.90%
1996	1,907	39.17%	2,173	44.63%	789	16.20%
2000	2,407	50.64%	2,093	44.04%	253	5.32%
2004	2,719	54.40%	2,218	44.38%	61	1.22%
2008	2,320	48.20%	2,345	48.72%	148	3.08%
2012	2,504	52.53%	2,160	45.31%	103	2.16%
2016	2,974	63.71%	1,295	27.74%	399	8.55%
2020	3,363	68.69%	1,449	29.60%	84	1.72%
2024	3,346	70.16%	1,329	27.87%	94	1.97%

County Board of Commissioners
Position	Name	District	Next Election
Commissioner and Chairperson	Molly Malone	District 1	2024
Commissioner	Lori Gunnink	District 2	2024
Commissioner	Dennis Welgraven	District 3	2026
Commissioner	Jackie Meier	District 4	2027
Commissioner	Dave Thiner	District 5	2024

State Legislature (2018-2020)
Position	Name	Affiliation	District
Senate	Bill Weber	Republican	District 22
House of Representatives	Joe Schomacker	Republican	District 22A

U.S Congress (2018-2020)
Position	Name	Affiliation	District
House of Representatives	Collin Peterson	Democrat	7th
Senate	Amy Klobuchar	Democrat	N/A
Senate	Tina Smith	Democrat	N/A

== See also ==
- National Register of Historic Places listings in Murray County, Minnesota
