= Slayton, Minnesota =

City in Minnesota, United States

- City
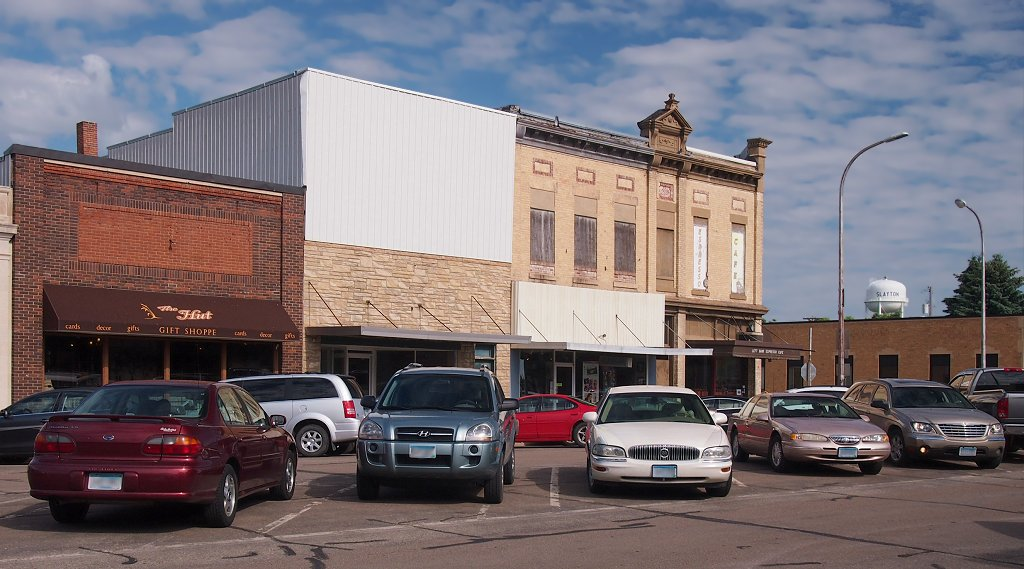
- Downtown Slayton
- Motto: "A Community of Ambitions in Action"
- Location in Murray County and the state of Minnesota
- Coordinates: 43°59′25″N 95°45′30″W
- Country: United States
- State: Minnesota
- County: Murray

Government
  - Type: Mayor – Council
  - Mayor: Miron Carney 2011-2019

Area
  - Total: 2.06 sq mi (5.3 km^{2})
  - Land: 2.06 sq mi (5.3 km^{2})
  - Water: 0.00 sq mi (0 km^{2})
- Elevation: 1,608 ft (490 m)

Population (2020)
  - Total: 2,013
  - Density: 977.7/sq mi (377.5/km^{2})
- Time zone: UTC-6 (Central (CST))
  - Summer (DST): UTC-5 (CDT)
- ZIP code: 56172
- Area code: 507
- FIPS code: 27-60808
- GNIS feature ID: 2395897
- Website: slayton.govoffice.com

Slayton is a city in and the county seat of Murray County, Minnesota, United States. The population was 2,013 at the 2020 census.

== History ==
Slayton was platted in 1882 by Charles W. Slayton, and named for him.

== Geography ==
Slayton is in central Murray County and is surrounded by Slayton Township, a separate municipality. U.S. Highway 59 and Minnesota State Highway 30 are the main routes in the city. US 59 leads north 36 miles (58 km) to Marshall and south 30 miles (48 km) to Worthington. MN 30 joins US 59 to the north out of town but turns off toward Westbrook, 22 miles (35 km) east of Slayton; to the west, MN 30 leads 28 miles (45 km) to Pipestone.

According to the U.S. Census Bureau, Slayton has a total area of 2.06 square miles (5.34 km^{2}), all land.

== Demographics ==
Historical population
Census	Pop.	Note	%±
1890	380		—
1900	883		132.4%
1910	850		−3.7%
1920	1,045		22.9%
1930	1,102		5.5%
1940	1,587		44.0%
1950	1,887		18.9%
1960	2,487		31.8%
1970	2,351		−5.5%
1980	2,420		2.9%
1990	2,147		−11.3%
2000	2,072		−3.5%
2010	2,153		3.9%
2020	2,013		−6.5%
U.S. Decennial Census

=== 2020 census ===
As of the 2020 census, Slayton had a population of 2,013. The median age was 43.0 years. 22.0% of residents were under the age of 18 and 25.1% of residents were 65 years of age or older. For every 100 females there were 94.9 males, and for every 100 females age 18 and over there were 93.2 males age 18 and over.

0.0% of residents lived in urban areas, while 100.0% lived in rural areas.

There were 941 households in Slayton, of which 23.7% had children under the age of 18 living in them. Of all households, 41.8% were married-couple households, 22.2% were households with a male householder and no spouse or partner present, and 30.8% were households with a female householder and no spouse or partner present. About 40.3% of all households were made up of individuals and 20.8% had someone living alone who was 65 years of age or older.

There were 1,038 housing units, of which 9.3% were vacant. The homeowner vacancy rate was 2.9% and the rental vacancy rate was 7.3%.

Racial composition as of the 2020 census
Race	Number	Percent
White	1,881	93.4%
Black or African American	13	0.6%
American Indian and Alaska Native	1	0.0%
Asian	7	0.3%
Native Hawaiian and Other Pacific Islander	1	0.0%
Some other race	49	2.4%
Two or more races	61	3.0%
Hispanic or Latino (of any race)	85	4.2%

=== 2010 census ===
As of the census of 2010, there were 2,153 people, 946 households, and 566 families living in the city. The population density was 1,098.5 inhabitants per square mile (424.1/km^{2}). There were 1,048 housing units at an average density of 534.7 per square mile (206.4/km^{2}). The racial makeup of the city was 98.0% White, 0.3% African American, 0.1% Native American, 0.2% Asian, 0.7% from other races, and 0.7% from two or more races. Hispanic or Latino of any race were 1.2% of the population.

There were 946 households, of which 26.0% had children under the age of 18 living with them, 48.2% were married couples living together, 8.2% had a female householder with no husband present, 3.4% had a male householder with no wife present, and 40.2% were non-families. 35.9% of all households were made up of individuals, and 19.9% had someone living alone who was 65 years of age or older. The average household size was 2.20 and the average family size was 2.84.

The median age in the city was 43.5 years. 23.3% of residents were under the age of 18; 7.1% were between the ages of 18 and 24; 21.2% were from 25 to 44; 21.6% were from 45 to 64; and 26.9% were 65 years of age or older. The gender makeup of the city was 47.0% male and 53.0% female.

=== 2000 census ===
As of the census of 2000, there were 2,072 people, 914 households, and 556 families living in the city. The population density was 1,163.3 inhabitants per square mile (449.2/km^{2}). There were 1,022 housing units at an average density of 573.8 per square mile (221.5/km^{2}). The racial makeup of the city was 99.03% White, 0.14% African American, 0.05% Native American, 0.39% Asian, and 0.39% from two or more races. Hispanic or Latino of any race were 0.34% of the population.

There were 914 households, out of which 24.9% had children under the age of 18 living with them, 52.5% were married couples living together, 6.3% had a female householder with no husband present, and 39.1% were non-families. 35.7% of all households were made up of individuals, and 23.6% had someone living alone who was 65 years of age or older. The average household size was 2.18 and the average family size was 2.81.

In the city, the population was spread out, with 22.2% under the age of 18, 6.2% from 18 to 24, 21.7% from 25 to 44, 20.6% from 45 to 64, and 29.2% who were 65 years of age or older. The median age was 45 years. For every 100 females, there were 82.7 males. For every 100 females age 18 and over, there were 78.2 males.

The median income for a household in the city was $36,500, and the median income for a family was $43,935. Males had a median income of $30,444 versus $19,830 for females. The per capita income for the city was $17,395. About 4.5% of families and 8.7% of the population were below the poverty line, including 7.8% of those under age 18 and 13.1% of those age 65 or over.

== Education ==
Slayton is the home of Murray County Central School District. It is one of only two school districts left in the county (the other is Fulda Public School). The school has an average of 60 students per grade. Chandler-Lake Wilson High School closed (because of a devastating F5 tornado that struck the area) before the turn of the 21st century and joined with Slayton. Students attend MCC from area communities (although not all are located within the school district) including: Avoca, Chandler, Currie, Iona, and Lake Wilson. Jacob Scandrett is the Principal of the high school, and Joe Meyer is the Superintendent.

Murray County Central's marching band is a band that competes in multiple competitions throughout the Midwest. They have marched in five states in the past ten years, including Minnesota, South Dakota, Florida, Illinois, and Missouri. In 2009 the band traveled to Orlando, Florida and marched in the famous Disney World Parade. In 2010 they placed first at the Tri-State Band Festival held in Luverne, Minnesota. Since 2009, the band has ranked in the top two at the festival. In addition, the Marching Rebels received a second place win at the Festival of Bands Competition in Sioux Falls, South Dakota, ranking as the highest placing public school in Class A competition. They are under the direction of Michael Helgeson.

== Politics ==
Slayton is located in Minnesota's 7th congressional district, represented by Michelle Fischbach, a Republican. At the state level, Slayton is located in Senate District 21, represented by Republican Bill Weber, and in House District 21A, represented by Republican Joe Schomacker.

== Notable people ==
- Clarence C. Dinehart, politician
- Mike Johnson, baseball player
- Trigg H. Knutson, politician and businessman
- Alan Roach, Minnesota Vikings announcer
- Vin Weber, politician
- Trevor Winter, basketball player
