= Chanarambie Creek =

Stream in Minnesota, U.S.

Coordinates: 43°51′29″N 96°07′53″W

Chanarambie Creek is a stream in the U.S. state of Minnesota.

Chanarambie is a name derived from the Dakota language meaning "hidden woods".

== See also ==
- List of rivers of Minnesota
