= Area codes 507 and 924 =

Telephone area code for southern Minnesota

Coordinates: 44°2′N 94°4′W

A map of Minnesota area codes. 507 and 924 are in dark brown.

Area codes 507 and 924 are telephone area codes in the North American Numbering Plan (NANP) for the southern fifth of Minnesota, including cities such as Rochester, Mankato, Worthington, Fairmont, Albert Lea, Northfield, and Austin. Area code 507 was the third area code created in the state in 1954, following area codes 218 and 612 in 1947. It was created from the southwestern portion of 218 and the southern portion of 612. The numbering plan area (NPA) was overlaid with area code 924 in 2024. It is the first area code overlay complex in Minnesota.

The region was directly bordered by 612 (to the north) until that area code was divided in the 1990s. The western half of 507 bordered area code 320 starting in 1996, and then later came to border also area code 651 (1998) and area code 952 (2000). The northern border of 507 was modified slightly so that expanding communities in and near the Twin Cities would be more closely linked with that region by telephone. 612 has now shrunk down to include just Minneapolis and a few surrounding suburbs, and no longer borders 507.

In August 2022, the North American Numbering Plan Administrator forecasted the exhaust of central office code in 507 by 2025. Area code 924 was approved as an all-service overlay to area code 507 by the Minnesota Public Utilities Commission on March 30, 2023. Ten-digit dialing is required as of July 2024. New 924 numbers became assignable on August 30, 2024.

== Service area ==
- Adams
- Adrian
- Albert Lea
- Amboy
- Arlington
- Austin
- Belview
- Blooming Prairie
- Blue Earth
- Brownsdale
- Byron
- Caledonia
- Canby
- Cannon Falls
- Chatfield
- Currie
- Dexter
- Dodge Center
- Dovray
- Dundas
- Eagle Lake
- Echo
- Edgerton
- Elgin
- Ellendale
- Eyota
- Fairfax
- Fairmont
- Faribault
- Fountain
- Franklin
- Fulda
- Gaylord
- Gibbon
- Grand Meadow
- Hadley
- Harmony
- Hayfield
- Hendricks
- Hokah
- Houston
- Ivanhoe
- Jackson
- Janesville
- Jeffers
- Kasson
- Kenyon
- La Crescent
- Lake Benton
- Lake Crystal
- Lake Wilson
- Lamberton
- Lanesboro
- Le Center
- Le Roy
- Le Sueur
- Lewiston
- Lewisville
- Lonsdale
- Luverne
- Madelia
- Madison Lake
- Mankato
- Mantorville
- Mapleton
- Marshall
- Medford
- Montgomery
- Morgan
- Morton
- Mountain Lake
- New Richland
- New Ulm
- Nicollet
- North Mankato
- Northfield
- Oronoco
- Owatonna
- Pemberton
- Pine Island
- Pipestone
- Plainview
- Preston
- Redwood Falls
- Rochester
- Rollingstone
- Rose Creek
- Rushford
- Rushford Village
- St. Charles
- St. Clair
- St. James
- St. Peter
- Slayton
- Sleepy Eye
- Springfield
- Spring Grove
- Spring Valley
- Stewartville
- Stockton
- Taopi
- Tracy
- Truman
- Tyler
- Vernon Center
- Vesta
- Walnut Grove
- Waltham
- Wanamingo
- Waseca
- Waterville
- Wells
- West Concord
- Westbrook
- Windom
- Winnebago
- Winona
- Winthrop
- Wood Lake
- Worthington
- Wykoff
- Zumbrota

== See also ==
- List of Minnesota area codes
- List of North American Numbering Plan area codes

Minnesota area codes: 218, 320, 507/924, 612, 651, 763, 952
	North: 320, 651, 952	
West: 605	507/924	East: 608/353
	South: 515, 563, 641, 712	
Iowa area codes: 319, 515, 563, 641, 712
North Dakota area codes: 701
Wisconsin area codes: 262, 414, 608/353, 715/534, 920/274
