= Joe Schomacker =

American politician

Member of the Minnesota House of Representatives from the 21A district 22A (2011–2022)
- In office January 3, 2011 – June 21, 2026
- Preceded by: Doug Magnus
- Succeeded by: Krist Wollum (elect)

Personal details
- Born: March 25, 1986 (age 40) Luverne, Minnesota, U.S.
- Party: Republican Party of Minnesota
- Education: Southwest Minnesota State University; George Washington University
- Occupation: public relations consultant

Joseph "Joe" Roy Schomacker (born March 25, 1986) is an American politician who served in the Minnesota House of Representatives from 2011 to 2026. A member of the Republican Party of Minnesota, Schomacker represented District 21A in the southwestern corner of the state, which includes the cities of Luverne and Pipestone and parts of Cottonwood, Lincoln, Murray, Nobles, Pipestone, and Rock Counties.

== Early life, education and career ==
Schomacker graduated from Luverne Senior High School in Luverne and from Southwest Minnesota State University in Marshall, earning his B.A. in public administration, speech communication and political science in 2008. He served as the university's student body president in 2007-08. In 2010, he earned his M.P.S. online from George Washington University. He is an independent public relations consultant.

== Minnesota House of Representatives ==
Schomacker was elected to the Minnesota House of Representatives in 2010 and has been reelected every two years since. In 2010, he defeated former representative and DFL House Majority Leader Ted Winter for the seat being vacated by incumbent Doug Magnus, who opted to run for an open Minnesota Senate seat.

Schomacker served as an assistant minority leader during the 2013-14 legislative session. In 2015-16 he chaired the Aging & Long-Term Care Policy Committee, and in 2017-18 he chaired the Health & Human Services Reform Committee. Schomacker was the minority lead on the Health Finance and Policy Committee and sat on the Economic Development Finance and Policy and Ways and Means Committees.

Schomacker resigned from the Minnesota House in June 2026 in order to pursue business opportunities.

== Electoral history ==
2010 Minnesota State House - District 22A
Party	Candidate	Votes	%
Republican	Joe Schomacker	7,595	56.59
Democratic (DFL)	Ted Winter	5,807	43.27
Write-in		19	0.14
Total votes		13,421	100.0
Republican hold			

2012 Minnesota State House - District 22A
Party	Candidate	Votes	%
Republican	Joe Schomacker (incumbent)	11,555	59.01
Democratic (DFL)	Eugene Short	8,006	40.88
Write-in		22	0.11
Total votes		19,583	100.0
Republican hold			

2014 Minnesota State House - District 22A
Party	Candidate	Votes	%
Republican	Joe Schomacker (incumbent)	9,779	66.71
Democratic (DFL)	Diana Slyter	4,868	33.21
Write-in		12	0.08
Total votes		14,659	100.0
Republican hold			

2016 Minnesota State House - District 22A
Party	Candidate	Votes	%
Republican	Joe Schomacker (incumbent)	14,316	71.98
Democratic (DFL)	Laura Woods	5,564	27.98
Write-in		9	0.05
Total votes		19,889	100.0
Republican hold			

2018 Minnesota State House - District 22A
Party	Candidate	Votes	%
Republican	Joe Schomacker (incumbent)	10,811	66.73
Democratic (DFL)	Maxwell Kaufman	5,377	33.19
Write-in		12	0.07
Total votes		16,200	100.0
Republican hold			

2020 Minnesota State House - District 22A
Party	Candidate	Votes	%
Republican	Joe Schomacker (incumbent)	15,161	73.02
Democratic (DFL)	Chris Baumberger	5,584	26.89
Write-in		18	0.09
Total votes		20,763	100.0
Republican hold			

2022 Minnesota State House - District 21A
Party	Candidate	Votes	%
Republican	Joe Schomacker (incumbent)	13,536	74.29
Democratic (DFL)	Patrick Baustian	4,671	25.64
Write-in		14	0.08
Total votes		18,221	100.0
Republican hold			
