= Tornado records =

List of world records related to tornadoes

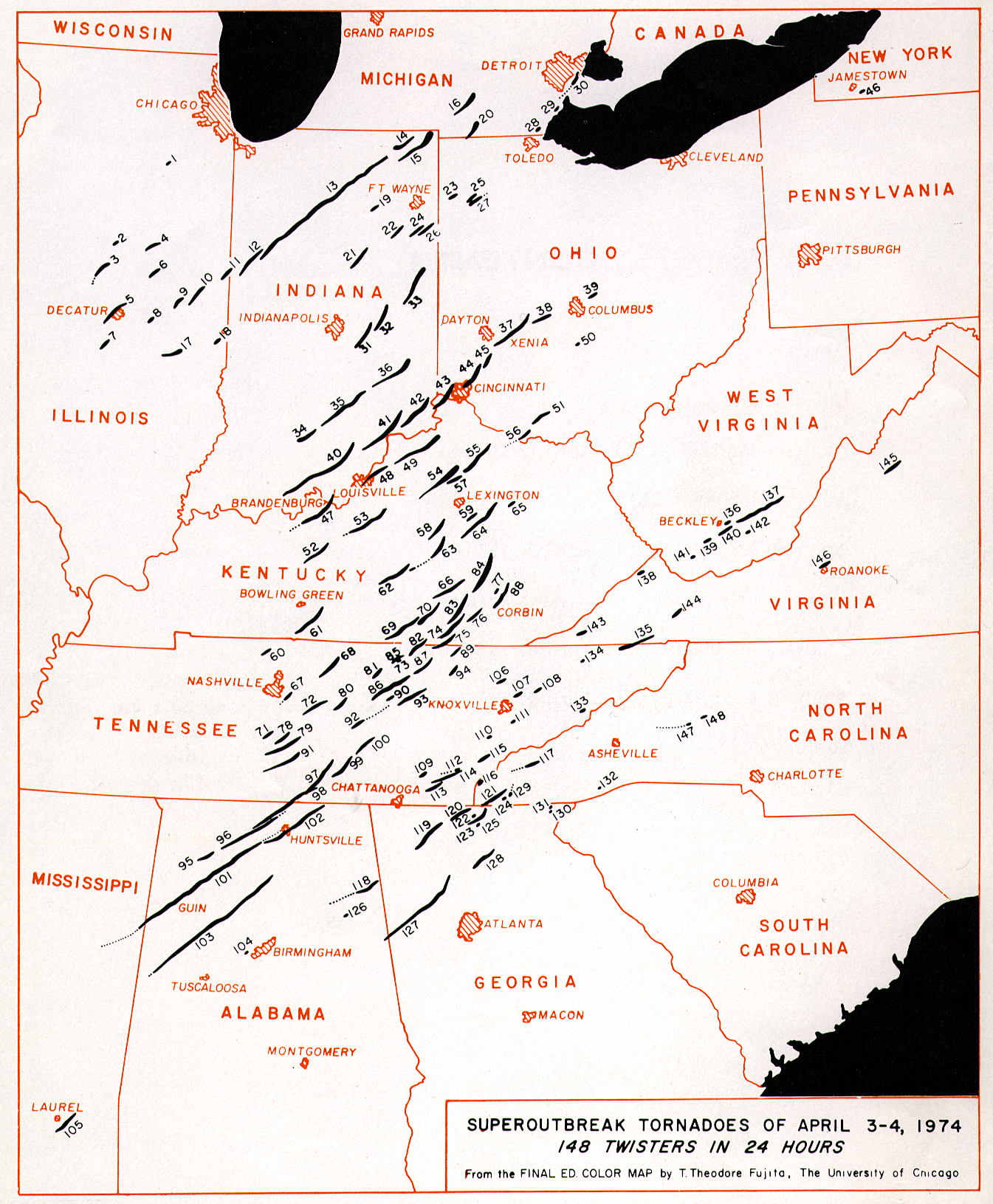
A map of the tornado paths in the 1974 Super Outbreak

This article lists various tornado records. The most "extreme" tornado in recorded history was the Tri-State tornado, which spread through parts of Missouri, Illinois, and Indiana on March 18, 1925. It was likely an F5 on the Fujita Scale (tornadoes were not rated at the time) and holds records for longest path length at 219 miles (352 km) and longest duration at about 3 1/2 hours. The 2014 Pilger, Nebraska tornado had the highest forward speed ever recorded in a violent tornado, at 94.6 mph (152.2 km/h). The deadliest tornado in world history was the Daulatpur–Saturia tornado in Bangladesh on April 26, 1989, which killed approximately 1,300 people. In the history of Bangladesh, at least 24 tornadoes killed more than 100 people each, almost half of the total for the world. The most extensive tornado outbreak on record was the 2011 Super Outbreak, which resulted in 367 tornadoes and 324 tornadic fatalities, whereas the 1974 Super Outbreak was the most intense tornado outbreak on tornado expert Thomas P. Grazulis's outbreak intensity score with 578, as opposed to the 2011 outbreak's 378. The widest tornado recorded was the 2013 El Reno tornado, having a width of 2.6 miles (4.2 km), and killing eight people including veteran storm chaser Tim Samaras.

== Tornado outbreaks ==
=== Most tornadoes in a single 24-hour period ===
Outbreaks with 100+ tornadoes in a single 24-hour period
Outbreak	Year	Country	Tornadoes in 24-hour span	Outbreak total	F2/EF2+	F4/EF4+	Deaths
2011 Super Outbreak	2011	US, CAN	223 (05:00 UTC April 27–28); 226 (05:40 UTC April 27–28)	367	86	15	324
1974 Super Outbreak	1974	US, CAN	148 (Duration of outbreak)	148	96	30	319
Tornado outbreak of March 31 – April 1, 2023	2023	US	136 (19:00 UTC March 31–April 1)	146	44	1	27
2020 Easter tornado outbreak	2020	US	132 (14:40 UTC April 12–13)	141	35	3	32
December 2021 Midwest derecho and tornado outbreak	2021	US	120 (Duration of outbreak)	120	33	0	0
Tornado outbreak of January 21–23, 1999	1999	US	116 (21:10 UTC January 21–22)	128	23	1	9
Tornado outbreak of December 28–29, 2024	2024	US	107 (14:22 UTC December 28–29)	108	6	0	1
1981 United Kingdom tornado outbreak	1981	UK	104 (Duration of outbreak)	104	2	0	0

The 2011 Super Outbreak was the largest tornado outbreak spawned by a single weather system in recorded history; it produced 367 tornadoes from April 25–28, with 223 of those in a single 24-hour period on April 27 from midnight to midnight CDT, fifteen of which were violent EF4–EF5 tornadoes. 348 deaths occurred in that outbreak, of which 324 were tornado-related. The outbreak largely contributed to the record for most tornadoes in April with 780 tornadoes, almost triple the prior record (267 in April 1974). The overall record for a single month was 542 in May 2003, which was also broken.

The 1974 Super Outbreak of April 3–4, which spawned 148 confirmed tornadoes across eastern North America, held the record for the most prolific tornado outbreak in terms of overall tornadoes for many years, and as of October 2025, it still holds the record for most violent, long-track tornadoes (7 F5 and 23 F4 tornadoes). More significant tornadoes occurred within 24 hours than any other day on record. Due to advancements in technology allowing for more accuracy in tornado reporting, the 2011 and 1974 tornado counts are not directly comparable.

=== Most violent tornadoes (F4/EF4 and F5/EF5) in an outbreak ===
Outbreaks with fifteen or more F4/EF4 and F5/EF5 tornadoes
Outbreak	Year	Country	F4/EF4	F5/EF5	Total	Deaths
1974 Super Outbreak	1974	US, CAN	23	7	30	319
1965 Palm Sunday tornado outbreak	1965	US	18	0	18	271
May–June 1917 tornado outbreak sequence	1917	US	14	1	15	383
2011 Super Outbreak	2011	US, CAN	11	4	15	324

=== Longest continuous outbreak and largest autumnal outbreak ===
Most tornado outbreaks in North America occur in the spring, but there is a secondary peak of tornado activity in the fall. It is historically less consistent from year to year but can include exceptionally large or intense outbreaks. In 1992, an estimated 95 tornadoes broke out in a record 41 hours of continuous tornado activity from November 21 to 23. This is also among the largest-known outbreaks in areal expanse. Many other very large outbreaks have occurred in autumn, especially in October and November, such as the 2002 Veterans Day weekend outbreak, in which 83 tornadoes occurred from November 9 to 11, and November 17, 2013, when 73 tornadoes were produced in 11 hours.

=== Greatest number of tornadoes spawned from a hurricane ===
The greatest number of tornadoes spawned from a hurricane is 120 from Hurricane Ivan in September 2004, followed by Hurricane Beulah with 115 in September 1967, and 103 from Hurricane Frances in September 2004 (a couple weeks before Ivan). Hurricanes prior to the 1990s, when tornado records were more sparse, perhaps produced more tornadoes than were officially documented.

== Tornadoes annually and monthly ==
=== Most tornadoes for each calendar month ===
Highest confirmed number of tornadoes by month in United States
Month	January	February	March	April	May	June	July	August	September	October	November	December
Year	1999	2008	2025	2011	2024	1992	1993	2020	2004	2021	1992	2021
Total	216	147	236	780	545 (Note: While the 2024 tornado season has had more May tornado reports with 571, that total is considered preliminary until finalized figures are released.)	399	242	182	297	150	161	227

Largest continuous tornado outbreak by month
Month	Event	Tornadoes
January	Tornado outbreak of January 21–23, 1999	128
February	2008 Super Tuesday tornado outbreak	87
March	Tornado outbreak of March 13–16, 2025 (Note: Although the tornado outbreak of March 31 – April 1, 2023 had 146 tornadoes in total, only 115 occurred on March 31.)	118
April	2011 Super Outbreak	367
May	Tornado outbreak sequence of May 2004	389
June	Tornado outbreak of June 14–18, 1992	170
July	Severe weather sequence of July 13–16, 2024	94
August	Hurricane Katrina tornado outbreak	57
September	Hurricane Ivan tornado outbreak	120
October	October 2010 North American storm complex	69
November	Tornado outbreak of November 22–24, 2004 1981 United Kingdom tornado outbreak	104
December	December 2021 Midwest derecho and tornado outbreak	120

=== Most tornadoes in a single year ===
On average, 1,200 tornadoes happen in a year in the United States. The most confirmed tornadoes in a single year was in 2004, which had 1817 confirmed tornadoes. This was mostly boosted by a large tornado outbreak sequence in May 2004, where 509 tornadoes occurred. It also had help from a very active fall and winter tornado season.

== Tornado casualties and damage ==
=== Deadliest single tornado in world history ===
Officially, the deadliest single tornado occurred on April 26, 1989, in Bangladesh, where a large tornado took at least 1,300 lives. In 2022, this tornado's death toll was challenged in a database of Bangladeshi tornadoes maintained by Dr. Fahim Sufi with the Australian Government, claiming that the April 14, 1969, Dhaka tornado, which killed 922 people, was the deadliest in Bangladesh, with the Jamalpur tornado killing only 570.

=== Deadliest single tornado in US history ===
The Tri-State tornado of March 18, 1925, killed 695 people in Missouri (11), Illinois (613), and Indiana (71). The outbreak it occurred with was also the deadliest known tornado outbreak, with a combined death toll of 747 across the Mississippi River Valley.

=== Most intense tornado damage ===
The original Fujita scale, developed by Ted Fujita, has never been used to assign a final rating over F5 intensity; (Note: The Fujita scale historically only ever assigned final ratings from F0 through F5, however, did account for ratings up to F12. Ratings above F6 were never seriously considered.) however, two tornadoes, the 1970 Lubbock tornado and 1974 Xenia tornado, were initially given F6 ratings by Fujita himself, but both were eventually downgraded to F5 ratings. The 1976 Jordan tornado was described by Fujita as the most intense tornado damage he had surveyed up to that point.

A more recent example of extreme damage was at the Double Creek Estates of Jarrell, Texas; the 1997 Jarrell tornado stalled over the area at peak F5 intensity, destroying every home in the subdivision, and killing 27. Extreme ground scouring and high-end F5 damage was surveyed. The 2008 Parkersburg tornado was reported by mayor Bob Haylock to have been so intense that a majority of the fatalities out of Parkersburg were from people taking shelter in basements underground. The 2011 Philadelphia, Mississippi tornado caused extreme ground scouring across its path; up to .5 m (1.6 ft) of soil was removed from the environment, presumably from intense subvortices.

=== Most damaging tornado ===
The 1896 St. Louis–East St. Louis tornado on May 27, incurred the most damages adjusted for inflation, with an estimated $5.36 billion (2022 USD). In raw numbers, the Joplin tornado of May 22, 2011, is considered the costliest tornado in recent history, with damage totals at $3.71 billion (2022 USD). Until April 2011, the Bridge Creek–Moore tornado of May 3, 1999, was the most costly, which was later surpassed by the 2011 Tuscaloosa–Birmingham tornado, with a damage total of $3.18 billion (2022 USD).

== Largest and most powerful tornadoes ==
=== Highest winds observed in a tornado ===
Wind speed of 261 mph (420 km/h) or 116 m/s in tornadoes observed by radar, organized by the highest confirmed wind speed.
Official rating	Date	Location	Minimum peak wind speed	Maximum peak wind speed	Highest confirmed peak wind speed
F5	May 3, 1999	Bridge Creek, Oklahoma	281 mph (452 km/h)	321 mph (517 km/h)	321 mph (517 km/h) (Note: The exact statement, released in June 2024, from the University of Illinois’ Doppler on Wheels team regarding this wind speed is: “Wurman et al. 2007 originally reported 302 mph in the Bridgecreek, Oklahoma, 3 May 1999 tornado. This was subsequently revised upwards in Wurman et al. 2021, to 321 mph, using improved techniques.”)
In 2007, Joshua Wurman along with other researchers, published that a Doppler on Wheels recorded 135 m/s (300 mph; 490 km/h) approximately 32 metres (105 ft) above the radar level. In 2021, Wurman along with other researchers, revised the data using improved techniques and published that the Doppler on Wheels actually recorded 321 miles per hour (517 km/h) in the tornado.
EF3	May 31, 2013	El Reno, Oklahoma	296 mph (476 km/h)	336 mph (541 km/h)	313 mph (504 km/h)
A Doppler on Wheels recorded winds between 257–336 mph (414–541 km/h) at or less than 100 metres (330 ft) above the radar level in a suction vortex inside the tornado. This was later revised by the Doppler on Wheels team to 291–336 mph (468–541 km/h). In 2015, Howard Bluestein, along with other researchers, reported that the radar did capture at least a moment of winds of 313 miles per hour (504 km/h). This tornado is notable for causing the death of 3 team TWISTEX researchers and was the first tornado recorded to kill storm chasers.
EF4	May 21, 2024	Greenfield, Iowa	309 mph (497 km/h)	318 mph (512 km/h)	≥309 mph (497 km/h) (Note: In the 2024 university of Illinois publication, no exact windspeed was specified, only a range between 309 and 318. Therefore, the highest windspeed that can be confirmed is the minimum of the range.)
A Doppler on Wheels recorded winds of 263–271 mph (423–436 km/h) approximately 30–50 m (98–164 ft) above the radar level. Following calculations to more accurately determine peak wind speeds, it was published that ground-relative winds of 309–318 mph (497–512 km/h) could be observed briefly to the immediate east of the main circulation.
EF5	May 24, 2011	Hinton, Oklahoma	289 mph (465 km/h)	296 mph (476 km/h)	295.5 mph (475.6 km/h)
RaXPol recorded a wind gust of 124.8 m/s (279 mph; 449 km/h) about 200–230 feet (60–70 m) above the radar level. However, this data was later revised to be 132.1 m/s (295 mph; 476 km/h) at 72 ft (22 m) above the radar level.
F4	April 26, 1991	Red Rock, Oklahoma	268 mph (431 km/h)	286 mph (460 km/h)	286 mph (460 km/h)
A University of Oklahoma chase team headed by Howard Bluestein utilized mobile doppler weather radar to analyze the tornado. The radar measured peak winds of 120–125 m/s (270–280 mph; 430–450 km/h) between 150–190 m (490–620 ft) above the surface. According to the Oklahoma Mesonet, winds possibly reached as high as 286 mph (460 km/h). At the time, this represented the strongest winds ever measured by radar, including the first measurements of F5 intensity winds.
F4	May 30, 1998	Spencer, South Dakota	234 mph (377 km/h)	266 mph (428 km/h)	264 mph (425 km/h)
A Doppler on Wheels recorded winds of 264 mph (425 km/h) "well below" 50 metres (160 ft) above the ground level, "perhaps as low as 5–10 metres (16–33 ft) above the radar level". The Doppler on Wheels also recorded a confirmed five-second wind speed average of 112 m/s (250 mph; 400 km/h).
EF3	May 28, 2013	Bennington, Kansas	—N/a	—N/a	264 mph (425 km/h)
A Doppler on Wheels recorded winds of 264 mph (425 km/h) approximately 153 ft (47 m) above the ground level.
F4	May 3, 1999	Mulhall, Oklahoma	246 mph (396 km/h)	299 mph (481 km/h)	257 mph (414 km/h)
A Doppler on Wheels documented the largest-ever-observed core flow circulation with a distance of 1,600 m (5,200 ft) between peak velocities on either side of the tornado, and a roughly 7 km (4.3 mi) width of peak wind gusts exceeding 43 m/s (96 mph), making the Mulhall tornado the largest tornado ever measured quantitatively. The DOW measured a complex multi-vortex structure, with several vortices containing winds of up to 115 m/s (260 mph) rotating around the tornado. The 3D structure of the tornado has been analyzed in a 2005 article in the Journal of the Atmospheric Sciences by Wen-Chau Lee and Joshua Wurman. In 2024, it was published that the radar did measure winds of approximately 257 mph (414 km/h) approximately 30 m (98 ft) above the radar level.

During the F5 1999 Bridge Creek–Moore tornado on May 3, 1999, in the southern Oklahoma City metro area, a Doppler on Wheels situated near the tornado measured winds of 301 ± 20 mph (484 ± 32 km/h) momentarily in a small area inside the funnel approximately 100 m (330 ft) above ground level. The measured winds in this tornado have been updated to 321 miles per hour (517 km/h).

On May 31, 2013, a tornado hit rural areas near El Reno, Oklahoma. The tornado was originally rated as an EF3 based on damage; however, after mobile radar data analysis was conducted, it was concluded to have been an EF5 due to a measured wind speed of greater than 296 mph (476 km/h), second only to the Bridge Creek–Moore tornado. Revised RaXPol analysis found winds of 302 ± 34 mph (486 ± 55 km/h) well above ground level and ≥291 mph (468 km/h) below 10 m (33 ft) with some subvortices moving at 175 mph (282 km/h). These winds may possibly be as high or higher than the winds recorded on May 3, 1999. Despite the recorded windspeed, the El Reno tornado was later downgraded back to EF3 due to the fact that no EF5 damage was found, likely due to the lack of sufficient damage indicators in the largely-rural area west of Oklahoma City.

During the Greenfield, Iowa EF4 on May 21, 2024, Doppler on Wheels recorded wind speeds of 263–271 mph (423–436 km/h) in a very small swath inside the funnel approximately 100–106 ft (30–32 m) above radar level as the tornado went through town. After doing some mathematical and physics-based calculations, the researchers determined those measured winds were equivalent to 309–318 mph (497–512 km/h). The calculated minimum wind threshold as stated beats both the 1999 Bridge Creek–Moore tornado and the 2013 El Reno, Oklahoma tornado for minimum possible maximum windspeed; however, the highest confirmed peak windspeeds are lower than the 1999 tornado.

Winds were measured at 262–280 mph (422–451 km/h) using portable Doppler weather radar in the Red Rock, Oklahoma, tornado during the April 26, 1991, tornado outbreak in north-central Oklahoma. Though these winds are possibly indicative of F5 intensity, this particular tornado's path never encountered any significant structures and caused minimal damage, so it was rated F4.

Wind speed of 300 mph (130 m/s) or above estimated in tornadoes, organized chronologically.
Accepted rating	Date	Location	Low end peak wind estimate	High end peak wind estimate	Method	Estimating researcher / organization	Ref
T11	June 29, 1764	Woldegk, Mecklenburg-Strelitz, Holy Roman Empire (now Germany)	300 mph (480 km/h)	—N/a	Damage survey	ESSL	
F5	March 18, 1925	Missouri, Illinois, and Indiana, United States	—N/a	>300 mph (480 km/h)	Damage survey	NWS	
F4	July 20, 1931	Lublin, Poland	246 mph (396 km/h)	336 mph (541 km/h)	Dynamic pressure	Gumulski	
F5	May 15, 1968	Charles City, Iowa, United States	200 mph (320 km/h)	300 mph (480 km/h)	Damage survey	NWS	
F5	April 3, 1974	Guin, Alabama, United States	—N/a	285 mph (459 km/h)	Acoustic analysis	University of Mississippi	
F5	April 3, 1974	Xenia, Ohio, United States	250 mph (400 km/h)	305 mph (491 km/h)	Academic analysis	Fujita	
F5	March 13, 1990	Goessel, Kansas, United States	300 mph (480 km/h)	350 mph (560 km/h)	Academic analysis	Fujita, Grazulis	
F4	June 8, 1995	Pampa, Texas, United States	300 mph (480 km/h)	>318 mph (512 km/h)	Photogrammetry	Grazulis	

While never observed, these tornadoes are believed to have had winds of 300 miles per hour (480 km/h) or above, which would make them among the strongest tornadoes in history. There is a questionable analysis of the 1917 Mattoon/Charleston tornado (Note: The paper states that the storm was a single tornado; later analysis suggests it was most likely a tornado family that traveled 287 miles across Missouri and Illinois.) published in the Geographical Review in 1917 that stated the tornado had strong "inflowing wind, which probably exceeded 400 mph (640 km/h)". A 1968 Weather Bureau review of the 1968 Hansell-Charles City tornado found intense ground scouring, and initial estimates for wind speeds reached 528 mph (850 km/h); these figures were revised down to 200–300 mph (320–480 km/h).

=== Longest damage path and duration ===
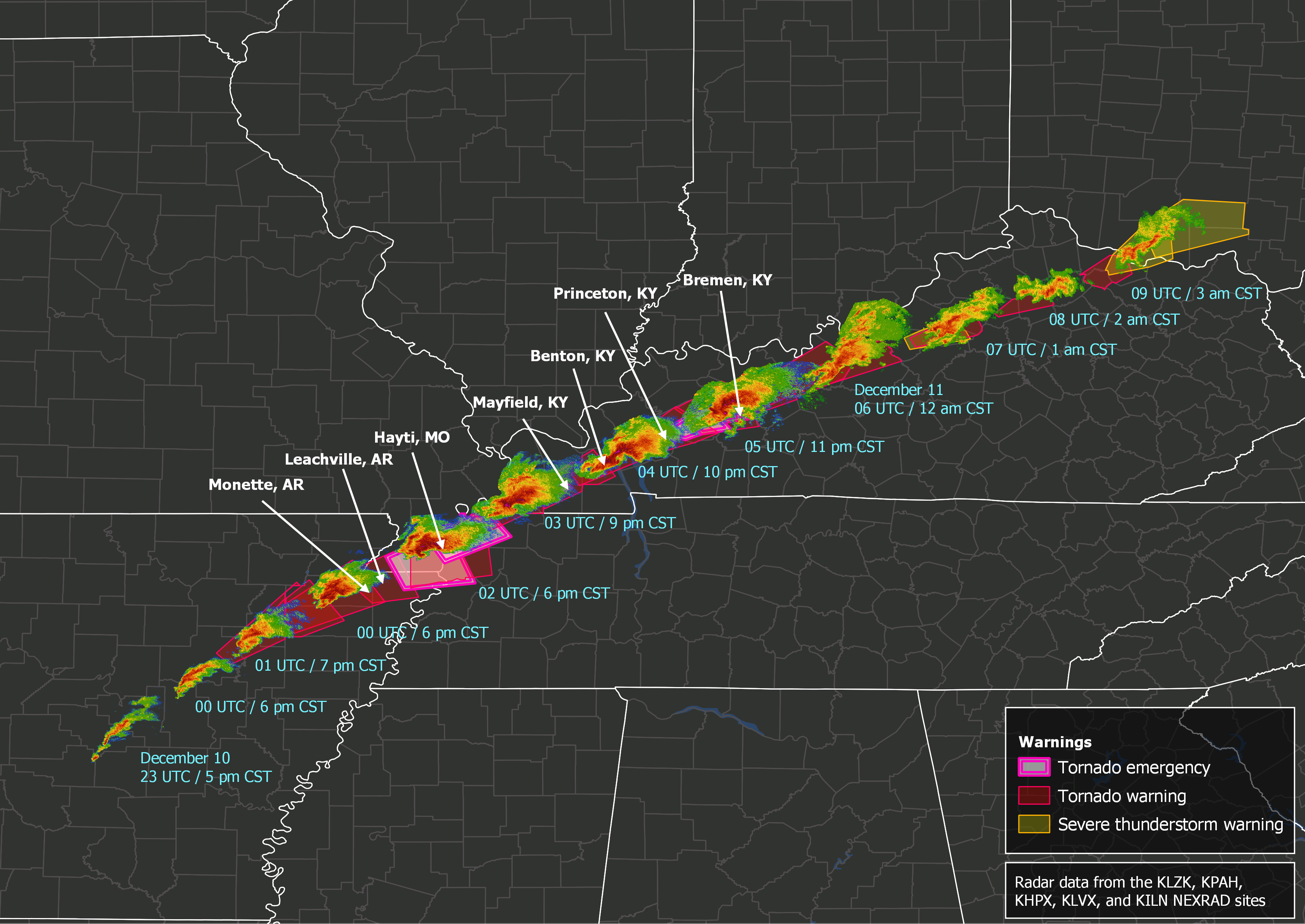
Radar collage of the supercell that spawned the record-breaking tornado family on December 10–11, 2021

The longest-known track for a single tornado is the Tri-State tornado, occurring on March 18, 1925, with a path length of 151 to 235 mi (243 to 378 km). For years there was debate whether the originally-recognized path length of 219 mi (352 km) over 3.5 hours was from one tornado or a series. Some very long track (VLT) tornadoes were later determined to be successive tornadoes spawned by the same supercell thunderstorm, which are known as a tornado family. The Tri-State tornado, however, appeared to have no gaps in the damage. A six-year reanalysis study by a team of severe convective storm meteorologists found insufficient evidence to make firm conclusions but does conclude that it is likely that the beginning and ending of the path was resultant of separate tornadoes comprising a tornado family. It also found that the tornado began 15 mi (24 km) to the west and ended 1 mi (1.6 km) farther east than previously known, bringing the total path to 235 mi (378 km). The 174 mi (280 km) segment from central Madison County, Missouri, to Pike County, Indiana, is likely one continuous tornado, and the 151 mi (243 km) segment from central Bollinger County, Missouri, to western Pike County, Indiana, is very likely a single continuous tornado. Another significant tornado was found about 65 mi (105 km) east-northeast of the end of aforementioned segment(s) of the Tri-State tornado family and is likely another member of the family. Its path length of 20 mi (32 km) over about 20 minutes makes the known tornado family path length total to 320 mi (510 km) over about 5 1/2 hours. Grazulis in 2001 wrote that the first 60 mi (97 km) of the (originally recognized) track is probably the result of two or more tornadoes and that a path length of 157 mi (253 km) was seemingly continuous.

The 2021 Western Kentucky tornado on December 10, 2021, is the longest confirmed track of a tornado. This violent tornado tracked 165.7 mi (266.7 km) through the states of Tennessee and Kentucky during a very intense late-season outbreak. The tornado was spawned by a very long-tracked supercell that previously dropped another violent tornado in Arkansas, Missouri and Tennessee, and initial media reports referred to the entire event as the "Quad-state Tornado", which would have had a path of 230 mi (370 km).

On March 22, 1953, a tornado touched down near Leesville, Louisiana at 21:00 UTC; the tornado continued into far-northwest Mississippi, before dissipating north of Leland, killing two and injuring 22. The tornado was rated F2 on the Fujita scale. It traveled for 234.7 mi (377.7 km), making it possibly the longest tracked tornado in history, though it is likely that the path consisted of multiple different tornadoes as part of a tornado family.

=== Longest path and duration tornado family ===
What at one time was thought to be the record holder for the longest tornado path is now thought to be the longest tornado family, with a track of at least 293 miles (472 km) on May 26, 1917, from the Missouri border across Illinois into Indiana. It caused severe damage and mass casualties in Charleston and Mattoon, Illinois.

What was probably the longest track supercell thunderstorm tracked 790 miles (1,270 km) across 6 states in 17.5 hours on March 12, 2006, as part of the March 2006 tornado outbreak sequence. It began in Noble County, Oklahoma, and ended in Jackson County, Michigan, producing many tornadoes in Missouri and Illinois.

=== Largest path width ===
Officially, the widest tornado on record is the El Reno, Oklahoma tornado of May 31, 2013, with a width of 2.6 miles (4.2 km) at its peak. This is the width found by the National Weather Service based on preliminary data from University of Oklahoma RaXPol mobile radar that also sampled winds of 296 mph (476 km/h), which was used to upgrade the tornado to EF5. However, it was revealed that these winds did not impact any structures, and as a result the tornado was downgraded to EF3 based on damage.

The F4 Hallam, Nebraska, tornado during the outbreak of May 22, 2004, was the previous official record holder for the widest tornado, surveyed at 2.5 miles (4.0 km) wide. A similar size tornado struck Edmonson, Texas on May 31, 1968, when a damage path width between 2 and 3 miles (3.2 and 4.8 km) was recorded from an F3 tornado. Another tornado with a similar width struck Maxton and Red Springs during the March 28, 1984, Carolina Tornado Outbreak; this tornado had a width of 2.5 miles wide at one point. Rated as F4, the tornado resulted in 3 fatalities and 280 injuries. The EF4 Jiangsu tornado on June 23, 2016, also had a peak width of 4.1 km wide (2.55 miles).

On May 3, 1999, a Doppler On Wheels (DOW) mobile radar observed an F4 tornado as it crossed Mulhall during the 1999 Oklahoma Tornado Outbreak, which also produced the Bridge Creek–Moore tornado. The DOW documented the largest-ever-observed core flow circulation with a distance of 1,600 m (5,200 ft) between peak velocities on either side of the tornado, and a roughly 7 km (4.3 mi) width of peak wind gusts exceeding 43 m/s (96 mph), making the Mulhall tornado the largest tornado ever measured quantitatively.

On April 21, 1946, a tornado struck the area in and around Timber Lake, South Dakota. The U.S. Weather Bureau published a paper in 1946 stating the width of this tornado was 4 miles (6.4 km), which would make this the widest tornado ever documented in history. However, this is outside the period of reliable documentation accepted by the National Weather Service, which is 1950–present.

On May 19, 2024, a large multiple-vortex tornado tracked 15 mi (24 km) over rural areas near Custer City, Oklahoma. While the tornado is believed to only have been about 1 mile wide, the maximum width of its tornadic windfield and accompanying damage was nearly 3 mi (4.8 km), making it one of the largest recorded damage paths of any tornado.

=== Smallest and shortest-lived damaging tornado ===
The smallest and shortest-lived tornado on record to produce surveyable damage was an EF1 tornado on the western side of Broken Bow, Nebraska on July 16, 2024. Spawned from an outflow-driven supercell, a very brief tornado, seen by a chaser and a surveillance camera, was recorded on the ground for only two seconds, having a listed maximum width of only 1 yard (0.91 m) and a listed path length of 0.01 miles (16 m). Despite this, it was powerful enough to lift and throw an 800 lb (360 kg) trailer into a nearby parked car.

=== Highest forward speed ===
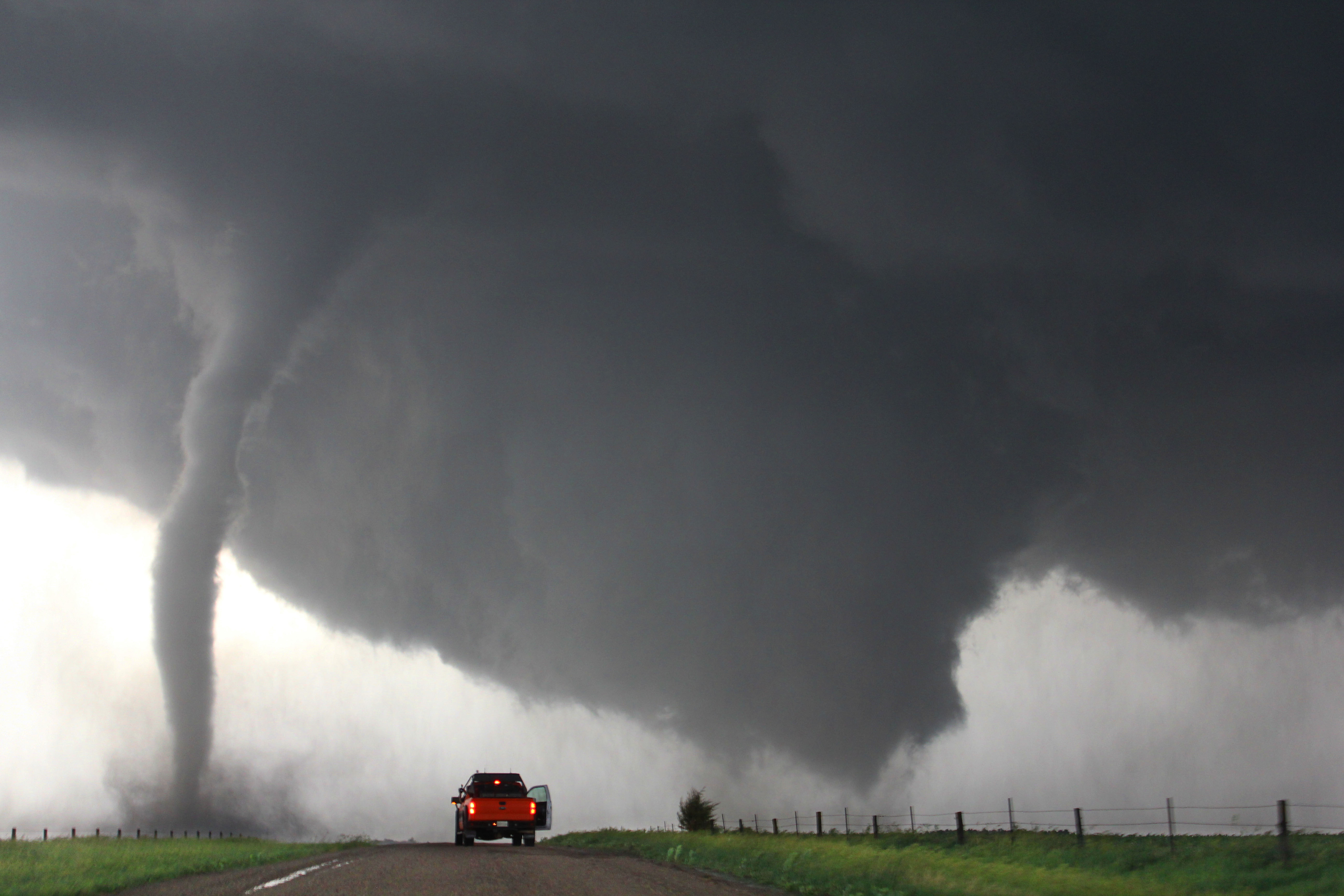
Twin EF4 tornadoes in Pilger, Nebraska on June 16, 2014. The leftmost tornado would achieve the highest forward speed in history.

The highest accepted forward speed of an intense tornado on record was 75 mph (121 km/h) from the 1974 Guin tornado that tore across northwestern Alabama. Other weak tornadoes have approached or exceeded this speed, but this is the fastest forward movement observed in a major tornado. The 1977 Birmingham tornado had an average forward speed of 60 mph (97 km/h), as did the 2021 Western Kentucky tornado.

Weaker tornadoes and tornado vortices have been recorded exceeding these speeds. Subvortices of the 2013 El Reno tornado were recorded to travel at speeds of 175 mph (282 km/h) as they orbited the main vortex; the fastest speed a separate tornado-producing mesocyclone has been recorded to travel at was determined via photogrammetry to be the junior EF4 of the 2014 Pilger, Nebraska, tornado family, travelling at 94.6 mph (152.2 km/h) for five seconds near the very end of its lifespan. These figures have not been acknowledged by the National Weather Service.

Calculations of highest speeds from the National Centers for Environmental Information Storm Events Database gives a high average forward speed of a significant tornado just west of Galt, Iowa, on December 15, 2021, of between 70.91 mph (114.12 km/h) and 88.65 mph (142.67 km/h). This tornado occurred during the December 2021 Midwest derecho and tornado outbreak, and was accompanied by straight-line winds approaching 80 mph (130 km/h). A faster range can be calculated on an EF1 tornado south of Taylorville, Illinois on March 31, 2023, which traveled 1.74 mi (2.80 km) between 18:13 and 18:14, giving a range of forward speeds between 52.2 mph (84.0 km/h) and 104.4 mph (168.0 km/h). Due to significant variability caused by the unspecific nature of the timestamps provided, these speed figures are unofficial.

=== Greatest pressure drop ===
A pressure deficit of 100 millibars (2.95 inHg) was observed during a violent tornado near Manchester, South Dakota on June 24, 2003, passed directly over an in-situ probe deployed by storm chasing researcher Tim Samaras. In less than a minute, the pressure plunged to 850 millibars (25.10 inHg) at ground level, widely regarded as the lowest reliably measured pressure inside a tornado and, when adjusted to sea level, comparable to the lowest pressures ever recorded in the United States.

On April 21, 2007, a 194-millibar (5.73 inHg) pressure deficit was reported when a tornado struck a storm chasing vehicle in Tulia, Texas. The tornado caused EF2 damage as it passed through Tulia. The reported pressure drop far exceeds that which would be expected based on theoretical calculations.

There is a questionable and unofficial citizen's barometer measurement of a 192-millibar (5.67 inHg) drop around Minneapolis in 1904.

== Early tornadoes ==
=== Earliest-known tornado in Europe ===
- The earliest recorded tornado in Europe struck Freising (Germany) in 788.
- The earliest-known Irish tornado appeared on April 30, 1054, in Rostella, near Kilbeggan. The earliest-known British tornado hit central London on October 23, 1091, and was especially destructive.

=== Earliest-known tornado in the Americas ===
- An apparent tornado is recorded to have struck Tlatelolco (present day Mexico City), on August 21, 1521, two days before the Aztec capital's fall to Cortés. Many other tornadoes are documented historically within the Basin of Mexico.

==== First confirmed tornado and first tornado fatality in present-day United States ====
- August 1671 – Rehoboth, Massachusetts
- July 8, 1680 – Cambridge, Massachusetts – 1 death

=== Earliest-known tornado in Asia ===
- A tornado was observed in Kaifeng Prefecture during the summer of AD 967.
- An apparent tornado caused severe damage in Heian-kyō in modern-day Kyoto on 1 June 1180, (Note: Gregorian calendar date. 25 May in the Julian calendar, and the 29th day of the fourth month, Jishō 4 in the old Japanese calendar.) which was recorded by Japanese author Kamo no Chōmei, who personally experienced the tornado.
- The earliest recorded tornado in continental Asia struck near the city of Calcutta in present-day West Bengal, India, in 1838. It was described as moving remarkably slow across its 16-mile (26 km) path southeast over the span of 2 to 3 hours. It was recorded to cause significant damage to the area, including 3.5-pound (1.6 kg) hail being observed at the Dum Dum weather observatory.

=== First published scientific studies of a tornado ===
A few scientists in Europe, the US, and elsewhere documented the occurrence of tornadoes in the late 18th and early-mid 19th centuries to try to discern patterns of distribution and sometimes with inferences about formative processes and dynamics.

For intensive studies of tornadoes, these are the earliest known publications:

- 1765: German scientist Gottlob Burchard Genzmer published a detailed survey of the damage path of an extremely violent tornado which occurred near Woldegk, Germany, on 29 June 1764. It covers the entire 33 km (18.6 mi) long track and also includes eyewitness reports as well as an analysis of the debris and hail fallout areas. Genzmer calls the event an "Orcan" and only compares it to waterspouts or dust devils. Based on the damage survey, modern day meteorologists from the ESSL gave an roughly estimated rating of F5.
- 1839–41: A detailed survey of the damage path of the significant tornado that struck New Brunswick, New Jersey, on 19 June 1835, was published. This tornado is also considered the deadliest tornado in New Jersey history. The path was surveyed by many scientists on account of its location between New York City and Philadelphia, including early tornado theorists James Pollard Espy and William Charles Redfield. Scientists disagreed whether there was whirling, convergent, or rotational motion. A conclusion that remains accurate today is that the most intense damage tends to be on the right side of a tornado (with respect to direction of forward movement), which was found to be generally easterly.
- 1840: The earliest known intensive study of a tornadic event published in Europe, by French scientist Athanase Peltier.
- 1865: The first in India and earliest known scientific survey of a tornado that analyzed structure and dynamics was published in 1865 by Indian scientist Chunder Sikur Chatterjee. The path damage survey of a tornado that occurred at Pundooah (now Pandua), Hugli district, West Bengal, India, was documented on maps and revealed multiple vortices, the tornadocyclone, and direction of rotation, predating work by John Park Finley, Alfred Wegener, Johannes Letzmann, and Ted Fujita.

== Exceptional tornado droughts ==
=== Longest span without a tornado rated F5/EF5 in the United States ===
Spans without an official F5/EF5 of more than 3.5 years
Length in Years	Length in Days	Start of drought	End of drought
3.921	1,431	May 5, 1960	April 3, 1964
4.090	1,493	June 16, 1992	July 18, 1996
4.786	1,747	May 31, 1985	March 13, 1990
4.995	1,824	April 4, 1977	April 2, 1982
8.005	2,922	May 3, 1999	May 4, 2007
12.093	4,414	May 20, 2013	June 20, 2025

Before the Greensburg EF5 tornado on May 4, 2007, it had been eight years and two days since the United States had a confirmed F5/EF5 tornado, with the previous one being an F5 tornado that hit the southern Oklahoma City metro area and surrounding communities on May 3, 1999. This stretch was later surpassed by a drought which began on May 20, 2013 and ended on June 20, 2025, with a tornado that struck near Enderlin, North Dakota. (Note: The Enderlin tornado was originally rated EF3; the National Weather Service and structural engineers conducted additional surveys of the damage path, where they found wind speeds over 210 miles per hour (340 km/h) as a result of flipped and tossed train cars, leading to an upgrade to EF5 that was announced on October 6.)

=== Years without tornado rated violent (F4/EF4+) in United States ===
2018 was the only year since official records began in 1950 that no tornado in the United States was rated in the violent class (F4/EF4+). Worldwide, however, there were two violent tornadoes- one in Brazil and one in Canada.

== Exceptional survivors ==
=== Longest distance carried by a tornado ===
Matt Suter of Fordland, Missouri holds the record for the longest-known distance traveled by anyone picked up by a tornado who survived the ordeal. On March 12, 2006, he was carried 1,307 feet (398 m), 13 feet (4.0 m) shy of one quarter-mile (402 m), according to National Weather Service measurements.

While not officially reported as the longest distance, both the National Weather Service and tornado expert Thomas P. Grazulis document that the 1976 Brownwood, Texas, F5 tornado picked up and threw two teenagers 1,000 yards (910 m), with both surviving.

== Exceptional coincidences ==
=== Arabi, Louisiana ===
On March 22, 2022, an EF3 tornado struck Arabi, Louisiana, a census-designated place in the New Orleans metropolitan area. On December 14 of that year, another tornado, rated EF2, affected many of the same areas, with the two tornado tracks overlapping in parts of Terrytown and Arabi.

=== Barnsley, Kentucky ===
The unincorporated community of Barnsley, Kentucky was hit twice by intense tornadoes less than three years apart from each other.

The violent 2021 Western Kentucky tornado hit the community, destroying numerous homes, and in 2024, the city was struck again by an EF3 tornado that impacted many of the same areas. Certain areas in Barnsley were affected by both tornadoes.

=== Chaffee, Kelso and Illmo, Missouri ===
On April 30, 1940, two separate tornadoes, less than two hours apart, struck the communities of Chaffee, Kelso and Illmo, Missouri. Thomas P. Grazulis rated both tornadoes F2 on the Fujita scale and both tornadoes killed one person near Kelso.

=== Chicago, Illinois ===
Chicago is the largest city in the state of Illinois and the third most populated in the United States, and had only seen six tornadoes between 1954 and 2023. However, on July 14 and 15, 2024, back-to-back outbreaks of weak (EF0 and EF1) tornadoes produced six within the city limits in a span of under 48 hours. The July 15 event, prompted by a derecho, spawned 32 tornadoes in the National Weather Service Chicago, Illinois area of responsibility, tying the one-year record of 32 in a single day. The forecast area typically only sees 15 tornadoes per year.

=== Codell, Kansas ===
The small town of Codell, Kansas, was hit by a tornado on the same date (May 20) three consecutive years: 1916, 1917, and 1918. The United States has about 100,000 thunderstorms per year; less than 1% produce a tornado. The odds of this coincidence occurring again are extremely small.

=== Dolores, Uruguay ===
The small town of Dolores, Uruguay, has been hit multiple times by intense tornadoes.

On November 25, 1985, the city was hit by an intense tornado rated as an F3. On December 8, 2012, 27 years later, another intense tornado occurred in the outskirts of the city. On April 15, 2016, an EF3 tornado destroyed large portions of the city.

=== La Plata, Maryland ===
La Plata is a town in Charles County, Maryland, located well outside the climatologically favored area for tornadoes, let alone violent ones. Despite that, it has been struck several times.

On November 9, 1926, it was struck by a high-end F3 to F4 tornado that killed 13 school children, 4 townspeople, and injured some 65 others.

67 years later on July 27, 1994, it was struck again by two nonfatal tornadoes that came only 11 minutes apart. The first of them was rated F2, which is already uncommon for that greater area.

On April 28, 2002, La Plata was struck by another violent and extremely fast-moving F4 tornado that initially received a preliminary rating of F5, making it, for a brief period, the easternmost F5 tornado in the United States. Not only that, but shortly before the F4 passed through downtown La Plata, eyewitness accounts indicated that a second F2 tornado formed a quarter of a mile south of the primary one. Between 7:02 and 7:07 p.m., both tornadoes crossed through the heart of La Plata, devastating the town.

The most recent tornado to have struck the town was an EF1 on February 25th, 2017.

=== Moore, Oklahoma ===
The southern Oklahoma City suburb of Moore, Oklahoma, was hit by violent tornadoes (which have ratings of at least F/EF4) in 1999, 2003, 2010, and 2013. The 1999 and 2013 events were rated F5 and EF5, respectively.

In total, about 25 tornadoes have struck within the immediate vicinity of Moore since 1890, the most recent of which was an EF3 tornado occurring during the overnight hours of November 3, 2024. It injured six in northeastern Moore before lifting less than 2 miles away from Tinker Air Force Base.

=== Shreveport, Louisiana ===
A lesser-known hotspot for tornadic activity is Shreveport and its neighbouring town, Bossier City, Louisiana.

Downtown Shreveport has been hit multiple times by powerful tornadoes, including once in February 1912 (rated F3), April 1964 (rated F3), April 1978 (rated F2), December 1978 (rated F4), April 2000 (rated F1), April 2009 (rated EF2), October 2009 (rated EF2), and April 2018 (rated EF1).

=== 1974 Super Outbreak ===
Ted Fujita documented that five cities had been hit by more than one tornado during the Super Outbreak: Etowah, Tennessee, Livingston, Tennessee, Cleveland, Tennessee, Tanner, Alabama, and Harvest, Alabama.

=== Tanner/Harvest, Alabama ===
Tanner, a small town in northern Alabama, was hit by an F5 tornado on April 3, 1974 and was struck again 45 minutes later by a second F5 (however, the rating is disputed and it may have been high-end F4), demolishing what remained of the town.

Thirty-seven years later, on April 27, 2011 (the largest and deadliest outbreak since 1974), Tanner was hit yet again by the EF5 2011 Hackleburg–Phil Campbell tornado, which produced high-end EF4 damage in the southern portion of town.

The suburban community of Harvest, Alabama, just to the northeast, also sustained major impacts from all three Tanner tornadoes, and was also hit by destructive tornadoes in 1995 and 2012.

=== Tinker Air Force Base, OK ===
On March 20, 1948, an unpredicted line of storms hit the area, producing an F3 tornado that hit areas of south Oklahoma City, hitting Tinker Air Force Base at the end of its life, damaging many aircraft. This caused a 3-day investigation at the base on why it was so poorly forecasted.

On March 25, meteorologists noted that conditions were very similar to March 20 and issued a forecast for thunderstorms. As the day wore on and conditions became more favorable (with a developing squall line detected on radar), meteorologists Ernest J. Fawbush and Robert C. Miller issued the first ever official tornado forecast. That night, another F3 tornado struck the base, though was less damaging thanks to the advance warning. This was the first successful tornado forecast in history, even though much of it was due to chance.

== See also ==
- Weather records
- List of tropical cyclone extremes
- Tornado myths
- List of F5, EF5, and IF5 tornadoes
- List of F4, EF4, and IF4 tornadoes
- List of tornadoes and tornado outbreaks
  - List of tornado outbreaks by outbreak intensity score
- List of tornadoes with confirmed satellite tornadoes
