= Leota Township, Nobles County, Minnesota =

Leota Township, Minnesota
- Township
- Location within the state of Minnesota Leota Township, Minnesota (the United States)
- Coordinates: 43°48′35″N 95°59′31″W
- Country: United States
- State: Minnesota
- County: Nobles

Area
  - Total: 36.2 sq mi (93.7 km^{2})
  - Land: 36.2 sq mi (93.7 km^{2})
  - Water: 0 sq mi (0.0 km^{2})
- Elevation: 1,600 ft (500 m)

Population (2000)
  - Total: 463
  - Density: 13/sq mi (4.9/km^{2})
- Time zone: UTC-6 (Central (CST))
  - Summer (DST): UTC-5 (CDT)
- ZIP code: 56153
- Area code: 507
- FIPS code: 27-36566
- GNIS feature ID: 0664759

Leota Township is a township in Nobles County, Minnesota, United States. The population was 463 at the 2000 census. Within the township is the CDP of Leota.

== Geography ==
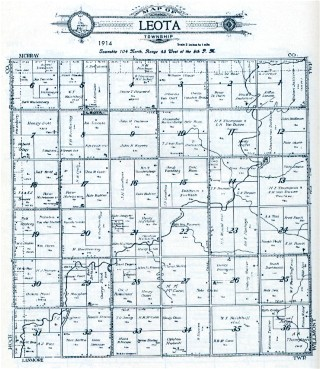
Map of Leota Township - 1914

Homestead of Martin Kallemeyen, first Dutch settler in Leota Township

According to the United States Census Bureau, the township has a total area of 36.2 square miles (93.7 km^{2}), all land. The main geographic feature in Leota Townships is the Champepadan Creek.

Main highways include:

- Minnesota State Highway 91
- Nobles County Road 16
- Nobles County Road 19
- Nobles County Road 20

== History ==
Leota Township was first settled by Dutch farmers who migrated northward from another Dutch Settlement in Orange City, Iowa. Organization of Leota Township was approved by the Nobles County Board on March 18, 1879. The first township meeting was held on April 5, 1879. The story has it that Leota was the name of a young Indian woman who figured in a romantic story familiar to W. G. Barnard, one of the township's first residents. However existence of such a story cannot be verified. If true, Leota Township (and the village of Leota) are the only place names in all of Nobles County that memorialize specific Native Americans.

== Demographics ==
As of the census of 2000, there were 463 people, 191 households, and 147 families residing in the township. The population density was 12.8 inhabitants per square mile (4.9/km^{2}). There were 204 housing units at an average density of 5.6 per square mile (2.2/km^{2}). The racial makeup of the township was 99.14% White, 0.43% Asian, and 0.43% from two or more races. Hispanic or Latino of any race were 0.43% of the population.

There were 191 households, out of which 27.2% had children under the age of 18 living with them, 73.8% were married couples living together, 1.0% had a female householder with no husband present, and 23.0% were non-families. 23.0% of all households were made up of individuals, and 16.2% had someone living alone who was 65 years of age or older. The average household size was 2.42 and the average family size was 2.85.

In the township the population was spread out, with 23.8% under the age of 18, 4.5% from 18 to 24, 23.5% from 25 to 44, 23.3% from 45 to 64, and 24.8% who were 65 years of age or older. The median age was 44 years. For every 100 females, there were 100.4 males. For every 100 females age 18 and over, there were 96.1 males.

The median income for a household in the township was $31,818, and the median income for a family was $37,500. Males had a median income of $26,417 versus $23,750 for females. The per capita income for the township was $14,948. About 11.8% of families and 12.8% of the population were below the poverty line, including 20.2% of those under age 18 and 17.2% of those age 65 or over.

== Politics ==
Leota Township is located in Minnesota's 1st congressional district, represented by Mankato educator Tim Walz, a Democrat. At the state level, Leota Township is located in Senate District 22, represented by Republican Doug Magnus, and in House District 22A, represented by Republican Joe Schomacker.

== Local politics ==
Leota Township is represented by Nobles County Commissioner Gene Metz
