= 1992 Chandler–Lake Wilson tornado =

1992 violent tornado

- A photograph of the violent F5 tornado.

Meteorological history
- Formed: June 16, 1992, 5:00 p.m. CST (UTC−06:00)
- Dissipated: June 16, 1992, 5:25 p.m. CST (UTC−06:00)
- Duration: 25 minutes

F5 tornado
- on the Fujita scale
- Highest winds: 261–318 mph (420–512 km/h)

Overall effects
- Fatalities: 1
- Injuries: 40+
- Damage: $50 million (1992 USD)
- Part of the Tornado outbreak of June 14–18, 1992 and tornado outbreaks of 1992

During the afternoon hours of June 16, 1992, a large and extremely violent tornado, commonly known as the Chandler–Lake Wilson tornado, tore through the small towns of Chandler and Lake Wilson in Murray County, Minnesota. The damage in Chandler was extreme enough for the local National Weather Service office to rate the damage F5 on the Fujita scale, which included the destruction of the Chandler-Lake Wilson High School building on the west side of town. This tornado is the most recent F5/EF5 tornado in the state of Minnesota, and is the second most recent U.S. tornado to occur in June, the most recent being the 2025 Enderlin Tornado.

== Meteorological synopsis ==
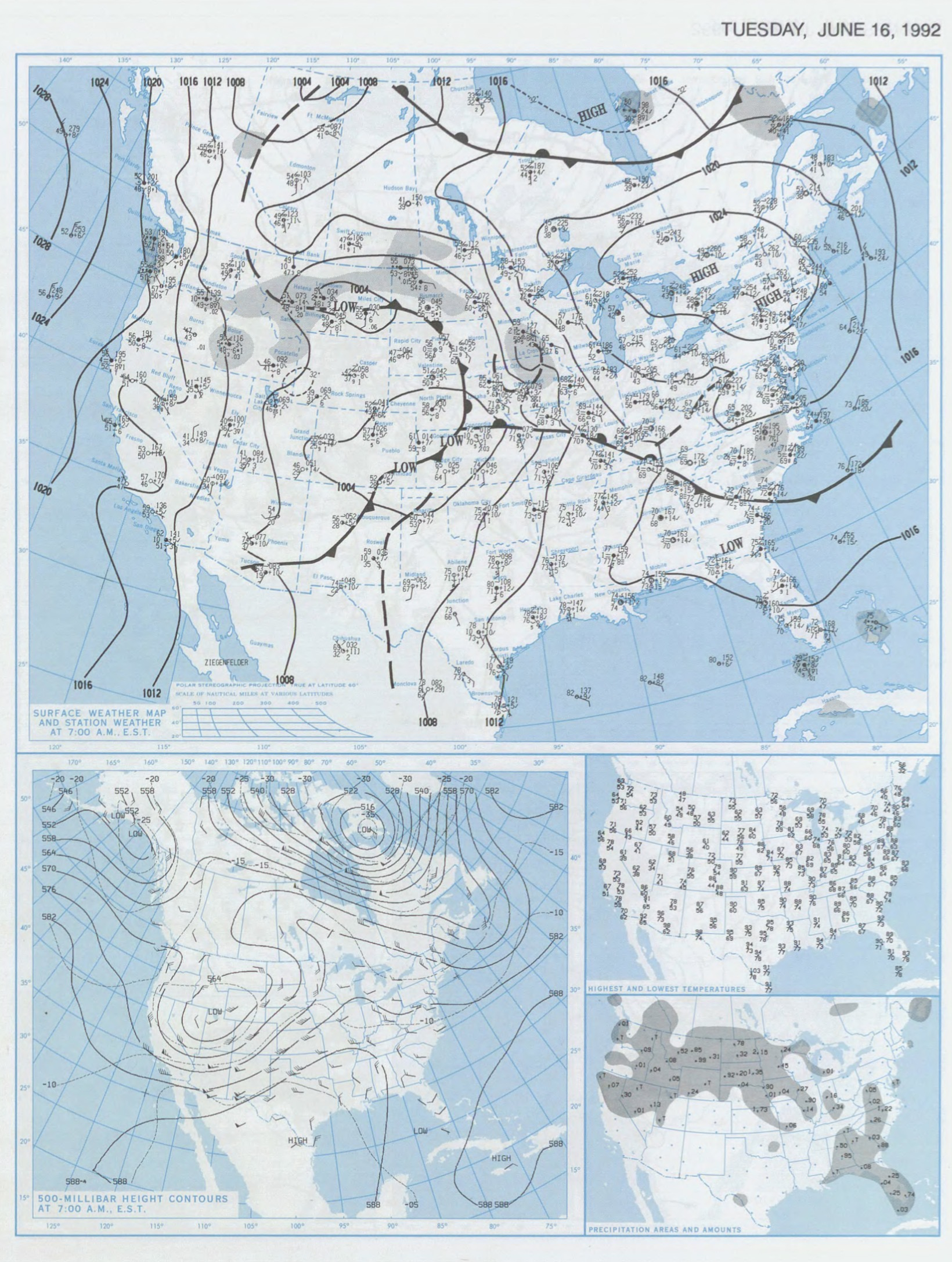
1200 UTC upper-air, surface, and temperature analysis reveals the presence of multiple lows that ultimately contributed to the formation of severe weather in the Upper Midwest region.

At 1200 UTC (6:00 a.m. CST) on the day of the Chandler-Lake Wilson tornado, upper-air analyses revealed a 500-millibar area of low pressure over the Rocky Mountains region, specifically over the states of Nevada, Wyoming, Utah, and Idaho, with a high-pressure system to the south influencing the low pressure system to assume a northeasterly trajectory, upwards towards the Upper Midwest & Minnesota region. At the surface, various disconnected areas of low pressure existed, with an occluded front following the mesoscale system towards the Upper Midwest as well. One area of low pressure, centered around northern Kansas, featured a classic cold front extending to the south, and a warm front extending to the east. The region in between these two fronts is known as the warm sector, and is where the most unstable region in a low pressure system can be found. The warm sector is often where severe weather and tornadoes form, due to the approaching cold front forcing the convection, or rising, of warm air — however, other factors beyond the instability of the warm sector alone aided in the development of severe weather.

By 0000 UTC June 17, 1992 (6:00 P.M. CST June 16), the low pressure system (and associated warm sector) centered over Kansas had been pushed upwards, with the surrounding environment becoming highly sheared due to the presence of a potent jet stream overspreading the region. Dew points rose significantly, and a dry line was observed ahead of the cold front, making for a classic "triple point" setup. An elevated mixed layer over the region allowed for daytime heating and a sharp increase in instability, which resulted in an "explosion" in convection, with "at least two dozen" tornadoes being reported in the NWS Sioux Falls, SD office region on June 16 alone. By this time, the Chandler tornado had already occurred, but this provides an accurate description for the synoptic patterns that influenced the tornado.

== Tornado summary ==
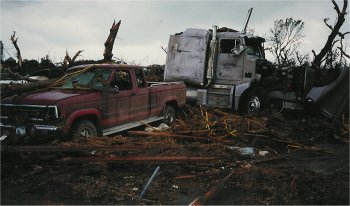
Significant damage to a farmstead east of Leota after the tornado. Photo taken June 17, 1992.

According to the National Oceanic and Atmospheric Administration (NOAA), "two violent twisters" caused catastrophic damage in the areas around Chandler and Lake Wilson in Murray County, Minnesota. Despite being officially referred to as two tornadoes, the tornadoes received a joint, single rating of F5 on the Fujita scale. The tornado touched down 2 miles (3.2 km) south of Leota and moved northeast as it rapidly intensified. Just east of Leota, two farmsteads were completely destroyed at F5 intensity. At approximately 5:18 pm, the tornado, which had intensified even further, struck Chandler, where it caused extreme damage, leaving half of the town leveled. In Chandler, 36 people were injured, with one person dying from their injuries two months later. The National Weather Service referred to the tornado as a "maxi-tornado" as it struck Chandler. It was documented that in the towns of Chandler and Lake Wilson, the tornado caused at least $27 million (1992 USD), with another $17 million (1992 USD) in damage occurring in rural parts of Murray County. In total, the tornado killed one person, injured over 40 others, and caused at least $50 million (1992 USD) in damage along its 35 miles (56 km) track. The tornado had a maximum width of .75 miles (1.21 km) around the Chandler-Lake Wilson area. This was the only F5 tornado to occur in the United States in 1992.

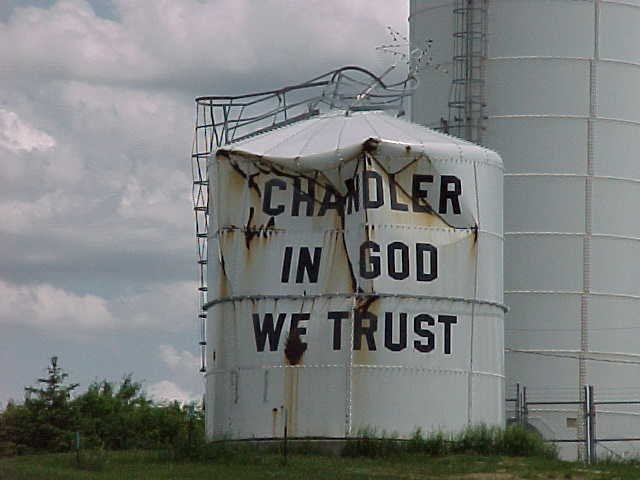
Significant damage to the Chandler water tower after the tornado. Photo taken June 17, 1992.

In 2019, meteorologist Jen Narramore, who previously worked for The Weather Channel, found several discrepancies with the official publications and records from NOAA, with the National Climatic Data Center and Storm Prediction Center stating the tornado's path length was only 16 miles (26 km), while the local National Weather Service office states the official path length was 35 miles (56 km). In Narramore's assessment, it was stated the path length was most likely to be approximately 16 miles (26 km), but slightly different than what was listed by the Storm Prediction Center.

== Aftermath ==
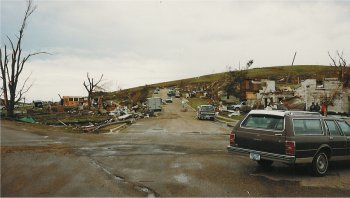
The western side of Chandler, Minnesota immediately after the F5 tornado on June 16, 1992. Photo taken June 17, 1992.

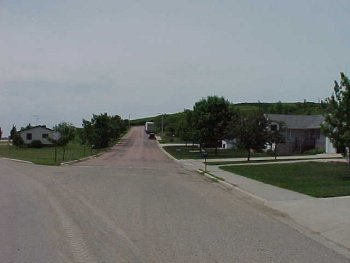
The western side of Chandler, Minnesota 10 years after the tornado. Photo taken June 12, 2002.

With large portions of the communities of Leota, Chandler, and Lake Wilson destroyed, including the destruction of multiple farmsteads, businesses, and the Chandler-Lake Wilson High School building & water tower, cleanup and reconstruction were quickly underway. In June of 2002 — around the time of the 10th anniversary of the Chandler-Lake Wilson tornado — the NWS Sioux Falls, SD office sought to document what had been rebuilt, and included a section in their summary of the tornado comparing the same locations immediately after the tornado and ten years later. The photos that were taken made it clear that these communities had worked extensively to restore the region, including replacing the damaged Chandler water tower, and rebuilding homes on plots that had been previously destroyed in the 1992 tornado. Multiple psychological effects from the tornado still remain in the residents of the affected communities, but ultimately, the area has made a full recovery.

== See also ==
- List of F5 and EF5 tornadoes
- Tornadoes of 1992
- Tornado outbreak of June 14–18, 1992
- 2025 Enderlin tornado - The only F5/EF5-rated tornado to occur in June after the Chandler-Lake Wilson tornado.
