= Tornadoes of 1992 =

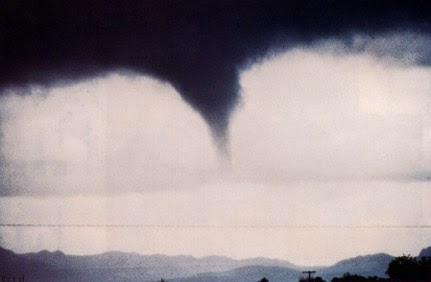
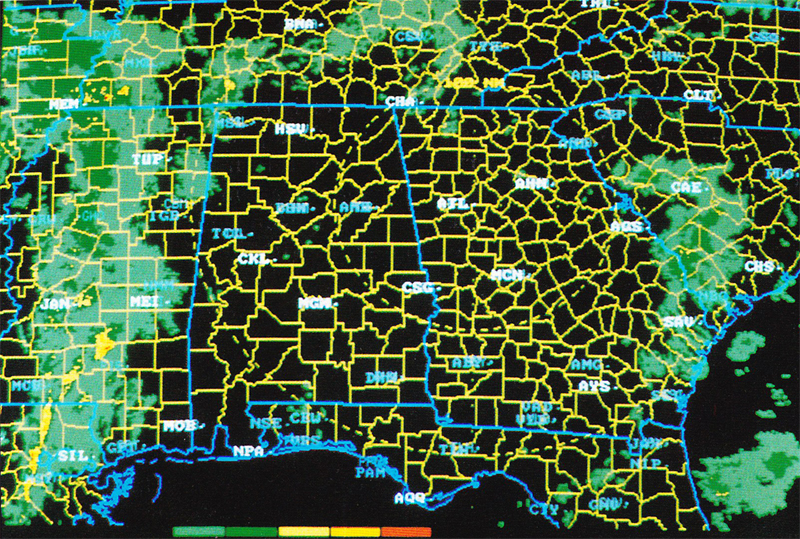
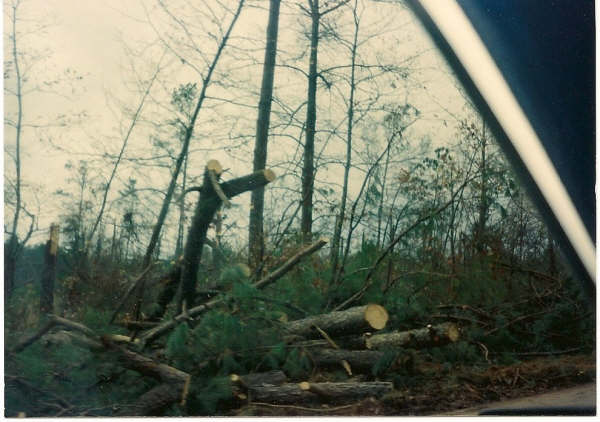
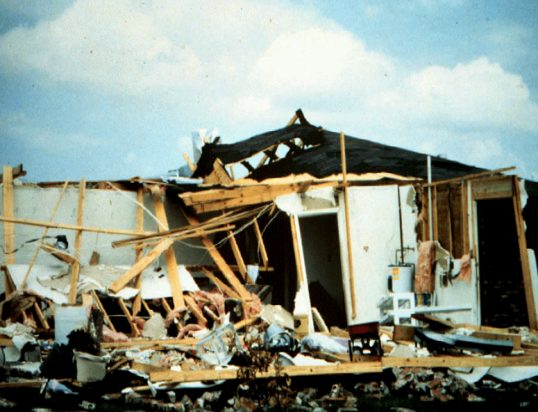
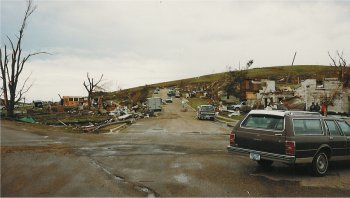
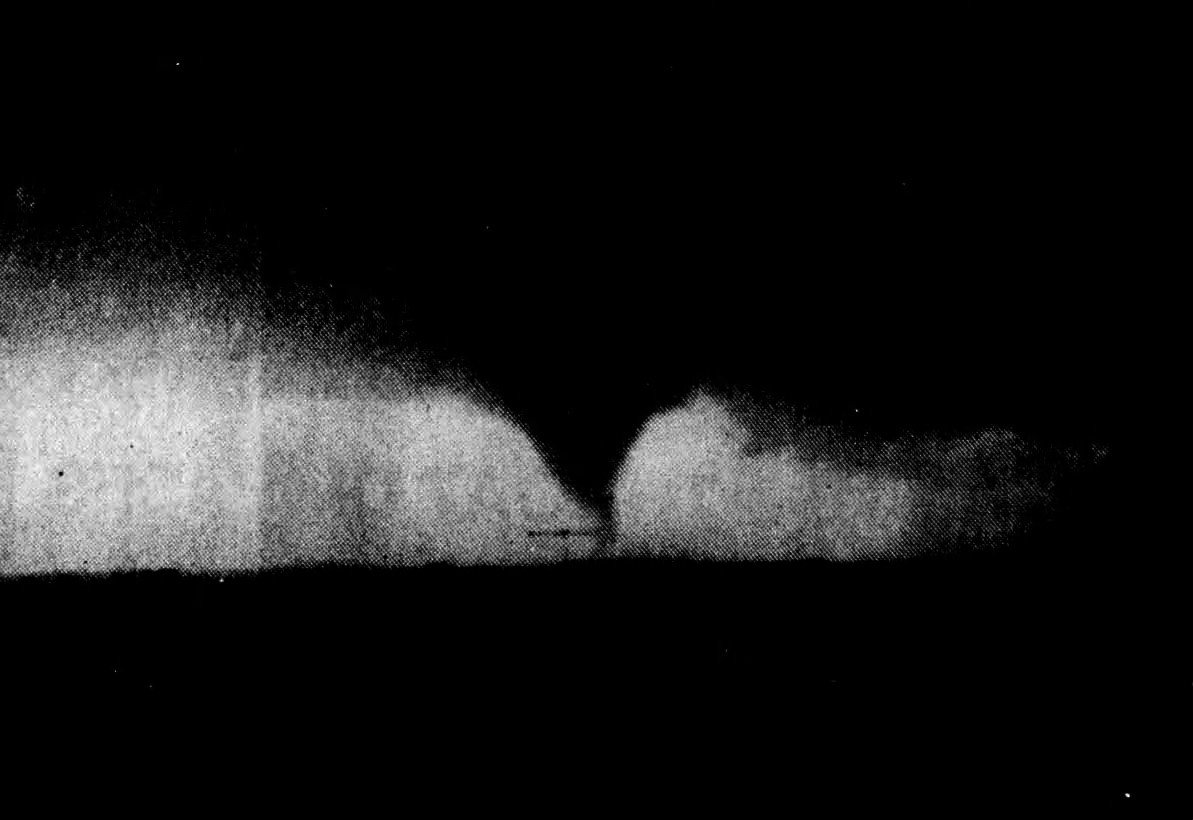
- Clockwise from top: An F2 tornado near Beaver, Utah on May 21; Tornado damage on the western side of Wooten Lake Road in Cobb County, Georgia; The western portions of Chandler, Minnesota after an F5 tornado on June 16; An F2 tornado near Concord, Nebraska on May 16; F3 level damage to a home in LaPlace, Louisiana following a tornado on August 25; A radar image of tornado producing supercells over Mississippi on November 22.
- Maximum rated tornado: F5 tornado: Chandler, Minnesota on June 16
- Tornadoes in U.S.: 1,313
- Damage (U.S.): >$542 million
- Fatalities (U.S.): 39
- Fatalities (worldwide): >43

This page documents the tornadoes and tornado outbreaks of 1992, primarily in the United States. Most tornadoes form in the U.S., although some events may take place internationally. Tornado statistics for older years like this often appear significantly lower than modern years due to fewer reports or confirmed tornadoes, however by the 1990s tornado statistics were coming closer to the numbers we see today.

== Synopsis ==
Fatal United States tornadoes in 1992
- Approximate touchdown location of killer tornadoes in 1992
Summary of tornadoes
- March 10 – Mississippi (3 deaths)
- March 10 – Alabama (2 deaths)
- June 16 – Minnesota (1 death)
- August 25 – Louisiana (2 deaths)
- August 29 – Wisconsin (1 death)
- October 3 – Florida (1 death)
- October 3 – Florida (3 deaths)
- November 21 – Mississippi (12 deaths)
- November 22 – Mississippi (2 deaths)
- November 22 – Mississippi (1 Death)
- November 22 – Tennessee (1 death)
- November 22 – Georgia (1 death)
- November 22 – Georgia (5 deaths)
- November 22 – Kentucky, Indiana (1 death)
- November 22 – Georgia, South Carolina (1 death)
- November 23 – North Carolina (2 deaths)
Total fatalities: 39

The tornado season of 1992 was unusual, with a quiet early season that picked up late. Numbers were low through April, with May seeing a below average number of tornadoes. However, the summer of 1992 was unusually active - June set a then-record for tornadoes with 399 in one month (which was first eclipsed in May 2003). July also brought record levels of activity, and August was also well above average (partially due to Hurricane Andrew).

Finally, November saw a major outbreak from the 21st to 23rd, resulting in 26 deaths.

== Events ==
Confirmed tornado total for the entire year 1992 in the United States.

Confirmed tornadoes by Fujita rating
FU	F0	F1	F2	F3	F4	F5	Total
0	699	427	129	44	13	1	1,313

== January ==
There were 15 tornadoes confirmed in the US in January.

=== January 7 ===
FU	F0	F1	F2	F3	F4	F5
0	1	4	1	0	0	0

A brief F2 struck a homestead northeast of Rockville, Nebraska, tearing of part of a barn roof also blowing lumber into the side of a house.

== February ==
There were 29 tornadoes confirmed in the US in February.

=== February 18 ===
FU	F0	F1	F2	F3	F4	F5
0	1	0	0	0	1	0

A brief F4 tornado touched down north of the Van Wert-Mercer county line in Ohio continuing 2.8 miles (4.5 km) to the northeast before disipating. This tornado injured 6 and resulted in no fatalities. It also had a peak width of 40 yards (0.023 mi).

== March ==
There were 55 tornadoes confirmed in the US in March.

=== March 3–10 ===
FU	F0	F1	F2	F3	F4	F5
0	17	14	3	2	1	0

A tornado outbreak sequence affected the country for seven straight days. On March 9, an 880 yard wide F4 tornado carved a 20 mile path through Sharkey, Washington, and Humphreys Counties in Mississippi, injuring one person. On March 10, five people were killed by two F3 tornadoes in Mississippi and Alabama. Overall, 37 tornadoes touched down, five people were killed, and 100 others were injured.

=== March 30 ===
FU	F0	F1	F2	F3	F4	F5
0	2	1	0	0	0	0

The southern Las Vegas Valley was hit by two tornadoes, including an F1 tornado that shifted one home and partially unroofed another. Despite being one of the strongest tornadoes in Nevada history, there were no fatalities or injuries with this tornado. Elsewhere, an F0 tornado also touched down in Florida.

== April ==
There were 53 tornadoes confirmed in the US in April.

== May ==
There were 137 tornadoes confirmed in the US in May.

=== May 6 (Argentina) ===
A powerful F4 tornado hit the small village of Estacion Lopez (200 inhabitants), in the center of the province of Buenos Aires in Argentina. After destroying 90% of households and tossing vehicles for hundreds of meters, the storm was categorized as one of the strongest tornadoes in the history of Argentina and the Southern Hemisphere. Four fatalities occurred.

=== May 11 ===
FU	F0	F1	F2	F3	F4	F5
0	10	12	9	1	1	0

An outbreak of 33 tornadoes hit Texas, Oklahoma, and Kansas. This included an F4 tornado which traveled near Kiowa, Oklahoma. No fatalities occurred from this tornado outbreak.

== June ==
There were 399 tornadoes confirmed in the US in June. That set the former all time record high for a single month until May 2003 with 542 verified tornadoes, as well as the current all time record high for the month of June.

=== June 7 ===
FU	F0	F1	F2	F3	F4	F5
0	11	1	2	0	0	0

A small tornado outbreak produced two F2 tornadoes in Eddy County, New Mexico, and Vernon, Texas, but there were no fatalities.

=== June 14–18 ===
FU	F0	F1	F2	F3	F4	F5
0	54	64	33	15	3	1

One of the largest tornado outbreaks on record affected portions of the Central United States from June 14 to the 18th. The outbreak began on June 14 when six tornadoes touched down in Colorado and Idaho. 58 tornadoes were reported across portions of the Great Plains on June 15, and 65 more were reported over much of the central U.S. on June 16. 28 more tornadoes touched down on June 17, and 13 more touched down on June 18, giving this outbreak 170 confirmed tornadoes.Then, in El Paso County Texas. 3 tornadoes touched down 2 F-1 Tornadoes, and 1 F-0 Tornado

=== June 27 ===
FU	F0	F1	F2	F3	F4	F5
0	13	4	3	1	2	0

An F4 tornado struck the city of Fritch, Texas. None were killed and seven people were injured, but the city sustained major damage.

== July ==
There were 213 tornadoes confirmed in the US in July.

=== July 6 (Panama) ===
A rare and destructive tornado ripped through Panama City, the capital city of Panama, killing 12 people as it damaged many homes, factories and schools. The tornado produced winds of 200 km/h (125 mph), classifying it as an F2.

== August ==
There were 115 tornadoes confirmed in the US in August.

=== August 25–28 ===
FU	F0	F1	F2	F3	F4	F5
0	43	21	1	1	0	0

After moving across South Florida without spawning any tornadoes the day before, Hurricane Andrew spawned an F3 tornado in LaPlace, Louisiana as it approached the Louisiana coast on August 25, killing two people and injuring 32 others. Over the next three days, a tornado outbreak struck areas from the Lower Mississippi Valley up the Appalachian Mountains corridor. Most of the tornadoes were weak, but one F2 tornado did occur in Chester County, Pennsylvania, injuring three people. Overall, the outbreak spawned 66 tornadoes, killed 2 people, and injured 54 others.

== September ==
There were 81 tornadoes confirmed in the US in September.

== October ==
There were 34 tornadoes confirmed in the US in October.

=== October 3 ===
FU	F0	F1	F2	F3	F4	F5
0	4	5	1	1	0	0

A destructive and deadly tornado outbreak struck Florida and Georgia. Central Pinellas County, Florida took the brunt of the outbreak, as they were struck by three tornadoes in the early morning hours, including both strong tornadoes. All three deaths and 75 of the 77 injuries came from that county alone. A total of 11 tornadoes were confirmed from the outbreak.

== November ==
There were 161 tornadoes confirmed in the US in November.

=== November 3 ===
FU	F0	F1	F2	F3	F4	F5
0	1	14	0	1	0	0

On the day of the 1992 US Presidential Election, 15 total tornadoes, 1 outside of Louisiana, (only the strongest mentioned here as none of Nov 3's tornadoes caused casualties) touched down in the State of Louisiana (except for one). The most powerful was an F3 tornado that formed 6 miles west of Bryceland, Louisiana. It traveled for 7 miles northeast through parts of Bienville Parish before striking the parish seat of Arcadia, Louisiana. The tornado itself was 300 yards in width. It destroyed 12 homes and two businesses, 75 other homes sustained damage and the tornado lifted 1.5 miles northeast of town; but there were no casualties (disputed by Shreveport Times, but official report shows none). It is arguably the town's most infamous event only second to the Ambush of Bonnie & Clyde.

=== November 21–23 ===
FU	F0	F1	F2	F3	F4	F5
0	12	36	26	15	6	0

A three-day tornado outbreak struck large parts of the eastern and Midwestern U.S. on November 21–23. Also sometimes referred to as the Widespread Outbreak (as was the Super Outbreak initially), this exceptionally long lasting and geographically large outbreak produced over $300 million in damage, along with 26 deaths and 641 injuries in Alabama, Georgia, Indiana, Kentucky, Maryland, Mississippi, North Carolina, Ohio, South Carolina, Tennessee, Texas, and Virginia.

=== November 29 (Australia) ===
FU	F0	F1	F2	F3	F4	F5
0	0	0	0	1	1	0

Two very powerful tornadoes occurred near Bundaberg, Queensland, on November 29, 1992. They were officially rated as F3 and F4, being the most powerful confirmed tornadoes in Australia and among the most powerful tornadoes recorded in the southern hemisphere. Several houses were destroyed, however damage was light due to the tornadoes striking a relatively unpopulated rural area.

== December ==
There were 20 tornadoes confirmed in the US in December.

=== December 7 ===
FU	F0	F1	F2	F3	F4	F5
0	3	2	0	0	0	0

5 tornadoes struck California. The first one uprooted 22 trees and caused damage to outdoor patio furniture in Moorpark. The second one struck Westminster near Garden Grove, where former actor Jennette McCurdy was raised at. She would have been a few months old. The tornado destroyed three mobile homes and damaged a few more. Numerous power lines were blown down and trees were uprooted. The third one struck Anaheim and flipped moving cars. Trees were blown down, skylights were torn off from a roof, and water was sucked from street gutters for one city block. The fourth one struck San Clemente moving through a neighborhood, ripping out a small grove of trees, and toppling a light standard. The fifth and final one struck Carlsbad. It started as a waterspout and moved on shore. The tornado blew down three carports at a mobile home park, destroyed a plate glass window, and downed a power pole.

== See also ==
- Tornado
  - Tornadoes by year
  - Tornado records
  - Tornado climatology
  - Tornado myths
- List of tornado outbreaks
  - List of F5 and EF5 tornadoes
  - List of North American tornadoes and tornado outbreaks
  - List of 21st-century Canadian tornadoes and tornado outbreaks
  - List of European tornadoes and tornado outbreaks
  - List of tornadoes and tornado outbreaks in Asia
  - List of Southern Hemisphere tornadoes and tornado outbreaks
  - List of tornadoes striking downtown areas
- Tornado intensity
  - Fujita scale
  - Enhanced Fujita scale
