= Champepadan Creek =

Stream in Minnesota, U.S.

Coordinates: 43°42′06″N 96°09′01″W

Champepadan Creek is a stream in the U.S. state of Minnesota.

The name Champepadan comes from the Sioux language and means "thorny wood river".

== See also ==
- List of rivers of Minnesota
