= Leota, Minnesota =

Unincorporated community in Minnesota, US

Leota
- CDP
- Location of Leota in Nobles County and Minnesota
- Coordinates: 43°49′48″N 96°01′18″W
- Country: United States
- State: Minnesota
- County: Nobles

Area
  - Total: 1.52 sq mi (3.93 km^{2})
  - Land: 1.52 sq mi (3.93 km^{2})
  - Water: 0 sq mi (0.00 km^{2})
- Elevation: 1,703 ft (519 m)

Population (2020)
  - Total: 202
  - Density: 133.0/sq mi (51.37/km^{2})
- Time zone: UTC-6 (Central (CST))
  - Summer (DST): UTC-5 (CDT)
- ZIP code: 56153
- Area code: 507
- FIPS code: 27-36548
- GNIS feature ID: 2393098

Leota is a census-designated place (CDP) in Leota Township, Nobles County, Minnesota, United States. As of the 2020 census, Leota had a population of 202.

== Geography ==
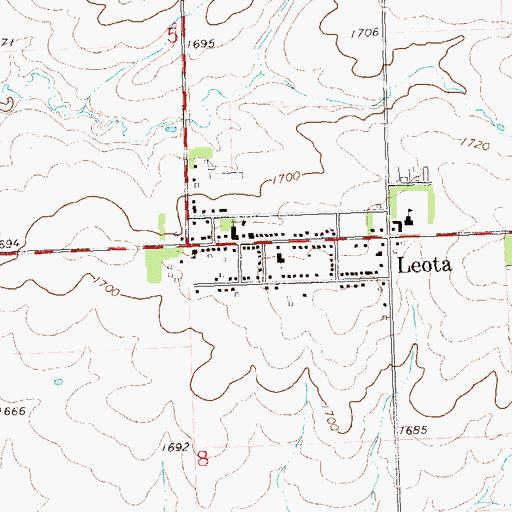
Topographic Map of Leota

According to the United States Census Bureau, the CDP has a total area of 1.4 square miles (3.6 km^{2}), all land. Leota is situated on the western side of the Buffalo Ridge, the drainage divide between the Mississippi River and Missouri River systems.

Main highways include:

- Nobles County Road 19
- Nobles County Road 20

== History ==
Leota street scene

Homestead of Martin Kallemeyen, first Dutch settler in Leota Township

The town of Leota was named after Leota Township in which it is located. The story has it that Leota was the name of a young Indian woman who figured in a romantic story familiar to W. G. Barnard, one of the township's first residents. However existence of such a story cannot be verified. If true, Leota Township (and the town of Leota) are the only place names in all of Nobles County that memorialize specific Native Americans. The town of Leota is situated on sections 5 and 8 of the township. Leota was established in 1891 as a settlement of Dutch Farmers who migrated northward from another Dutch Settlement in Orange City, Iowa. The first building erected in Leota was the Dutch Reformed Church. Later in 1891, John DeBoer, Nick DeBoer, and James TenCate erected a second building that became Leota's first general store. A post office was established in 1893, and the Christian Reformed Church was built in 1898. The town was surveyed by M. S. Smith for James TenCate, and the plat was dedicated on January 1, 1902. Leota was never incorporated, though it remains a thriving community. The U. S. Census Bureau classifies Leota as a census-designated place (CDP). CDPs are populated areas that lack separate municipal government, but which otherwise physically resemble incorporated places.

== Demographics ==
Historical population
| Census | Pop. | Note | %± |
|---|---|---|---|
| 2020 | 202 | | — |
U.S. Decennial Census

As of the census of 2000, there were 230 people, 113 households, and 76 families residing in the CDP. The population density was 169.0 inhabitants per square mile (65.3/km^{2}). There were 122 housing units at an average density of 89.6 per square mile (34.6/km^{2}). The racial makeup of the CDP was 100.00% White. Hispanic or Latino of any race were 0.87% of the population.

There were 113 households, out of which 17.7% had children under the age of 18 living with them, 64.6% were married couples living together, 1.8% had a female householder with no husband present, and 31.9% were non-families. 31.9% of all households were made up of individuals, and 23.9% had someone living alone who was 65 years of age or older. The average household size was 2.04 and the average family size was 2.52.

In the CDP, the population was spread out, with 15.7% under the age of 18, 4.3% from 18 to 24, 17.0% from 25 to 44, 24.3% from 45 to 64, and 38.7% who were 65 years of age or older. The median age was 58 years. For every 100 females, there were 91.7 males. For every 100 females age 18 and over, there were 86.5 males.

The median income for a household in the CDP was $30,568, and the median income for a family was $35,625. Males had a median income of $27,019 versus $30,714 for females. The per capita income for the CDP was $15,664. About 10.6% of families and 8.5% of the population were below the poverty line, including 7.0% of those under the age of eighteen and 16.5% of those 65 or over.

== Politics ==
Leota is located in Minnesota's 1st congressional district, represented by Republican Brad Finstad of New Ulm. At the state level, Leota is located in Senate District 22, represented by Republican Bill Weber, and in House District 22A, represented by Republican Bjorn Olson.

=== Local politics ===
Village Government: Kenneth Bolkema, Chairman; Brent Feikema, Clerk; Loren DeGroot, Treasurer; Anthoy Van’t Hof, Supervisor; Jeff Tweet, Supervisor. Leota Township is represented by Nobles County Commissioner Gene Metz.
