= Tornado outbreak of November 21–23, 1992 =

1992 natural disaster in the eastern and midwestern US

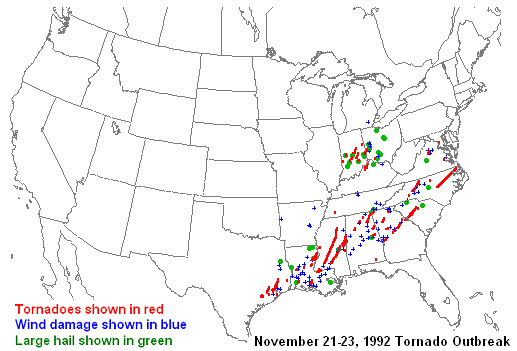
- Map of reports from the November 1992 tornado outbreak.

Meteorological history
- Duration: November 21-23, 1992

Tornado outbreak
- Tornadoes: 95
- Max. rating: F4 tornado
- Duration: 41 hours

Overall effects
- Fatalities: 26
- Injuries: 641
- Damage: >$300 million (1992 USD)
- Areas affected: Southeastern United States, Ohio Valley
- Part of the tornado outbreaks of 1992

The Tornado outbreak of November 1992, sometimes referred to as The Widespread Outbreak (as was the 1974 Super Outbreak initially), was a devastating and large three-day outbreak of tornadoes that struck the Eastern and Midwestern United States on November 21–23. This exceptionally long-lived and geographically large outbreak produced 95 tornadoes over a 41-hour period, making it one of the longest-lasting and largest outbreaks ever recorded in the US, and published studies of the outbreak have indicated the possibility of even more tornadoes (92, 94, 146 and 143, with higher numbers reflected in NOAA studies). There were 26 fatalities, 641 injuries, and over $300 million in damage.

== Meteorological synopsis ==
On November 21, 1992, a very strong cold-core low was located over southeastern New Mexico; in nearby El Paso, mid-level temperatures of −31 °C (−24 °F) were recorded. Rounding the base of this feature was an 80 knots (90 mph; 150 km/h) jet streak. At the surface and in the lower levels of the atmosphere, low pressure was becoming established across western Texas. Strong wind flow in advance of these features led to the northward transport of warm, moist air from the Gulf of Mexico and into the Southern United States. The cold-core low progressed northeastward from western Texas toward the eastern Great Lakes region as the tornado outbreak unfolded. Areas of low pressure at and just above the surface followed similar tracks, with the associated low-level jet advancing across most of the Gulf Coast region and eventually along the Atlantic Coast. A preceding system had left a weak cold front stretching from Texas to Michigan on November 21, and in fact, forecasters initially questioned whether moisture would be sufficient for an organized severe weather event across Texas the following day. However, continued southerly flow advanced dewpoints in excess of 65 °F (18 °C) across central and southern portions of the state, and the cold front soon surged northward as a warm front instead. Convective available potential energy values, though modest, still reached 1,000 J/kg across southern Texas. This moist and unstable environment, combined with very strong wind shear, promoted the development of an intense squall line and isolated supercells ahead of it, contributing to multiple tornadoes in the Greater Houston area on the afternoon of November 21. As the squall line spread eastward the next day, an intense low-level jet contributed to provide favorable wind profiles, abundant moisture, and a sufficiently unstable airmass. As such, the line of thunderstorms maintained vigor as it moved eastward across the Gulf Coast, while discrete supercells continued to form to its east. The same general environment persisted into the Mid-Atlantic early on November 23. This severe weather setup contributed to dozens of tornadoes during that time, many of which were significant and deadly.

Farther north, a secondary concentration of tornadoes developed across the Ohio River Valley, resulting in the most damaging late-season tornado outbreak at the time there. Environmental conditions were more comparable to a widespread springtime event instead of a late season event.

Outbreak death toll
State	Total	County	County total
Georgia	6	Greene	1
Georgia	6	Lumpkin	1
Georgia	6	Putnam	4
Kentucky	1	Carroll	1
Mississippi	15	Choctaw	1
Mississippi	15	Kemper	1
Mississippi	15	Leake	1
Mississippi	15	Rankin	10
Mississippi	15	Webster	2
North Carolina	2	Orange	2
South Carolina	1	Saluda	1
Tennessee	1	Hardeman	1
Totals	26		
All deaths were tornado-related

== Confirmed tornadoes ==
Confirmed tornadoes by Fujita rating
FU	F0	F1	F2	F3	F4	F5	Total
0	12	36	26	15	6	0	95

=== November 21 event ===
List of confirmed tornadoes – Saturday, November 21, 1992 (Note: All dates are based on the local time zone where the tornado touched down; however, all times are in Coordinated Universal Time for consistency.)
F#	Location	County / Parish	State	Start Coord.	Time (UTC)	Path length	Max width	Summary
F1	NE of Glen Flora	Wharton	TX	29.38°N 96.18°W	19:30	0.5 mi (0.80 km)	100 yd (91 m)	Several barns were damaged or destroyed.
F1	NE of Jones Creek	Wharton	TX	29.30°N 96.28°W	19:40	1 mi (1.6 km)	100 yd (91 m)	Several barns were damaged or destroyed.
F1	W of Wharton	Wharton	TX	29.30°N 96.13°W	20:15	1 mi (1.6 km)	100 yd (91 m)	One unoccupied home was destroyed.
F2	NE of Foster to W of Deco	Fort Bend, Harris	TX	29.68°N 95.80°W	20:20	25 mi (40 km)	200 yd (180 m)	A strong tornado began in the Cinco Ranch area before moving into Katy, where roofs and walls were removed from homes, garages were destroyed, and some homes under construction collapsed. The tornado crossed I-10 and struck West Houston Lakeside Airport, destroying several metal hangars and 12 planes. The tornado continued through residential areas of northwest Houston, destroying garages and causing roof damage to homes. Several apartment complexes and a Randalls store sustained roof damage as well. The tornado caused substantial roof and wall damage to more than 100 homes. Camera footage revealed that the tornado sometimes exhibited multiple vortices. Eleven people were injured.
F1	Pecan Grove	Fort Bend	TX	29.62°N 95.75°W	20:40	1 mi (1.6 km)	200 yd (180 m)	Garages were destroyed, and 78 homes were reported to have received roof damage.
F1	E of Thompsons	Fort Bend	TX	29.47°N 95.62°W	20:45	1 mi (1.6 km)	200 yd (180 m)	A barn and many outbuildings were destroyed. Several large trees were damaged as well.
F1	Pearland	Brazoria, Harris	TX	29.57°N 95.28°W	21:10	2.5 mi (4.0 km)	200 yd (180 m)	A tornado removed shingles and cladding from six homes. Additional commercial and apartment buildings sustained roof damage as well.
F3	SE of Huffman to W of Rye	Harris, Liberty	TX	30.02°N 95.08°W	21:20	32 mi (51 km)	300 yd (270 m)	F3 tree damage began near the northeast end of Lake Houston. Less intense damage occurred to residential buildings in Tarkington and Hoot and Holler, east of Romayor.
F2	SW of Riverside Terrace to NW of Jacinto City	Harris	TX	29.70°N 95.38°W	21:20	12 mi (19 km)	200 yd (180 m)	The tornado began near Hermann Park, close to Rice University in Houston, before moving through residential and industrial areas. Many homes lost their roofs and walls were collapsed at masonry buildings. After touching down, the tornado crossed heavily trafficked U.S. Route 59, Interstate 45, I-10, and I-610, damaging more than 600 buildings, including 500 residences. Despite crossing many busy roads, the tornado only caused six negligible injuries.
F4	W of Galena Park to N of Dayton	Harris, Liberty	TX	29.73°N 95.28°W	21:27	30 mi (48 km)	1,800 yd (1,600 m)	See section on this tornado – 15 people were injured.
F2	SE of Schwab City	Polk	TX	30.58°N 94.80°W	21:27	2 mi (3.2 km)	200 yd (180 m)	A few trees were downed and two barns were destroyed. The tornado injured one person.
F1	NE of Crosby	Harris, Liberty	TX	29.93°N 95.02°W	22:15	4 mi (6.4 km)	200 yd (180 m)	Several homes reported minor damage, but mostly losses were to outbuildings on farms.
F0	E of Texas City	Galveston	TX	29.40°N 94.90°W	22:45	0.1 mi (0.16 km)	10 yd (9.1 m)	Trees were downed and windows were smashed. A radio antenna was also bent over.
F1	S of Buna	Jasper	TX	30.43°N 93.97°W	00:00	0.5 mi (0.80 km)	40 yd (37 m)	Power lines were downed and trees were prostrated. Some roofs were removed and windows were broken.
F2	W of Simpson	Vernon	LA	31.20°N 93.13°W	01:12	6 mi (9.7 km)	150 yd (140 m)	A mobile home was thrown on top of a van and trees were prostrated. Rating disputed, ranked F1 by Grazulis.
F3	Iowa	Calcasieu, Jefferson Davis	LA	30.22°N 93.03°W	01:30–02:08	6 mi (9.7 km)	75 yd (69 m)	Six homes were destroyed and 18 damaged. There was $100,000 damage to an outlet mall that had its I-beams deformed and its roof blown away. Two people were injured.
F2	Tioga	Rapides	LA	31.38°N 92.43°W	02:50	0.5 mi (0.80 km)	150 yd (140 m)	Some homes were damaged and trees uprooted. Rating disputed, ranked F1 by Grazulis.
F1	Centreville	Wilkinson	MS	31.00°N 91.12°W	03:30	4 mi (6.4 km)	100 yd (91 m)	One mobile home and several barns were destroyed. Several other homes were damaged. Numerous trees were blown down.
F2	NE of Lozes to NE of Parks	Iberia, St. Marin	LA	30.05°N 91.92°W	03:30–03:45	15 mi (24 km)	75 yd (69 m)	Six mobile homes were destroyed, and one was overturned with a woman injured inside. The damage swath was discontinuous.
F2	N of Monterey	Catahoula	LA	31.47°N 91.72°W	03:45	0.5 mi (0.80 km)	100 yd (91 m)	The first of two tornadoes in Catahoula Parish destroyed 18 mobile homes, damaged two permanent homes, and downed trees. The tornado also caused $200,000 in timber damage alone.
F3	W of Monterey	Concordia	LA	31.47°N 91.72°W	03:45	3 mi (4.8 km)	100 yd (91 m)	A barn was unroofed and two homes and a mobile home were destroyed. The tornado caused an additional $200,000 in timber damage and injured six people.
F3	SW of Foules to SE of Richmond	Catahoula, Tensas, Madison	LA	31.82°N 91.60°W	03:55–04:15	38 mi (61 km)	200 yd (180 m)	The second tornado to strike Catahoula Parish first struck Foules, where it destroyed 12 mobile homes and a church. The tornado also damaged three permanent homes in Foules. It then struck Cooter Point, where it partially destroyed eight homes and completely destroyed a mobile home. In Madison Parish, the tornado heavily damaged two permanent homes and destroyed two mobile homes and three barns. It continued intermittently to near Tallulah before dissipating, completely destroying a church and three homes. Five other homes were damaged and eight nearly destroyed.
F2	N of Jackson	West Feliciana, East Feliciana	LA	30.87°N 91.27°W	04:00–04:15	13 mi (21 km)	100 yd (91 m)	Numerous greenhouses and six residences were destroyed.
F2	W of Goldman to S of Newellton	Tensas	LA	31.83°N 91.42°W	04:18–04:32	16 mi (26 km)	100 yd (91 m)	A tornado first downed numerous trees near Goldman before destroying three barns and damaging four other buildings near St. Joseph. The tornado destroyed several outbuildings and heavily damaged five homes south of Newellton before dissipating. In all, five homes were severely damaged and many outbuildings destroyed.
F1	W of Woodland	East Feliciana	LA	30.92°N 91.13°W	04:30–04:45	11 mi (18 km)	75 yd (69 m)	One home was destroyed and some others were damaged nearby.
F2	SE of West Lincoln to W of Beauregard	Lincoln, Copiah	MS	31.48°N 90.55°W	04:50–05:05	16 mi (26 km)	440 yd (400 m)	A tornado struck the town of Brookhaven. Four homes were destroyed and five others sustained major damage. Extensive tree and power pole damage occurred as well.
F1	E of Hazlehurst	Copiah	MS	31.82°N 90.38°W	05:15–05:24	9 mi (14 km)	440 yd (400 m)	One house was destroyed and several others were damaged. Numerous trees were downed as well.
F3	E of Oak Vale to Mount Olive	Jefferson Davis, Covington	MS	31.43°N 89.92°W	05:23–06:05	27 mi (43 km)	880 yd (800 m)	Many well-constructed homes were destroyed, including 14 in Jefferson Davis County and 32 in Mount Olive. In Jefferson Davis County, a total of 14 homes were destroyed and numerous trees were downed. In the town of Mount Olive, 32 homes were destroyed and 55 others were damaged. At least 105 people were injured.
F4	N of Hopewell to W of Sherwood	Copiah, Simpson, Rankin, Scott, Leake, Attala, Choctaw	MS	31.97°N 90.23°W	05:27–08:01	128 mi (206 km)	880 yd (800 m)	12 deaths — See section on this tornado – 122 people were injured.
F1	NE of Kelso	Sharkey	MS	32.68°N 90.87°W	05:30–05:38	10 mi (16 km)	440 yd (400 m)	A tornado damaged many vehicles and trees, and destroyed one mobile home. One house was damaged as well.
F4	NW of Wisner to Newton	Smith, Jasper, Newton	MS	31.85°N 89.52°W	06:14–07:14	40 mi (64 km)	1,760 yd (1,610 m)	This large and violent tornado produced a path 1 mi (1.6 km) wide through the Bienville National Forest and sparsely populated areas. Most of the damage was in Smith County, near Sylvarena. There, a large church was leveled and 90 homes were destroyed. The tornado then moved into Jasper County, where three houses and four mobile homes were destroyed. In the area, 21 houses and two mobile homes were damaged. In Newton County, six homes were damaged, one mobile home was destroyed, and one commercial building was destroyed. Timber loss was well into the millions of dollars, mainly through the Bienville National Forest, where substantial tree damage occurred over a wide, long swath.
F1	N of Little Rock	Newton, Neshoba	MS	32.53°N 89.03°W	07:22–07:35	9 mi (14 km)	200 yd (180 m)	One church had roof damage and four homes received severe damage. Two mobile homes were destroyed, four houses sustained major damage, and 16 homes had minor damage, mainly in the small community of House. Numerous trees and power lines were also downed.

=== November 22 event ===
List of confirmed tornadoes – Sunday, November 22, 1992 (Note: All dates are based on the local time zone where the tornado touched down; however, all times are in Coordinated Universal Time for consistency.)
F#	Location	County / Parish	State	Start Coord.	Time (UTC)	Path length	Max width	Summary
F1	W of Clarkson	Webster, Chickasaw	MS	33.62°N 89.17°W	08:14–08:25	9 mi (14 km)	200 yd (180 m)	2 deaths — The tornado destroyed a small wood-frame home in Clarkson, killing the two occupants. Four additional homes were seriously damaged and numerous trees were downed.
F2	E of Bloomfield to E of Dinsmore	Kemper, Noxubee	MS	32.80°N 88.70°W	08:15–08:55	27 mi (43 km)	880 yd (800 m)	1 Death — One house and several mobile homes were destroyed. Several other mobile homes were also damaged. One person was killed and another was injured in a wood-frame home just west of Wahalak.
F0	NW of Anchor	Chickasaw	MS	33.83°N 89.07°W	08:31–08:37	4 mi (6.4 km)	100 yd (91 m)	Several trees were downed.
F1	W of Parkersburg	Chickasaw	MS	33.95°N 89.05°W	08:45–08:54	7 mi (11 km)	100 yd (91 m)	Four mobile homes and one barn were destroyed. Airborne debris damaged a few cars.
F2	E of Prairie Point	Noxubee	MS	33.10°N 88.40°W	08:45–09:10	15 mi (24 km)	440 yd (400 m)	Major damage to 17 frame homes was reported, along with considerable tree damage. Six mobile homes were destroyed and two mobile homes had major damage.
F2	SE of Blackwater to SE of Millington	Kemper	MS	32.60°N 88.63°W	08:45–09:20	23 mi (37 km)	880 yd (800 m)	Large trees were torn up from the soil, many mobile homes were destroyed, and several houses sustained major damage.
F0	NW of Increase	Lauderdale	MS	32.27°N 88.58°W	09:20–09:22	2 mi (3.2 km)	100 yd (91 m)	Trees and power lines were blown down.
F2	SW of Panola	Sumter	AL	32.90°N 88.30°W	09:30–10:00	6 mi (9.7 km)	100 yd (91 m)	A church and five mobile homes were destroyed. Severe roof damage occurred to a school and many homes.
F2	NW of Ethelsville	Pickens	AL	33.42°N 88.22°W	09:30	2 mi (3.2 km)	125 yd (114 m)	A tornado destroyed half a dozen mobile homes, injuring seven people.
F1	NE of Bolivar	Hardeman	TN	35.27°N 89.00°W	09:50	16 mi (26 km)	75 yd (69 m)	1 death – About 30 homes were damaged or destroyed. A boy was killed when the tornado overturned a mobile home. Numerous trees and several power lines were downed as well. Three people were injured.
F1	N of Oakman	Walker	AL	33.72°N 87.40°W	11:18–11:35	10 mi (16 km)	45 yd (41 m)	A total of 35 structures were damaged or destroyed.
F0	Eva	Morgan	AL	34.30°N 86.80°W	12:20	6 mi (9.7 km)	18 yd (16 m)	A narrow, weak tornado unroofed a church and damaged a chicken coop. Other outbuildings were also damaged.
F2	NE of New Hope	Madison	AL	34.53°N 86.40°W	12:55	6 mi (9.7 km)	100 yd (91 m)	A total of 11 mobile homes were destroyed and 27 others were damaged. Another 10 residential homes received varying amounts of damage. All 5 injuries occurred in mobile homes.
F1	E of Rainsville	DeKalb	AL	34.45°N 85.85°W	14:00	6 mi (9.7 km)	50 yd (46 m)	No damage information is available.
F2	S of Crossville	DeKalb	AL	34.27°N 86.03°W	14:15	5 mi (8.0 km)	73 yd (67 m)	No damage information is available.
F2	NE of Sardis City	Etowah, DeKalb	AL	34.20°N 86.07°W	14:15	12 mi (19 km)	730 yd (670 m)	Numerous trees were downed and structures were damaged. Twelve people were injured.
F0	E of Lakeview	DeKalb	AL	34.37°N 85.92°W	14:20	3 mi (4.8 km)	23 yd (21 m)	No damage information is available.
F2	E of Keith, AL to NE of Rising Fawn, GA	DeKalb (AL), Dade, (GA)	AL, GA	34.67°N 85.68°W	14:40–15:10	10.5 mi (16.9 km)	500 yd (460 m)	Numerous trees were downed, a few homes sustained damage, and a trailer home was moved off its foundation.
F1	NW of Zana to SE of Wadley	Tallapoosa, Randolph	AL	33.03°N 85.73°W	14:40–15:10	17 mi (27 km)	50 yd (46 m)	Three homes were destroyed and 40 others were damaged. 29 businesses were damaged or destroyed. 10 people were injured, all of which occurred in mobile homes.
F1	Belltown	Cleburne	AL	33.57°N 85.63°W	15:30	10 mi (16 km)	50 yd (46 m)	Several trees downed and several structures were damaged.
F1	E of Rock Spring	Walker, Catoosa	GA	34.82°N 85.23°W	15:30–15:35	1.5 mi (2.4 km)	150 yd (140 m)	A tornado moved into the Chickamauga and Chattanooga National Military Park. Generally tree damage occurred along its path, though two cows were killed as well.
F4	SW of Pine Mountain to W of Hickory Flat	Cobb, Cherokee	GA	33.92°N 84.67°W	16:44–17:34	20 mi (32 km)	880 yd (800 m)	This destructive tornado, which may have consisted of twin tornadoes, touched down north of Powder Springs before moving through the northwest Atlanta suburbs, near Marietta, where it leveled homes and trees. The tornado struck and devastated Kennesaw, damaging or destroying more than 325 homes and businesses in the city. A church in Woodstock was destroyed during service, though everyone inside survived. A total of 46 people were injured.
F3	NE of Dahlonega	Lumpkin	GA	34.57°N 83.93°W	18:10–18:25	10 mi (16 km)	880 yd (800 m)	1 death – This tornado caused major damage near Dahlonega. On a large ranch, the tornado damaged or destroyed 40 structures, including offices, cabins, stables, and the lodge. Many hardwood trees were downed as well. One person died from severe head injuries, and seven other people were injured, some of whom were carried 65 to 300 yards (59.4 to 274 m).
F2	SW of Hampton	Spalding, Henry	GA	33.28°N 84.42°W	19:04–19:20	10 mi (16 km)	100 yd (91 m)	About 20 buildings were damaged in Spalding County, and 3 hangars that harbored vintage airplanes were severely damaged too. Three injuries occurred. In Henry County, a few houses were damaged and the wall was blown out of a business. Trees, power poles, and power lines were downed along the tornado's path.
F1	NE of Pimento	Vigo	IN	39.32°N 87.38°W	19:06	0.1 mi (0.16 km)	45 yd (41 m)	Metal sheeting was ripped from several buildings.
F1	W of Box Springs	Muscogee, Talbot	GA	32.53°N 84.72°W	19:35–19:40	2 mi (3.2 km)	50 yd (46 m)	Two homes and a barn were severely damaged; one of the homes was forced to be leveled. A smaller building was lifted 4 feet (1.2 m) off its foundation. The roof was blown off a garage, causing damage to a vehicle inside. Large trees were uprooted; limbs and utility lines were downed.
F3	N of Elletsville	Monroe	IN	39.25°N 86.65°W	19:35–19:44	5.3 mi (8.5 km)	880 yd (800 m)	This tornado destroyed three houses, seven mobile homes, and three barns, with the worst damage being north of Elletsville. The tornado destroyed 135 acres (55 ha) of corn as well. Three people were injured.
F3	Fincastle	Putnam, Montgomery	IN	39.72°N 86.90°W	19:50–20:15	12 mi (19 km)	880 yd (800 m)	This tornado struck about 50 farms, though only a few homes were severely damaged or destroyed.
F3	NE of Paragon to Five Points	Morgan	IN	39.40°N 86.52°W	19:55–20:20	15 mi (24 km)	880 yd (800 m)	An intense tornado first touched down near Hindsville, damaging a meat market. It lifted for a short time before touching down again northwest of Martinsville. It moved along the White River, damaging numerous homes in Centerton and toppling two power line towers. Along the tornado's path, trees were downed.
F1	NE of Raccoon	Montgomery	IN	39.87°N 86.88°W	20:07–20:15	2.5 mi (4.0 km)	200 yd (180 m)	A mobile home was destroyed; the occupant was severely injured.
F0	NW of Coffee Springs	Geneva	AL	31.17°N 85.92°W	20:10	2.2 mi (3.5 km)	20 yd (18 m)	Numerous trees were snapped, and a scoreboard was blown down at a football stadium.
F0	E of Smarr	Monroe	GA	32.98°N 83.87°W	20:40–20:45	0.5 mi (0.80 km)	50 yd (46 m)	A poultry farm and a mobile home were destroyed. A residential home and another mobile home were heavily damaged. Numerous trees were uprooted, and power lines were downed.
F3	Indianapolis to Fishers	Marion	IN	39.87°N 86.12°W	20:45–21:04	9 mi (14 km)	440 yd (400 m)	A total of 200 homes were damaged, of which a few were destroyed; another 24-30 homes sustained major damage. Large trees, as well as 95 feet (29 m) power poles, were downed.
F2	SW of Round Oak	Monroe, Jones	GA	33.03°N 83.80°W	21:00	6 mi (9.7 km)	100 yd (91 m)	A strong tornado impacted areas around Lake Juliette, damaging a building and a park pavilion. South of Juliette, one frame house was destroyed and a second was severely damaged. Seven other houses and trailers, in addition to ten vehicles, were damaged farther along the track. Numerous trees and power lines were downed, particularly in the Piedmont National Wildlife Refuge where stands of hardwood and pine trees were destroyed. Fallen trees blocked U.S. Route 23 and Georgia State Route 11.
F3	W of Shelbyville	Shelby	IN	39.43°N 85.88°W	21:05–21:27	10 mi (16 km)	50 yd (46 m)	Major damage near Shelbyville, where three houses, five barns, and many outbuildings were destroyed. A semi-truck was flipped on I-74.
F0	SE of Smithfield	Henry	KY	38.38°N 85.25°W	21:20	0.5 mi (0.80 km)	20 yd (18 m)	A trailer was destroyed and a barn was damaged.
F2	N of Hardscrabble	Hamilton, Madison	IN	40.02°N 85.88°W	21:20–21:25	2 mi (3.2 km)	100 yd (91 m)	A pole barn was destroyed and a second barn was severely damaged. The top of a silo was blown down. Some corn was damaged, and trees were downed.
F1	NE of Fishers	Hamilton	IN	39.97°N 85.92°W	21:23	1 mi (1.6 km)	100 yd (91 m)	Trees and power lines were downed.
F2	SW of Waynesburg	Bartholomew, Decatur	IN	39.15°N 85.73°W	21:34–21:45	4.9 mi (7.9 km)	50 yd (46 m)	A 98 by 60 feet (30 by 18 m) commercial building was demolished. Two other commercial buildings sustained moderate to severe damage. Ten farm buildings and a barn were destroyed, while ten houses and a farm building were damaged. Numerous power poles and trees were downed, including an apple orchard that was damaged.
F0	SE of Campbellsburg	Henry	KY	38.52°N 85.20°W	21:40	3 mi (4.8 km)	40 yd (37 m)	A small tornado touched down three separate times. It destroyed one barn and damaged another. A house was damaged, and many trees were downed.
F2	N of Gwynneville	Shelby, Hancock, Rush	IN	39.65°N 85.67°W	21:45–22:00	7.5 mi (12.1 km)	50 yd (46 m)	Roofs were damaged or partially removed from several homes and outbuildings. A modular home was blown off its foundation, a metal barn was destroyed, and a shed was downed. Numerous large trees were also downed.
F4	NE of Ethridge to SE of White Plains	Putnam, Greene	GA	33.18°N 83.45°W	21:45–22:20	32 mi (51 km)	880 yd (800 m)	5 deaths – A violent, long-tracked tornado, nearly 1 mile (1.6 km) wide in spots, destroyed extensive swaths of trees. A total of 134 homes and 5 businesses were destroyed. Another 109 homes sustained varying degrees of damage. A total of 4 dairies were lost and another 5 were heavily damaged, resulting in the deaths of about 350 cattle. Five transmission towers were toppled. Along the track, 86 people were injured.
F4	Worthville, KY to NE of Antioch, IN	Carroll (KY), Switzerland (IN), Boone (KY)	KY, IN	38.60°N 85.07°W	21:52	26.7 mi (43.0 km)	75 yd (69 m)	1 death – Well over 40 residential houses and mobile homes were damaged or destroyed by this violent tornado that crossed the Ohio River twice. Two 100 feet (30 m) power transfer structures were twisted to the ground. A semi-trailer was overturned, and many trees were uprooted. Pieces of debris were found up to 5 miles (8.0 km) from the tornado's path. Ten people were injured.
F1	NW of Linwood	Madison	IN	40.20°N 85.68°W	21:54	0.2 mi (0.32 km)	65 yd (59 m)	The roof was ripped off a storage building.
F1	S of Gratz	Owen	KY	38.47°N 84.95°W	22:17	2 mi (3.2 km)	20 yd (18 m)	Two barns and a trailer were destroyed.
F2	Liberty	Union, Wayne	IN	39.60°N 84.98°W	22:35–23:00	12 mi (19 km)	200 yd (180 m)	In total, 2 mobile homes, 6 barns, numerous outbuildings, several garages, and 90 acres (36 ha) of corn were destroyed. The roofs were ripped off many homes and a farmhouse. Many trees were downed.
F1	NW of Cohentown	Wilkes	GA	33.80°N 82.72°W	22:40–22:45	1 mi (1.6 km)	50 yd (46 m)	Two homes were destroyed and several other buildings were damaged. A poultry farm and a hog farm sustained considerable damage. A 3 tonnes (3,000 kg) bin from one location was carried 0.25 miles (0.40 km). Numerous large trees were destroyed, and numerous power lines were downed. One person was injured.
F1	Portland	Jay	IN	40.43°N 84.98°W	23:00	0.2 mi (0.32 km)	6 yd (5.5 m)	A storage shed was destroyed. The roof was ripped off one home, and the roofs of several other homes were damaged.
F3	SE of Campbellstown to S of Arcanum	Preble, Darke	OH	39.78°N 84.75°W	23:00–23:28	20 mi (32 km)	500 yd (460 m)	About 30 buildings were destroyed and another 130 were damaged, particularly in Arcanum. Debris from the city was carried as far as 25 miles (40 km) to the northeast. A total of 21 people were injured.
F3	NE of Amity, GA to W of Jenkinsville, SC	Lincoln (GA), McCormick (SC), Edgefield (SC), Saluda (SC), Newberry (SC)	GA, SC	33.68°N 82.48°W	23:00–01:00	67 mi (108 km)	400 yd (370 m)	1 death – An intense tornado began in Georgia moved northeast into South Carolina. At peak intensity, the tornado destroyed a home, killing one occupant and injuring another. It damaged or destroyed at least two homes in McCormick County, at least one home in Edgefield County, and several homes in Saluda County. In conjunction with a later F2 tornado, 14 homes, 9 mobile homes, and 5 businesses were destroyed in Saluda County. Another 2 homes and 20 mobile homes were damaged in Newberry County, and 1 of those mobile homes was destroyed. A car and a truck parked inside a garage was tossed, and an A-frame house was shifted off its foundation. It is impossible to decipher the exact number of injuries or extent of damage from each two tornadoes that occurred in close proximity. In all, nine people were injured.
F1	S of Eastwood	Brown	OH	39.05°N 83.98°W	23:15	1 mi (1.6 km)	60 yd (55 m)	A tornado heavily damaged or destroyed 10 outbuildings and 3 mobile homes.
F2	N of Johnston to SE of Stoney Hill	Saluda, Newberry	SC	33.88°N 81.83°W	00:00–01:15	30 mi (48 km)	550 yd (500 m)	In conjunction with an earlier F3 tornado, 14 homes, 9 mobile homes, and 5 businesses were destroyed in Saluda County. Another 2 homes and 20 mobile homes were damaged in Newberry County, and 1 of those mobile homes was destroyed. A car and a truck parked inside a garage was tossed, and an A-frame house was shifted off its foundation. It is impossible to decipher the exact number of injuries or extent of damage from each two tornadoes that occurred in close proximity. In all, nine people were injured.
F0	SW of White Oak	Fairfield	SC	34.42°N 81.22°W	01:45	0.6 mi (0.97 km)	—N/a	Numerous trees were downed.
F0	SE of Simpson	Fairfield	SC	34.30°N 81.02°W	02:12	2.7 mi (4.3 km)	—N/a	A tornado touched down near SC Highway 34 and Interstate 77, blowing cars off I-77 and trees and power lines onto both highways. One house was also significantly damaged.
F1	N of Lawndale	Cleveland	NC	35.43°N 81.58°W	03:15–03:23	5 mi (8.0 km)	500 yd (460 m)	A mobile home and three outbuildings were destroyed. Ten other houses were damaged as well.
F1	W of Catawba to NE of Turnersburg	Catawba, Iredell	NC	35.70°N 81.12°W	03:40–04:10	26 mi (42 km)	800 yd (730 m)	A tornado destroyed at least 3 homes and damaged 33 others. Another 2 homes were destroyed and 9 were damaged along the path, but the tornado was intertwined with a swath of microburst wind damage.
F1	N of Courtney to SW of Meadows	Yadkin, Forsyth, Stokes	NC	36.07°N 80.63°W	04:20–05:10	31 mi (50 km)	800 yd (730 m)	A tornado destroyed 11 homes, damaged 149 others, and injured 12 people. Its rating is disputed and ranked F2 by Thomas P. Grazulis.

=== November 23 event ===
List of confirmed tornadoes – Monday, November 23, 1992
F#	Location	County / Parish	State	Start Coord.	Time (UTC)	Path length	Max width	Summary
F1	W of Quinque	Greene	VA	38.23°N 78.42°W	06:05–06:09	3 mi (4.8 km)	35 yd (32 m)	A house trailer was destroyed. Two other houses and two cars were damaged. Trees were knocked down.
F0	S of Aylor	Madison	VA	38.42°N 78.30°W	06:10	0.5 mi (0.80 km)	17 yd (16 m)	The roofs were partially ripped off two homes.
F3	Northwestern Hillsborough	Orange	NC	36.08°N 79.18°W	07:20–07:30	5.5 mi (8.9 km)	1,200 yd (1,100 m)	2 deaths – A significant tornado moved through western and northern sections of Hillsborough, destroying 1 business and 53 homes. Another business and 109 homes were damaged. Ten people were injured.
F1	Hillcrest Heights	Prince George's	MD	38.83°N 76.95°W	09:00	1.03 mi (1.66 km)	30 yd (27 m)	The roofs of a store and a large building were damaged. A number of 12 by 15 feet (3.7 by 4.6 m) doors were blown down, and a tractor trailer was pushed into an adjacent building. Power poles, transformers, and other equipment were damaged. Trees were broken.
F1	W of Ruthville	Charles City	VA	37.37°N 77.08°W	09:00–09:04	2 mi (3.2 km)	25 yd (23 m)	Three metal sheds were destroyed, while a house and a car sustained minor damage. Numerous trees were downed or uprooted.
F3	N of Barclaysville to N of Elizabeth City	Harnett, Johnston, Wilson, Edgecombe, Martin, Bertie, Chowan, Pasquotank	NC	35.47°N 78.68°W	09:10–12:25	160 mi (260 km)	100 yd (91 m)	An exceptionally long-tracked tornado, the longest track on record in North Carolina, remained on the ground for over three hours across 160 miles (260 km) and nine counties. It moved across generally rural areas, particularly further east along its track, but the tornado's path was evident in tree damage and ground scouring via an aerial survey. In all, 40 houses, 4 chicken houses, and 1 business were demolished. Another 178 homes and 1 business were damaged. A total of 49 people were injured, especially near Elizabeth City when a 28,000 pounds (13,000 kg) school bus carrying students was thrown 75 yards (69 m), injuring 21 occupants. Grazulis notes that this tornado may have instead been a tornado family that was improperly surveyed by unexperienced surveyors.

=== Hopewell–Florence–Pine Tree–Weir, Mississippi ===
Hopewell–Florence–Pine Tree–Weir, Mississippi
F4 tornado
- on the Fujita scale

Overall effects
- Fatalities: 12
- Injuries: 122

This devastating, long-tracked, violent tornado began near Hopewell and moved northeast across Copiah and Simpson Counties, downing numerous trees as it moved toward the Jackson area. The tornado entered Rankin County and struck the south side of Florence as it moved through a mobile home park at that location. Several homes and mobile homes were destroyed in Florence, and two people were killed. The tornado exited Florence and struck another mobile home park, killing four more people. The tornado then tore directly through the Jackson suburb of Brandon, where numerous homes and 30 mobile homes were destroyed. Large and well-built brick homes were destroyed in the Easthaven Subdivision of Brandon, including a massive, well-constructed, brick mansion that was completely leveled, killing four people, one of whom was found .25 miles (0.40 km) from the foundation. In Rankin County alone, a total of 60 homes were destroyed, over 500 homes were damaged. 10 people died in Rankin County, where the tornado attained its peak intensity. The tornado moved into Scott County, downing numerous trees and power lines. The tornado also damaged several homes in the town of Ludlow. The tornado then crossed into Leake County and struck the community of Pine Tree, where one person was killed in a mobile home. Three homes were destroyed and nine others were damaged in Leake County, and 26 chicken houses and several outbuildings were also destroyed. In neighboring Attala County, 36 homes were severely damaged or destroyed. The tornado then crossed into Choctaw County and struck Weir, where one person was killed in a mobile home. A total of 101 homes were damaged or destroyed in Choctaw County before the tornado dissipated. Extensive tree damage occurred along the entire path length—including thousands of uprooted trees—and 122 people were injured. Eight of the 12 deaths were in mobile homes.

=== Channelview, Texas ===
Channelview, Texas
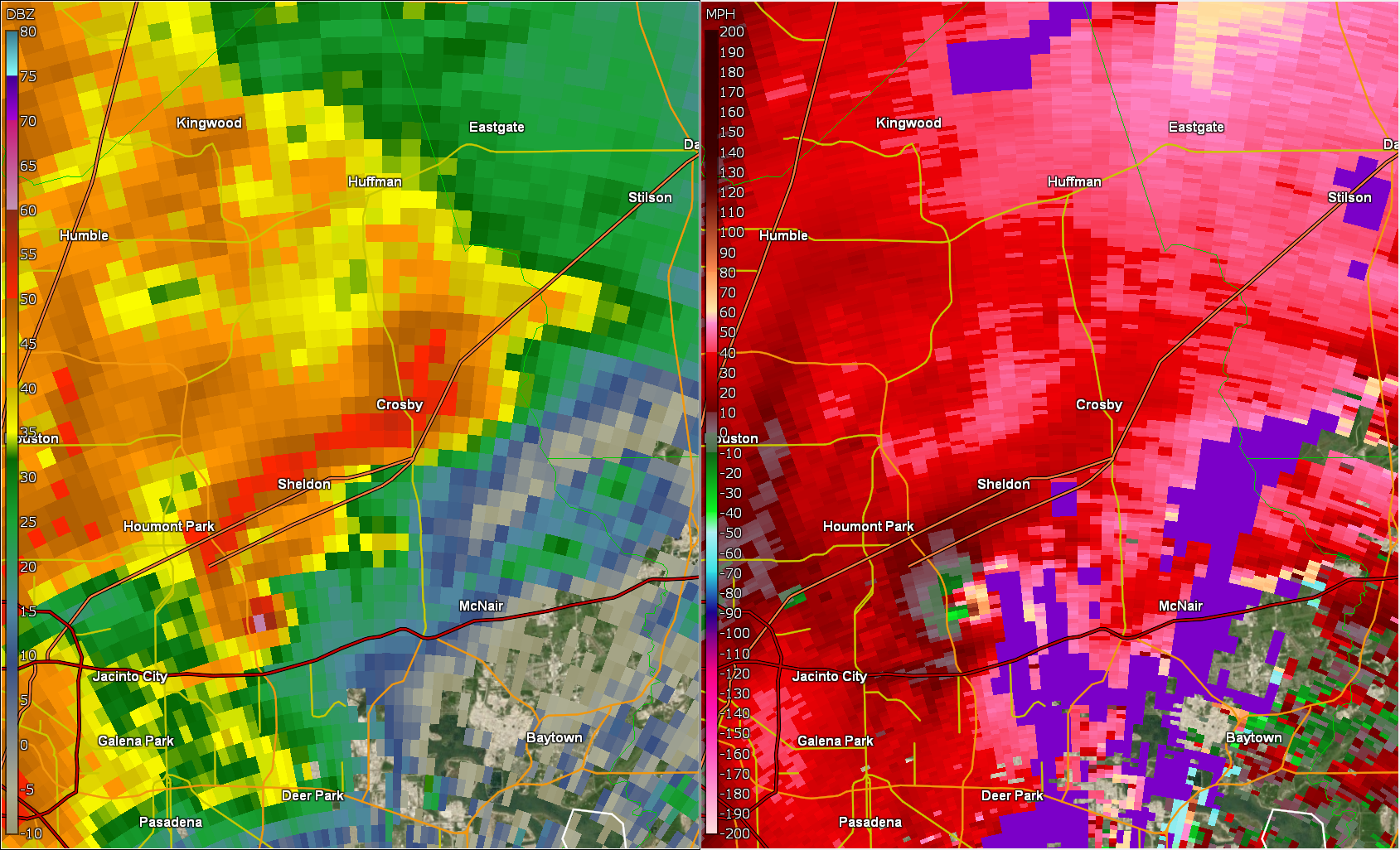
- NEXRAD radar scan of the Channelview, Texas F4 tornado

F4 tornado
- on the Fujita scale
- Highest winds: ~200 miles per hour (320 km/h)

This tornado first touched down near the Houston Ship Channel, snapping trees in a wooded area. The tornado then rapidly intensified and widened to 1 mile (1.6 km) shortly after touching down, reaching F4 intensity as it moved through several subdivisions in the Channelview area, where the most severe damage occurred. A total of 271 homes were heavily damaged or destroyed, and 14 were left with no walls standing. The tornado crossed the San Jacinto River before dissipating near Dayton. The tornado did not cause any fatalities, but it did injure 15 people. It was one of only two recorded F4 tornadoes in Greater Houston, the other having hit Galveston on September 12, 1961.

== See also ==
- List of North American tornadoes and tornado outbreaks
- 1974 Super Outbreak
- Tornado outbreak of November 17, 2013
