= Lavina Eastlick =

Pioneer woman and captive of Native Americans (1833–1923)

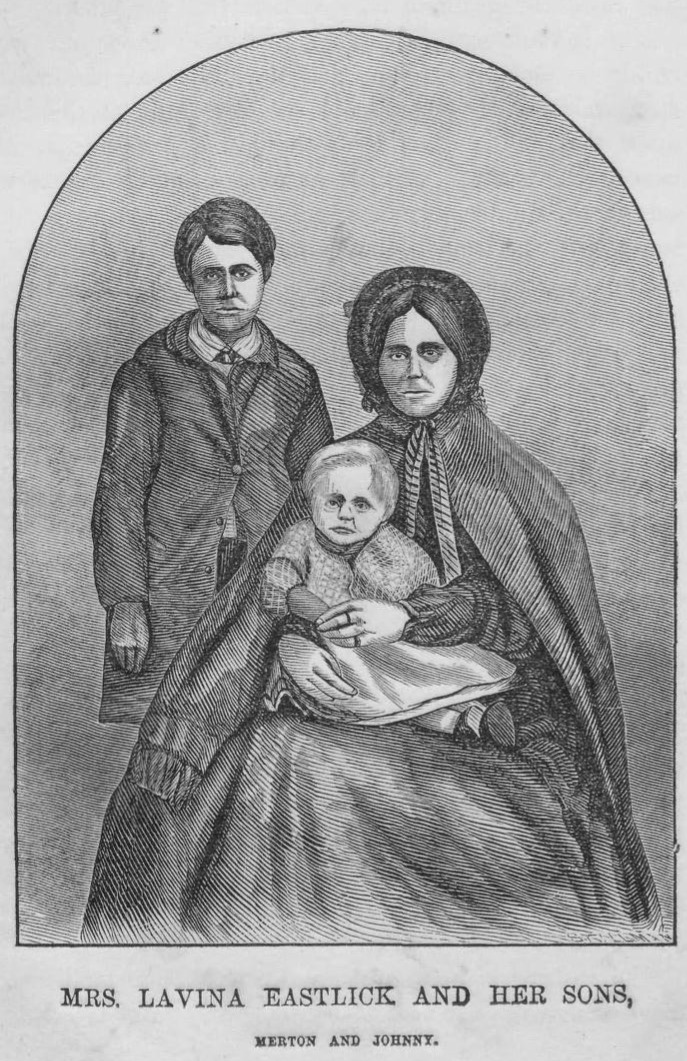
- Eastlick with her sons Merton (left) and Johnny (center)
- Born: Lavina Day; May 28, 1833; Broome County, New York, U.S.
- Died: October 9, 1923 (aged 90); Lougheed, Alberta, Canada
- Known for: Survivor of the Lake Shetek Massacre

Lavina Eastlick (née: Day) (May 28, 1833 – October 9, 1923), was an American pioneer, writer, and survivor of the Lake Shetek Massacre in Murray County, Minnesota. Eastlick and members of her family were later captives of the Dakota people during the Dakota War of 1862 who were later released from captivity following the Surrender at Camp Release. Later in 1864 Eastlick published a narrative booklet Thrilling Incidents in the Indian War of 1862: A Personal Narrative of the Outrages and Horrors Witnessed by Mrs. L. Eastlick, in Minnesota which gives a detailed account of the Dakota War and her period of captivity, she was also featured as an eyewitness to the conflict in several historical narratives.

== Early life, capture, and captivity ==
Lavina Day was born on May 28, 1833, in Broome County, New York, at a young age her family moved to Trumbull County, Ohio. She married John Easlick in 1850 before moving to Indiana and later Illinois, eventually settling at Lake Shetek in modern-day Murray County, Minnesota in 1861.

=== The Lake Shetek massacre ===
At the beginning of the Dakota War of 1862 the Eastlick family lived along the shores of Lake Shetek alongside eleven families of White settlers and European emigrants roughly 65 miles west of New Ulm, Minnesota. The Lake Shetek Massacre occurred on August 20, 1862, just two days after the Attack at the Lower Sioux Agency. The Eastlick family was one of the first families warned about the killings near the settlement and quickly joined a party which would attempt to flee Lake Shetek to New Ulm, Minnesota which had been attacked by the Dakota just one day earlier. The first people killed at the settlement were members of the Meyers family at the head of Lake Shetek, followed by John Voight (also spelled as Voigt), one of the Meyers hired laborers. Some of the members of the Koch family (pronounced Cook) and members of the Duley family were also later killed. William Duley, the family's father, survived the massacre and was later the chosen executioner in the 1862 Mankato mass execution. A total of fifteen settlers from the wagon party fled Lake Shetek were killed in a slough which later became known as the "slaughter slough", eight others were taken as hostages. John Eastlick was one of the family members who were killed at the slough, others include Eastlick's sons Frank, Giles, and Frederick.

=== Captivity ===
Lavina was taken as a captive alongside several others, primarily women, and taken to western Minnesota under the protection of a neutral Dakota Chief, Chief Mazasha (English: Red Iron), and was later released from captivity at Camp Release to soldiers under the command of General Henry Hastings Sibley. Lavina later published several narratives about her time with the Dakota as a captive, one of which was featured in the book A History Of The Great Massacre By The Sioux Indians, In Minnesota: Including The Personal Narratives Of Many Who Escaped by Charles S. Bryant.

== Later life ==
Following her captivity Lavina temporarily lived in Grant County, Wisconsin. Lavina died at her daughters home in Lougheed, Alberta on October 9, 1923.
