= The Lakes, Minnesota =

Unincorporated community in Minnesota, US

The Lakes
- Census-designated place (CDP) and Unincorporated community
- Location within Murray County and the state of Minnesota
- Coordinates: 44°07′29″N 95°42′07″W
- Country: United States
- State: Minnesota
- County: Murray
- Townships: Lake Sarah; Shetek; Mason; Murray

Area
  - Total: 43.46 sq mi (112.55 km^{2})
  - Land: 33.70 sq mi (87.28 km^{2})
  - Water: 9.76 sq mi (25.27 km^{2})
- Elevation: 1,483 ft (452 m)

Population (2020)
  - Total: 590
  - Density: 17.5/sq mi (6.76/km^{2})
- Time zone: UTC-6 (Central (CST))
  - Summer (DST): UTC-5 (CDT)
- ZIP Codes: 56132 (Garvin); 56175 (Tracy); 56172 (Slayton); 56123 (Currie)
- FIPS code: 27-64543
- GNIS feature ID: 2393255

The Lakes is an unincorporated community and census-designated place (CDP) in Murray County, Minnesota, United States located north of Currie and south of Garvin. The population was 590 at the 2020 census. The community is centered about Lake Shetek, the largest lake in southwestern Minnesota. The lake and the community are located in parts of four townships in Murray County: Lake Sarah, Shetek, Murray, and Mason.

== Geography ==
The Lakes is in northern Murray County and extends north to the Lyon County line. The CDP includes all of Lake Shetek, as well as Lake Sarah and Lake Maria in the west. Several smaller lakes in the CDP are near Lake Shetek. According to the U.S. Census Bureau, the CDP has a total area of 43.4 square miles (112 km^{2}), of which 33.7 square miles (87 km^{2}) are land and 9.8 square miles (25 km^{2}), or 22.45%, are water. The outlet of Lake Shetek, at the southern end of the community, is the Des Moines River, flowing southward toward Iowa.

The unincorporated community of Owanka is in the eastern part of The Lakes, on the eastern shore of Lake Shetek. Lake Shetek State Park is on the southeast side of the lake.

U.S. Highway 59 runs through the western side of the CDP, leading south 10 miles (16 km) to Slayton, the Murray county seat, and north 23 miles (37 km) to Marshall. Minnesota State Highway 30 runs along the southern edge of the CDP, leading east toward Currie and Dovray.

== Demographics ==
Historical population
Census	Pop.	Note	%±
2000	619		—
2010	667		7.8%
2020	590		−11.5%
U.S. Decennial Census

As of the census of 2000, there were 619 people, 267 households, and 213 families residing in the CDP. The population density was 17.3 people per square mile (6.7/km^{2}). There were 598 housing units at an average density of 16.7/sq mi (6.4/km^{2}). The racial makeup of the CDP was 99.35% White, 0.16% Native American, and 0.48% from two or more races. Hispanic or Latino of any race were 0.16% of the population.

There were 267 households, out of which 19.1% had children under the age of 18 living with them, 76.8% were married couples living together, 2.2% had a female householder with no husband present, and 20.2% were non-families. 16.1% of all households were made up of individuals, and 3.7% had someone living alone who was 65 years of age or older. The average household size was 2.32 and the average family size was 2.59.

In the CDP, the population was spread out, with 16.6% under the age of 18, 3.9% from 18 to 24, 21.3% from 25 to 44, 42.6% from 45 to 64, and 15.5% who were 65 years of age or older. The median age was 49 years. For every 100 females, there were 107.7 males. For every 100 females age 18 and over, there were 107.2 males.

The median income for a household in the CDP was $43,250, and the median income for a family was $50,357. Males had a median income of $36,250 versus $22,083 for females. The per capita income for the CDP was $23,980. None of the families and 0.8% of the population were living below the poverty line, including no under eighteens and none of those over 64.

== Politics ==
The Lakes is located in Minnesota's 1st congressional district, most recently represented by Republican Jim Hagedorn of Blue Earth until his death in 2022. At the state level, The Lakes is located in Senate District 22, represented by Republican Doug Magnus, and in House District 22A, represented by Republican Joe Schomacker.
