= Casey Jones State Trail =

Rail trail in Minnesota, U.S.

Coordinates: 44°0′9.1″N 96°18′24.51″W

- Length: 19 miles (31 km) (discontinuous)
- Location: Southwestern Minnesota, USA
- Designation: Minnesota state trail
- Trailheads: Pipestone; Lake Wilson; Lake Shetek State Park; Currie
- Use: Biking, hiking, snowmobiling Partial: horseback riding, in-line skating
- Grade: Mostly level
- Season: Year-round
- Sights: Buffalo Ridge, glacial landforms, Lake Shetek, pioneer and railroad history
- Hazards: Severe weather
- Surface: Part asphalt, part natural
- Website: Casey Jones State Trail

The Casey Jones State Trail is a multi-use recreational rail trail in southwestern Minnesota, USA. Although it was one of the first Minnesota state trails to be established, it remains incomplete as three discontinuous sections. The trail is managed by the Minnesota Department of Natural Resources. It traverses the rolling morainal landscape of the Coteau des Prairies, passing cropland interspersed with wooded ravines, remnant tallgrass prairie, and wetlands. The trail is named after railroad engineer Casey Jones, who famously sacrificed his life to lessen the severity of a 1900 train crash in Mississippi. Jones had no connections to Minnesota; the trail was named for him as it was the first abandoned railroad grade acquired by the state. The railroad was key to bringing settlers to the area in the late 19th century and for shipping their agricultural products to market.

== Description ==
The Casey Jones State Trail is currently limited to three separate sections. The first section runs from the city of Pipestone due east for 13 miles (21 km) to the Pipestone/Murray county line. After a 4-mile (6.4 km) gap the trail resumes for a 1.5-mile (2.4 km) section leading into the town of Lake Wilson. These two sections have a natural surface. The third portion is a paved 6-mile (9.7 km) loop between End-O-Line Railroad Park & Museum in Currie and Lake Shetek State Park. The full plan for the trail is a route from Split Rock Creek State Park to Pipestone to Lake Wilson to Slayton to Lake Shetek State Park to Walnut Grove. A spur would provide access to Pipestone National Monument. The plan calls for parallel tracks, one paved and one natural-surfaced, to accommodate horseback riding and snowmobiling as well as biking, in-line skating, and cross-country skiing.

== History ==
The Casey Jones State Trail was authorized in the late 1960s shortly after legislation was passed allowing for state trails in Minnesota. The original route was to follow the abandoned railroad grade and then sweep northeast through Slayton to Lake Shetek State Park. No further property was acquired, however, and only the 13-mile (21 km) section from Pipestone was developed, opening in the mid-1970s.

In 1993 Murray County secured federal funds through the Intermodal Surface Transportation Efficiency Act to build the paved loop from Currie to the state park, which was completed in 1996. The following year a local group secured a key .5-mile (0.80 km) segment leading into Lake Wilson, and that section was soon opened for hiking.

The popularity of the paved loop helped renew public interest in the trail. The 2002 Minnesota Legislature officialized the loop as part of the state trail and authorized a 30-mile (48 km) extension to the main route. However a second bill to provide funding did not pass and a small appropriation was vetoed by the governor.
