= Lake Sarah =

Lake Sarah may refer to:

== Cities, towns, townships etc. ==
- Lake Sarah Township, Minnesota in Murray County, Minnesota

== Lakes ==
- Lake Sarah, a lake in Murray County, Minnesota
- Lake Sarah, a lake in Polk County, Minnesota
- Lake Sarah, a lake in the Hunter Island region of the Quetico Provincial Park, Ontario, Canada
