= Owanka =

Owanka may refer to:

- Owanka, Minnesota, unincorporated community, United States
- Owanka, South Dakota, unincorporated community, United States
