= William Duley =

American Civil War officer (1819–1898)

Captain William J. Duley
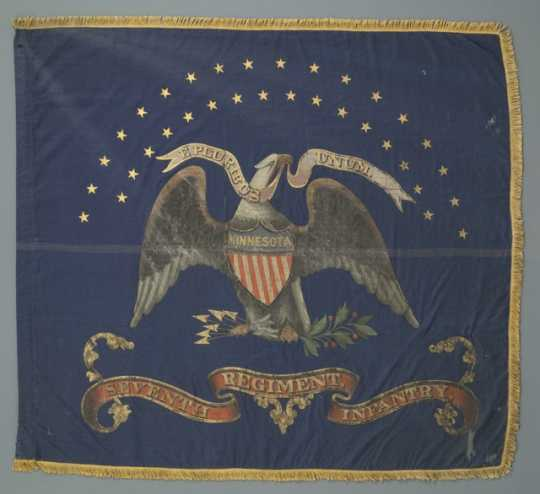
- 7th Minnesota Infantry Regiment battle flag
- Born: March 30, 1819; Ripley County, Indiana
- Died: March 5, 1898 (aged 78); Washington, U.S.
- Burial place: Artondale Cemetery, Gig Harbor, Washington
- Military career
- Allegiance: United States of America; Union
- Branch: (United States) Union Army
- Service years: 1862–1865
- Rank: Captain
- Unit: 7th Minnesota Infantry Regiment
- Commands: Company B, 7th Minnesota Infantry Regiment (attached); United States Army Indian Scouts
- Known for: Slaughter Slough; 1862 Mankato mass execution
- Conflicts: Dakota War of 1862: Battle of Wood Lake; Sibley's 1863 Campaign: Battle of Big Mound; Battle of Dead Buffalo Lake; Battle of Stony Lake

William J. Duley (March 30, 1819 – March 5, 1898) was an American Civil War officer and American pioneer from Indiana who settled land near Lake Shetek in Murray County, Minnesota. During the Dakota War of 1862 several of Duley's family members were killed during the Lake Shetek Massacre by the Dakota. Duley is noted as later being the executioner during the 1862 Mankato hangings following the Dakota Uprising.

== Early life ==
Duley was born on March 30, 1819, in Ripley County, Indiana. Duley moved to Iowa in 1847 where he married his wife, Laura Terry (1828–1900) in 1848. Duley then moved to Winona County, Minnesota, in 1856 shortly after their two children, Emily and Ellen, drowned in the Mississippi River. Duley was the proprietor of a farm and sawmill and in 1857 he became an elected Republican delegate at the Minnesota State Constitutional Convention in 1857 representing District 9. Four years later, he and his family moved west to Lake Shetek, a remote settlement in northern Murray County, Minnesota.

The first homesteaders arrived at Lake Shetek in 1855. By 1862 at least 9 families had cabins spread along 5 miles (8.0 km) of lakeshore. Listed roughly north to south they were; the Meyers, the Hurds, the Kochs, the Irelands, the Eastlicks, the Duleys, the Smiths, the Wrights, and the Everetts. There were also a few single men. Prior to the hostilities with the Dakota, the settlers had traded with the local eastern Dakota people, some of which spoke passably in the Dakota language.

== Lake Shetek Massacre ==
On the morning of Wednesday, August 20, 1862, two days after the Attack at the Lower Sioux Agency, 25–30 Sisseton warriors and women entered the settlement at Lake Shetek unopposed from the north led by Chief Lean Bear of the Sleepy-Eye band of the Dakota who were set on either killing the settlers of Lake Shetek or taking hostages back with them into the Dakota Territory.

The events which later became known as the Lake Shetek Massacre lasted several hours, several of the settlers who fled the attacks with Duley took cover in a slough, where many of them were either wounded, killed, or captured. As a result of the attack, 15 settlers were killed, while 3 women and 8 children were taken captive. 21 settlers escaped to safety of Mankato, Minnesota, William J. Duley being among them.

Although Duley had escaped with his life, he had two gunshot wounds to his left arm. Additionally, three of Duley's children; Willie (10), Belle (4), and Franklin (6 months) were all killed, his wife Laura was taken as a hostage along with his son Jefferson and his daughter Emma. Duley's family members were later released from captivity at the Surrender at Camp Release at the very end of the Dakota Uprising.

== Mankato hangings ==
Duley decided to join the Union army as a scout and guide shortly after escaping the attack with his life. In Mankato he enlisted into the ranks of the 7th Minnesota Infantry Regiment as a civilian and assisted in the erection of the massive gallows built in Mankato to execute 38 of the original 400+ Dakota men who had been accused to participating in the Dakota Uprising. According to the University of Oklahoma College of Law:

"Immediately upon recovering from his wounds sufficiently to enable him to do so. Captain Duley volunteered his services as scout in the campaign undertaken by General Sibley, to punish the Sioux for their outrages previously recited. General Sibley accepted Captain Duley's offer, and he proved to be both brave and sagacious, and as a recognition of the distinguished services rendered by Captain Duley, and to afford him the personal gratification of bearing a personal part in the punishment inflicted upon the savages through whom he had suffered so cruelly, both in person and in his family, he was ordered to superintend the details of the execution of the thirty-eight Indians who were hanged at Mankato, December 26, 1862, and the murderers were hanged under his immediate supervision".

Duley was given the opportunity to be the executioner of the 38 Dakota men who were accused of taking part in the Dakota Uprising in Mankato, Minnesota. On December 26, 1862, Duley, along with a crowd of 250+ people and a guard of 1,400 soldiers were witnesses to the largest mass execution in American history, with Duley being the rope cutter. At 10:00am Duley cut the rope holding up the gallows with an axe, killing the 38 Dakota men all simultaneously. The Mankato hangings are noted as being the largest singular mass execution in Minnesota and United States history.

== Military career ==
Duley served as a captain in the United States Army Indian Scouts attached to Company B of the 7th Minnesota Infantry Regiment during the Battle of Wood Lake and later during Sibley's 1863 Campaign under Brigadier General Henry Hastings Sibley against the Dakota people. During the Dakota War and subsequent campaigns the 7th Minnesota fought at the Battle of Wood Lake, the Battle of Big Mound, the Battle of Dead Buffalo Lake, and the Battle of Stony Lake. Because Duley was never formally enrolled into the Minnesota muster rolls as an enlisted man or officer, he was not entitled to a military pension under the general laws of Minnesota, he was later granted a pension by the 50th United States Congress.

== Later life ==
In the 1870s, Duley, Laura, and his two remaining children moved to Alabama, where William worked as a millwright. According to reports, Laura was quite unwell in the aftermath of her captivity and was said to have never smiled again. Later in his life Duley and his wife Laura followed their son Jefferson Duley (1856–1937) to Washington state, where Jefferson became police chief in Tacoma and his father worked as a carpenter. William and Laura Duley are buried in Artondale Cemetery in Gig Harbor, Washington. He died on March 5, 1898. Laura Duley died two years later at the age of 72, on March 2, 1900.

== Controversial legacy ==
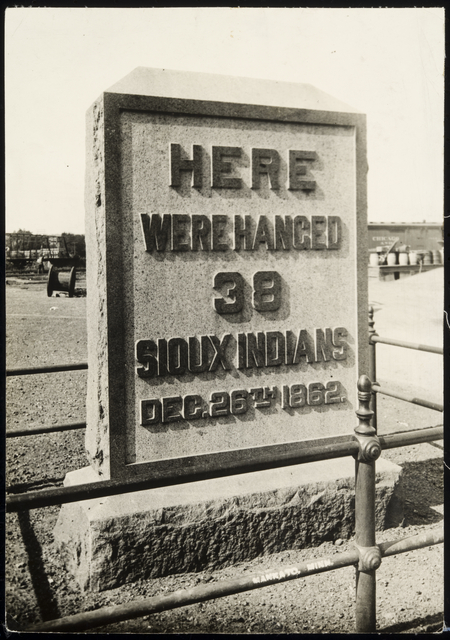
Monument indicating where the thirty-eight Dakota were hanged following the U.S.–Dakota War of 1862 in Mankato, Minnesota. The memorial was placed in 1912 and was removed in 1971.

Duley holds a controversial legacy within the confines of Minnesota history and specifically within the confines of the Lake Shetek Massacre, the 1862 Mankato mass execution, and the general history of the Dakota War of 1862. Local Brown County researcher Curtis Dahlin described Duley as a "opportunistic self-promoter" of his time. Dahlin specifically takes issue with Duley's ability to escape the Lake Shetek raid while his family members died or were captured in the process. Dahlin stated in an interview with the Star Tribune that Duley "was a politician and they are never shrinking violets - I'm not sure how he was selected to cut the rope at the execution, but I suspect he let his interest in the job become known."
