= Walnut Grove, Minnesota =

City in Minnesota, United States

- City
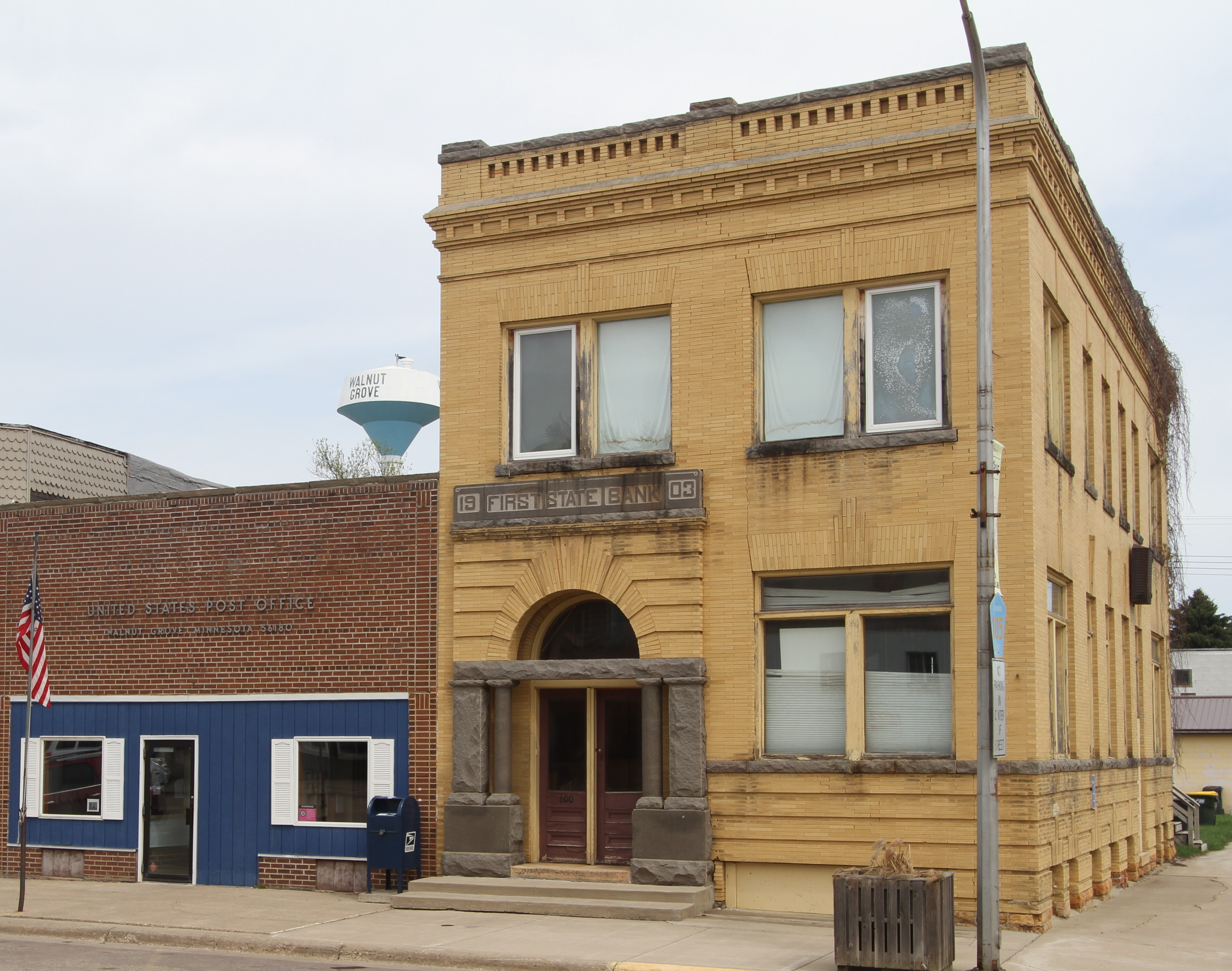
- U.S. Post Office, First State Bank Building, and water tower in Walnut Grove

- Location of Walnut Grove, Minnesota
- Coordinates: 44°13′30″N 95°28′09″W
- Country: United States
- State: Minnesota
- County: Redwood
- Founded: 1874
- Incorporated: 1879

Government
  - Mayor: Ron Stubbe

Area
  - Total: 1.09 sq mi (2.82 km^{2})
  - Land: 1.09 sq mi (2.82 km^{2})
  - Water: 0 sq mi (0.00 km^{2})
- Elevation: 1,211 ft (369 m)

Population (2020)
  - Total: 751
  - Density: 688.7/sq mi (265.89/km^{2})
- Time zone: UTC-6 (Central (CST))
  - Summer (DST): UTC-5 (CDT)
- ZIP code: 56180
- Area code: 507
- FIPS code: 27-67846
- GNIS feature ID: 2397182
- Website: www.walnutgrovemn.org

Walnut Grove is a city in Redwood County, Minnesota, United States. The population was 751 at the 2020 census. Another name formerly associated with the area is Walnut Station.

== History ==
In 1862, a massacre occurred at Lake Shetek that became known as Slaughter Slough. One of the survivors, Henry W. Smith, escaped and made his way to Walnut Grove to warn the village. A John Renniker was killed Northeast of Walnut Grove and is included with those that died at the slough.

Walnut Grove was platted in 1874. It was named for a grove of black walnut trees near the original town site. It was incorporated in 1879.

Walnut Grove gained more than 250 Hmong residents between 2001 and 2006. This increased the population to nearly 900. In 2004, Hmong people were 25% of the town.

=== Little House ===
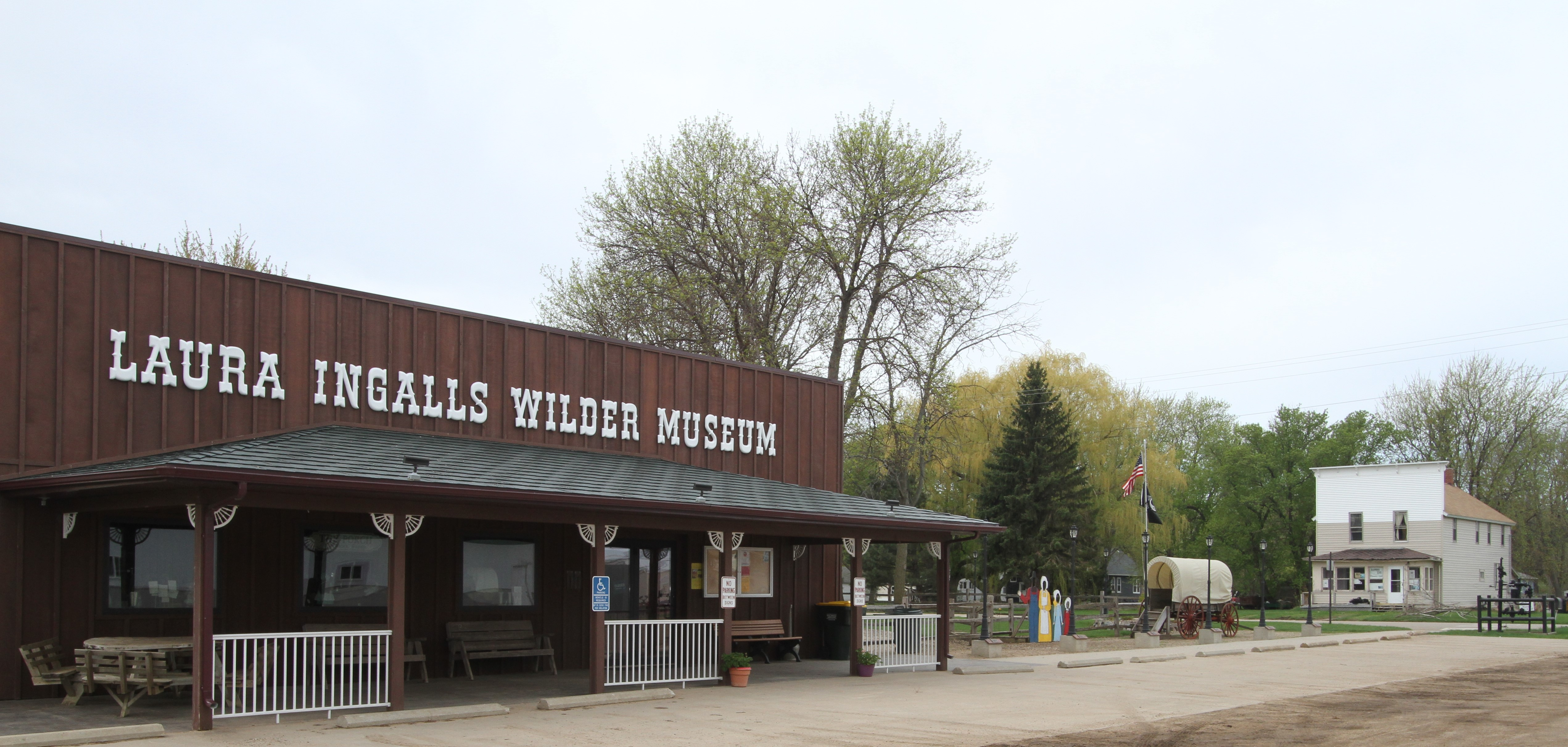
Laura Ingalls Wilder Museum in Walnut Grove

Walnut Grove is the site of the Laura Ingalls Wilder Museum, dedicated to the author of the Little House on the Prairie books. Wilder and her family lived in the area for a part of her childhood and the location is the setting for the Plum Creek part of the Little House book series. Charles Ingalls, her father, was the community's first justice and her brother, Charles Frederick "Freddy" Ingalls (November 1, 1875 – August 27, 1876), was born in Walnut Grove. The name "Walnut Grove" was also used in the Little House on the Prairie television series, although the program was filmed in California.

== Geography ==
According to the United States Census Bureau, the city has a total area of 1.06 square miles (2.75 km^{2}), all land.

Walnut Grove lies along U.S. Route 14, which connects it with Tracy to the west and Revere to the east. The town is located on Plum Creek.

== Demographics ==
Historical population
Census	Pop.	Note	%±
1880	153		—
1890	127		−17.0%
1900	447		252.0%
1910	366		−18.1%
1920	663		81.1%
1930	586		−11.6%
1940	753		28.5%
1950	890		18.2%
1960	886		−0.4%
1970	756		−14.7%
1980	753		−0.4%
1990	625		−17.0%
2000	599		−4.2%
2010	871		45.4%
2020	751		−13.8%
U.S. Decennial Census

=== 2010 census ===
At the 2010 census, the city had 871 people, 313 households and 210 families. The population density was 821.7 per square mile (317.3/km^{2}). There were 367 housing units at an average density of 346.2 per square mile (133.7/km^{2}). The city's racial make-up was 63.4% White, 0.5% Native American, 35.0% Asian, 1.0% from other races and 0.1% from two or more races. Hispanic or Latino of any race were 2.1% of the population.

There were 313 households, of which 30.7% had children under the age of 18 living with them, 55.9% were married couples living together, 6.7% had a female householder with no husband present, 4.5% had a male householder with no wife present and 32.9% were non-families. 30.0% of all households were made up of individuals, and 17.9% had someone living alone who was 65 years of age or older. The average household size was 2.78 and the average family size was 3.53.

The median age was 36.8 years. 31.3% of the city's population was under age 18; 7.9% was from age 18 to 24, 18.3% was from age 25 to 44, 23.1% was from age 45 to 64 and 19.3% was age 65 or older. The city's sex make-up was 50.3% male and 49.7% female.

=== 2000 census ===
At the 2000 census, the city had 599 people, 291 households and 178 families. The population density was 577.7 per square mile (223.1/km^{2}). There were 341 housing units at an average density of 328.9 per square mile (127.0/km^{2}). The city's racial make-up was 97.66% White, 0.67% African American, 0.17% Native American, 0.17% Asian, 1.17% Pacific Islander and 0.17% from two or more races. Hispanic or Latino of any race were 0.17% of the population.

There were 291 households, of which 21.3% had children under the age of 18 living with them, 53.3% were married couples living together, 6.5% had a female householder with no husband present, and 38.8% were non-families. 36.4% of all households were made up of individuals and 22.7% had someone living alone who was 65 years of age or older. The average household size was 2.06 and the average family size was 2.67.

19.4% of the city's population was under age 18, 6.5% was from age 18 to 24, 22.7% was from age 25 to 44, 22.7% was from age 45 to 64 and 28.7% was age 65 or older. The median age was 46 years. For every 100 females, there were 89.6 males. For every 100 females age 18 and over, there were 90.2 males.

The city's median household income was $24,013 and the median family income was $34,167. Males had a median income of $24,750 and females $20,192. The per capita income was $15,637. About 5.0% of families and 9.6% of the population were below the poverty line, including 13.2% of those under age 18 and 10.1% of those age 65 or over.

== Education ==
In the late 1990s, the Westbrook Wildcats and the Walnut Grove Loggers combined school districts and sports teams to form the Westbrook-Walnut Grove Chargers.

- Schools: one high school in Westbrook (Grades 7–12) and one elementary school in Walnut Grove (Grades K–6)
- Mascot: Chargers
- School colors: Red and silver

== Notable people ==
- Norman R. DeBlieck, farmer and Minnesota state legislator
- Lester Mondale, Unitarian minister
- Leo K. Thorsness, Medal of Honor recipient
- Laura Ingalls Wilder, author
