= Shetek Township, Murray County, Minnesota =

Shetek Township, Minnesota
- Township
- Location within the state of Minnesota Shetek Township, Minnesota (the United States)
- Coordinates: 44°9′9″N 95°38′17″W
- Country: United States
- State: Minnesota
- County: Murray

Area
  - Total: 35.5 sq mi (91.9 km^{2})
  - Land: 31.1 sq mi (80.5 km^{2})
  - Water: 4.4 sq mi (11.4 km^{2})
- Elevation: 1,480 ft (451 m)

Population (2000)
  - Total: 313
  - Density: 10/sq mi (3.9/km^{2})
- Time zone: UTC-6 (Central (CST))
  - Summer (DST): UTC-5 (CDT)
- FIPS code: 27-59764
- GNIS feature ID: 0665596

Shetek Township is a township in Murray County, Minnesota, United States. The population was 313 at the 2000 census. It contains part of the census-designated place of The Lakes.

Shetek Township was organized in 1872.

== Geography ==
According to the United States Census Bureau, the township has a total area of 35.5 square miles (91.9 km^{2}), of which 31.1 square miles (80.5 km^{2}) is land and 4.4 square miles (11.4 km^{2}) (12.43%) is water.

== Demographics ==
As of the census of 2000, there were 313 people, 127 households, and 99 families residing in the township. The population density was 10.1 people per square mile (3.9/km^{2}). There were 272 housing units at an average density of 8.8/sq mi (3.4/km^{2}). The racial makeup of the township was 99.04% White, 0.32% Native American, and 0.64% from two or more races. Hispanic or Latino of any race were 0.32% of the population.

There were 127 households, out of which 22.8% had children under the age of 18 living with them, 75.6% were married couples living together, 2.4% had a female householder with no husband present, and 22.0% were non-families. 18.1% of all households were made up of individuals, and 7.1% had someone living alone who was 65 years of age or older. The average household size was 2.46 and the average family size was 2.82.

In the township the population was spread out, with 18.2% under the age of 18, 7.7% from 18 to 24, 21.4% from 25 to 44, 38.0% from 45 to 64, and 14.7% who were 65 years of age or older. The median age was 46 years. For every 100 females, there were 117.4 males. For every 100 females age 18 and over, there were 116.9 males.

The median income for a household in the township was $40,357, and the median income for a family was $41,071. Males had a median income of $27,778 versus $23,333 for females. The per capita income for the township was $25,683. None of the families and 2.1% of the population were living below the poverty line, including no under eighteens and none of those over 64.

== Politics ==
Shetek Township is located in Minnesota's 1st congressional district, represented by Mankato educator Tim Walz, a Democrat. At the state level, Shetek Township is located in Senate District 22, represented by Republican Doug Magnus, and in House District 22A, represented by Republican Joe Schomacker.
