= Norman R. DeBlieck =

American politician (1926–2021)

Member of the Minnesota House of Representatives from the 27A district
- In office January 5, 1987 – January 1, 1989

Personal details
- Born: December 20, 1926 near Walnut Grove, Minnesota, U.S.
- Died: December 24, 2021 (aged 95) Slayton, Minnesota, U.S.
- Party: Democratic (DFL)
- Spouse: Edith Ann
- Children: 7
- Occupation: Politician, farmer

Norman R. DeBlieck (December 20, 1926 – December 24, 2021) was an American farmer and politician.

DeBlieck was born on a farm near Walnut Grove, Minnesota. He went to school in Lyon County, Minnesota and served in the Minnesota National Guard from 1950 to 1952. Deblieck was a farmer and lived in Tracy, Minnesota with his wife and family. DeBlieck served in the Minnesota House of Representatives in 1987 and 1989 and was a Democrat. He died at the Hospice of Murray County in Slayton, Minnesota.
