= Owanka, Minnesota =

- Unincorporated community
- Location within Minnesota Location within the United States
- Coordinates: 44°07′34″N 95°40′33″W
- Country: United States
- State: Minnesota
- County: Murray
- Township: Murray
- Elevation: 1,503 ft (458 m)
- Time zone: UTC-6 (Central (CST))
  - Summer (DST): UTC-5 (CDT)
- Area code: 507
- GNIS feature ID: 654866

Owanka is an unincorporated community in Murray Township, Murray County, Minnesota, United States. It is within the census-designated place of The Lakes.
