= Artondale, Washington =

- CDP
- Interactive map of Artondale, Washington
- Coordinates: 47°18′0″N 122°37′45″W
- Country: United States
- State: Washington
- County: Pierce

Area
  - Total: 13.8 sq mi (35.8 km^{2})
  - Land: 13.38 sq mi (34.7 km^{2})
- Elevation: 243 ft (74 m)

Population (2020 United States Census)
  - Total: 13,641
  - Density: 1,019.8/sq mi (393.7/km^{2})
- Time zone: UTC-8 (Pacific (PST))
  - Summer (DST): UTC-7 (PDT)
- ZIP code: 98335
- Area code: 253
- FIPS code: 53-02910
- GNIS feature ID: 2407769

Artondale is a census-designated place (CDP) in Pierce County, Washington, United States. The population was 13,641 at the 2020 census.

== Parks and recreation ==
Artondale contains several PenMet Parks. Wollochet Bay Estuary Park is a 20.3-acre park with 854 feet of shoreline located to the east of Wollochet Dr NW. The park contains and protects the saltwater marsh where freshwater from Artondale Creek mixes with saltwater from Wollochet Bay, creating a unique ecosystem important to the area's bird population. The park is considered to be "undeveloped", consisting mainly of an open grassy area with some crabapple trees. Views of the estuary and access to the creek and the bay are limited by trees and other foliage. The park is most easily accessed when heading north on Wollochet Dr NW, where one can make a sharp right curve into the gravel road adjacent to a private driveway. This gravel road is the only parking available. Parking is not usually an issue at this park.

Harbor Family Park, located at the intersection of 70th Ave NW and 32nd St NW, is a relatively recent addition to the park system made up of areas that were once private residences. Now the houses are gone, and only a few concrete foundations and traces of old, dirt driveways remain, though neighboring houses can often be glimpsed through the trees. The park consists of dirt trails that wind their way through 18.7 acres of lush, second-growth forest. The gravel parking lot can be accessed via either 70th Ave NW or 32nd St NW. At the parking lot, a trashcan and entrance sign mark the start of the trails. Trails can also be accessed by foot at several places along 70th Ave NW. The trails are popular with dog-walkers and runners. The trails are unmarked and often diverge and converge unexpectedly, so users unfamiliar with the area may want to stick to the trails close to 70th Ave NW, where the sounds and glimpses of cars keep one from getting lost.

Hales Pass Park is technically a part of the Artondale CDP, though it is traditionally associated with the community of Arletta. The stone building and attached picnic shelter on the site were originally constructed by the Civilian Conservation Core in 1938 to serve as the Arletta School. The building currently houses the Arletta Montessori preschool. Adjacent to the school building is a small baseball field. Tucked away off 36th St NW behind a bus barn are two public tennis courses.

== Education ==
Artondale Elementary School is a public school offering kindergarten through fifth grade for youngsters within the Peninsula School District. In addition to providing an education for its "Otters", the adjacent playing fields and playground equipment function as an additional park for the area. On snowy days, toddlers and teens alike flock to the hills on the playfields to sled, build snowmen, or have snowball fights. In the summertime, neighborhood kids will scramble over the jungle gyms while nearby, community sports teams practice and compete at one of the four baseball diamonds. The Artondale Elementary School Campus also houses several classes of the Gig Harbor Coop preschool.

Voyager Elementary School and Kopachuck Middle School sit near the Western edge of the Artondale CDP. Both schools serve students of the Peninsula School District. Voyager offers grades from kindergarten-5th grade, while Kopachuck offers 6-8th grade. The majority of Kopachuck students are graduates of either Voyager or Artondale, both of which funnel into Kopachuck Middle School. Most students from Kopachuck will go on to Gig Harbor High School for grades 9–12. Voyager's mascot is the Vikings, while Kopachuck is the home of the Coyotes. Both schools are across the street from Kopachuck State Park, the only state park on the Gig Harbor Peninsula.

== Notable places ==
The Artondale Grange is the most historic building in Artondale. Even as farming has declined in the area, the Grange has remained as a landmark and community center, housing everything from Girl Scout meetings to Haunted Houses.

Artondale also has its own community cemetery, located off of Hunt St NW. This small, historic cemetery offers grassy, shaded plots.

The cowfarm located near where 40th St NW becomes Wollochet Dr NW also serves as an iconic landmark and a reminder of the agrarian roots of the Artondale community.

== Geography ==
According to the United States Census Bureau, the CDP has a total area of 13.8 square miles (35.8 km^{2}), of which, 13.6 square miles (35.2 km^{2}) of it is land and 0.25 square miles (0.7 km^{2}) of it (1.82%) is water. The Artondale CDP encompasses parts of other communities not normally considered a part of Artondale by locals, such as parts of Cromwell, Warren and Arletta to the south, Sylvia Lake and Rosedale to the northwest, and Wollochet and Midway to the northeast. The more "traditional" area of Artondale is usually considered to be the portions of the CDP south of Hunt St NW, west of Wollochet Dr NW, north of 32nd St NW, and east of 92nd Ave NW.

Artondale Creek runs through Artondale, before emptying out into Wollochet Bay. Public access to the creek is very limited, though the creek and the opening into Wollochet Bay can be viewed from the pedestrian sidewalk near the intersection of Wollochet Drive NW and Artondale Drive NW, or by exploring through Wollochet Bay Estuary Park. Artondale Creek is known to be a salmon spawning site.

== Climate ==
Similar to most of the Puget Sound region, Artondale has a wet and mild climate. Though rainfall per year is only slightly above average (41.67 inches vs. 39.2 in.), this rainfall is spread out, creating a higher average number of days with precipitation (131.5 days compared to the national average of 102 days), and a lower-than-average number of "sunny" days (142 days compared to a national average of 205 days). Many days are both "sunny" and "cloudy", with clouds moving quickly in and out of the area. The three months with highest rainfall are January, November, and December. Snow is a rare occurrence in Artondale, with an average of less than 2 inches per year. The snow that does fall tends to be very wet, and snowfall often occurs when temperatures are hovering right around freezing, which can lead to the formation of black ice and dangerous driving conditions. This does not mean that below-freezing days are rare. It's not uncommon to have week-long spells of winter days with lows in the 20s and highs in the mid-to-low 30s. However, usually when the temperature drops, the clouds break up leading to two common winter weather scenarios: cold and clear, or warm and rainy. The coldest month of the year is December, with an average high of 45 °F and an average low of 36 °F. Windstorms are a fairly regular occurrence, especially from October to January. The main hazards created by windstorms are related to natural debris (such as branches or small trees) falling onto homes, roadways or power lines.

The "dry" season lasts from May to September, with an average of less than 3 inches of rain falling per month. The driest month of the year is July. Though overall precipitation in August is low, this is also the month with the most thunderstorms (both "wet" and "dry"). These storms are often accompanied by sheet lightning; fork lightning is rare. June and early July tend to be cloudy or overcast in the morning, with the cloud cover burning off as the day goes on. The hottest time of the day tends to be in the late afternoon, between 2 and 4 pm. Houses with air-conditioning are few and far between, so on the rare days when the temperature soars above 85 degrees, locals tend to flock to the water or places known to have air-conditioning, such as the movie theater. Kopachuck State Park is an especially popular destination for those with neither air-conditioning, nor waterfront access. The hottest months are July and August, which both have average lows in the mid-50s and an average high of 75 °F.

== Demographics ==
Historical population
Census	Pop.	Note	%±
1990	7,141		—
2000	8,630		20.9%
2010	12,653		46.6%
2020	13,641		7.8%
U.S. Decennial Census; 1970 1980 1990; 2000 2010 2020

Artondale first appeared as a census designated place in the 1990 U.S. census.

=== Racial and ethnic composition ===
Artondale CDP, Washington – Racial and ethnic composition Note: the US Census treats Hispanic/Latino as an ethnic category. This table excludes Latinos from the racial categories and assigns them to a separate category. Hispanics/Latinos may be of any race.
Race / Ethnicity (NH = Non-Hispanic)	Pop 2000	Pop 2010	Pop 2020	% 2000	% 2010	% 2020
White alone (NH)	7,856	11,223	11,198	91.03%	88.70%	82.09%
Black or African American alone (NH)	59	71	85	0.68%	0.56%	0.62%
Native American or Alaska Native alone (NH)	42	73	51	0.49%	0.58%	0.37%
Asian alone (NH)	127	253	367	1.47%	2.00%	2.69%
Native Hawaiian or Pacific Islander alone (NH)	24	47	40	0.28%	0.37%	0.29%
Other race alone (NH)	18	11	118	0.21%	0.09%	0.87%
Mixed race or Multiracial (NH)	232	388	924	2.69%	3.07%	6.77%
Hispanic or Latino (any race)	272	587	858	3.15%	4.64%	6.29%
Total	8,630	12,653	13,641	100.00%	100.00%	100.00%

=== 2020 census ===
As of the 2020 census, Artondale had a population of 13,641. The median age was 45.1 years. 23.1% of residents were under the age of 18 and 20.3% were 65 years of age or older. For every 100 females, there were 96.0 males, and for every 100 females age 18 and over, there were 94.3 males.

100.0% of residents lived in urban areas and 0.0% lived in rural areas.

There were 5,016 households in Artondale, of which 33.5% had children under the age of 18 living in them. Of all households, 70.0% were married-couple households, 10.1% were households with a male householder and no spouse or partner present, and 16.0% were households with a female householder and no spouse or partner present. About 15.8% of all households were made up of individuals and 8.8% had someone living alone who was 65 years of age or older.

There were 5,234 housing units, of which 4.2% were vacant. The homeowner vacancy rate was 0.6% and the rental vacancy rate was 4.8%.

Racial composition as of the 2020 census
Race	Number	Percent
White	11,447	83.9%
Black or African American	97	0.7%
American Indian and Alaska Native	69	0.5%
Asian	380	2.8%
Native Hawaiian and Other Pacific Islander	40	0.3%
Some other race	288	2.1%
Two or more races	1,320	9.7%
Hispanic or Latino (of any race)	858	6.3%

=== 2010 census ===
As of the 2010 census, there were 12,653 people and 4,585 households with about 2.91 persons per household residing in the CDP. The population density was 931.5 people per square mile. There were 4,944 housing units in 2010.

The racial makeup of the CDP was 91.4% White, 0.6% African American, 0.7% Native American, 2.2% Asian, 0.4% Pacific Islander, and 3.7% from two or more races. Hispanic or Latino of any race were 4.6% of the population.

By 2010, the percentage of the population under the age of 18 had dropped to 26.2%, while the percentage of the population over age 65 had risen to 12.2%. Just over half (50.9%) of the population was female. Veterans made up 11% of the population, with 1,398 residing in the CDP.

=== 2000 census ===
In 2000, Artondale had 3,006 households, out of which 44.6% had children under the age of 18 living with them, 71.8% were married couples living together, 8.9% had a female householder with no husband present, and 16.1% were non-families. 13.0% of all households were made up of individuals, and 3.6% had someone living alone who was 65 years of age or older. The average household size was 2.87 and the average family size was 3.14. The population was spread out, with 30% under the age of 18, 6.3% from 18 to 24, 27.6% from 25 to 44, 28.5% from 45 to 64, and 7.2% who were 65 years of age or older. The median age was 38 years. For every 100 females, there were 97.4 males. For every 100 females age 18 and over, there were 94.4 males.

In 2000, the median income for a household in the CDP was $63,500, and the median income for a family was $66,533. Males had a median income of $52,261 versus $35,992 for females. The per capita income for the CDP was $25,539. About 1.3% of families and 3.0% of the population were below the poverty line, including 2.2% of those under age 18 and none of those age 65 or over.

=== Demographic estimates ===
From 2011 to 2015, it was estimated that 84.6% of housing units were occupied by their owners. These units had a median value of $365,400, with median monthly owner costs, including a mortgage, being $2,088.

From 2011 to 2015, 5.3% of the population was foreign born, and 7.7% of households spoke a language other than English at home.

=== Income and poverty ===
The median household income from 2011 to 2015 was $88,539, a 40% increase from the median income in 2000 of $63,500. About 1/5 of households made between $100,000 and 150,000 per year. The percentage of persons in poverty remained the same as in 2000, hovering around 3.0%, indicating that the rich-poor gap in Artondale likely increased over the last decade. Around 2/3 of residents ages 16 or over were in the civilian labor force (63.2%). According to Sperling's Best Places, the unemployment rate in December 2016 was 6.50%, slightly higher than the national average. Residents traveled an average of 28 minutes to get to work. The most common areas of occupation were: sales, office, administrative support (29.58%); management, business, finance (16.65%), production, transportation, material moving (8.5%); health care practitioners and technology (7.93%); education, library (7.63%), construction, extraction, maintenance/repair (5.4%); food preparation, serving (4.69%); and engineering, computers, science (4.5%). Artondale is fairly educated, with 96.5% of those 25 or older having a high school diploma, and 44.6% of those 25 or older having a bachelor's degree or higher. Health care coverage in the community is also higher than average, with 6.4% of residents lacking health insurance.
