= Lake Shetek State Park =

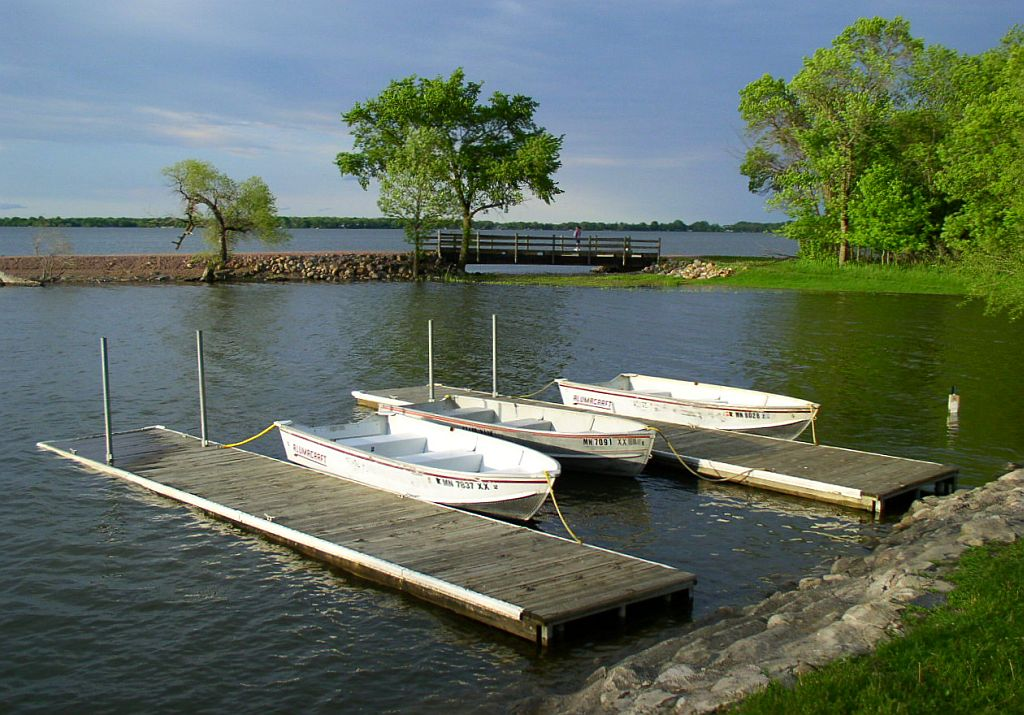
- Rental rowboats and a WPA-built causeway to Loon Island

- Location within Minnesota Location within the United States
- Location: Murray, Minnesota, United States
- Coordinates: 44°6′14″N 95°41′25″W
- Area: 1,109 acres (4.49 km^{2})
- Elevation: 1,506 ft (459 m)
- Established: 1937
- Named for: Lake Shetek
- Governing body: Minnesota Department of Natural Resources

Lake Shetek State Park

- Lake Shetek State Park WPA/Rustic Style Group Camp
- U.S. National Register of Historic Places
- U.S. Historic district
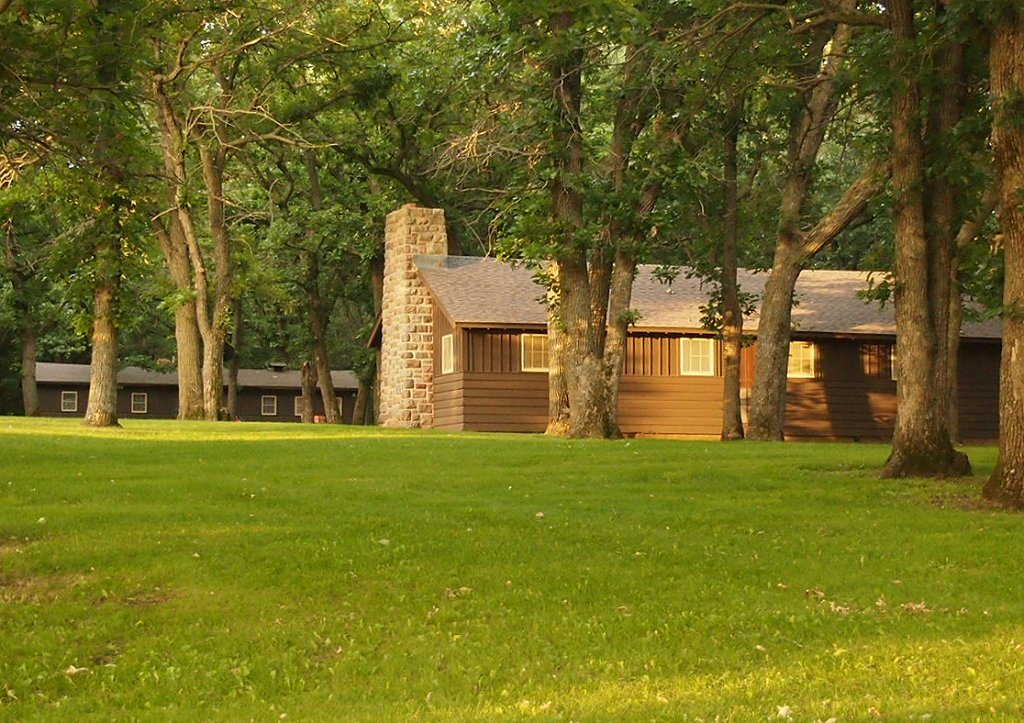
- The Zuya Group Center
- Area: 2.5 acres (1.0 ha)
- Built: 1940–1941
- Architect: Harold Peterson, N. Nielsen, Works Progress Administration
- Architectural style: National Park Service rustic
- MPS: Minnesota State Park CCC/WPA/Rustic Style MPS
- NRHP reference No.: 92000777
- Added to NRHP: July 2, 1992

- Lake Shetek State Park WPA/Rustic Style Historic District
- U.S. National Register of Historic Places
- U.S. Historic district
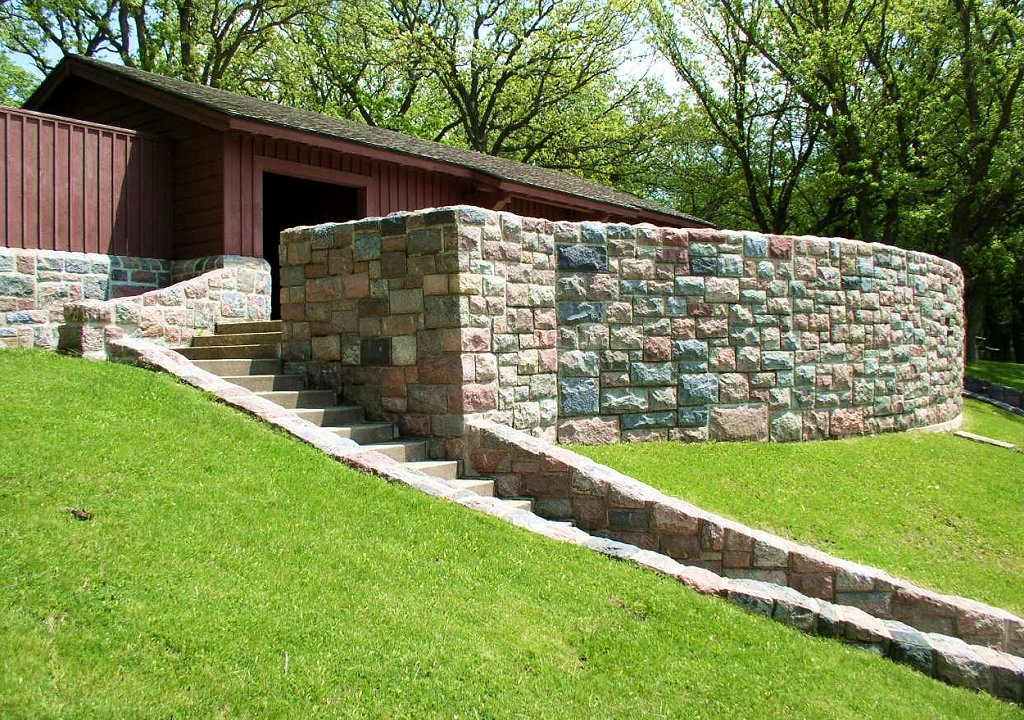
- The Lake Shetek beachhouse
- Area: 34 acres (14 ha)
- Built: 1938–1941
- Architectural style: National Park Service rustic
- MPS: Minnesota State Park CCC/WPA/Rustic Style MPS
- NRHP reference No.: 89001656
- Added to NRHP: July 2, 1992

Lake Shetek State Park is a state park of Minnesota, United States, on Lake Shetek, which is the largest lake in southwestern Minnesota and the headwaters of the Des Moines River. It is most popular for water recreation and camping. However the park also contains historical resources related to the Dakota War of 1862, including an original log cabin and a monument to 15 white settlers killed there and at nearby Slaughter Slough on August 20, 1862.

The park and lake were developed by the Works Progress Administration during the Great Depression. Two districts of park structures built in the National Park Service rustic style are listed on the National Register of Historic Places.

== Geography ==
Lake Shetek State Park occupies 1,109 acres (449 ha) on the east shore of Lake Shetek in northeastern Murray County, 4 miles (6.4 km) outside the town of Currie. The park is about 13 miles (21 km) equidistant from both Tracy to the north and Slayton to the southwest, and 33 miles (53 km) southeast of the city of Marshall.

Almost 7 miles (11 km) of shoreline on Lake Shetek lie within the park boundary, though inholdings with private homes comprise some of that distance. The park includes 45-acre (18 ha) Loon Island, which is connected to the mainland by a 1,000-foot (300 m) causeway. Two smaller lakes, two fish rearing ponds, and two marshes are also within the park boundaries.

The park lies on the Coteau des Prairies, a plateau at the juncture of Minnesota, South Dakota, and Iowa. Southwest of the drainage basin of the Des Moines River there are no natural lakes for some distance. For this reason the state park attracts many visitors from neighboring parts of Iowa and South Dakota.

== Natural history ==
=== Geology ===
Lake Shetek and the surrounding landscape of wetlands and rolling hills are the result of glaciation. The lake and park lie on the Altamont Moraine, a terminal moraine marking the farthest extent of an ice lobe during the Wisconsin glaciation. This most-recent glaciation deposited a very thick blanket of till over the area. A well just outside the park was drilled through 375 feet (114 m) of till without reaching bedrock.

Lake Shetek began forming as the climate started to warm 15,000 years ago. Water from the melting glaciers carved channels into the moraine. Where one channel—now occupied by Beaver Creek—intersected the channel now occupied by the Des Moines River, a buildup of sediment and slumping banks partially dammed the outflow, creating a large, shallow lake.

=== Flora ===
Prior to European cultivation, most of the future park was prairie. Settlers recorded that the only trees were on Lake Shetek's islands, which were protected from wildfires. They were not protected from the settlers, however, and were soon harvested. Ecological succession has converted the old fields mostly to northern hardwood forest composed of oak, hackberry, basswood, elm, and ash trees. Restoration ecology efforts are being made to return park grasslands to native prairie.

The secondary forest on Loon Island was heavily impacted in the 1970s when Dutch elm disease decimated the American and red elms. The mossy trunks and stumps of dead elms still litter the island, providing shelter and nutrients to the ecosystem.

=== Fauna ===
Mammals found in the park include white-tailed deer, foxes, minks, beavers, fox squirrels, muskrats, groundhogs, and coyotes.

The park's combination of lake, woods, and marshes at the head of the Des Moines River flyway attracts a wide variety of bird life. Waterfowl include ducks, herons, coots, grebes, and white pelicans, and many species breed in the area. Among the woodland birds are flycatchers, sparrows, thrushes, vireos, many species of warbler, and blue-gray gnatcatchers. Marsh birds include lesser yellowlegs, spotted sandpipers, Wilson's snipes, and upland sandpipers.

The park's two major geographic features are both named after birds. "Shetek" is derived from the Ojibwe language word for pelican. Loon Island is a misnomer, however; the large diving birds seen by the pioneers were double-crested cormorants, not common loons. In the 1910s locals blamed the cormorants for depleting Lake Shetek's fish population and organized a hunt to extirpate them. Due to the hunt and ongoing human disturbance, the species is only seen on Lake Shetek during migration and no longer breeds there.

None of the park's small lakes or marshes support a year-round fish population.

== Cultural history ==
The earliest humans around Lake Shetek were likely following the bison that came there to drink. Archaeologists identify the first permanent inhabitants as members of the Great Oasis culture. Two burial mounds were identified in a 1973 archaeological survey. By the beginning of the historical period, the area was in the territory of the Dakota people.

White explorers documented the area in the 1830s and 40s: George Catlin, Joseph Nicollet, Philander Prescott, and John C. Frémont. The first settler arrived on the east shore of Lake Shetek in 1856.

=== Lake Shetek Massacre ===
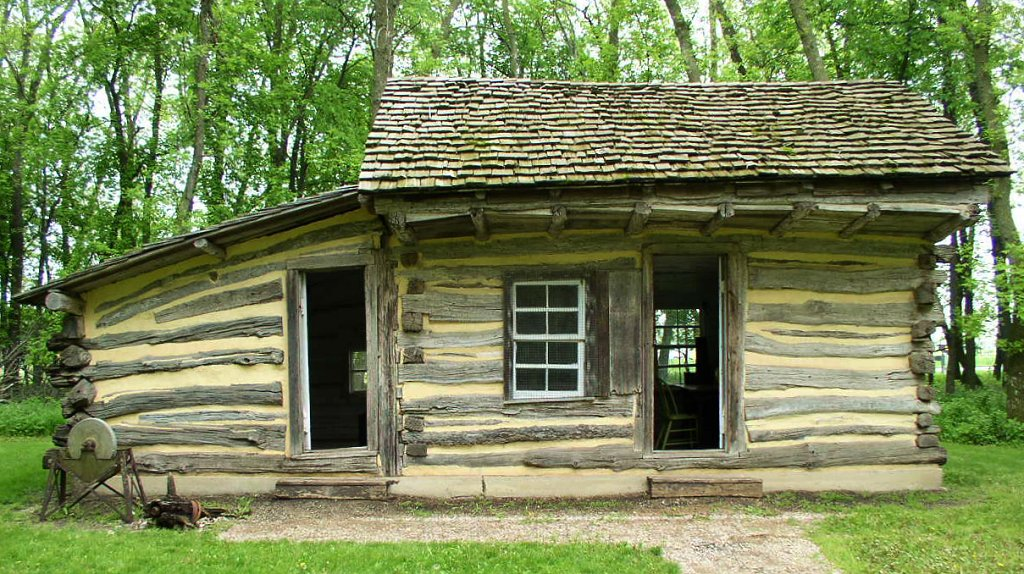
The restored and relocated 1859 Koch Cabin

By 1862 about half a dozen families had formed a small settlement along the eastern shore of Lake Shetek, totaling perhaps 40 adults and children. At least four cabins were located within the current park boundaries, at the time the very edge of the frontier. The growing Euro-American population, however, was making it increasingly difficult for the native Dakota people to pursue their traditional lifestyle. Resettlement on reservations, treaty violations by the United States, and late or unfair annuity payments by Indian agents caused increasing hunger and hardship among the Dakota.

On August 20, 1862, two bands of Dakota led by Lean Grizzly Bear and White Lodge swept through the settlement, killing two men while letting the others flee. The settlers gathered at the southernmost cabin, where the leader of a third band, Old Pawn, offered them escape if they left behind their belongings for the other Dakota to loot. The whites headed east but the angry Dakota soon appeared and fired on the group. John Eastlick shot and killed Lean Grizzly Bear, and the settlers took cover in a slough. The Dakota fired into the slough over several hours, killing John Eastlick and others and wounding many more. Old Pawn promised safety to the women and children, but violence erupted again as they emerged from the slough and several were killed while others were taken captive.

Ultimately 15 settlers from six families were killed. 21 settlers lived through the attack at the slough and made their way across the prairie to safety. Three women and eight or nine children were captured and taken west. That November the surviving eight captives were ransomed from White Lodge's band by a group of young pacifist Lakota and eventually reunited with their families.

Two months after the attack a military burial detail interred the victims in a temporary mass grave near the slough. A year later the remains were reburied closer to the lake, where they still lie. White settlers largely abandoned the war zone for the next four decades. In 1905 and again in 1921 the Minnesota Legislature earmarked money for a monument on the site, but Murray County officials did not take action. Finally, with the backing of state senator Louis P. Johnson, a government-funded monument was erected over the gravesite. The 25-foot-tall (7.6 m) granite pillar was dedicated on August 3, 1925. Since the monument was surrounded by private property, four years later Johnson initiated legislation that declared a 10-acre (4.0 ha) state park around the site.

In the following decades the original Koch family home was used as a vacation cabin on the grounds of the Tepeeotah Resort, before being donated to the county in 1960. It was moved into the state park in 1962 on the site of the Duley Cabin. For the centennial of the massacre that year, 1,500 people were in attendance. High winds knocked over some flagpoles, injuring an Eastlick descendant. A state park official deadpanned in a report to the director, "Eastlick blood was again spilled at Lake Shetek."

=== WPA development ===
Lake Shetek State Park truly took form in the 1930s as part of a larger project on the lake. This was one of the more ambitious New Deal projects in Minnesota funded by the federal government to combat unemployment during the Great Depression. In addition to park amenities, the Works Progress Administration (WPA) planned to build six causeways across the lake, joining a series of islands with the east and west shores. The site was selected for recreational development due to the rarity of lakes in the area and to relieve heavy use of Camden State Park 30 miles (48 km) away.

The state acquired 181 acres (73 ha) adjacent to the massacre memorial, including Keeley and Loon Islands in Lake Shetek. A WPA camp was established on Keeley Island in the fall of 1934, housing 200 homeless or transient men. They constructed park amenities like the entrance road, campground, picnic area, beach, and sewage system. Using local wood and stone they built structures including a beachhouse, picnic shelter, and causeways, as well as a camp called the Zuya Group Center. Their own camp on Keeley Island was, unlike most WPA camps, designed to be permanent and function as a second group camp. However, when the WPA was disbanded with the onset of World War II the last causeway, between Keeley and Loon Islands, was incomplete. Inaccessible from the rest of the park, the property on Keeley Island was sold. The WPA camp is now used by Shetek Lutheran Ministries.

Although the monument site was technically made a state park in 1929, the parks director felt reauthorization was needed for the new acreage under development. At his behest Lake Shetek was included in the ten state parks authorized by the Minnesota Legislature in 1937.

In 1992 two districts of surviving WPA structures in Lake Shetek State Park were placed on the National Register of Historic Places. A 34-acre (14 ha) district on the lakeshore comprises six contributing properties: the 1938 causeway to Loon Island, 1939 beachhouse, and (all built in 1940) the beachhouse steps, kitchen shelter, sanitation building, and drinking fountains. Two buildings at the Zuya Group Center were listed in a 2.5-acre (1.0 ha) district: the 1940 mess hall and 1941 crafts & recreation building. The hillside beachhouse and 6-foot-wide (1.8 m) curving double staircase are particularly noteworthy. Historian David R. Benson has called it "one of the most attractive designs in the park system."

=== Later history ===
Since its development, Lake Shetek State Park has expanded with additional property and features. Around 1950 the state division of fisheries installed two fish-rearing ponds from which to stock local lakes. The fisheries division later turned the ponds over to direct park management. Food plots for deer were maintained for many years because the animals were otherwise leaving the park and eating crops on neighboring fields.

The Minnesota Legislature authorized expansions several times in the 1960s, though many privately owned inholdings remain within the park's statutory boundaries. A park office and entrance station was built in 1965, then converted into the current interpretive center with the construction of a new office/entrance station in 1992. In 1996 a paved loop trail joined the park to Currie. Beginning in 2010 the state added a new campground with electric and water hookups for RVs and remodeled the existing campground. The lakeside Wolf Point Campground, renamed the Oak Woods Campground, was reduced from 78 sites to 42 to provide more privacy and reduce surface runoff into Lake Shetek.

== Recreation ==
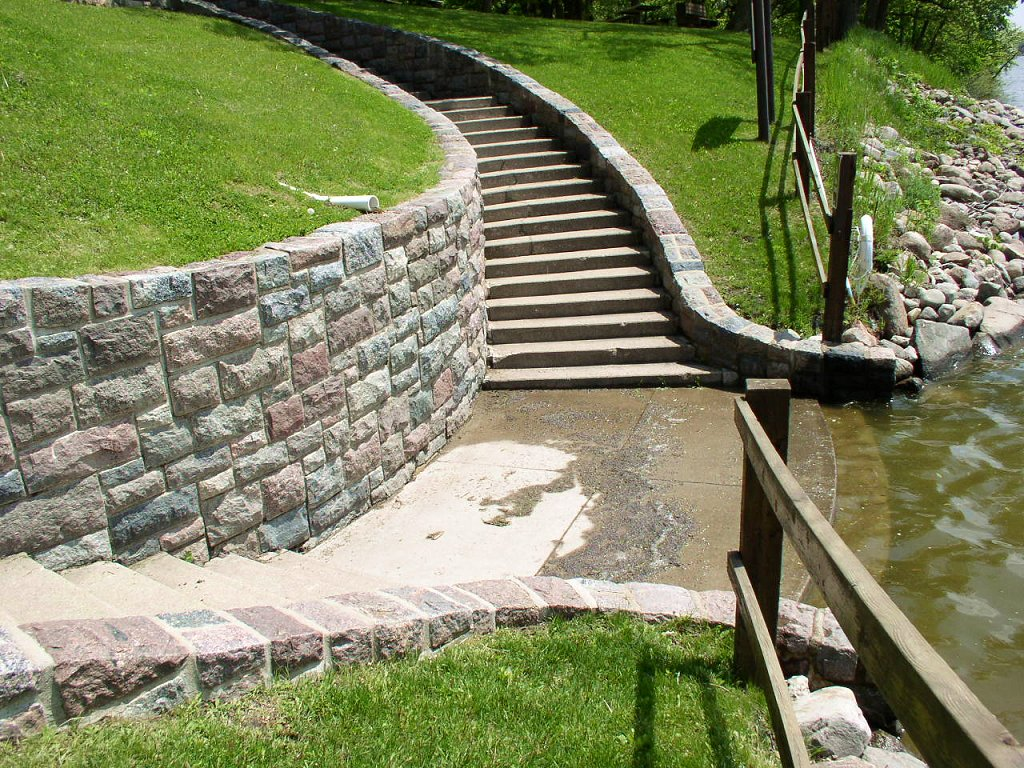
Swimming area and double staircase to the beachhouse

Lake Shetek State Park is a gateway to water recreation on Lake Shetek. The park provides launch facilities for motorboats and canoes, and rents out non-motorized watercraft. Portage trails provide access to two smaller lakes within the park. A swimming area lies at the foot of the beachhouse. Game fish in Lake Shetek include walleye, northern pike, perch, bullhead, crappie, and channel catfish. In winter ice fishing for crappies is popular.

The park contains 70 drive-in campsites spread across three separate campgrounds. All but six sites have electrical hookups. The Oak Woods Campground also offers four camper cabins, eight cart-in sites for tenters, flush toilets, and showers. Elsewhere in the park there is a group camp accommodating up to 30 people in tents and a one more cart-in site.

The park boasts 14 miles (23 km) of hiking trails, including a 1.5-mile (2.4 km) interpretive trail across the causeway and around Loon Island. A 6-mile (9.7 km) paved loop—designated a section of the Casey Jones State Trail—runs between the park and Currie, accommodating joggers, bicyclists, and inline skaters. In winter 5 miles (8.0 km) are open to snowmobiles.

A small visitor center houses interpretive displays. The restored Koch Cabin contains period-accurate furnishings and is open to visitors during business hours. The Eastlick Marsh on the east side of the park boasts an observation deck with a spotting scope to aid in birdwatching.
