= Lake Sarah Township, Murray County, Minnesota =

Lake Sarah Township, Minnesota
- Township
- Location within the state of Minnesota Lake Sarah Township, Minnesota (the United States)
- Coordinates: 44°8′30″N 95°44′58″W
- Country: United States
- State: Minnesota
- County: Murray

Area
  - Total: 36.2 sq mi (93.8 km^{2})
  - Land: 32.9 sq mi (85.1 km^{2})
  - Water: 3.4 sq mi (8.7 km^{2})
- Elevation: 1,526 ft (465 m)

Population (2000)
  - Total: 348
  - Density: 11/sq mi (4.1/km^{2})
- Time zone: UTC-6 (Central (CST))
  - Summer (DST): UTC-5 (CDT)
- FIPS code: 27-34892
- GNIS feature ID: 0664698

Lake Sarah Township is a township in Murray County, Minnesota, United States. The population was 348 at the 2000 census. It contains part of the census-designated place of The Lakes.

Lake Sarah Township was organized in 1873, and named for the largest lake within its borders.

== Geography ==
According to the United States Census Bureau, the township has a total area of 36.2 square miles (94 km^{2}), of which 32.9 square miles (85 km^{2}) is land and 3.4 square miles (8.8 km^{2}) (9.30%) is water.

== Demographics ==
As of the census of 2000, there were 348 people, 151 households, and 120 families residing in the township. The population density was 10.6 inhabitants per square mile (4.1/km^{2}). There were 216 housing units at an average density of 6.6 per square mile (2.5/km^{2}). The racial makeup of the township was 99.71% White, and 0.29% from two or more races.

There were 151 households, out of which 17.9% had children under the age of 18 living with them, 76.2% were married couples living together, 3.3% had a female householder with no husband present, and 19.9% were non-families. 14.6% of all households were made up of individuals, and 4.6% had someone living alone who was 65 years of age or older. The average household size was 2.30 and the average family size was 2.54.

In the township the population was spread out, with 16.7% under the age of 18, 3.7% from 18 to 24, 25.6% from 25 to 44, 37.9% from 45 to 64, and 16.1% who were 65 years of age or older. The median age was 48 years. For every 100 females, there were 108.4 males. For every 100 females age 18 and over, there were 104.2 males.

The median income for a household in the township was $43,125, and the median income for a family was $45,938. Males had a median income of $36,625 versus $21,429 for females. The per capita income for the township was $23,143. About 5.0% of families and 3.0% of the population were below the poverty line, including none of those under the age of eighteen or sixty-five or over.

== Politics ==
Lake Sarah Township is located in Minnesota's 1st congressional district, represented by Mankato educator Tim Walz, a Democrat. At the state level, Lake Sarah Township is located in Senate District 22, represented by Republican Doug Magnus, and in House District 22A, represented by Republican Joe Schomacker.
