= Windom Wetland Management District =

Conservation management unit of local government in Minnesota, United States

Coordinates: 43°51′27″N 95°5′25″W

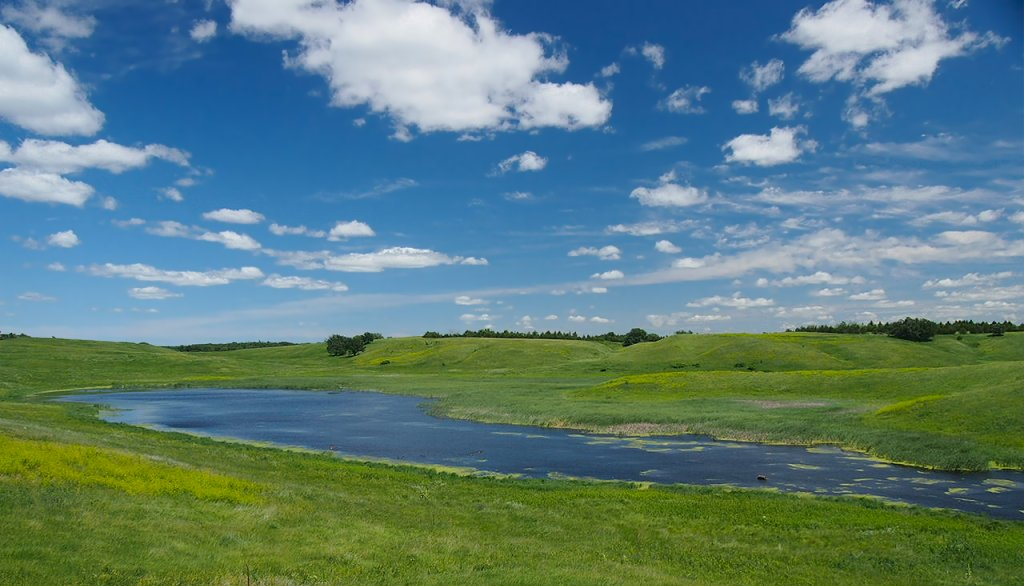
Wolf Lake Waterfowl Production Area, a unit of the Windom Wetland Management District

The Windom Wetland Management District acquires and manages Waterfowl Production Areas, enforces wetland easements, and provides conservation assistance to landowners in 12 southwestern Minnesota counties (Brown, Cottonwood, Faribault, Freeborn, Jackson, Martin, Murray, Nobles, Pipestone, Redwood, Rock and Watonwan). The landscape is dominated by intense, row-crop agriculture, which has led to the drainage of most wetlands and widespread water quality problems. Deteriorating drainage tile systems and the abundance of historic wetland basins provide unlimited opportunities for wetland restorations.

Heron Lake in Jackson County is a 6,400-acre (2,600 ha), shallow, prairie lake suffering from over-enrichment due to agricultural run-off; high populations of rough fish; and loss of aquatic vegetation; all symptoms typical to area lakes. Heron Lake is the focus of a multi-partner effort to restore the lake and its 472-square-mile (1,220 km^{2}) watershed. The District is an active partner in this effort.

District staff work closely with private landowners to restore and protect degraded and critical habitat. Between 1990 and 2006, the District restored 690 wetlands, covering 8,433 acres (3,413 ha) on both public and private owned lands in the twelve counties it manages. During this same period, 1,991 acres (806 ha) of prairie remnants and native grasslands on 73 sites were restored or protected.

Hunters and wildlife enthusiasts can visit one of 65 Waterfowl Production Areas (WPAs) encompassing nearly 14,000 acres (57 km^{2}) for permitted recreational activities. Construction of a 3/4 mile walking trail was completed in 2006 and is located adjacent to the headquarters and interpretive center at Wolf Lake WPA. The facility provides many opportunities for environmental education and interpretation opportunities with local schools and the visiting public.

The Windom Wetland Management District also manages the first fee title tract of the Northern Tallgrass Prairie National Wildlife Refuge. Touch the Sky Prairie is a nearly 800-acre (320 ha) unit of the refuge dedicated to helping preserve native tallgrass prairie. Less than one-tenth of one percent of the original Tallgrass Prairie remains. Touch the Sky Prairie is located 4 miles (6.4 km) north and 3 miles (4.8 km) west of the city of Luverne in Rock County, Minnesota.
