= Garvin, Minnesota =

City in Minnesota, United States

- City
- Location of Garvin, Minnesota
- Coordinates: 44°12′51″N 95°45′38″W
- Country: United States
- State: Minnesota
- County: Lyon

Government
  - Type: Mayor – Council
  - Mayor: Jim Julien

Area
  - Total: 0.29 sq mi (0.75 km^{2})
  - Land: 0.28 sq mi (0.72 km^{2})
  - Water: 0.012 sq mi (0.03 km^{2})
- Elevation: 1,539 ft (469 m)

Population (2020)
  - Total: 124
  - Density: 443.5/sq mi (171.23/km^{2})
- Time zone: UTC-6 (Central (CST))
  - Summer (DST): UTC-5 (CDT)
- ZIP code: 56132
- Area code: 507
- FIPS code: 27-23228
- GNIS feature ID: 2394861

Garvin is a city in Lyon County, Minnesota, United States. As of the 2020 census, Garvin had a population of 124.

== History ==
Garvin was originally called Terry, for Union general Alfred Terry, and under the latter name was platted in 1886 by the railroad. The present name, for H. C. Garvin, a railroad official, was adopted in 1881.

== Geography ==
According to the United States Census Bureau, the city has a total area of 0.28 square miles (0.73 km^{2}), of which 0.27 square miles (0.70 km^{2}) is land and 0.01 square miles (0.03 km^{2}) is water.

== Demographics ==
Historical population
Census	Pop.	Note	%±
1950	264		—
1960	205		−22.3%
1970	201		−2.0%
1980	172		−14.4%
1990	149		−13.4%
2000	159		6.7%
2010	135		−15.1%
2020	124		−8.1%
U.S. Decennial Census

=== 2010 census ===
As of the census of 2010, there were 135 people, 52 households, and 38 families living in the city. The population density was 500.0 inhabitants per square mile (193.1/km^{2}). There were 62 housing units at an average density of 229.6 per square mile (88.6/km^{2}). The racial makeup of the city was 97.0% White and 3.0% from two or more races.

There were 52 households, of which 32.7% had children under the age of 18 living with them, 55.8% were married couples living together, 11.5% had a female householder with no husband present, 5.8% had a male householder with no wife present, and 26.9% were non-families. 19.2% of all households were made up of individuals. The average household size was 2.60 and the average family size was 2.97.

The median age in the city was 38.5 years. 26.7% of residents were under the age of 18; 5.9% were between the ages of 18 and 24; 27.4% were from 25 to 44; 32.5% were from 45 to 64; and 7.4% were 65 years of age or older. The gender makeup of the city was 54.1% male and 45.9% female.

=== 2000 census ===
As of the census of 2000, there were 159 people, 57 households, and 44 families living in the city. The population density was 590.3 inhabitants per square mile (227.9/km^{2}). There were 68 housing units at an average density of 252.5 per square mile (97.5/km^{2}). The racial makeup of the city was 95.60% White, 3.14% Native American, 0.63% Asian, 0.63% from other races. Hispanic or Latino of any race were 1.26% of the population.

There were 57 households, out of which 45.6% had children under the age of 18 living with them, 61.4% were married couples living together, 5.3% had a female householder with no husband present, and 22.8% were non-families. 19.3% of all households were made up of individuals, and 14.0% had someone living alone who was 65 years of age or older. The average household size was 2.79 and the average family size was 3.20.

In the city, the population was spread out, with 32.1% under the age of 18, 8.2% from 18 to 24, 31.4% from 25 to 44, 18.2% from 45 to 64, and 10.1% who were 65 years of age or older. The median age was 33 years. For every 100 females, there were 112.0 males. For every 100 females age 18 and over, there were 107.7 males.

The median income for a household in the city was $38,750, and the median income for a family was $41,429. Males had a median income of $25,556 versus $18,750 for females. The per capita income for the city was $13,108. About 7.4% of families and 8.2% of the population were below the poverty line, including 3.4% of those under the age of eighteen and 15.4% of those 65 or over.
