= Currie, Minnesota =

City in Minnesota, United States

- City
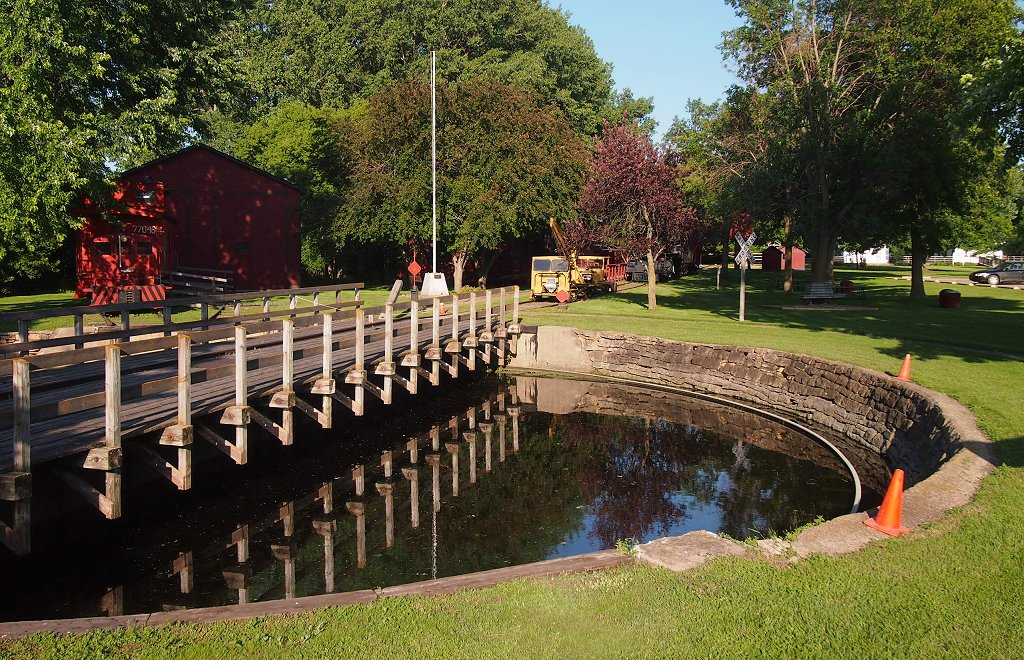
- Railway turntable at the End-O-Line Railroad Park and Museum in Currie, Minnesota
- Motto: "Gateway to Lake Shetek"
- Location in Murray County and the state of Minnesota
- Coordinates: 44°04′14″N 95°40′01″W
- Country: United States
- State: Minnesota
- County: Murray

Government
  - Type: Mayor – Council
  - Mayor: Jebediah Malone

Area
  - Total: 0.55 sq mi (1.43 km^{2})
  - Land: 0.55 sq mi (1.43 km^{2})
  - Water: 0 sq mi (0.00 km^{2})
- Elevation: 1,503 ft (458 m)

Population (2020)
  - Total: 224
  - Density: 407.0/sq mi (157.13/km^{2})
- Time zone: UTC-6 (Central (CST))
  - Summer (DST): UTC-5 (CDT)
- ZIP code: 56123
- Area code: 507
- FIPS code: 27-14320
- GNIS feature ID: 2393698
- Website: curriemn.com

Currie is a city in Murray County, Minnesota, United States. The population was 224 at the 2020 census. Lake Shetek State Park is nearby. The city, notable for its tourism and recreational opportunities, is known as the "Gateway to Lake Shetek", the largest lake in Southwestern Minnesota and for being home to the End-O-Line Railroad Park and Museum.

== History ==
Currie was laid out in 1872 around a gristmill built by Neil and Archibald Currie. A post office has been in operation at Currie since 1874.

== Geography ==
Currie is in northeastern Murray County and is surrounded by Murray Township. Minnesota State Highway 30 passes through the south side of the community, leading east 6 miles (10 km) to Dovray and west, then south, 10 miles (16 km) to Slayton, the Murray county seat. Murray County Road 38 runs north and south through Currie, and U.S. Highway 59 is 4 miles (6 km) to the west.

According to the U.S. Census Bureau, Currie has an area of 0.55 square miles (1.42 km^{2}), all of it recorded as land. The Des Moines River has its source 1 mile (1.6 km) northwest of Currie, at the outlet of Lake Shetek, then flows through the north side of Currie and continues to the southeast toward Windom.

== Demographics ==
Historical population
Census	Pop.	Note	%±
1880	78		—
1910	329		—
1920	405		23.1%
1930	435		7.4%
1940	524		20.5%
1950	551		5.2%
1960	438		−20.5%
1970	368		−16.0%
1980	359		−2.4%
1990	303		−15.6%
2000	225		−25.7%
2010	233		3.6%
2020	224		−3.9%
U.S. Decennial Census

=== 2010 census ===
As of the census of 2010, there were 233 people, 114 households, and 65 families residing in the city. The population density was 408.8 inhabitants per square mile (157.8/km^{2}). There were 125 housing units at an average density of 219.3 per square mile (84.7/km^{2}). The racial makeup of the city was 100.0% White. Hispanic or Latino of any race were 1.7% of the population.

There were 114 households, of which 19.3% had children under the age of 18 living with them, 44.7% were married couples living together, 8.8% had a female householder with no husband present, 3.5% had a male householder with no wife present, and 43.0% were non-families. 38.6% of all households were made up of individuals, and 16.7% had someone living alone who was 65 years of age or older. The average household size was 2.04 and the average family size was 2.68.

The median age in the city was 53.3 years. 16.3% of residents were under the age of 18; 6% were between the ages of 18 and 24; 15.5% were from 25 to 44; 34.4% were from 45 to 64; and 27.9% were 65 years of age or older. The gender makeup of the city was 50.6% male and 49.4% female.

=== 2000 census ===
As of the census of 2000, there were 225 people, 109 households, and 67 families residing in the city. The population density was 393.0 inhabitants per square mile (151.7/km^{2}). There were 127 housing units at an average density of 221.9 per square mile (85.7/km^{2}). The racial makeup of the city was 99.56% White, and 0.44% from two or more races. Hispanic or Latino of any race were 0.89% of the population.

There were 109 households, out of which 18.3% had children under the age of 18 living with them, 49.5% were married couples living together, 8.3% had a female householder with no husband present, and 38.5% were non-families. 33.9% of all households were made up of individuals, and 16.5% had someone living alone who was 65 years of age or older. The average household size was 2.06 and the average family size was 2.63.

In the city, the population was spread out, with 19.6% under the age of 18, 4.4% from 18 to 24, 18.7% from 25 to 44, 28.0% from 45 to 64, and 29.3% who were 65 years of age or older. The median age was 49 years. For every 100 females, there were 90.7 males. For every 100 females age 18 and over, there were 84.7 males.

The median income for a household in the city was $22,857, and the median income for a family was $34,821. Males had a median income of $22,500 versus $18,750 for females. The per capita income for the city was $15,767. About 7.3% of families and 12.2% of the population were below the poverty line, including 25.0% of those under the age of eighteen and 8.3% of those 65 or over.

== End-O-Line Railroad Park & Museum ==
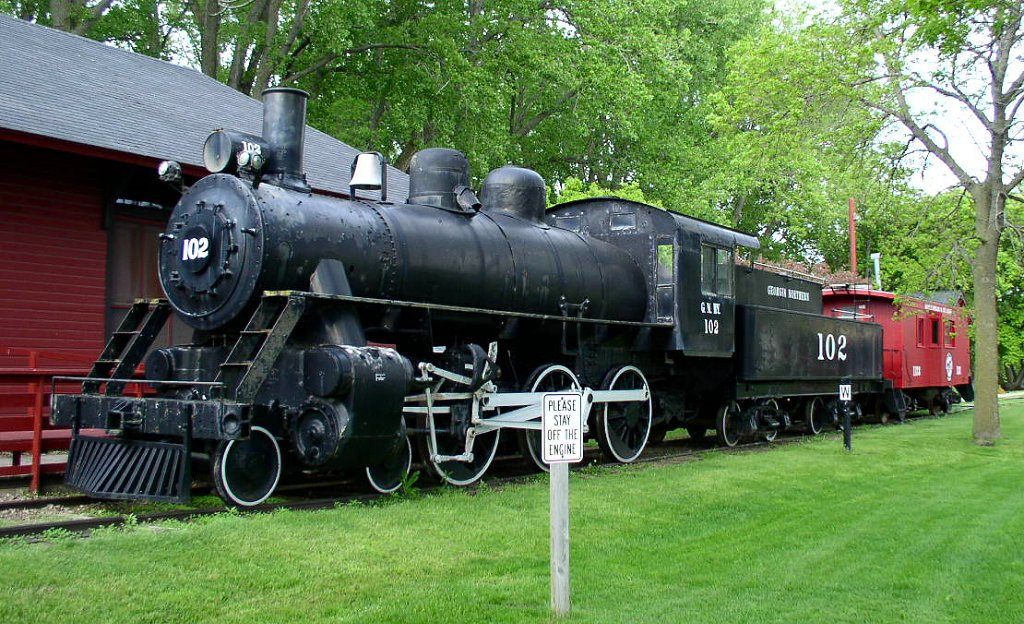
The park's Georgia Northern #102 steam engine and coal tender

End-O-Line Park is nestled on Currie's northern edge. Founded in 1872 by Neil and Archibald Currie, this place was thought to be the most beautiful country with the Des Moines River moving across the prairie and Lake Shetek in the west. The park is along Murray County Road 38 near Minnesota Highway 30.

The railroads were the first great achievement in transportation of the machine age. This achievement led to the expansion and growth of the West. It is this story, as well as the story of the area, that the museum tries to tell.

A model railroad display, in HO scale, is one of the museum's highlights. It is an authentic reproduction of the Currie railroad yards as they were around the turn of the 20th century. The layout features scratch-built locomotives and structures, complete landscaping, a full wraparound mural, and complete sound effects. Visitors can hear the old steam locomotive puff and chug throughout the countryside, accented by the steam whistle, bell, and hiss of steam.

District Number One, the Sunrise School, was moved to End-O-Line Park and restored by the Murray County Historical Society. The embossed tin ceilings and walls, vertical wainscoting, recitation bench and many blackboards are typical, but the triangular sunrise worked into the front and back of the schoolhouse is unique. The one-room school with tin dinner pails, water cooler, washbasin, old world maps, bell tower and rope, ink wells, and cloakrooms brings back memories to share with children.

End-O-Line Park's section house, originally in Comfrey, was built by Chicago and Northwestern for a section foreman and his family. A saltbox structure, the house has been restored to the early 1900 style.

== Recreation ==
Currie has many outdoor activities available to the public. These include the 7-mile (11 km) bike trail that goes through Lake Shetek State Park, Lake Shetek, and local farmland. Just north of town, Lake Shetek is a popular vacation destination for people from all over southwest Minnesota. The lake has a population of approximately 600, and more during the summer. The Currie/Lake Shetek area has a combined population of almost 1,000 during the summer.
