= Artondale Cemetery =

Cemetery in Artondale, Gig Harbor, Washington

- Interactive map of Artondale Cemetery

Details
- Established: 1895
- Location: Gig Harbor, Washington
- Country: United States
- Coordinates: 47.315449°N 122.612019°W
- Size: 2.75 acres (1.11 ha)
- No. of graves: 713
- Find a Grave: Artondale Cemetery

The Artondale Cemetery is located in Artondale, Washington within the larger community of Gig Harbor, Washington, United States.

Established in 1895, the 2.75 acres of land that became the cemetery was donated by Miles B. and Maritta M. Hunt. In that same year articles of incorporation for the cemetery association were filed. The association maintains the property and is a non-profit organization. The association maintains the property and has an all-volunteer annual clean-up day before Memorial Day. The American Legion performs a ceremony on Memorial Day to honor the veterans buried there.
