= Murray Township, Murray County, Minnesota =

Murray Township, Minnesota
- Township
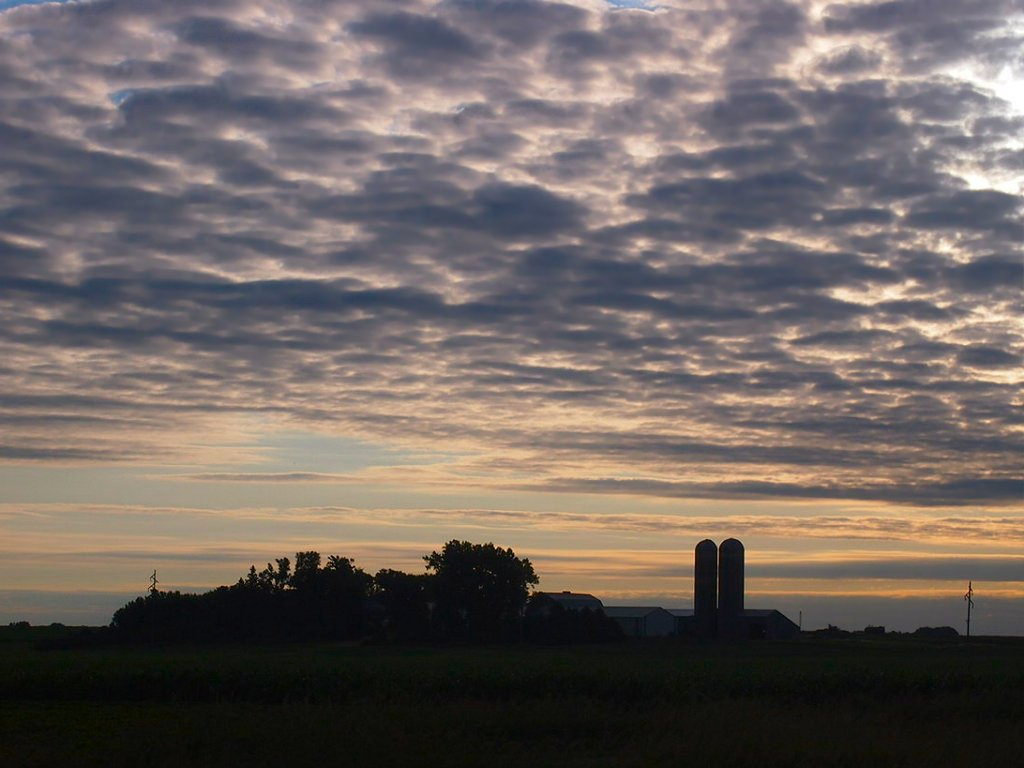
- A cloudy dawn over Murray Township

- Location within the state of Minnesota
- Coordinates: 44°4′11″N 95°39′1″W
- Country: United States
- State: Minnesota
- County: Murray

Area
  - Total: 35.5 sq mi (91.9 km^{2})
  - Land: 34.6 sq mi (89.5 km^{2})
  - Water: 0.93 sq mi (2.4 km^{2})
- Elevation: 1,510 ft (460 m)

Population (2000)
  - Total: 204
  - Density: 6.0/sq mi (2.3/km^{2})
- Time zone: UTC-6 (Central (CST))
  - Summer (DST): UTC-5 (CDT)
- FIPS code: 27-44854
- GNIS feature ID: 0665067

Murray Township is a township in Murray County, Minnesota, United States. The population was 204 at the 2000 census. It contains part of the census-designated place of The Lakes.

== History ==
Murray Township was organized in 1872.

== Geography ==
According to the United States Census Bureau, the township has a total area of 35.5 square miles (91.9 km^{2}), of which 34.6 square miles (89.5 km^{2}) is land and 0.9 square mile (2.4 km^{2}) (2.59%) is water.

== Demographics ==
As of the census of 2000, there were 204 people, 82 households, and 61 families residing in the township. The population density was 5.9 people per square mile (2.3/km^{2}). There were 137 housing units at an average density of 4.0/sq mi (1.5/km^{2}). The racial makeup of the township was 98.53% White, 0.49% African American, 0.49% Asian, and 0.49% from two or more races. Hispanic or Latino of any race were 0.49% of the population.

There were 82 households, out of which 31.7% had children under the age of 18 living with them, 70.7% were married couples living together, 1.2% had a female householder with no husband present, and 25.6% were non-families. 23.2% of all households were made up of individuals, and 8.5% had someone living alone who was 65 years of age or older. The average household size was 2.49 and the average family size was 2.90.

In the township the population was spread out, with 25.0% under the age of 18, 4.9% from 18 to 24, 18.6% from 25 to 44, 37.3% from 45 to 64, and 14.2% who were 65 years of age or older. The median age was 46 years. For every 100 females, there were 110.3 males. For every 100 females age 18 and over, there were 118.6 males.

The median income for a household in the township was $42,361, and the median income for a family was $46,875. Males had a median income of $28,750 versus $21,667 for females. The per capita income for the township was $30,562. About 3.3% of families and 4.8% of the population were below the poverty line, including 5.1% of those under the age of eighteen and 6.5% of those 65 or over.

== Politics ==
Murray Township is located in Minnesota's 1st congressional district, represented by Mankato educator Tim Walz, a Democrat. At the state level, Murray Township is located in Senate District 22, represented by Republican Doug Magnus, and in House District 22A, represented by Republican Joe Schomacker.
