= Slaughter Slough =

Wetland in Minnesota, United States

Lake Shetek Massacre
- Part of Dakota War of 1862
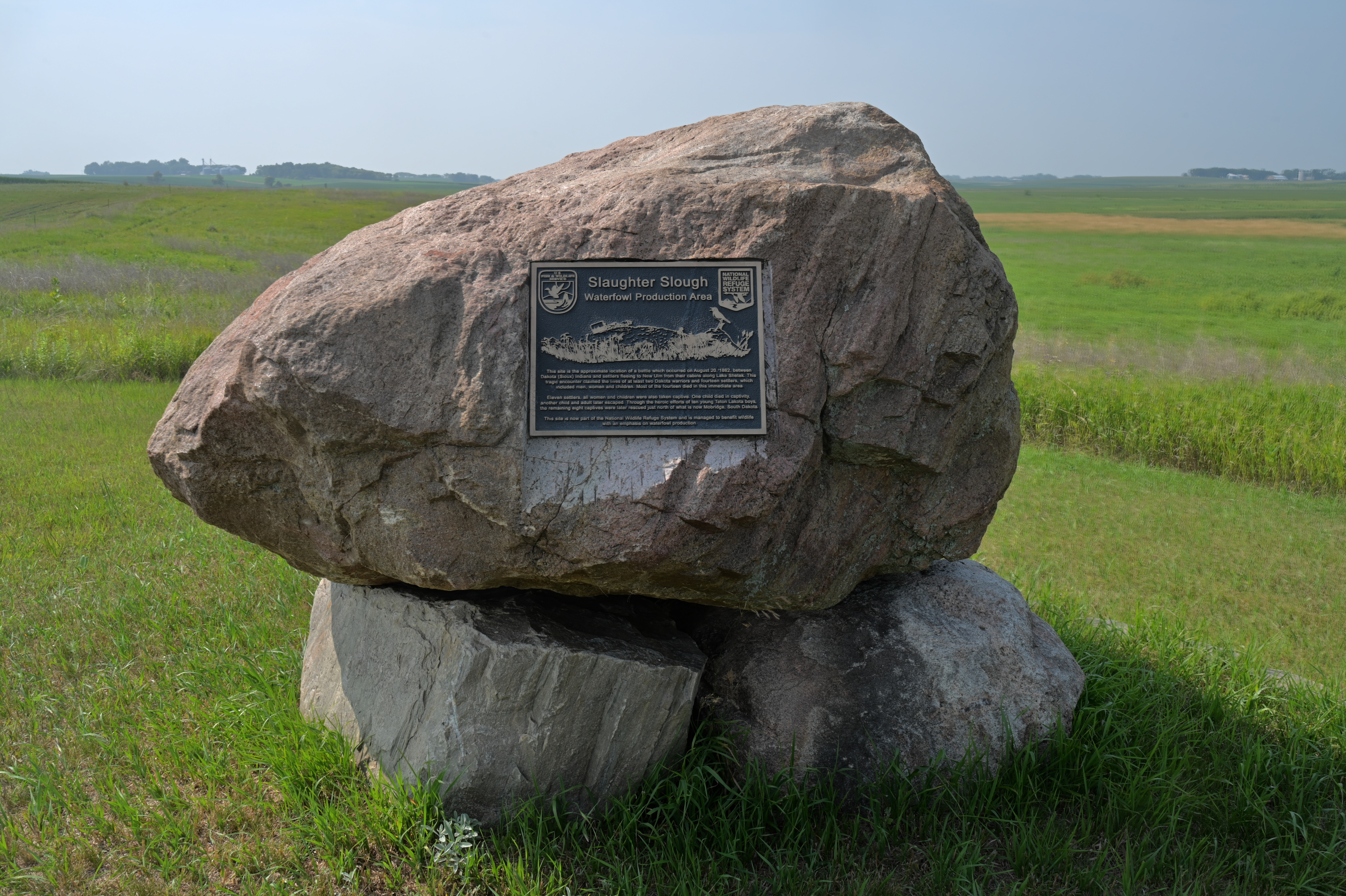
- The memorial cairn at Slaughter Slough
- Location: 44°5′33.28″N 95°37′21.97″W; Lake Shetek Settlement & Slaughter Slough, Minnesota, United States
- Date: August 20, 1862
- Attack type: Indian massacre
- Deaths: 15
- Perpetrator: Sisseton Dakota
- No. of participants: 40

Slaughter Slough is a wetland in southwestern Minnesota, named for being the site of the Lake Shetek Massacre during the Dakota War of 1862. It is located in Murray County east of Lake Shetek. On August 20, 1862, about 25-30 Sisseton warriors and women led by Chief Lean Bear of the Sleepy-Eye band attacked the Euro-American settlers living nearby, killing 15 and taking 3 women and 8 children captive. 21 settlers escaped and made difficult treks across the prairie to safety.

Today the site is managed by the U.S. Fish and Wildlife Service as Slaughter Slough Waterfowl Production Area, a component of the Windom Wetland Management District. It is developed with interpretive signage, a short trail, and a memorial.

== The Lake Shetek settlement ==
About 50 Euro-American settlers from perhaps a dozen families were living along the east shore of Lake Shetek in August 1862. They were quite isolated, 40 miles (64 km) from the nearest settlement and even farther from any sizeable town; it was over 60 miles (97 km) east to New Ulm or 70 miles (110 km) southwest to Sioux Falls.

The first homesteaders arrived in 1855. By 1862 at least 9 families had cabins spread along 5 miles (8.0 km) of lakeshore. Listed roughly north to south they were the Meyers, the Hurds, the Kochs, the Irelands, the Eastlicks, the Duleys, the Smiths, the Wrights, and the Everetts. There were also a few single men.

Prior to the hostilities the settlers had traded with the local eastern Dakota people. Some spoke the Dakota language passably.

== The Dakota ==
The growing Euro-American population, however, was making it increasingly difficult for the easternmost Dakota people to pursue their traditional lifestyle. Resettlement on reservations, treaty violations by the United States, and late or unfair annuity payments by Indian agents caused increasing hunger and hardship among the Dakota. Pushed to the breaking point, a council of Dakota leaders decided to wage war on the whites on August 17, 1862.

The declaration of war reached White Lodge and Lean Grizzly Bear, the chiefs of two bands living northwest of Lake Shetek. Their villages were Sisseton Dakota, a sub-tribe still living outside the reservation. They had not been signatory to any treaties with the United States. About 40 warriors and a few women set out to remove "white" encroachment on their land. A third Sisseton band, headed by Old Pawn, was camped near the Wrights' cabin at the south end of the Lake Shetek settlement.

== The attack ==
On the morning of Wednesday, August 20, 1862, the eastern Dakota entered the settlement from the north. At the first farm they simply trampled through the cornfield and vandalized a fence, leaving the Meyers family perplexed but unharmed. At the next farm, the Hurds', circumstances changed. Phineas Hurd and another settler were long overdue from scouting land in Dakota Territory. Now his wife Alomina recognized that one of the Dakota men was riding her husband's horse. Some of the men followed her into the dwelling, which woke one of her two children. John Voigt, a hired hand, carried the crying toddler outside. Without warning one of the Sisseton killed Voigt while not harming the child. Many more attackers then looted the farm. Mrs. Hurd was told that she and the children would be spared if she didn't warn the other settlers. Refusing them to take provisions, some attackers escorted the Hurds 3 miles (4.8 km) from home and pointed them in the direction of New Ulm.

The Sisseton next arrived at the Andreas and Mariah Koch farm, German immigrants with no children. Andreas was asked to bring water from the well and was then shot from behind. Mariah, emerging from the dwelling, was told to flee, and ran unhindered to a neighbor's.

John Voigt and Andreas Koch were the only people killed within the settlement. Voigt had recently angered some Sisseton, and Koch had poor relations with them due to his broken English. Conversely both Andrew Meyers and Alomina Hurd had been friendly with the Native Americans and spoke their language, which she credited for her and her children being spared. At the beginning of the attack the victims may have been the target of specific grudges.

== The settlers flee ==
Two chance visitors to the Hurd cabin spread the alarm about the coming attack. Charlie Hatch was living with his sister Almira Everett and her family at the south end of the settlement. He went to borrow the Hurds' oxen and found John Voigt's body and the looted dwelling. Running back to tell the others, he saw the Dakota around the Koch farm. Meanwhile, the Meyers cabin at the north end of the settlement had so far been bypassed by the war party. Mrs. Meyers was quite sick with pneumonia, so 10-year-old Arthur had been sent to the Hurds to ask for some bread. When he returned with the news of the violence done there, Mr. Meyers went to warn the Kochs. Instead he found Andreas dead and heard the Sisseton nearby. He rushed to his family getting them into a wagon to flee.

Hatch borrowed a horse to warn the settlement. The settlers decided to gather at the most defensible structure, the two-story Wright house built on higher ground.

As the settlers gathered at the Wright home they encountered Old Pawn and members of his band, who were camped nearby and well known to the whites. Old Pawn offered to fight on their side. The 34 settlers and 8 Dakota crowded into the Wright home and prepared their paltry defenses. The whites argued about strategy and whether they should trust Old Pawn's Dakota men.

The men fired a volley when the Sisseton appeared, and Old Pawn offered to negotiate with them. He returned with this deal: abandon the settlement and their belongings and they would be spared. The settlers argued and ultimately held a vote, accepting the offer. The group started for New Ulm in a wagon and on foot.

After they had gone a mile or two, Old Pawn and the Sisseton appeared behind them in pursuit. Henry Smith and Mr. Rhodes panicked and ran, though William Duley shouted at them to stay or at least leave their guns. Rhodes was a bachelor boarding with the Eastlicks, but Smith abandoned his own wife. Duley suggested the party take cover in a nearby slough, reed-filled and mostly dry in late summer. On the way the parties exchanged fire, and several settlers were wounded. Then came the killing: fifteen settlers, including three of Duley's children. Duley's wife and seven others were taken captive.

Afterwards the bands went west crossing into Yankton land. There Yankton Chief Struck-by-the-Ree offered to trade horses for the captives, but was turned down. Conveying his unhappiness to the Santee they headed north. One hundred miles north of Fort Pierre a fur trader ran into them and offered to trade goods for the captives. He was turned down being informed they would only trade for horses. He continued to Fort Pierre with that information. There a band of Two Kettles Lakota, self named the Strong Hearts, decided to secure their release. They caught up with the Sisseton and offered a horse a piece for the release of each woman and child. They were scoffed at. The Lakota replied either take the horses or fight. They returned the captives to Fort Pierre only to be imprisoned for their effort. Some died awaiting a determination.

== Aftermath ==
Abraham Lincoln authorized the execution of the eastern Dakota involved in the massacres and kidnapping during the uprising, but those involved at Lake Shetek escaped to the plains. William Duley requested to be the executioner in Mankato, December 26, 1862, for the loss of his children. In November Company F of the 25th Wisconsin was tasked with burying the dead at Lake Shetek. They reported finding nine skeletal remains, some of which had been burnt by prairie fires.
