= Lake Shetek =

Lake in the state of Minnesota, United States

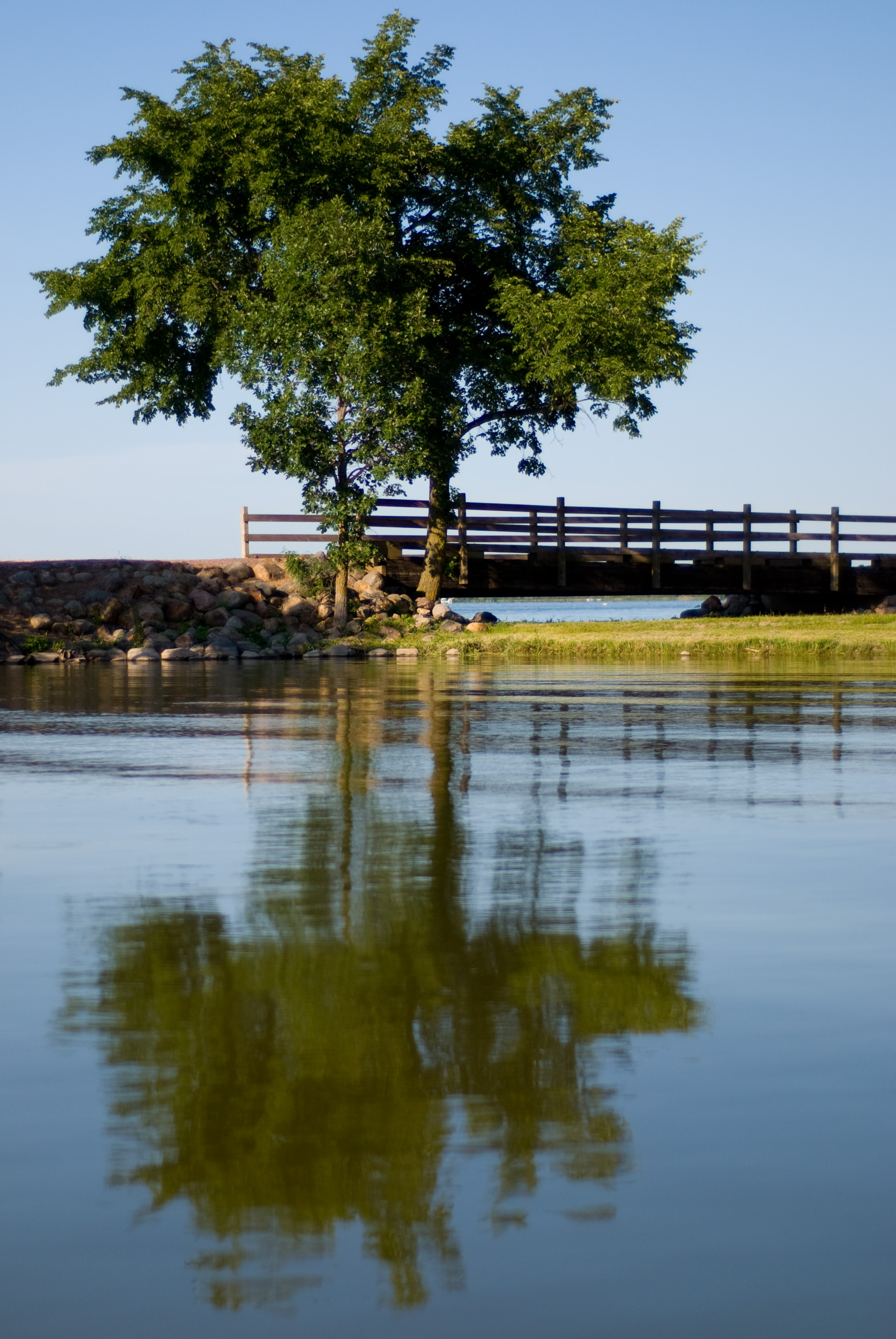
- Lake Shetek from Lake Shetek State Park

- Location within Minnesota Location within the United States
- Location: The Lakes, Murray County, Minnesota
- Coordinates: 44°7′12″N 95°41′24″W
- Type: Glacial lake
- Primary outflows: West Fork of the Des Moines River
- Basin countries: United States
- Surface area: 3,596 acres (1,455 ha)
- Max. depth: 10 feet (3.0 m)
- Shore length^{1}: 31.7 miles (51.0 km)
- Surface elevation: 1,483 feet (452 m)
- Islands: Keeley, Loon, and Valhalla
- Settlements: Currie, Minnesota
- ^{1} Shore length is not a well-defined measure.

Lake Shetek

Lake Shetek is the largest lake in southwestern Minnesota, United States, and the headwaters of the Des Moines River. It is located in The Lakes, an unincorporated community in Murray County a few miles north-northwest of Currie. The name Shetek is derived from "pelican" in the Ojibwe language.

Since large lakes are rare in southwestern Minnesota and for some distance over the borders into Iowa and South Dakota, Lake Shetek is a significant regional draw for water recreation. Lake Shetek State Park lies on its eastern shore.

== Geography ==
Lake Shetek covers 3,596 acres (1,455 ha) to a maximum depth of just 10 feet (3.0 m). This modest depth is wholly typical for the Prairie Pothole Region. The shoreline totals 31.7 miles (51.0 km), about 85% of which is in private development. The watershed-to-lake ratio is 23:1, with much of that watershed under cultivation.

Lake Shetek is by far the largest of Murray County's hundred or so lakes. The next largest is currently 1,176-acre (476 ha) Lake Sarah just to the northwest. Great Oasis Lake at 1,466 acres (593 ha) was once second-largest but was drained in the early 20th century for farmland.

It is the headwaters of the West Fork of the Des Moines River, considered the river's main fork. Lake Shetek contains three main islands: Valhalla, Keeley, and Loon Islands. Causeways connect the first two to the western shore, and another connects the third to the eastern shore. Shetek also connects to Bloody Lake Fremont Lake and Armstrong Slough.

== Geology ==
Lake Shetek and the surrounding landscape of wetlands and rolling hills are the result of glaciation. The lake lies on the Altamont Moraine, a terminal moraine marking the farthest extent of an ice lobe during the Wisconsin glaciation. This most-recent glaciation deposited a very thick blanket of till over the area.

Lake Shetek began forming as the climate started to warm 15,000 years ago. Water from the melting glaciers carved channels into the moraine. Where one channel—now occupied by Beaver Creek—intersected the channel now occupied by the Des Moines River, a buildup of sediment and slumping banks partially dammed the outflow, creating a large, shallow lake.

== Flora and fauna ==
Lake Shetek has long harbored a robust population of rough fish, native but economically undesirable. The Minnesota Department of Natural Resources commenced fish stocking in 1987, introducing game fish such as walleye, northern pike, yellow perch, crappie, sunfish, and black bass.

Aquatic vegetation is sparse, which is typical for lakes in the region. Due to its shallowness, the entire basin constitutes the littoral zone, which harbors common invertebrates like snails and insect larvae.

Five common species of waterfowl all breed on Lake Shetek: the American coot, gadwall, mallard, northern shoveler, and ruddy duck. White pelicans, the lake's namesake, are often seen during migration.

== History ==
The earliest humans around Lake Shetek were likely following the bison that came there to drink. Archaeologists identify the first permanent inhabitants as members of the Great Oasis culture.

French explorer Joseph Nicollet camped beside the lake for three days in 1838. He noted that the region's Dakota people called the lake Rabechy, meaning "place where pelicans nest." However his journals and maps opted for the Ojibwe language equivalent, which was already in use by voyageurs.

Pioneers established a small settlement along the east shore of Lake Shetek in the late 1850s. However the Dakota War of 1862 broke out and 15 settlers were killed and a dozen taken captive at Slaughter Slough. Euro-American settlement was dampened for a while, but within a decade Archibald and Neil Currie built a flour mill and a general store near the lake's outlet, from which grew the town of Currie.

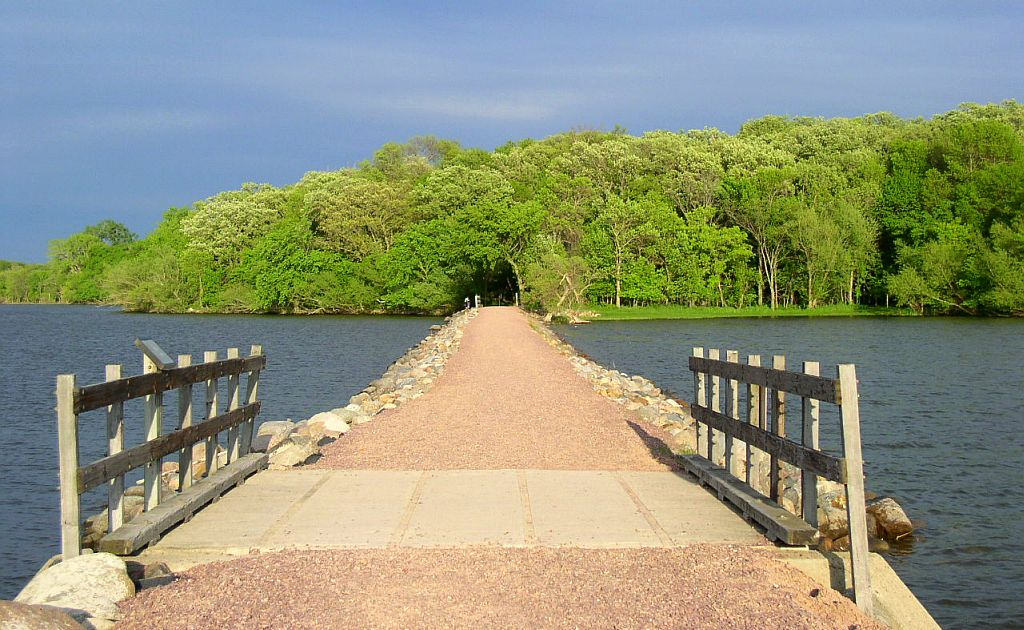
One of the WPA-built causeways

Two summer resorts opened on Lake Shetek in the early 20th century, Tepeeotah on the east shore and Valhalla Pavilion on Valhalla Island. Two excursion boats carried visitors around the lake. To protect fishing and recreation interests, locals prompted the state Game and Fish Department to stabilize the water level with a dam in the mid-1920s. This initial tourist economy peaked in the Roaring Twenties and subsided with Valhalla Pavilion burning down in 1928 and the onset of the Great Depression.

To combat unemployment during the Depression, the federal government authorized several job creation programs to conduct public work projects. The Works Progress Administration (WPA) arrived in 1934 with an ambitious plan to build a road system across Lake Shetek and a state park on the wooded eastern shore. From their camp on Keeley Island the WPA men built five causeways running from island to island. However the program was disbanded in 1940 with the sixth and final causeway incomplete.

The Tepeeotah Resort closed in the 1960s just as housing subdivisions burgeoned around the shore of Lake Shetek. Although the shoreline was greatly developed, better runoff management practices throughout the watershed improved Shetek's water quality.

A portion of the Casey Jones State Trail was constructed in the 1990s between the lake and nearby Currie.

== Issues ==
As a shallow lake with a fairly high watershed-to-basin ratio, Lake Shetek can be strongly affected by environmental issues. Maintaining the water level has been a local concern for decades. The lake was dammed in the 1920s, then raised another 18 inches (46 cm) in the 1930s. Additional improvements were made to the dam in 1966 and 1995.

Siltation from human activities has been slowly filling in the lake. In 1973 Shetek's deepest point was documented at 12 feet (3.7 m) whereas today it is only 10 feet (3.0 m). Surface runoff from farms and lawns threatens to carry in excessive nutrients that can cause algal blooms.

Moreover, the shallow lake freezes solid every seven years on average. This leads to significant winter fishkill, and since rough fish like carp rebound faster than desirable game fish, it has been a struggle to maintain the sport fishery.
