= Fulda, Minnesota =

City in Minnesota, United States

- City
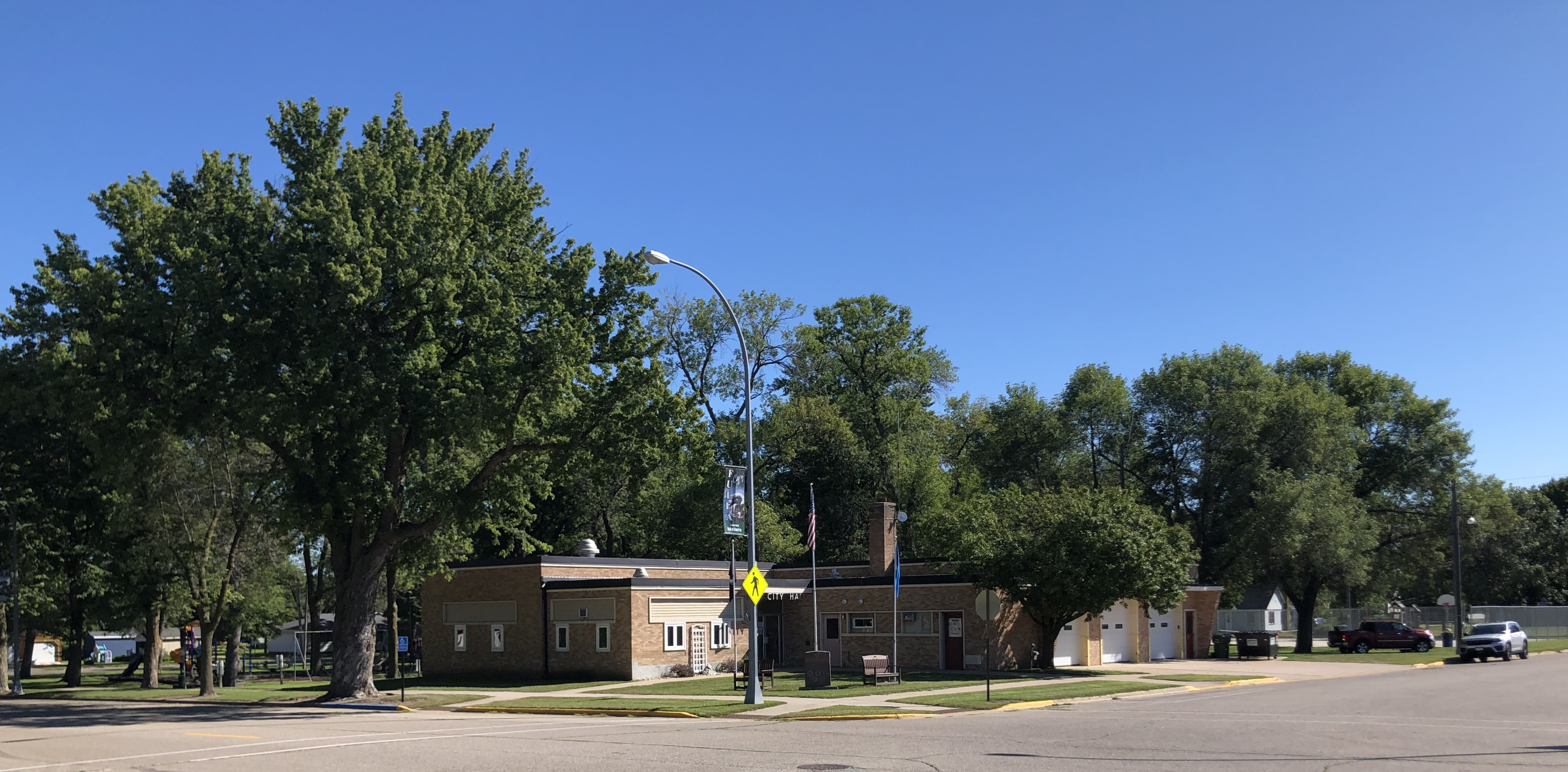
- City Hall & Fire Hall

- Location in Murray County and the state of Minnesota
- Coordinates: 43°52′12″N 95°36′0″W
- Country: United States
- State: Minnesota
- County: Murray
- Founded: 1879

Government
  - Type: Mayor – Council
  - Mayor: John Maertens

Area
  - Total: 1.09 sq mi (2.82 km^{2})
  - Land: 1.01 sq mi (2.62 km^{2})
  - Water: 0.077 sq mi (0.20 km^{2}) 7.21%
- Elevation: 1,522 ft (464 m)

Population (2020)
  - Total: 1,371
  - Density: 1,355.0/sq mi (523.17/km^{2})
- Time zone: UTC-6 (CST)
  - Summer (DST): UTC-5 (CDT)
- ZIP code: 56131
- Area code: 507
- FIPS code: 27-22958
- GNIS feature ID: 0643984
- Website: fuldamn.com

Fulda is a city in Murray County, Minnesota, United States. The population was 1,371 at the 2020 census, up from 1,318 in 2010.

== History ==
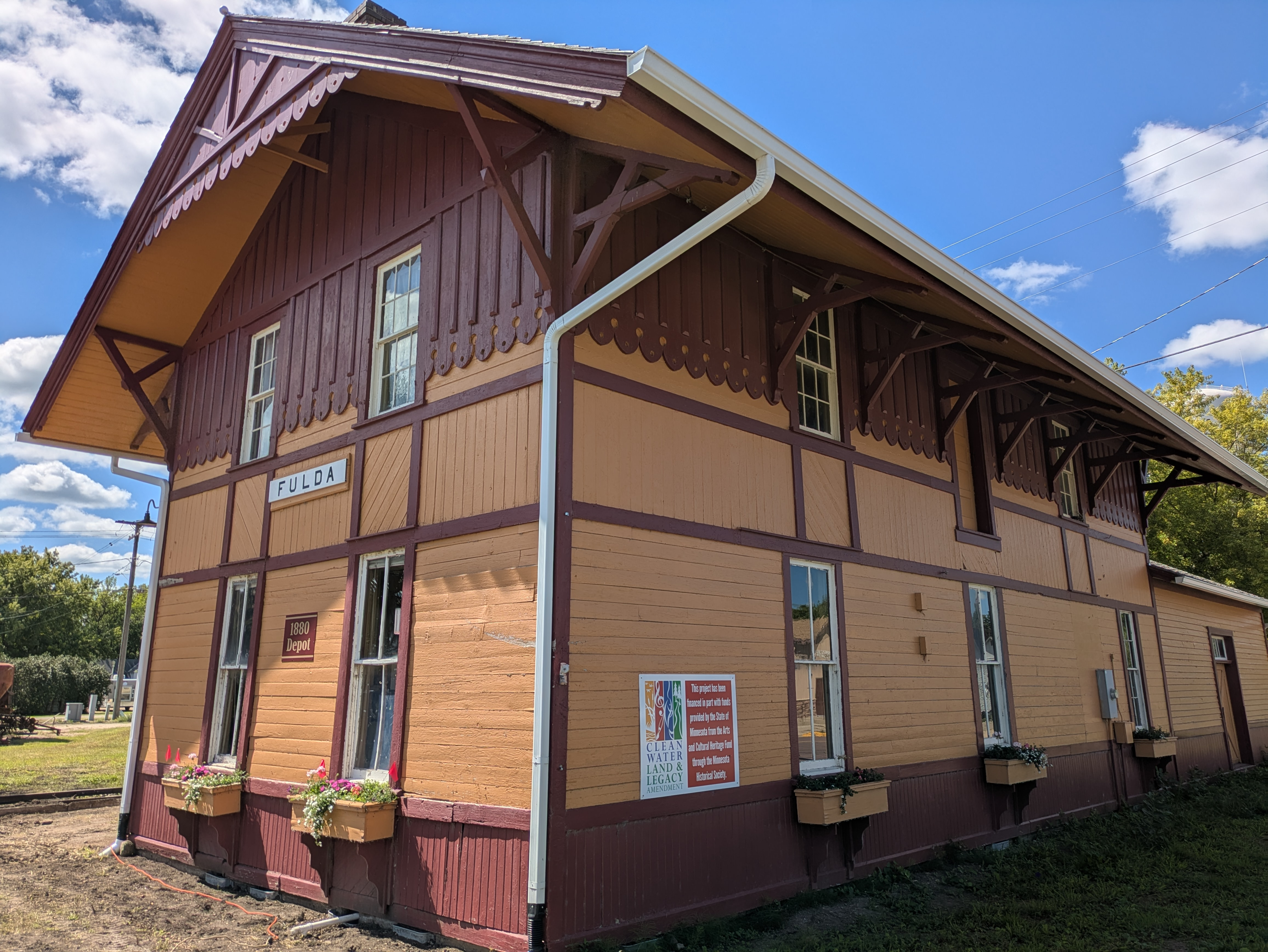
Milwaukee Road depot, built c. 1901, now a museum

The city of Fulda was founded in 1881 along the Milwaukee Road primarily by German settlers, though also by Scandinavians and Irish. It was named for Fulda in Hessen, Germany. Fulda is still predominantly an agricultural community.

Although the rail line was discontinued in 1980, the two-story train depot, along with a section of track, has been preserved and is listed on the National Register of Historic Places. The lower level of the depot is currently used as an antiques museum and store. The other building in the city on the National Register is the former Citizens State Bank.

Fulda has a Civil War cannon in its city park. It is a three-inch (76 mm) rifled gun and was purchased for $155 on June 25, 1892, by the Zach Taylor Post No. 42 of the Grand Army of the Republic.

== Geography ==
Fulda is in southeastern Murray County, surrounded by Bondin Township. U.S. Highway 59 runs along the eastern border of the city, leading northwest 13 miles (21 km) to Slayton, the Murray county seat, and south 17 miles (27 km) to Worthington. Minnesota State Highway 62 has its western terminus at US 59 in Fulda and leads east 25 miles (40 km) to Windom.

According to the U.S. Census Bureau, Fulda has an area of 1.09 square miles (2.82 km^{2}), of which 1.01 square miles (2.62 km^{2}) are land and 0.08 square miles (0.21 km^{2}), or 6.99%, are water. The city is on the north end of Fulda Lake and is in the watershed of the Des Moines River.

=== Neighboring communities ===
- Lime Creek, 2 miles (3.2 km) northeast
- Wirock, 5 miles (8.0 km) west
- Avoca, 6 miles (9.7 km) northwest
- Dundee, 6 miles (9.7 km) east
- Kinbrae, 6 miles (9.7 km) southeast
- Iona, 9 miles (14 km) northwest
- Slayton, 11 miles (18 km) northwest
- Dovray, 13 miles (21 km) north
- Reading, 13 miles (21 km) southwest
- Brewster, 13 miles (21 km) southeast

== Demographics ==
Historical population
Census	Pop.	Note	%±
1880	150		—
1890	348		132.0%
1900	886		154.6%
1910	743		−16.1%
1920	893		20.2%
1930	818		−8.4%
1940	984		20.3%
1950	1,149		16.8%
1960	1,202		4.6%
1970	1,226		2.0%
1980	1,308		6.7%
1990	1,212		−7.3%
2000	1,283		5.9%
2010	1,318		2.7%
2020	1,371		4.0%
U.S. Decennial Census

=== 2010 census ===
As of the census of 2010, there were 1,318 people, 566 households, and 324 families residing in the city. The population density was 1,279.6 inhabitants per square mile (494.1/km^{2}). There were 615 housing units at an average density of 597.1 per square mile (230.5/km^{2}). The racial makeup of the city was 91.7% White, 0.8% African American, 0.2% Native American, 4.2% Asian, 1.5% from other races, and 1.5% from two or more races. Hispanic or Latino of any race were 3.3% of the population.

There were 566 households, of which 23.3% had children under the age of 18 living with them, 47.5% were married couples living together, 6.7% had a female householder with no husband present, 3.0% had a male householder with no wife present, and 42.8% were non-families. 38.5% of all households were made up of individuals, and 22.5% had someone living alone who was 65 years of age or older. The average household size was 2.17 and the average family size was 2.90.

The median age in the city was 46.8 years. 21.8% of residents were under the age of 18; 6.3% were between the ages of 18 and 24; 19.6% were from 25 to 44; 25.9% were from 45 to 64; and 26.5% were 65 years of age or older. The gender makeup of the city was 46.1% male and 53.9% female.

=== 2000 census ===
As of the census of 2000, there were 1,283 people, 528 households, and 328 families residing in the city. The population density was 1,328.3 inhabitants per square mile (512.9/km^{2}). There were 568 housing units at an average density of 588.1 per square mile (227.1/km^{2}). The racial makeup of the city was 96.10% White, 0.08% African American, 0.55% Native American, 0.23% Asian, 2.18% from other races, and 0.86% from two or more races. Hispanic or Latino of any race were 3.27% of the population.

There were 528 households, out of which 26.5% had children under the age of 18 living with them, 54.5% were married couples living together, 4.5% had a female householder with no husband present, and 37.7% were non-families. 35.0% of all households were made up of individuals, and 24.4% had someone living alone who was 65 years of age or older. The average household size was 2.28 and the average family size was 2.94.

In the city, the population was spread out, with 24.0% under the age of 18, 4.8% from 18 to 24, 23.4% from 25 to 44, 18.2% from 45 to 64, and 29.6% who were 65 years of age or older. The median age was 44 years. For every 100 females, there were 83.0 males. For every 100 females age 18 and over, there were 80.2 males.

The median income for a household in the city was $30,000, and the median income for a family was $37,500. Males had a median income of $26,469 versus $18,750 for females. The per capita income for the city was $15,184. About 4.1% of families and 6.1% of the population were below the poverty line, including 4.7% of those under age 18 and 11.2% of those age 65 or over.

== Notable people ==
- John N. Browning, former member of the South Dakota House of Representatives
- The Continental Co-ets, all-female rock band
- Anthony Drealan, former head coach of the Dakota State track and field and cross country teams
- Harold Hotelling, mathematical statistician and economic theorist
- Patrick Reusse, sports columnist for the Minneapolis Star-Tribune
- Ted Winter, former Minnesota House Majority Leader and state representative

== Community and culture ==
Local churches include First Presbyterian Church (PCUSA), Saint Gabriel's Catholic Church, Solid Rock Assembly, and Saint Paul's (LCMS) and Immanuel American (ELCA) Lutheran churches.

Local organizations include American Legion post 318, Boy Scout troop 123, Fish and Game Club, Jaycees, VFW post 9017.

== Education ==
Fulda High School
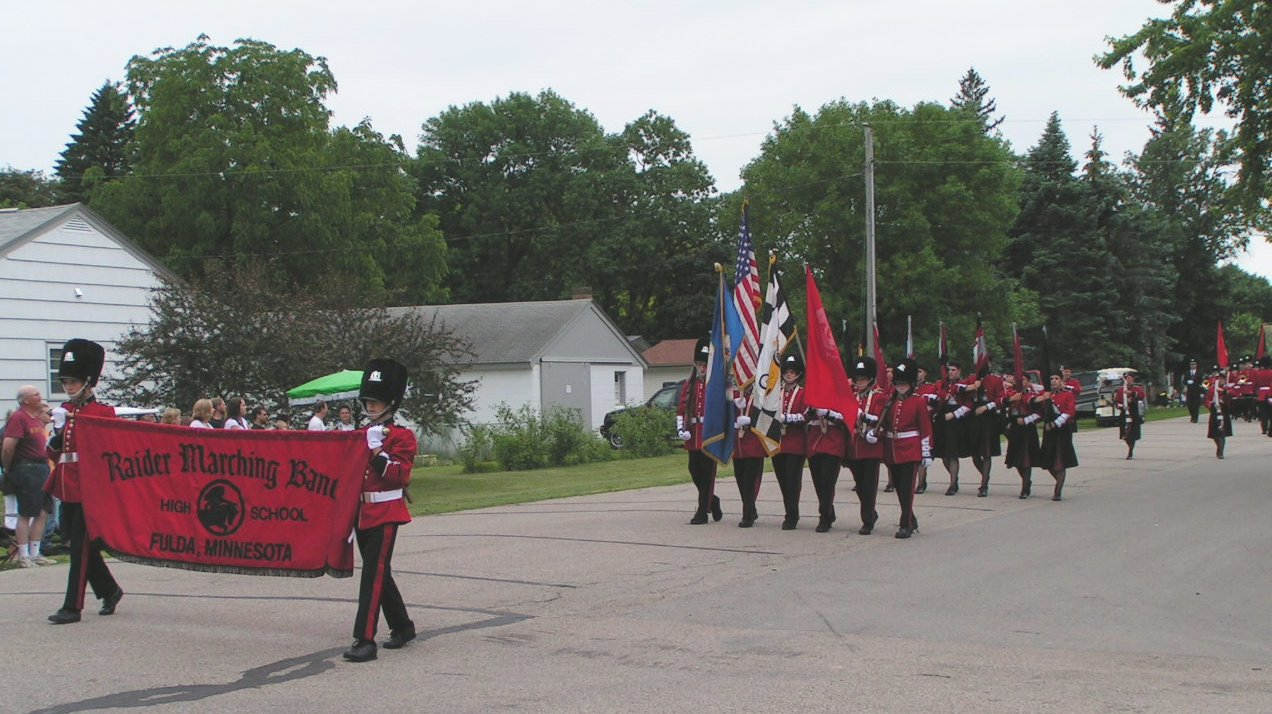
- The FHS Marching Band (2006)
- Fulda, Minnesota; USA

Information
- Type: Public
- Established: 1900
- Principal: Michael Pagel
- Enrollment: 124
- Colors: grey and Black
- Team name: Coyotes
- Rival: Murray County Central High School
- Affiliations: Minnesota State High School League
- Website: www.fps.mntm.org

There are two schools in Fulda, Fulda Elementary and Fulda Secondary (also known as Fulda High School). Formerly operating in Fulda were St. Gabriel's Catholic School and Fulda Lutheran School.

=== Fulda Public Schools ===
Fulda Public Schools consists of Fulda Elementary School and Fulda Secondary School (or Fulda High School). It co-operates many sports with neighboring districts. These include football, girls' basketball, baseball, softball, track and field, and golf with Heron Lake-Okabena, known as the Heron Lake-Okabena/Fulda Coyotes, and wrestling with Murray County Central, known as the Fulda/MCC Warriors. In addition to the youth in Fulda, the school district has students from neighboring communities, including Avoca, Iona, Dundee, Kinbrae, Wilmont, and Reading.

==== Accomplishments ====
- 2006 Class A Girls Basketball Champions
- 2007 Class A Girls Basketball Champions

=== St. Paul's Lutheran School ===
Fulda's Lutheran school closed in 2018 and had been in existence since 1893.

=== Library ===
Fulda Memorial Library is a member of the Plum Creek Library System. It was expanded in 2002.

The Library was founded in 1918 when it started to receive funding from the city, and was located in different businesses. On April 14, 1970, the library building was officially opened across from City Hall. In 1975 the library officially became a member of the Plum Creek Library System. In 1977 the Friends of the Library group was formed to raise funds for the library.

== Politics ==
Fulda is in Minnesota's 7th congressional district, represented by Michelle Fischbach. At the state level, Fulda is in Senate District 21 and in House District 21A, represented by Joe Schomacker.

== Gallery ==
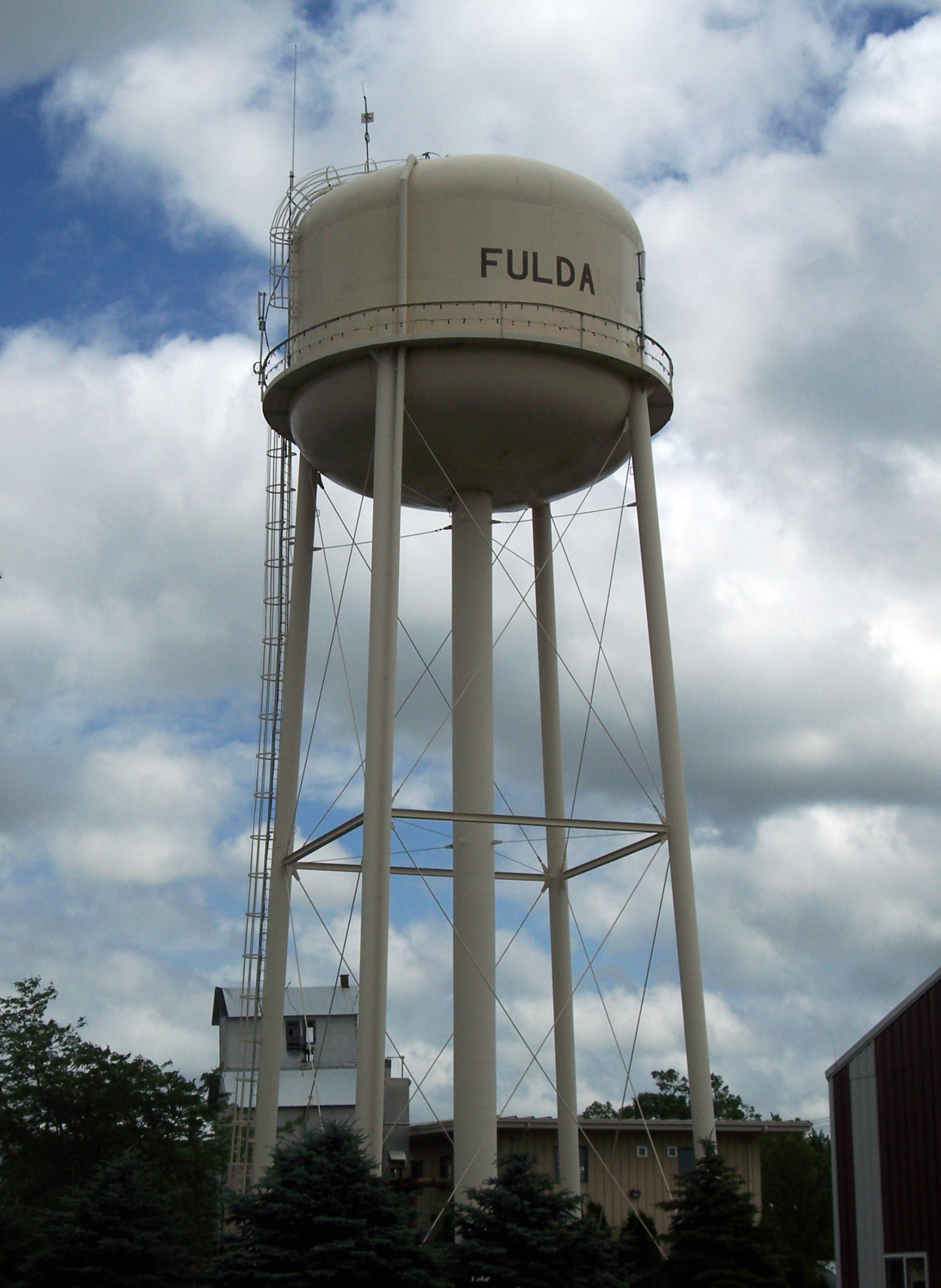
Water Tower

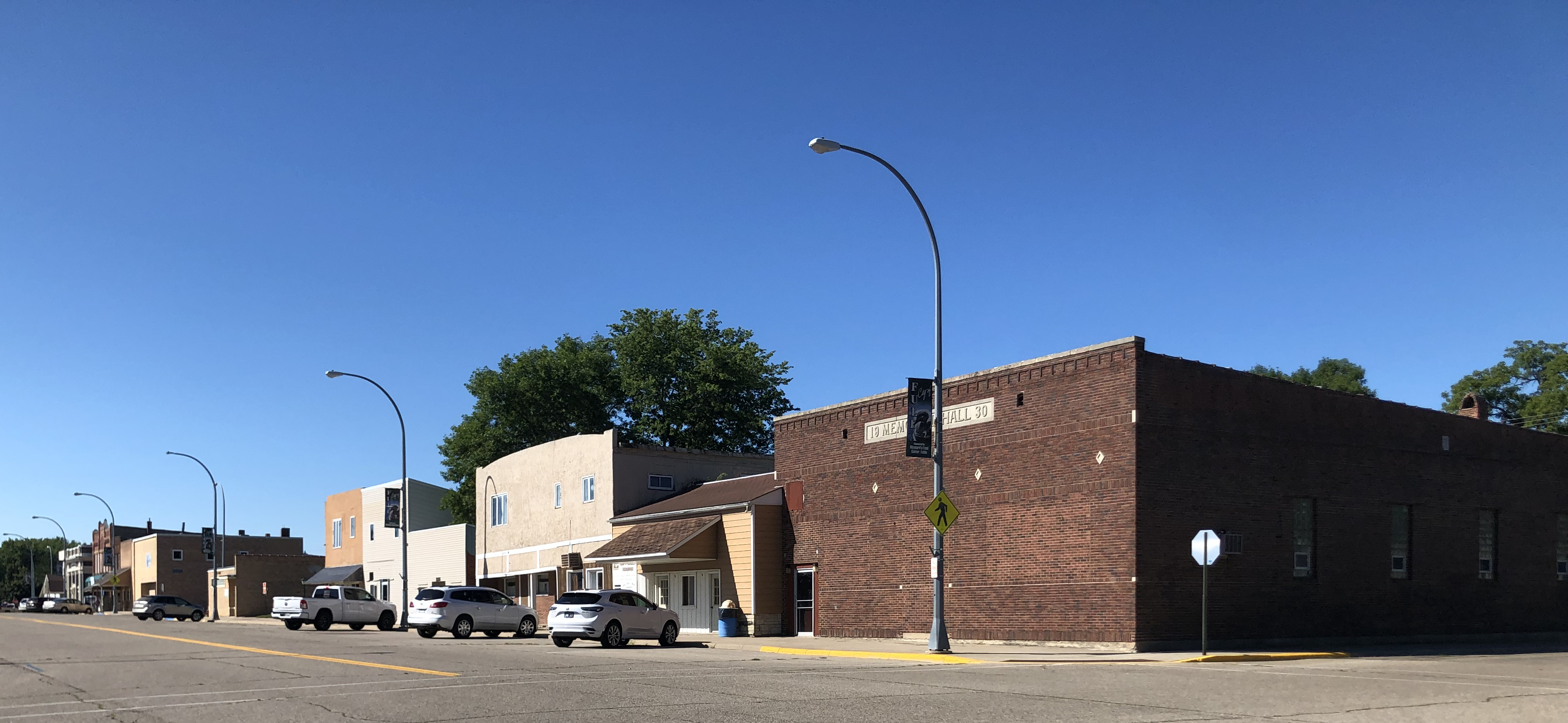
N St. Paul Avenue at NW Third Street

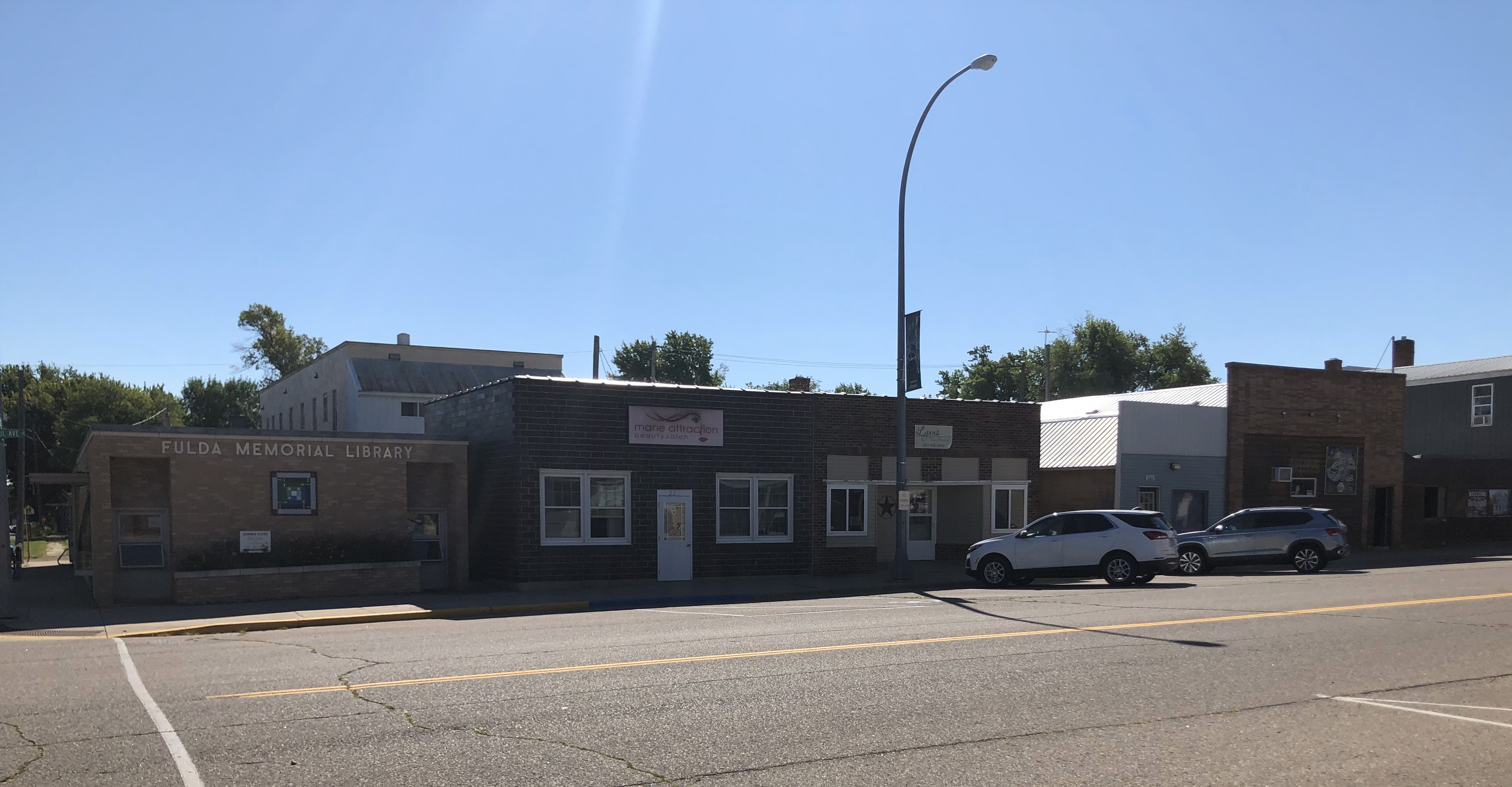
Fulda Memorial Library on N St. Paul Avenue

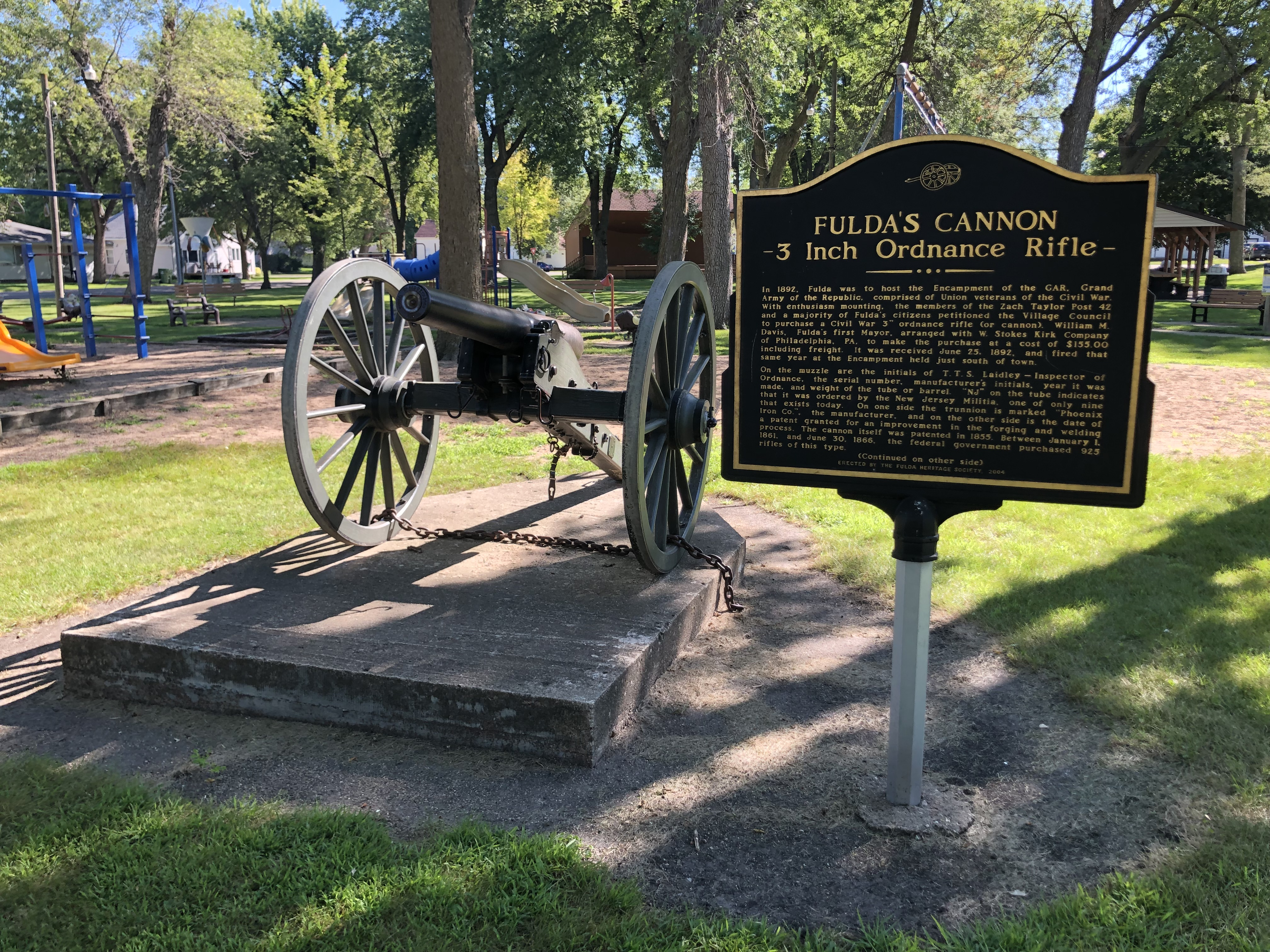
Cannon in city park
