= Graham Lake =

Graham Lake, Graham Lakes, or Lake Graham may refer to:

== People ==
- Graham Lake (cricketer) (born 1935), retired British scientist and former English professional cricketer
- Graham Lake, 10th Baronet (1923–2013), one of the Lake baronets

== Lakes ==
- Graham Lake (Maine)
- Graham Lakes (Minnesota)
- Graham Lakes Township, Nobles County, Minnesota
- Lake Graham (Tennessee), site of a regional headquarters of the Tennessee Wildlife Resources Agency
- Lake Graham (Texas), a lake of Texas
