= 1949 Sioux Falls mayoral election =

- April 19, 1949; April 26, 1949

Candidate	Henry Saure	John N. Browning
Party	Nonpartisan	Nonpartisan
First round	5,634; 42.49%	3,784; 28.53%
Runoff	7,874; 50.80%	7,625; 49.20%
Candidate	C. M. Whitfield	Ellis O. Smith
Party	Nonpartisan	Nonpartisan
First round	2,720; 20.51%	758; 5.72%
Runoff	Eliminated	Eliminated
Mayor before election
C. M. Whitfield
Nonpartisan
Elected mayor
Henry Saure
Nonpartisan

The 1949 Sioux Falls mayoral election was held on April 26, 1949, following a primary election on April 19, 1949. Incumbent Mayor C. M. Whitfield ran for re-election to a second term. However, Whitfield was defeated in the primary election, placing third. Henry Saure, the President of the Sioux Falls Board of Education, who received 42 percent of the vote, and former State Representative John N. Browning, who received 29 percent of the vote, advanced to the general election. Saure narrowly defeated Browning, 51–49 percent, winning his first term as Mayor.

== Primary election ==
=== Candidates ===
- Henry Saure, President of the Sioux Falls Board of Education
- John N. Browning, former State Representative, 1939 and 1942 candidate for Mayor
- C. M. Whitfield, incumbent Mayor
- Ellis O. Smith, former City Commissioner
- O. F. Torrey, water and plumbing supply dealer, former police officer
- Orville R. Beck, bartender
- Jess Borneman, restaurant manager

=== Results ===
1949 Sioux Falls mayoral primary election
Party	Candidate	Votes	%
Nonpartisan	Henry Saure	5,634	42.49%
Nonpartisan	John N. Browning	3,784	28.53%
Nonpartisan	C. M. Whitfield (inc.)	2,720	20.51%
Nonpartisan	Ellis O. Smith	758	5.72%
Nonpartisan	O. F. Torrey	207	1.56%
Nonpartisan	Orville R. Beck	105	0.79%
Nonpartisan	Jess Borneman	53	0.40%
Total votes		13,261	100.00%

== General election ==
=== Results ===
1949 Sioux Falls mayoral runoff election
Party	Candidate	Votes	%
Nonpartisan	Henry Saure	7,874	50.80%
Nonpartisan	John N. Browning	7,625	49.20%
Total votes		15,499	100.00%
