= Murray County Central School District =

Murray County Central High School
- Slayton, Minnesota; USA

Information
- Type: Public
- Established: c. 1895
- Superintendent: Joe Meyer
- Principal: Jake Scandrett (Central), Patrick Freeman(West)
- Staff: 62 (Central)
- Enrollment: 189
- Colors: Purple, Black, and Silver
- Mascot: Rudy the Rebel
- Rival: Fulda High School
- Affiliations: Minnesota State High School League

Murray County Central (MCC) is a school district in southwestern Minnesota. Both the elementary school (West), and the high school (Central) are located in Slayton. The high school was known for much of its history as Slayton High School; this officially changed when the district consolidated in 1992, bringing in students from many of the surrounding communities, including Avoca, Chandler, Currie, Iona, and Lake Wilson. The high school currently houses grades seven through twelve as well as the kindergarten and first grade students. Those in grades two through six attend West Elementary.

== Current administration ==
The current administrative leadership for the 2017-2018 school year is as follows:

- High School Principal: Jake Scandrett
- Elementary Principal: Patrick Freeman
- ISD #2169 Superintendent: Joe Meyer

== Academics ==
=== Academic system ===
Murray County Central runs on a semester schedule. Students' days are broken down into four blocks, with one of the blocks consisting of two "skinny" classes. The core requirement subjects that all students must take include social studies (civics, American history, and economics), mathematics (algebra, geometry, trigonometry, statistics, and calculus), English (American, British, or mythological literature and ACT-prep grammar), natural and biological sciences, technology, art, personal health, and a foreign language. Currently, Spanish is the only foreign language offered to students. Other than core subjects, students are free to choose a variety of elective courses to take throughout their time at school. These electives include classes in music (instrumental and choral), fashion and interior design, food preparation, wood and metal working, business and agriculture.

=== Technology ===
Both Central High School and West Elementary incorporate cutting-edge technology into their classrooms. The high school maintains four separate computer labs holding both Apple and PC computers. West Elementary maintains two such computers labs. Both buildings operate several portable laptop and Apple iPad labs. Furthermore, all classrooms in both buildings are equipped with Smart Board technology that allows students to better engage with their learnings.

=== Rankings ===
Murray County Central students consistently test among the highest in the state of Minnesota. In 2005, the high school was recorded to have a 90% proficiency level in mathematics and an 85% proficiency level in reading, both of which placed the school first in the state. For the 2007-2008 school year, Murray County Central's elementary school was named a Minnesota School of Excellence, one of only eight in the state to be honored.

=== College Now program ===
Qualifying students who meet the necessary grade requisites are able to enroll in college-level courses through Southwest Minnesota State University in nearby Marshall, Minnesota. The program allows high school students to earn college credit and experience in a university classroom before graduating. College-level courses offered at Murray County Central include algebraic mathematics, calculus, chemistry, physics, English literature and composition, Spanish language, sociology, art, and public speaking, among others.

== Extracurricular activities ==
All students at Murray County Central are offered the opportunity to join one or several athletic or extracurricular teams. For middle and high school athletics, students have the option to participate in football, Basketball, Track and Field, Baseball, Cross Country, Golf, Wrestling, Dance, Cheerleading, and Volleyball. Further extracurricular activities offered by the school include Knowledge Bowl, Speech, Theatre, Math Masters, FFA, Student Council, Concert Choir, Rebel Voices, and several instrumental groups, including Marching band, Concert band, Pep band, Orchestra, and Jazz band.

=== MCC Marching Rebels ===
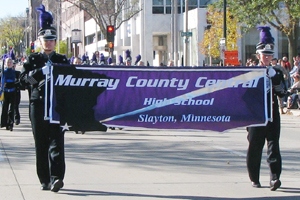
MCC Marching Rebels in 2011.

Murray County Central's marching band competes in multiple competitions throughout the Midwest. In 2009 the band traveled to Walt Disney World in Orlando, Florida, and marched in the famous Walt Disney World Parade. In 2010 the group received a first-place ranking at the Tri-State Band Festival held in Luverne, Minnesota, as well as a second-place ranking at the Festival of Bands Competition in Sioux Falls, South Dakota, placing as the highest ranked public school in Class A competition. Since 2012 the band has been under the direction of Michael Helgeson.

=== MCC Rebel Speech ===
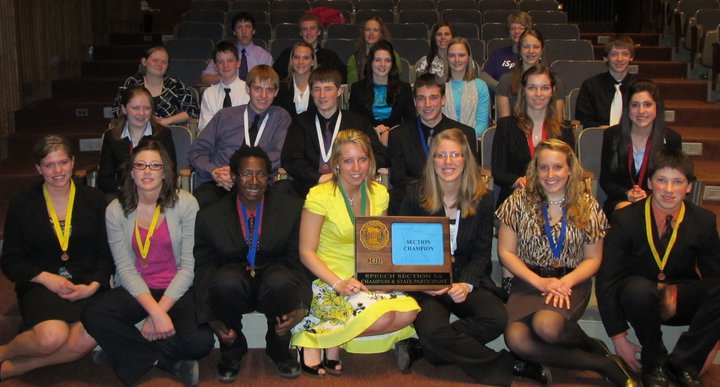
MCC was named the 2011 Section 3A Speech Champions.

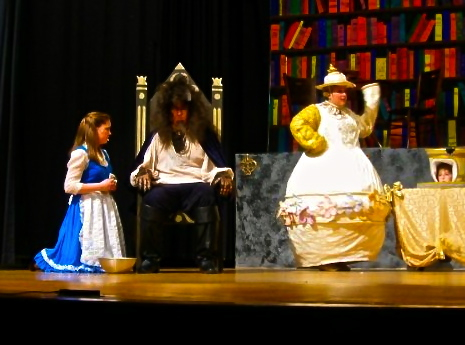
MCC's drama department performed "Beauty and the Beast" in 2009.

The high school's competitive speaking team has claimed the top spot at the Section 3A competition in 2009, 2010, 2011, and 2012. The team has included several competitors who placed among the top speakers in the state. In 2010, students Dan Beech and Molly Bass placed 8th and 4th, respectively. In 2011, MCC brought seven students to the MSHSL State Speech Tournament that was held in Chanhassen, Minnesota. Ryan Gullickson and Jessica Petersen earned spots in the Championship Round, eventually placing 4th and 7th, respectively. In 2012, students Emily Alston and Logan Boese placed 7th and 5th in their respective categories. Also James Dahlgren and Max Whitehead placed 7th in Duo Interpretation. Rachel Lassen claimed the third place medal in 2013. From 2011-2013 the team has been coached by Head Coach Karen Hildebrandt and assisted by Tina Bengston and Kristen St. John. In the 2013-2014 academic year, Sharon Johnson replaced Tina Bengston as one of the team's coaches.

== Mascot ==
Rudy the Rebel cartoonish character figure came from and was modeled after the Western trailblazers of the 1800’s who ventured to discover resources and build communities.
