= 1944 Sioux Falls mayoral election =

- April 18, 1944

Candidate	C. M. Whitfield	Mark Myers
Party	Nonpartisan	Nonpartisan
Popular vote	4,651	2,482
Percentage	65.20%	34.80%
Mayor before election
C. M. Whitfield
Nonpartisan
Elected mayor
C. M. Whitfield
Nonpartisan

The 1944 Sioux Falls mayoral election was held on April 18, 1944. Incumbent Mayor C. M. Whitfield, who was first elected in a 1942 special election, ran for re-election to a full term. He was challenged by Mark Myers, a former State Representative who worked as the janitor at city hall. Whitfield defeated Myers in a landslide, 65–35 percent.

== Candidates ==
- C. M. Whitfield, incumbent Mayor
- Mark Myers, janitor, former State Representative, former Gregory County Register of Deeds

== Results ==
1944 Sioux Falls mayoral primary election
Party	Candidate	Votes	%
Nonpartisan	C. M. Whitfield (inc.)	4,651	65.20%
Nonpartisan	Mark Myers	2,482	34.80%
Total votes		7,133	100.00%
