= Graham Lakes (Minnesota) =

Pair of lakes in the state of Minnesota, United States

- Children wading in Graham Lakes in this 1905 photograph by Emil King

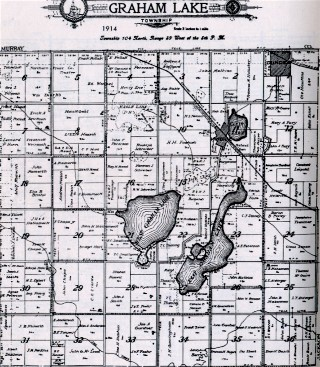
- Map of Graham Lakes Township, 1914

- Location within Minnesota
- Location: Nobles County, Minnesota
- Coordinates: 43°47′35″N 95°30′31″W
- Type: Glacial lakes
- Primary inflows: Several small creeks
- Max. length: West Graham Lake 3/4 mile (1.2 km) - East Graham Lake 1 1/2 miles (2.4 km)
- Max. width: West Graham Lake 1/2 mile (0.80 km) - East Graham Lake 1/2 mile (0.80 km)
- Surface area: West Graham Lake 519.28 acres (210.15 ha) - East Graham Lake 511.32 acres (206.92 ha)
- Average depth: 7 ft (2.1 m)
- Max. depth: 8 ft (2.4 m)
- Water volume: 10,000 US gal (38,000 L; 8,300 imp gal)
- Shore length^{1}: 3 mi (4.8 km)
- Surface elevation: West Graham Lake 1,438.6 feet (438.5 m) - East Graham Lake 1,435 feet (437 m)
- Islands: 2 Rock Piles
- ^{1} Shore length is not a well-defined measure.

The Graham Lakes are a pair of lakes located in the northeastern corner of Nobles County, Minnesota. The lakes are known as West Graham Lake and East Graham Lake. West Graham Lake is an oval shaped body of water that extends east-to-west slightly more than one mile (1.6 km). The north-to-south width of the lake is approximately 3/4 of a mile. The area of West Graham Lake is 519.28 acres (2.1015 km^{2}), the average depth is 5 feet (1.5 m), and the maximum depth is 8 feet (2.4 m). The elevation of West Graham Lake is 1,438.7 feet (438.5 m), or 438.52 meters. East Graham Lake is a longer, narrower lake that extends from northeast-to-southwest for 1 1/2 miles. Its width is less than 1/2 mile. The area of East Graham Lake is 511.32 acres (2.0692 km^{2}), the average depth is 5 feet (1.5 m), and the maximum depth is 8 feet (2.4 m). The elevation of East Graham Lake is 1,435.08 feet (437.41 m), or 437.41 meters. A small creek runs from West Graham Lake and empties into East Graham Lake. Another creek runs from East Graham Lake, and eventually flows into the Des Moines River.

== History ==
Stephen Muck built a cabin on West Graham Lake in 1867 and became the first permanent resident of Nobles County

In the month of May, 1867, a pioneer named Stephen Muck pushed out into the unsettled Graham Lakes region and squatted on land on the bank of West Graham Lake. When surveyed, this land proved to be on section 22 of Graham Lakes Township. There he built a log structure from timber growing near the lake, the first house of wood in the county. In the fall of 1867, Muck brought his family from Jackson County, Minnesota. He earned his livelihood by trapping for a few years, then turned to farming. He lived continuously on his farm from 1867 until the time of his death in 1897. Stephen Muck was the first permanent resident of Nobles County.

The first town to appear on any map of Nobles County was a curious place called Gretchtown. According to an 1856 map - a map drawn 11 years before the arrival of Stephen Muck - Gretchtown was located on the south bank of West Graham Lake, very near to Muck's claim. Rumors of a railroad to be built through southwestern Minnesota had circulated in the 1850s, and even though no survey had been taken for the railroad, the town of Gretchtown had been created - at least on paper - to serve as a stopping point. When Nobles County was formally created by the Minnesota legislature on May 23, 1857, Gretchtown was briefly designated as the county seat of Nobles County, an imaginary county seat for a county that, at that time, had no residents.

When a route for the St. Paul and Sioux City Railway was surveyed in 1871, it was located far south of the Graham Lakes region. No towns or villages existed in Graham Lakes Township until 1879 when Kinbrae and Dundee were established. Neither town grew beyond a few hundred residents. Thus, the Graham Lakes region has remained entirely rural, and the lake shores of both East Graham Lake and West Graham Lake remain undeveloped.

These lakes were first noted on Joseph Nicollet's 1842 map based upon his explorations of the late 1830s and early 1840s. Nicollet named the lakes after Joseph Duncan Graham. Graham served as a commissioner for the survey of the northeast segment of the boundary between the United States and Canada from 1840 until 1843.

== Fishing ==
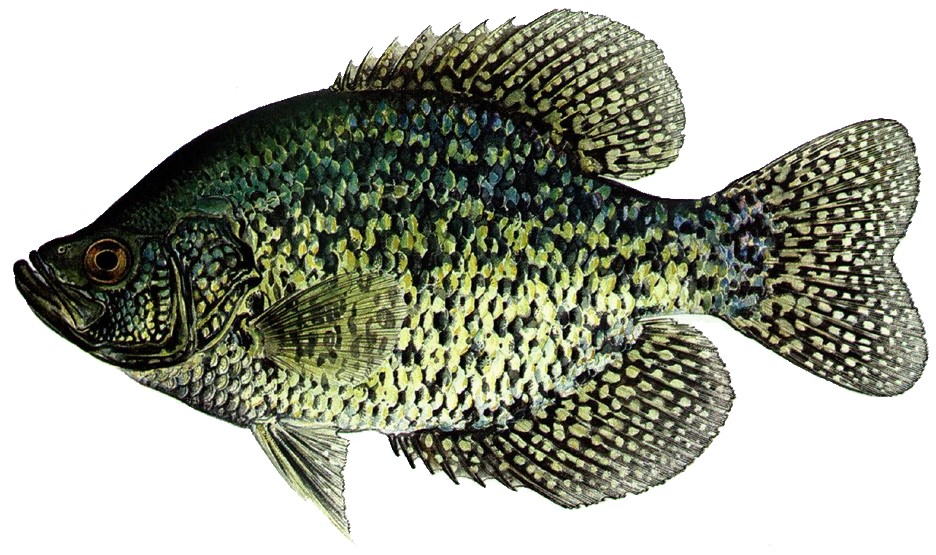
Black Crappies are abundant in Graham Lakes

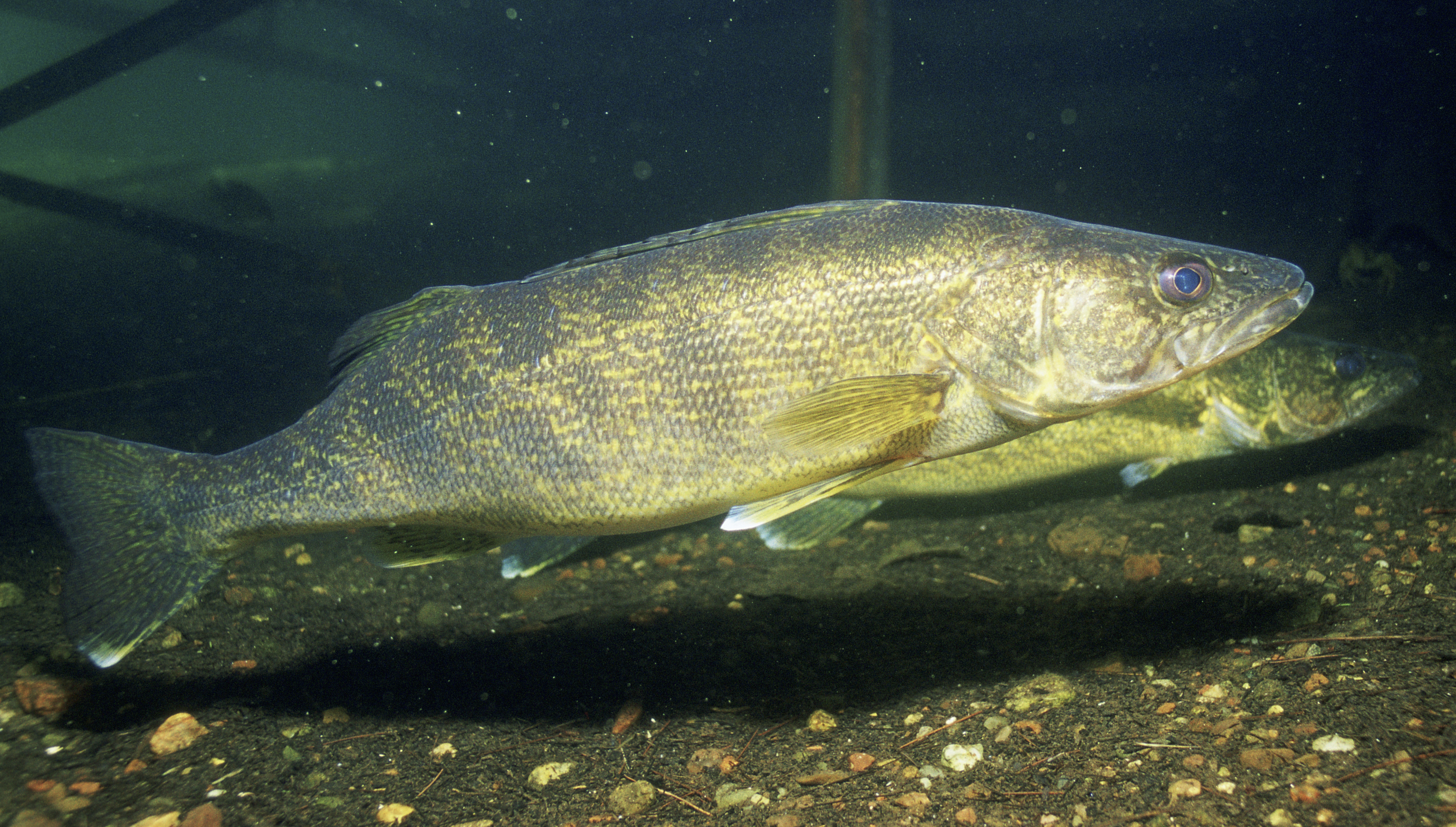
Walleye can be caught in the Graham Lakes

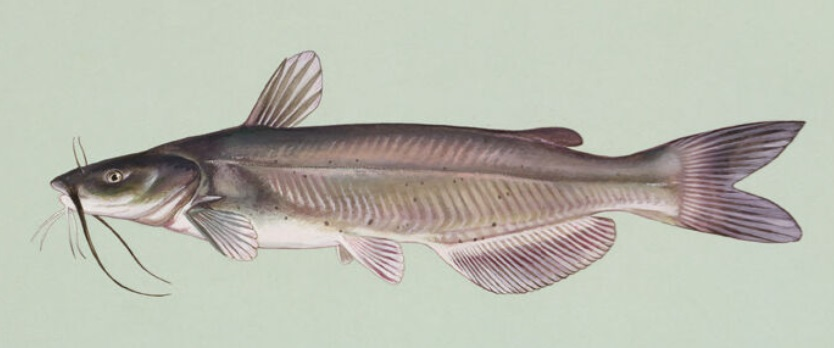
West Graham Lake is managed for channel catfish

Graham Lakes are known as exceptionally good fishing lakes. East Graham is managed primarily for walleye and northern pike and secondarily for black crappie and yellow perch. A population assessment was conducted during the week of June 4, 2007 using 3 gill nets and 8 trap nets. Black Crappies ranged from 7.4 inches (190 mm) to 13.0 inches (330 mm), and their numbers were the highest since sampling of the lake has been conducted. Northern Pike ranged from 17.6 inches (450 mm) to 30 inches (760 mm). Walleye were also abundant, and 59% of those sampled were 14 inches (360 mm) or greater. Most fish from East Graham Lake are safe to eat. However, pregnant women, women who may become pregnant and children under age 15 are advised to refrain from eating walleye more than once per week due to mercury levels. West Graham is primarily managed for walleye with black crappie and channel catfish as secondary species. Walleye fry and fingerlings are stocked in successive years, with the third year left blank. A population assessment conducted on June 4, 2007 found that walleye range from 6.9 to 20 inches (510 mm) in length. Black crappies range from 5.8 inches (150 mm) to 11.9 inches (300 mm). The average black crappie swimming in West Graham Lake is thought to be nearly 1/2 pound. Channel catfish average 13.3 inches (340 mm). There are no advisories for consumption of fish from West Graham Lake.

== Public Access ==
Fury Island and Maka-Oicu County Parks are located on East and West Graham Lakes. Maka-Oicu County Park is located on the northeast shore of West Graham Lake and provides for camping, lake access, natural areas, swimming beach, picnic areas, historic site and general park activities. The park has on-site showers, a large picnic shelter for reunions and gatherings. Maka-Oicu Park also has a one-room cabin with four padded bunks, a table inside and a small refrigerator. Campers have access to electricity and a water supply. Maka-Oicu Park consists of 46 acres (190,000 m^{2}) of developed land. Fury's Island County Park is located on the west side of East Graham Lake, and provides for camping, natural areas, lake access, showers, a large picnic shelter for gatherings, and also has a playground for the little ones. Fury's Island Park is one mile (1.6 km) south of Maka-Oicu County Park and consists of 10 acres (40,000 m^{2}) of developed land.
