= Graham Lakes Township, Nobles County, Minnesota =

Graham Lakes Township, Minnesota
- Township
- Location within the state of Minnesota Graham Lakes Township, Minnesota (the United States)
- Coordinates: 43°47′35″N 95°30′31″W
- Country: United States
- State: Minnesota
- County: Nobles

Area
  - Total: 34.8 sq mi (90.1 km^{2})
  - Land: 33.0 sq mi (85.5 km^{2})
  - Water: 1.8 sq mi (4.7 km^{2})
- Elevation: 1,437 ft (438 m)

Population (2000)
  - Total: 251
  - Density: 7.5/sq mi (2.9/km^{2})
- Time zone: UTC-6 (Central (CST))
  - Summer (DST): UTC-5 (CDT)
- FIPS code: 27-24848
- GNIS feature ID: 0664308

Graham Lakes Township is a township in Nobles County, Minnesota, United States. The population was 251 at the 2000 census.

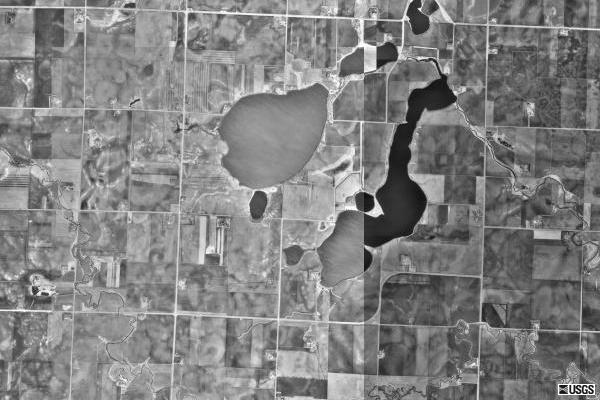
Satellite Photo of Graham Lakes, MN

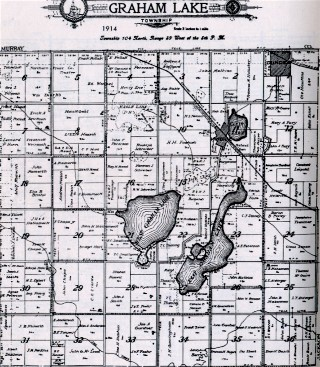
Map of Graham Lakes Township, 1914

== Geography ==
According to the United States Census Bureau, the township has a total area of 34.8 square miles (90 km^{2}), of which 33.0 square miles (85 km^{2}) is land and 1.8 square miles (4.7 km^{2}) (5.20%) is water. The major geographic features in Graham Lakes Township include East Graham Lake, West Graham Lake, Jack Lake, and Kinbrae Lake.

Main highways include:

- Nobles County Road 1
- Nobles County Road 3
- Nobles County Road 16
- Nobles County Road 18

== History ==
Stephen Muck, first settler in Nobles County

Picnic at Graham Lakes 1905 - Photo by Luther King

Organization of Graham Lakes Township was approved by the Nobles County Board on April 11, 1871. The first township meeting occurred April 21, 1871. The township was named for East Graham Lake and West Graham Lake which are entirely within the township's borders. These lakes were first noted on Joseph Nicollet's 1842 map based upon his explorations of the late 1830s and early 1840s. Nicollet named the lakes after Joseph Duncan Graham. Graham served as a commissioner for the survey of the northeast segment of the boundary between the United States and Canada from 1840 until 1843.

In the month of May, 1867, a pioneer named Stephen Muck pushed out into the unsettled Graham Lakes region and squatted on land on the bank of West Graham Lake. When surveyed, this land proved to be on section 22 of Graham Lakes Township. There he built a log structure from timber growing near the lake, the first house of wood in the county. In the fall of 1867, Muck brought his family from Jackson County, Minnesota. He earned his livelihood by trapping for a few years, then turned to farming. He lived continuously on his farm from 1867 until the time of his death in 1897. Stephen Muck was the very first permanent resident of Nobles County.

The first town to appear on any map of Nobles County was a curious place called Gretchtown. According to an 1856 map - a map drawn 11 years before the arrival of Stephen Muck - Gretchtown was located on the south bank of West Graham Lake, very near to Muck's claim. Rumors of a railroad to be built through southwestern Minnesota had circulated in the 1850s, and even though no survey had been taken for the railroad, the town of Gretchtown had been created - at least on paper - to serve as a stopping point. When Nobles County was formally created by the Minnesota legislature on May 23, 1857, Gretchtown was briefly designated as the county seat of Nobles County, a county at that time without any residents.

When a route for the St. Paul and Sioux City Railway was surveyed in 1871, it was located far south of the Graham Lakes region. No towns or villages existed in Graham Lakes Township until 1879 when Kinbrae and Dundee were established. Neither town grew beyond a few hundred residents. Thus, the Graham Lakes region has remained entirely rural, and the lake shores of both East Graham Lake and West Graham Lake remain undeveloped.

== Demographics ==
As of the census of 2000, there were 251 people, 86 households, and 66 families residing in the township. The population density was 7.6 inhabitants per square mile (2.9/km^{2}). There were 93 housing units at an average density of 2.8 per square mile (1.1/km^{2}). The racial makeup of the township was 99.60% White, and 0.40% from two or more races.

There were 86 households, out of which 39.5% had children under the age of 18 living with them, 76.7% were married couples living together, and 22.1% were non-families. 19.8% of all households were made up of individuals, and 10.5% had someone living alone who was 65 years of age or older. The average household size was 2.92 and the average family size was 3.42.

In the township the population was spread out, with 33.9% under the age of 18, 4.0% from 18 to 24, 25.9% from 25 to 44, 24.7% from 45 to 64, and 11.6% who were 65 years of age or older. The median age was 38 years. For every 100 females, there were 93.1 males. For every 100 females age 18 and over, there were 93.0 males.

The median income for a household in the township was $36,750, and the median income for a family was $46,250. Males had a median income of $35,000 versus $23,125 for females. The per capita income for the township was $16,233. About 17.5% of families and 24.3% of the population were below the poverty line, including 37.8% of those under the age of eighteen and 14.3% of those 65 or over.

== Politics ==
Graham Lakes Township is located in Minnesota's 1st congressional district, represented by Mankato educator Tim Walz, a Democrat. At the state level, Graham Lakes Township is located in Senate District 22, represented by Republican Doug Magnus, and in House District 22A, represented by Republican Joe Schomacker.

== Local politics ==
Graham Lakes Township is represented by Nobles County Commissioner Justin Ahlers.
