= Fulda Depot Museum =

Museum and historic building in Fulda, Minnesota

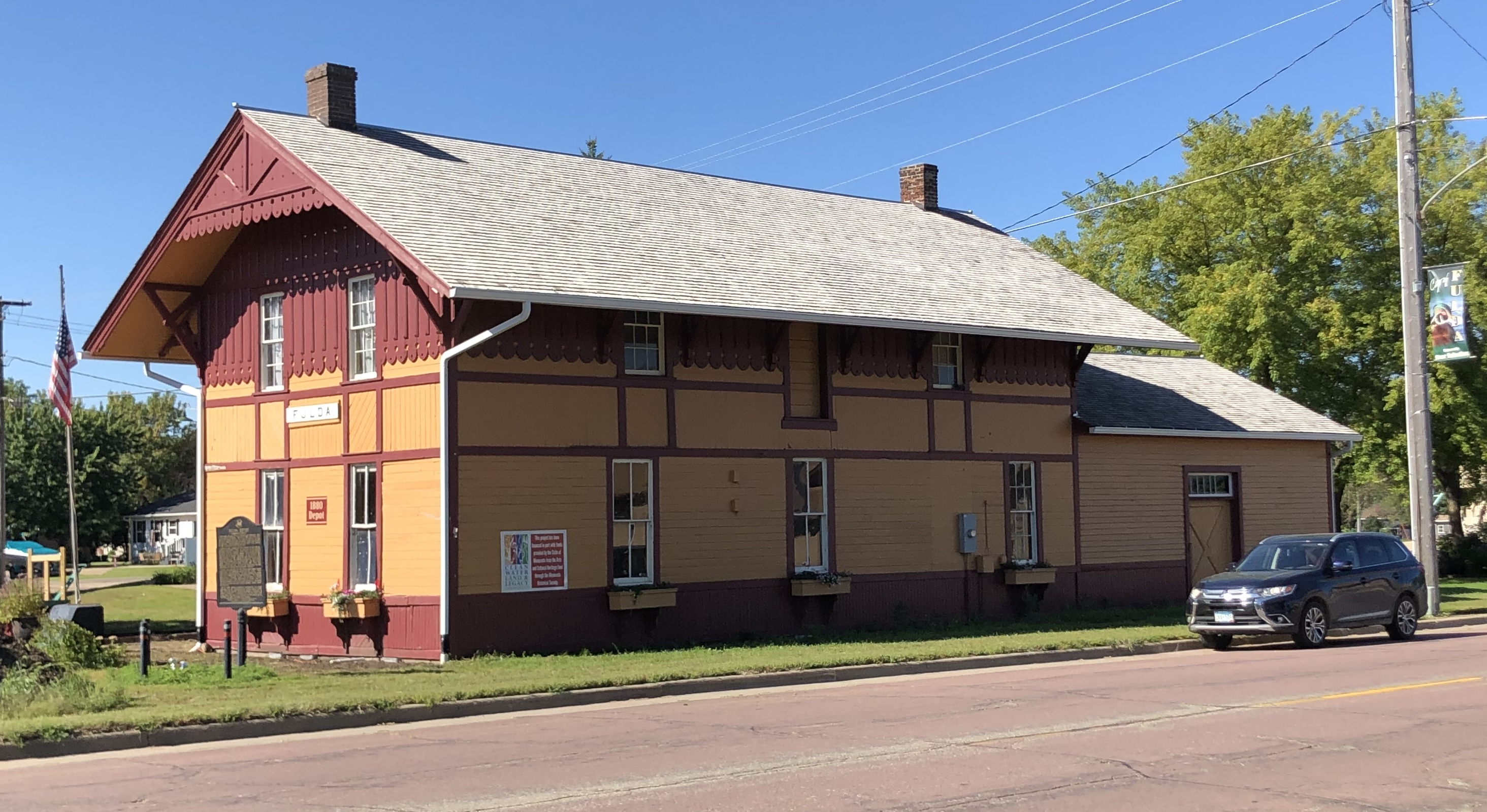
- Established: 1978
- Location: 105 W Front St, Fulda, Minnesota 56131 United States
- Coordinates: 43.869444°N 95.600556°W
- Type: Local history
- Website: fuldamn.com/fulda-heritage-society

- Chicago, Milwaukee, St. Paul and Pacific Depot
- U.S. National Register of Historic Places
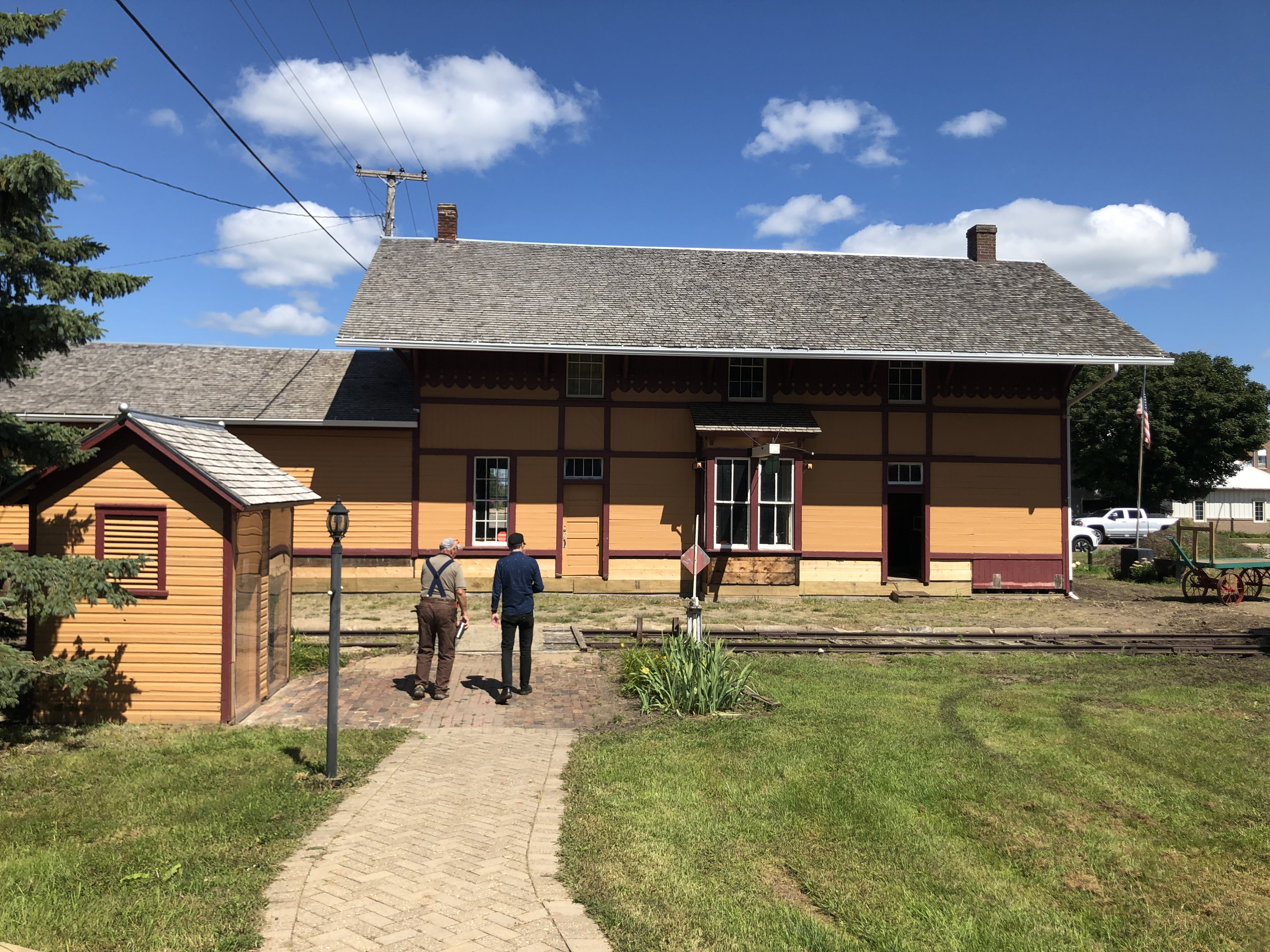
- Track side of building

- Location within Minnesota Location within the United States
- Location: 105 W Front St, Fulda, Minnesota 56131 United States
- Built: 1880
- NRHP reference No.: 79003716
- Designated: October 16, 1979

The Fulda Depot Museum in Fulda, Minnesota is a historic site and museum that preserves the legacy of the town’s railroad era. The museum operates in the former Chicago, Milwaukee, St. Paul, and Pacific Railroad Depot.

== History ==
Rail service reached Fulda in September 1879, helping establish the town as a hub for agricultural shipping and travel. The depot structure was built in 1880 and initially sat between the tracks to enable direct transfer of goods and passengers. It was relocated to its current site in 1904 for improved access.

At the height of its operation, up to eight trains stopped in Fulda each day. Train travel fostered commerce and connections between Fulda and cities such as Minneapolis and Omaha. Passenger service ended in 1963, the depot was closed in 1976 and rail activity ceased altogether to Fulda in 1979. The track was removed the following year. The depot was officially listed on the National Register of Historic Places on October 16, 1979. Following the closure of the depot building, the Fulda Heritage Society was formed and officially incorporated in 1978.

== Significance ==
The Chicago, Milwaukee, St. Paul, and Pacific Depot is the only surviving Eastlake-style two-story railroad depot in southwestern Minnesota, reflecting a type of frame construction and ornamentation unique in the region. Visitors can explore the depot’s original waiting room, ticket office, and baggage area. The museum displays vintage railroad paraphernalia such as train tickets, advertisements, and equipment.

== Restoration ==
In 2025, the Fulda Depot underwent repairs and structural reinforcement funded by a $170,000 grant from the Minnesota Historical and Cultural Heritage Grants program. Work on the building started in early April and included the installation of a new sump pump, which required digging out 4.5 feet of dirt beneath the structure. Other repairs addressed the floor joists, the addition of a wall to support the chimney, and landscaping at the front of the building. These measures aimed to stabilize and preserve the depot’s structure for the future.

== Gallery ==
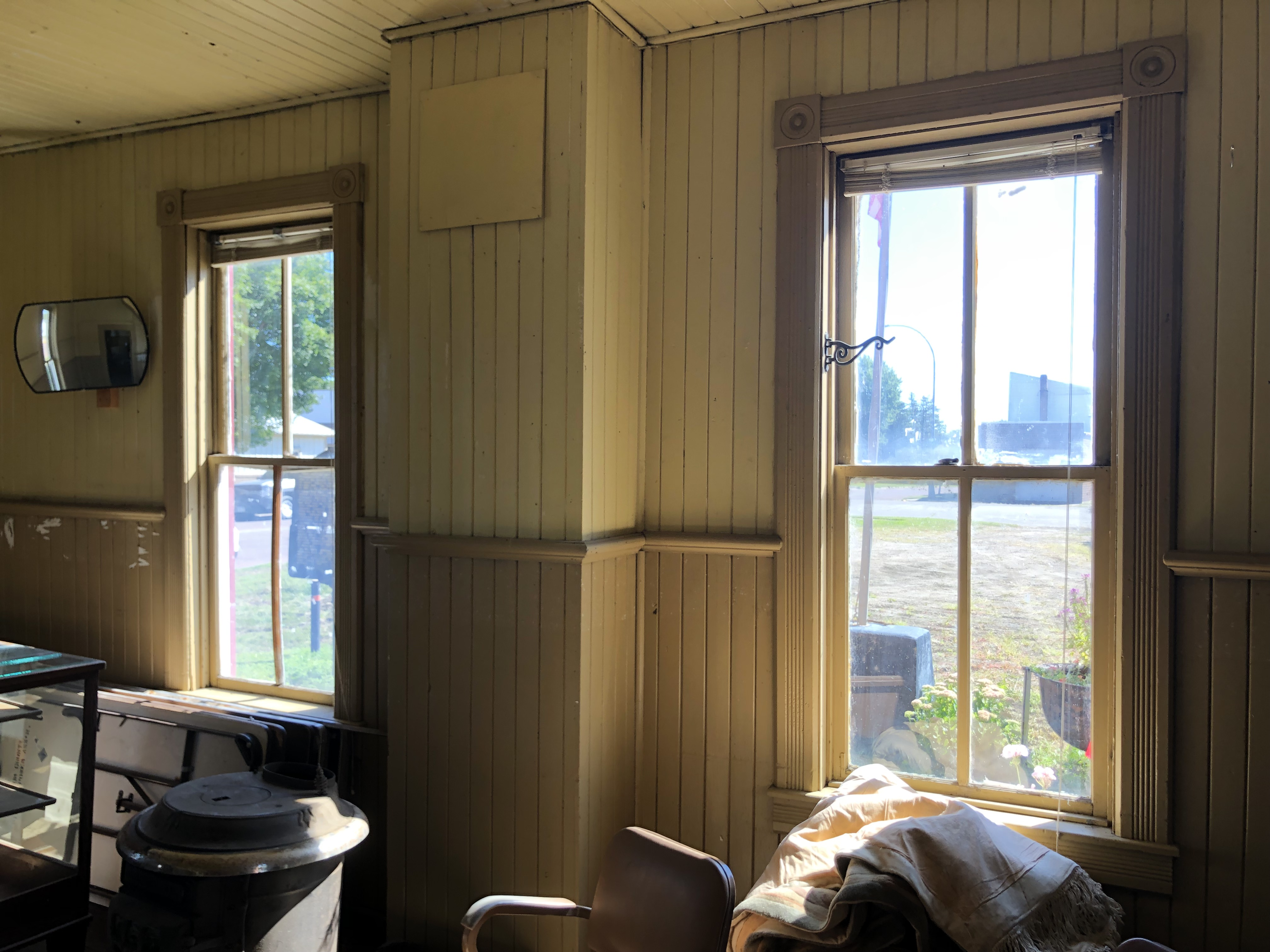
Looking out to rail yard

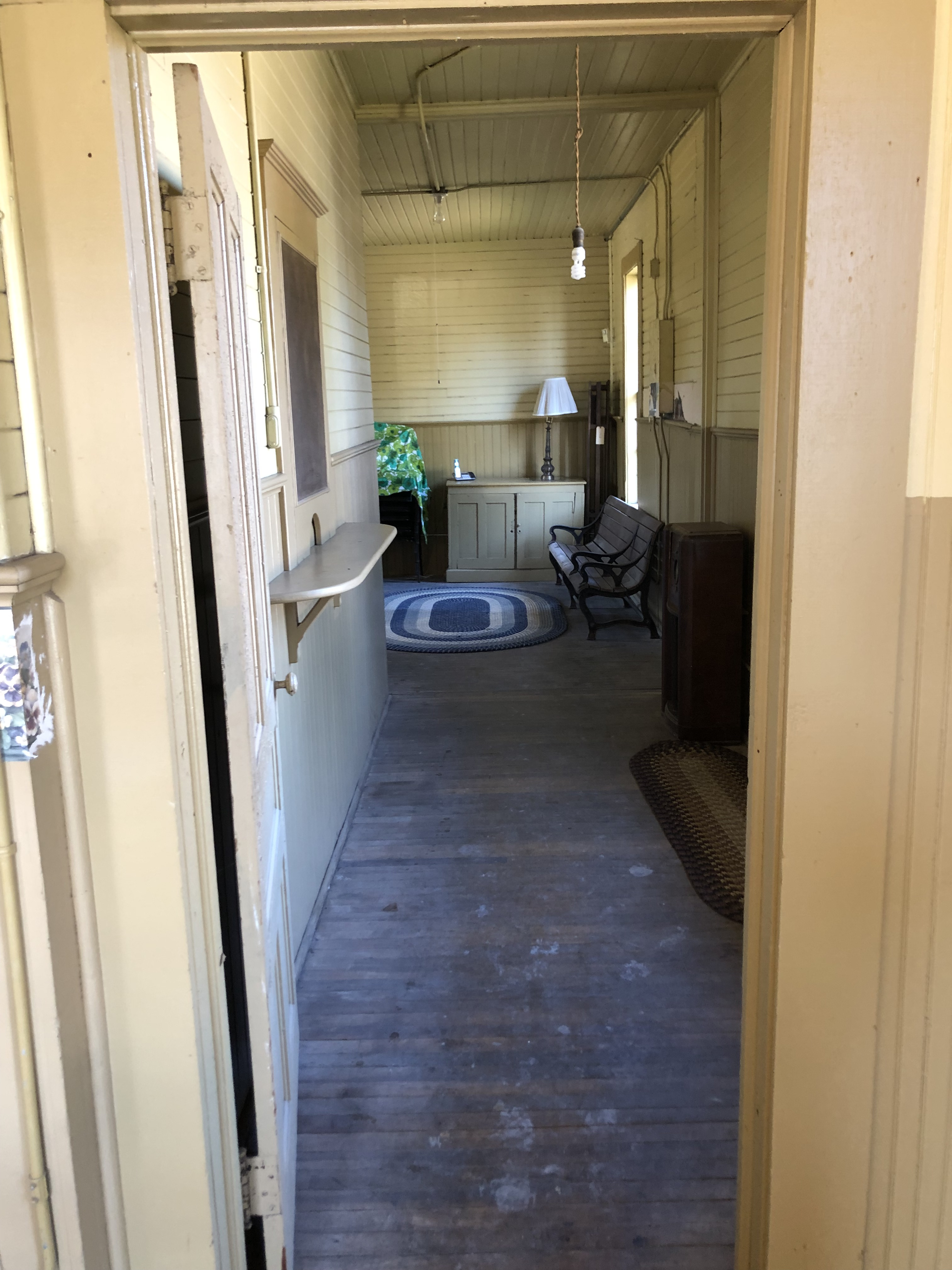
Ticket window

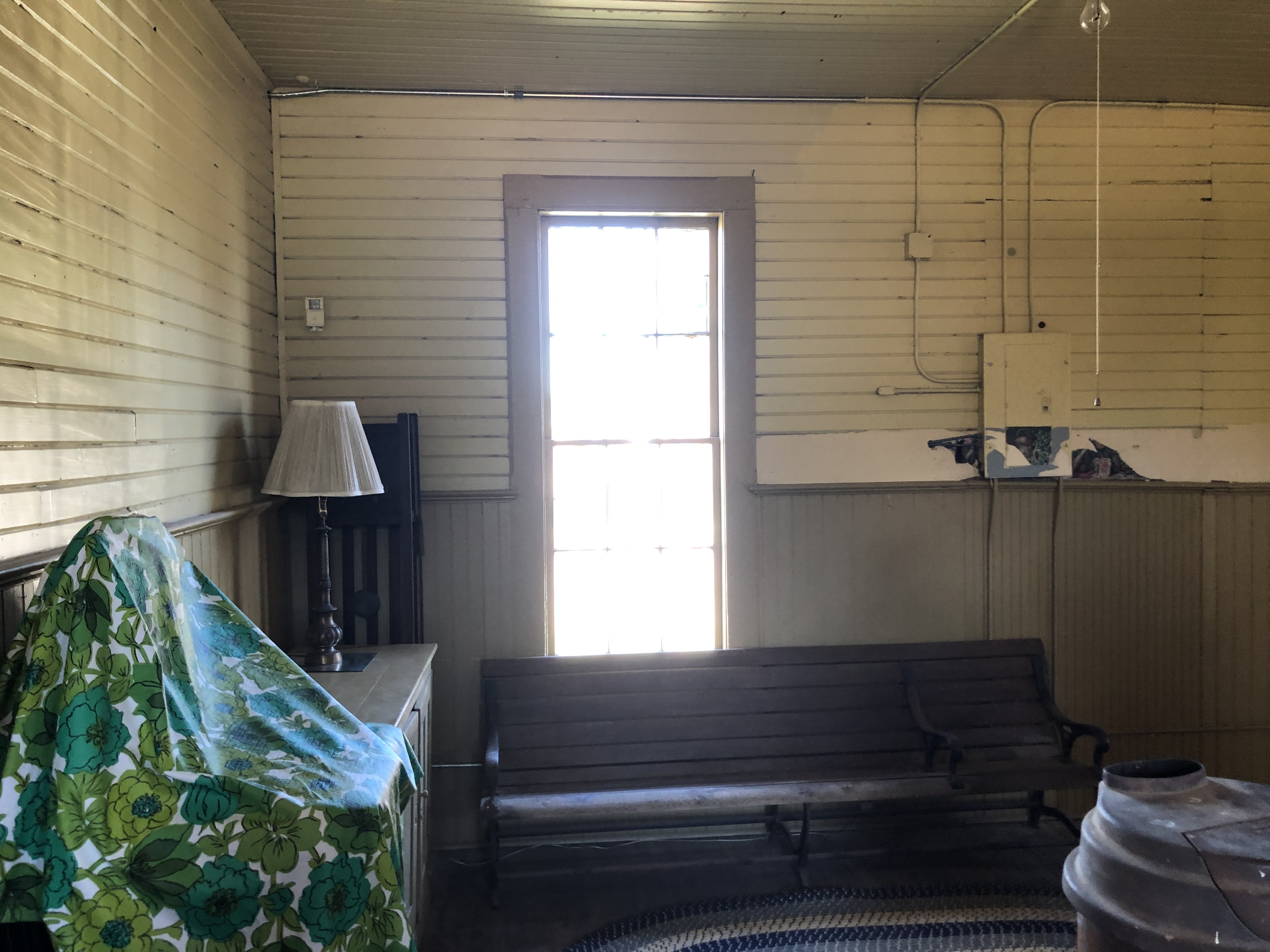
Waiting area

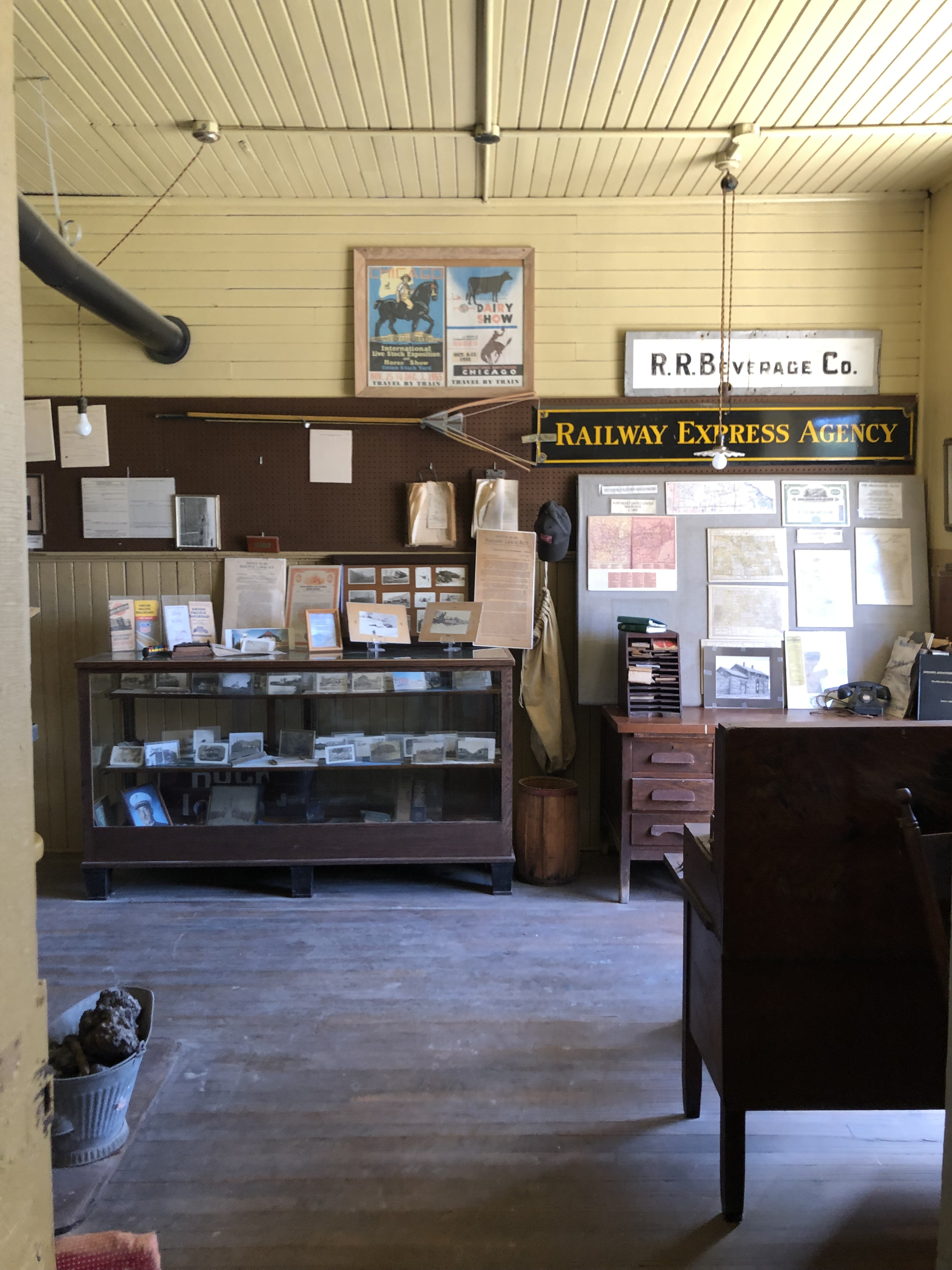
Museum entrance

== See also ==
- List of museums in Minnesota

Preceding station	Milwaukee Road	Following station
Chandler toward Wessington Springs	Wessington Springs – La Crosse	Lakefield toward La Crosse
