= The Continental Co-ets =

American rock and roll band

The Continental Co-ets were an American all-female rock and roll band founded in 1963 in Fulda, Minnesota.

== Background ==
The band was composed of teenage girls enrolled at Fulda High School. Nancy Hofmann played the bass guitar, Carol Goins on lead guitar, Vicki Steinman on drums, and Carolyn Behr on rhythm guitar. Later, the group included Hofmann's sister, MaryJo Hofmann, on keyboards. They gained recognition for being one of the first female bands formed, and to play their own instruments. The band was encouraged by their chorus teacher, David Edwards, to start performing. The group's first public performance was at a movie theater in Marshall, Minnesota. In the beginning, the band only played instrumentals as they did not have a lead vocalist. Another local band, The Vultures, invited the group to a "battle of the sexes". The Continental Co-ets practiced extensively, and included vocals to their performance which led to a successful concert. This, along with other similar performances, opened the band to a broader audience. Their touring extended throughout the Midwest and Canada.

== Recordings ==
In late 1965, the band traveled to Milford, Iowa to record two original compositions, "I Don't Love You No More" and "Medley of Junk", for the IGL (Iowa Great Lakes) label. About 1,000 copies were produced for release and charted in some parts of Canada. They recorded two more songs in March 1966, but were not released until the 1990s.

== Disbandment ==
In 1967, the band disbanded when the members either left for college or got married. In 2002, the band was inducted into the Iowa Hall of Fame. The band reformed to perform at the induction ceremony.

== See also ==
- Music of Minnesota
- Women in music
- Women in rock
