= 1942 Sioux Falls mayoral special election =

- November 17, 1942; November 24, 1942

Candidate	C. M. Whitfield	John N. Browning	Adolph Nelson Graff
Party	Nonpartisan	Nonpartisan	Nonpartisan
First round	3,922; 39.66%	3,806; 38.49%	2,160; 21.84%
Runoff	5,892; 53.25%	5,172; 46.75%	Eliminated
Mayor before election
Joseph S. Nelson (acting)
Nonpartisan
Elected mayor
C. M. Whitfield
Nonpartisan

The 1942 Sioux Falls mayoral special election took place on November 24, 1942, following a primary election on November 17, 1942. Incumbent Mayor John T. McKee died on August 31, 1942, elevating City Commissioner Joseph S. Nelson as acting Mayor until a special election could be held. The special election was held to fill the remaining two years of McKee's term.

In the primary election, City Auditor C. M. Whitfield placed first, winning 40 percent of the vote, and former State Representative John N. Browning placed second, winning 38 percent of the vote. In the general election, Whitfield narrowly defeated Browning, 53–47 percent.

== Primary election ==
=== Candidates ===
- C. M. Field, City Auditor
- John N. Browning, former State Representative, 1939 candidate for Mayor
- Adolph Nelson Graff, former Mayor

=== Results ===
1942 Sioux Falls mayoral special primary election
Party	Candidate	Votes	%
Nonpartisan	C. M. Whitfield	3,922	39.66%
Nonpartisan	John N. Browning	3,806	38.49%
Nonpartisan	Adolph Nelson Graff	2,160	21.84%
Total votes		9,888	100.00%

== General election ==
1942 Sioux Falls mayoral special runoff election
Party	Candidate	Votes	%
Nonpartisan	C. M. Whitfield	5,892	53.25%
Nonpartisan	John N. Browning	5,172	46.75%
Total votes		11,064	100.00%
