= Plum Creek Library System =

The Plum Creek Library System (PCLS) is a federated regional public library system of libraries throughout southwestern Minnesota, United States. PCLS coordinates delivery, interlibrary loan, automation, cataloging, cooperative purchasing and other services to 26 member public libraries in 9 counties. 13 school libraries contract for delivery, automation, and cataloging services through PCLS. Each library is locally controlled. The region was the setting of Laura Ingalls Wilder's book “On the Banks of Plum Creek” from which it takes its name.
