= Avoca, Minnesota =

City in Minnesota, United States

- City
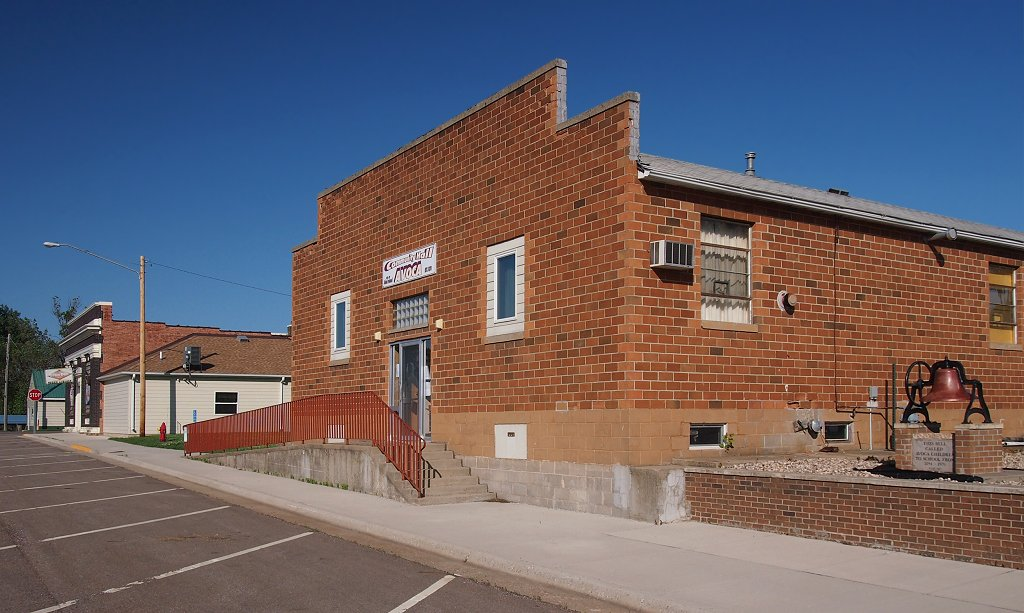
- Avoca's community hall on SW 2nd Street

- Location of Avoca within Murray County, Minnesota
- Coordinates: 43°56′56″N 95°38′47″W
- Country: United States
- State: Minnesota
- County: Murray
- Founded: 1878

Government
  - Type: Mayor – Council
  - Mayor: Barbara Kirchner

Area
  - Total: 1.169 sq mi (3.028 km^{2})
  - Land: 0.964 sq mi (2.497 km^{2})
  - Water: 0.205 sq mi (0.532 km^{2})
- Elevation: 1,539 ft (469 m)

Population (2020)
  - Total: 111
  - Estimate (2022): 110
  - Density: 115.2/sq mi (44.46/km^{2})
- Time zone: UTC−6 (Central (CST))
  - Summer (DST): UTC−5 (CDT)
- ZIP Code: 56114
- Area code: 507
- FIPS code: 27-03052
- GNIS feature ID: 2394041
- Sales tax: 6.875%

Avoca (/ˈævoʊkə/ AV-oh-kə) is a city in Murray County, Minnesota, United States. The population was 111 at the 2020 census.

== Geography ==
According to the United States Census Bureau, the city has a total area of 1.169 square miles (3.03 km^{2}), of which 0.964 square miles (2.50 km^{2}) is land and 0.205 square miles (0.53 km^{2}) is water. It is just south of Lime Lake.

U.S. Highway 59 and Murray County Roads 6 and 38 are the main routes in the community.

== Demographics ==
Historical population
Census	Pop.	Note	%±
1880	135		—
1890	170		25.9%
1900	338		98.8%
1910	212		−37.3%
1920	270		27.4%
1930	285		5.6%
1940	323		13.3%
1950	281		−13.0%
1960	226		−19.6%
1970	203		−10.2%
1980	201		−1.0%
1990	150		−25.4%
2000	146		−2.7%
2010	147		0.7%
2020	111		−24.5%
2022 (est.)	110		−0.9%
U.S. Decennial Census; 2020 Census

=== 2020 census ===
As of the 2020 census, there were 111 people, 54 households, and 39 families residing in the city. The population density was 115.6 inhabitants per square mile (44.6/km^{2}). There were 72 housing units at an average density of 75 per square mile (29.0/km^{2}). The racial makeup of the city was 96.4% White, 1.8% from other races, and 1.8% from two or more races. Hispanic or Latino of any race were 1.8% of the population.

There were 54 households, of which 18.5% had children under the age of 18 living with them, 26.1% were married couples living together, 0% had a female householder with no husband present, 8.7% had a male householder with no wife present, and 27.8% were non-families. 18.5% of all households were made up of individuals, and 9.3% had someone living alone who was 65 years of age or older. The average household size was 2.13 and the average family size was 2.38.

The median age in the city was 50.8 years. 19.1% of residents were under the age of 18; 2.6% were between the ages of 18 and 24; 18.3% were from 25 to 44; 37.4% were from 45 to 64; and 22.6% were 65 years of age or older. The gender makeup of the city was 53.0% male and 47.0% female.

=== 2010 census ===
As of the 2010 census, there were 147 people, 61 households, and 36 families residing in the city. The population density was 151.5 inhabitants per square mile (58.5/km^{2}). There were 77 housing units at an average density of 79.4 per square mile (30.7/km^{2}). The racial makeup of the city was 93.2% White, 2.0% from other races, and 4.8% from two or more races. Hispanic or Latino of any race were 5.4% of the population.

There were 61 households, of which 31.1% had children under the age of 18 living with them, 50.8% were married couples living together, 3.3% had a female householder with no husband present, 4.9% had a male householder with no wife present, and 41.0% were non-families. 37.7% of all households were made up of individuals, and 11.5% had someone living alone who was 65 years of age or older. The average household size was 2.41 and the average family size was 3.22.

The median age in the city was 44.1 years. 26.5% of residents were under the age of 18; 8.3% were between the ages of 18 and 24; 17.7% were from 25 to 44; 36% were from 45 to 64; and 11.6% were 65 years of age or older. The gender makeup of the city was 51.0% male and 49.0% female.

=== 2000 census ===
As of the 2000 census, there were 146 people, 67 households, and 38 families residing in the city. The population density was 134.3 inhabitants per square mile (51.9/km^{2}). There were 73 housing units at an average density of 67.2 per square mile (25.9/km^{2}). The racial makeup of the city was 100.00% White.

There were 67 households, out of which 23.9% had children under the age of 18 living with them, 47.8% were married couples living together, 7.5% had a female householder with no husband present, and 41.8% were non-families. 37.3% of all households were made up of individuals, and 13.4% had someone living alone who was 65 years of age or older. The average household size was 2.18 and the average family size was 2.82.

In the city, the population was spread out, with 21.9% under the age of 18, 2.7% from 18 to 24, 27.4% from 25 to 44, 32.9% from 45 to 64, and 15.1% who were 65 years of age or older. The median age was 44 years. For every 100 females, there were 117.9 males. For every 100 females age 18 and over, there were 119.2 males.

The median income for a household in the city was $29,375, and the median income for a family was $33,750. Males had a median income of $25,313 versus $16,667 for females. The per capita income for the city was $13,184. There were 7.5% of families and 12.6% of the population living below the poverty line, including 11.8% of under eighteens and 12.5% of those over 64.

== History ==
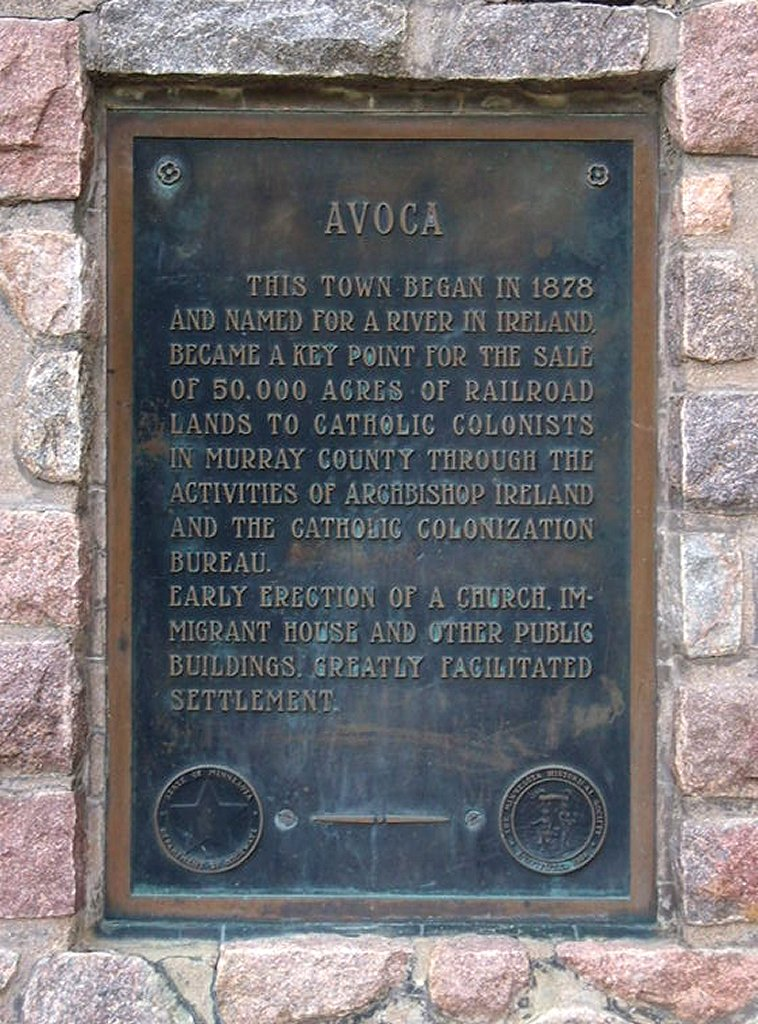
Historical marker in Avoca

In 1879, Avoca was named for the village of Avoca in County Wicklow, Ireland.

A Catholic school for Native American girls ran circa 1882-1896 and later reopened in 1905 as a boys military school until it was destroyed by fire on February 12, 1910. The town's water supply was frozen, which meant that the building was unable to be saved.

St. Rose of Lima Catholic Church suffered a fire in 1889 but was rebuilt though it is now closed and the structure torn down. Three former Lutheran churches long ago merged into Faith Evangelical Lutheran Church (ELCA), which closed in August, 2018. The nondenominational Word of Faith Fellowship, established 1983, is the only church currently in town.

A public school was built in 1894, but is no longer in use.

Avoca suffered two devastating fires, first in 1907 then again in 1952.

== Politics ==
Avoca is located in Minnesota's 2nd congressional district, represented by Regal attorney Michelle Fischbach, a Republican. At the state level, Avoca is located in Senate District 21, represented by Republican Mike Goggin, and in House District 21A, represented by Republican Barb Haley.
