= John N. Browning =

American politician

Member of the South Dakota House of Representatives
- In office 1927–1928

Personal details
- Born: December 11, 1899 Fulda, Minnesota, U.S.
- Died: November 17, 1981 (aged 81) Minnehaha County, South Dakota, U.S.
- Party: Republican
- Spouse: Vera Packman
- Children: 2

John N. Browning (December 11, 1899 – November 17, 1981) was an American politician. He served as a Republican member of the South Dakota House of Representatives.

== Life and career ==
Browning was born in Fulda, Minnesota. He fought in World War I. He was a city commissioner for the Sioux Falls City Commission.

In 1927, Browning was elected to the South Dakota House of Representatives, representing Minnehaha County, South Dakota, serving until 1928.

Browning died in November 1981 in Minnehaha County, South Dakota, at the age of 81.
