= Kinbrae, Minnesota =

City in Minnesota, United States

- City
- Location of Kinbrae, Minnesota
- Coordinates: 43°49′36″N 95°28′56″W
- Country: United States
- State: Minnesota
- County: Nobles
- Founded: 1879
- Incorporated: February 17, 1896

Government
  - Type: Mayor - Council
  - Mayor: Glen Grunewald

Area
  - Total: 1.004 sq mi (2.600 km^{2})
  - Land: 0.867 sq mi (2.246 km^{2})
  - Water: 0.137 sq mi (0.356 km^{2})
- Elevation: 1,447 ft (441 m)

Population (2020)
  - Total: 10
  - Estimate (2023): 14
  - Density: 11.5/sq mi (4.45/km^{2})
- Time zone: UTC−6 (Central (CST))
  - Summer (DST): UTC−5 (CDT)
- ZIP Code: 56131
- Area code: 507
- FIPS code: 27-33236
- GNIS feature ID: 2395534
- Sales tax: 7.375%

Kinbrae (/ˈkɪnbreɪ/ KIN-bray) is a city in Nobles County, Minnesota, United States. The population was 10 at the 2020 census, making the city the least populous incorporated place in Minnesota.

== Geography ==
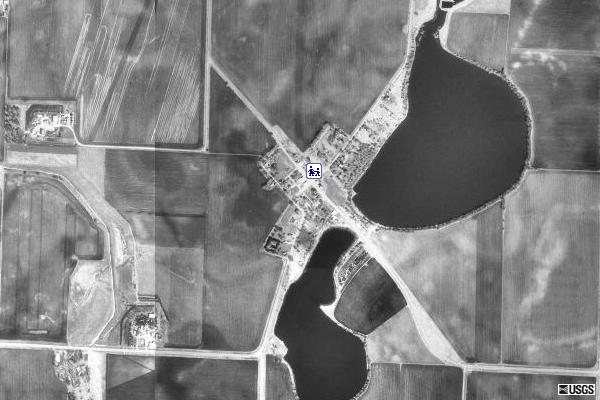
Satellite Photo of Kinbrae, Minnesota

According to the United States Census Bureau, the city has a total area of 1.01 square miles (2.62 km^{2}), of which 0.87 square miles (2.25 km^{2}) is land and 0.14 square miles (0.36 km^{2}) is water. The town is located in the far northeastern corner of Nobles County. Kinbrae lies one mile west of Jackson County, and one mile south of Murray County.

Main highway:

- Nobles County Road 1

== History ==
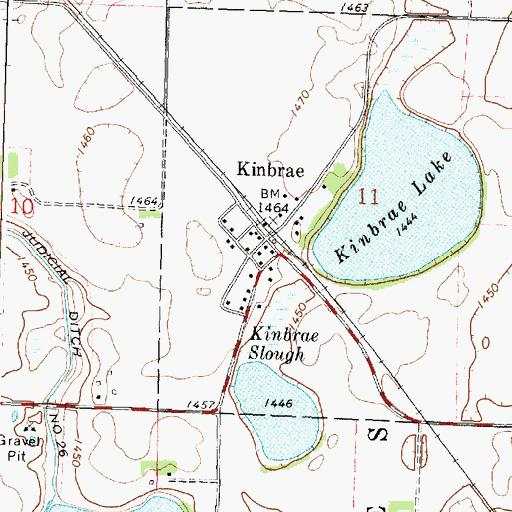
Topographic Map of Kinbrae, Minnesota

Main Street of Kinbrae, Minnesota, showing rail depot

View of Dumont Street, Kinbrae, Minnesota

Old Grain Elevator in Kinbrae, Minnesota

Site selections: In the year 1879, the Southern Minnesota Railroad began building a route from Heron Lake, to Fulda. A rail station was proposed for the Graham Lakes region, and the site selected was briefly named Airlie in honor of David Ogilvy, the 10th Earl of Airlie. The Earl was president of the Dundee Improvement company, a Scottish company formed for the purpose of founding a town in southwest Minnesota. In September and October 1879, Oglivy's company built a steam elevator with a capacity of 16,000 bushels, a hotel, and a general store building in Airlie. The Dundee Improvement company played no role in founding the nearby town of Dundee. In fact, the towns of Kinbrae (Airlie) and Dundee, though separated by a mere 1/2 mile, were rivals, built along the roads of competing rail lines.

Change of name: When the site was surveyed in December 1879, Airlie was formally rechristened DeForest. A depot and a post office were both constructed in 1880 even though the census showed a mere 19 residents. The depot was known as DeForest Station, but the post office was known as Airlie until January 1882 when the name was formally changed to DeForest. The steam elevator was wiped out by fire on April 20, 1883, and this spelled the end of the Dundee Improvement Company's involvement. As a historical footnote, David Ogilvy's granddaughter Clementine Hozier was married to Winston Churchill from 1908 until his death in 1965.

Kinbrae: In August 1883, DeForest Station, the townsite, and the post office were renamed Kinbrae. Little is known about the name Kinbrae, other than that it is Scottish. Ownership of Kinbrae passed into the hands of Hanson & Graeger, a Chicago land-colonization firm, but the company showed little interest in development of the new town. The townsite was then sold to W. N. Bickley and W. E. Fletcher in 1895, who made great efforts "to boom the town," or to attract businesses and residents. By 1896, Kinbrae boasted two general stores, a hardware store, a lumber yard, two elevators, a blacksmith shop, a hotel, a bank, a creamery, two churches (Methodist and Presbyterian), and a school.

Incorporation: The town was incorporated on February 17, 1896, and the first village president was a Mr. L. F. Miller. The census of 1900 gave Kinbrae a population of 137. Kinbrae's post office was discontinued in the year 1971, and by the year 2000, the town had a mere 21 residents. Population estimates from 2007 put the number of residents at 17. Kinbrae citizens briefly considered disincorporation in the year 2010, but elected to remain a municipality however small.

== Demographics ==
Historical population
Census	Pop.	Note	%±
1880	19		—
1900	137		—
1910	137		0.0%
1920	121		−11.7%
1930	115		−5.0%
1940	107		−7.0%
1950	85		−20.6%
1960	55		−35.3%
1970	37		−32.7%
1980	40		8.1%
1990	18		−55.0%
2000	21		16.7%
2010	12		−42.9%
2020	10		−16.7%
2023 (est.)	14		40.0%
U.S. Decennial Census; 2020 Census

=== 2010 census ===
As of the 2010 census, there were 12 people, 6 households, and 3 families residing in the city. The population density was 13.8 inhabitants per square mile (5.3/km^{2}). There were 11 housing units at an average density of 12.6 per square mile (4.9/km^{2}). The racial makeup of the city was 100.0% White.

There were 6 households, of which 50.0% were married couples living together and 50.0% were non-families. 0.0% of all households were made up of individuals. The average household size was 2.00 and the average family size was 2.00.

The median age in the city was 55 years. 0.0% of residents were under the age of 18; 16.7% were between the ages of 18 and 24; 0.0% were from 25 to 44; 66.8% were from 45 to 64; and 16.7% were 65 years of age or older. The gender makeup of the city was 50.0% male and 50.0% female.

=== 2000 census ===
As of the 2000 census, there were 21 people, 10 households, and 6 families residing in the city. The population density was 25.4 inhabitants per square mile (9.8/km^{2}). There were 14 housing units at an average density of 16.9 per square mile (6.5/km^{2}). The racial makeup of the city was 100.00% White.

There were 10 households, out of which 30.0% had children under the age of 18 living with them, 50.0% were married couples living together, and 40.0% were non-families. 40.0% of all households were made up of individuals, and none had someone living alone who was 65 years of age or older. The average household size was 2.10 and the average family size was 2.83.

In the city, the population was spread out, with 23.8% under the age of 18, 4.8% from 18 to 24, 38.1% from 25 to 44, 28.6% from 45 to 64, and 4.8% who were 65 years of age or older. The median age was 42 years. For every 100 females, there were 250.0 males. For every 100 females age 18 and over, there were 220.0 males.

The median income for a household in the city was $31,250, and the median income for a family was $46,250. Males had a median income of $23,750 versus $50,625 for females. The per capita income for the city was $17,839. None of the population or the families were below the poverty line.

== Politics ==
Kinbrae is located in Minnesota's 1st congressional district, represented by Brad Finstad, a Republican. At the state level, Kinbrae is located in Senate District 22, represented by Republican Bill Weber, and in House District 22A, represented by Republican Joe Schomacker.

=== Local politics ===
The mayor of Kinbrae is Glen Grunewald. City council members are Tom Grunewald, Dwight Meintsma, and Hollis Chepa. Kinbrae is located in Graham Lakes Township and is represented by Nobles County Commissioner Marvin Zylstra.
