= Dundee, Minnesota =

City in Minnesota, United States

Dundee
- City
- Location of Dundee, Minnesota
- Coordinates: 43°50′38″N 95°28′00″W
- Country: United States
- State: Minnesota
- County: Nobles

Government
  - Type: Mayor - Council
  - Mayor: Wayne Paplow

Area
  - Total: 0.31 sq mi (0.79 km^{2})
  - Land: 0.31 sq mi (0.79 km^{2})
  - Water: 0 sq mi (0.00 km^{2})
- Elevation: 1,447 ft (441 m)

Population (2020)
  - Total: 73
  - Density: 237.9/sq mi (91.87/km^{2})
- Time zone: UTC-6 (Central (CST))
  - Summer (DST): UTC-5 (CDT)
- FIPS code: 27-17144
- GNIS feature ID: 2394573

Dundee is a city in Nobles County, Minnesota, United States. The population was 73 at the 2020 census.

== Geography ==
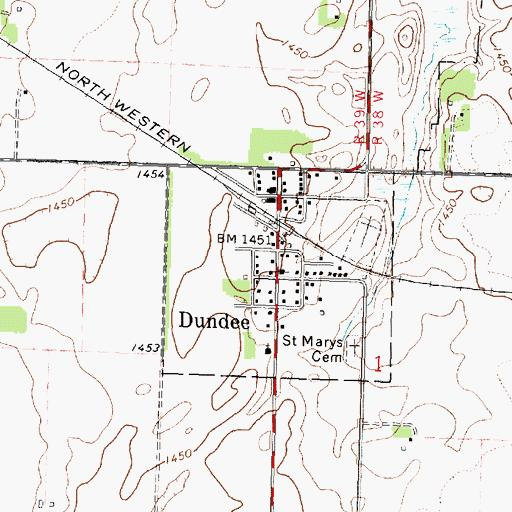
Topographic Map of Dundee, Minnesota

According to the United States Census Bureau, the city has a total area of 0.31 square miles (0.80 km^{2}), all land. Dundee is located in the extreme northeastern corner of Nobles County. The Murray County line defines Dundee's northern border, and the Jackson County line defines its eastern border.

Main highways Include:

- Minnesota State Highway 62 (west)
- Nobles County Road 1

== History ==
Swedish Lutheran Church - Dundee, Minnesota

Main Street, Dundee, Minnesota 1905

Girls Basketball Team, Dundee, Minnesota - early 1900s

Dundee was established in 1879 when the St. Paul and Sioux City Railway Company built a branch line, then known as the Heron Lake & Black Hills Railroad. The first station out of Heron Lake was proposed in the extreme northeastern corner of Nobles County, and was originally named Warren, in honor of Joseph Warren who fell at the Battle of Bunker Hill. The town was surveyed and platted in July 1879, and construction of a depot began on August 13. Mr. G. Foils moved to town and assumed duties of stationmaster on September 1. He was also named postmaster when a post office was established on November 1, 1879. It was at this time that the name was changed to Dundee, after the city of Dundee, Scotland. The reason for the name change is lost to history, although it is known that stationmaster/postmaster G. Foils (whose first name is also lost to history) made the change. A Scottish Company known as the Dundee Improvement Company was then financing construction of an elevator, general store, and hotel in nearby Kinbrae, and perhaps Mr. Foils thought he could attract investment in Dundee. The first business was opened in the spring of 1880 by F. D. Lindquist and H. A. Scherlie. Several homes were also built in that second year, but real growth for Dundee did not occur until the late-nineties when the country began to recover from the Panic of 1893. A census taken on December 23, 1897, gave the village a population of 187. At this time, citizens petitioned for incorporation, and on January 4, 1898, the county commissioners granted their request. A special election was held on February 15, and on March 11, 1898, the Dundee council met for the first time. F. D. Lindquist was named village president.

== Demographics ==
Historical population
Census	Pop.	Note	%±
1900	217		—
1910	175		−19.4%
1920	215		22.9%
1930	192		−10.7%
1940	222		15.6%
1950	179		−19.4%
1960	148		−17.3%
1970	138		−6.8%
1980	129		−6.5%
1990	107		−17.1%
2000	102		−4.7%
2010	68		−33.3%
2020	73		7.4%
U.S. Decennial Census

=== 2010 census ===
As of the census of 2010, there were 68 people, 40 households, and 17 families living in the city. The population density was 219.4 inhabitants per square mile (84.7/km^{2}). There were 53 housing units at an average density of 171.0 per square mile (66.0/km^{2}). The racial makeup of the city was 100.0% White.

There were 40 households, of which 12.5% had children under the age of 18 living with them, 42.5% were married couples living together, and 57.5% were non-families. 52.5% of all households were made up of individuals, and 22.5% had someone living alone who was 65 years of age or older. The average household size was 1.70 and the average family size was 2.53.

The median age in the city was 50.7 years. 13.2% of residents were under the age of 18; 4.5% were between the ages of 18 and 24; 14.7% were from 25 to 44; 38.2% were from 45 to 64; and 29.4% were 65 years of age or older. The gender makeup of the city was 57.4% male and 42.6% female.

=== 2000 census ===
As of the census of 2000, there were 102 people, 51 households, and 26 families living in the city. The population density was 346.9 inhabitants per square mile (133.9/km^{2}). There were 55 housing units at an average density of 187.1 per square mile (72.2/km^{2}). The racial makeup of the city was 100.00% White.

There were 51 households, out of which 17.6% had children under the age of 18 living with them, 47.1% were married couples living together, 3.9% had a female householder with no husband present, and 47.1% were non-families. 47.1% of all households were made up of individuals, and 27.5% had someone living alone who was 65 years of age or older. The average household size was 2.00 and the average family size was 2.85.

In the city, the population was spread out, with 20.6% under the age of 18, 9.8% from 18 to 24, 21.6% from 25 to 44, 25.5% from 45 to 64, and 22.5% who were 65 years of age or older. The median age was 43 years. For every 100 females, there were 108.2 males. For every 100 females age 18 and over, there were 113.2 males.

The median income for a household in the city was $21,979, and the median income for a family was $32,000. Males had a median income of $23,611 versus $21,250 for females. The per capita income for the city was $12,171. There were 23.5% of families and 21.2% of the population living below the poverty line, including 25.0% of under eighteens and 55.2% of those over 64.

== Politics ==
Dundee is located in Minnesota's 1st congressional district, represented by Jim Hagedorn, a Republican. At the state level, Dundee is located in Senate District 22, represented by Republican Bill Weber, and in House District 22A, represented by Republican Joe Schomacker.

== Local politics ==
The mayor of Dundee is Wayne Paplow. City council members are J. Norman Clausen, Tony VandenBosch and Tim Wrenn. Dundee is located in Graham Lakes Township which is represented by Nobles County Commissioner Marvin Zylstra.
