= Omaha tornado =

Omaha tornado may refer to:

- The Omaha tornado of 1975, which killed three residents and caused more than $1 billion in damage on May 6, 1975
- The Omaha Easter Sunday tornado (1913), which killed 140 people on March 23, 1913
