= Tornadoes of 1975 =

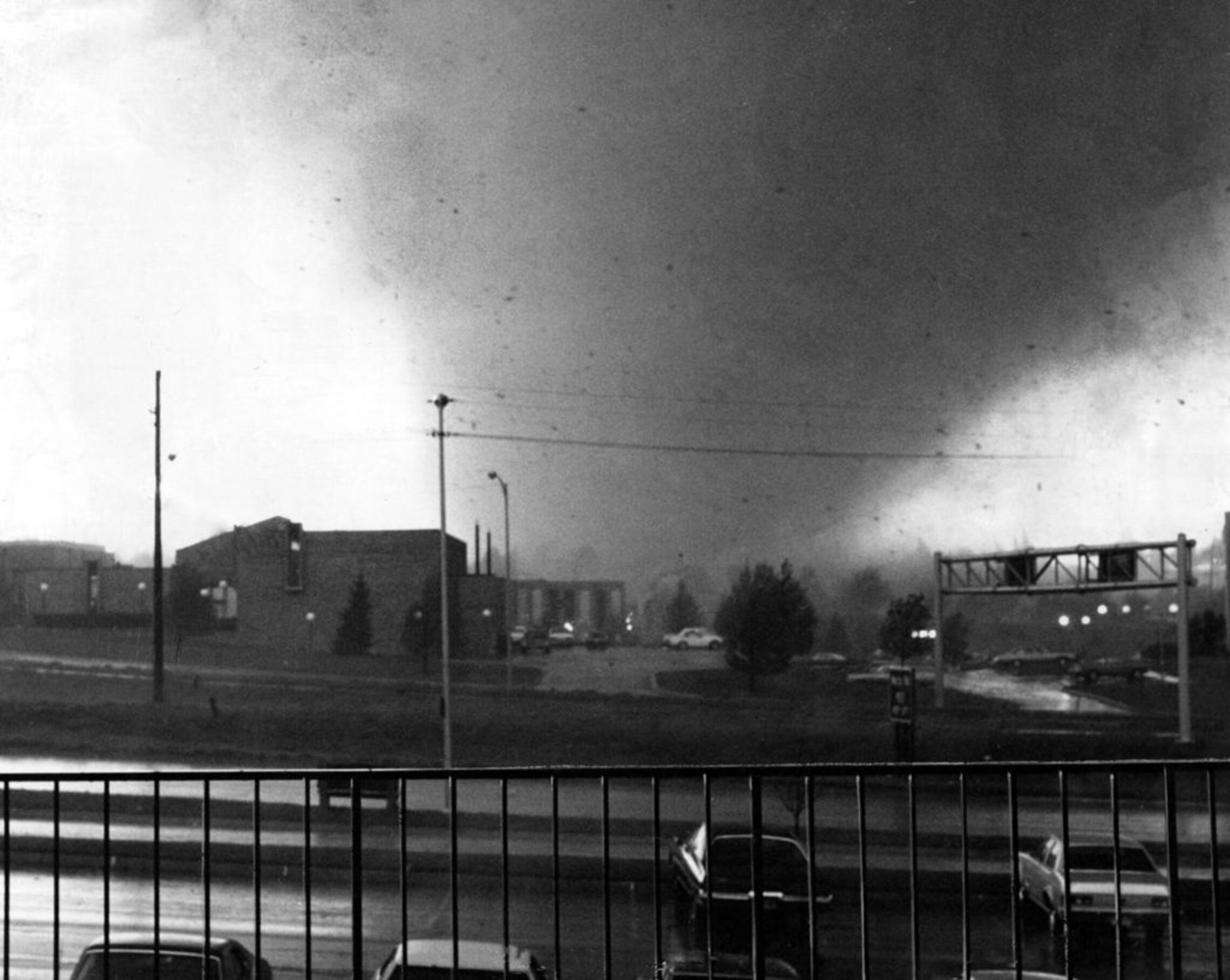
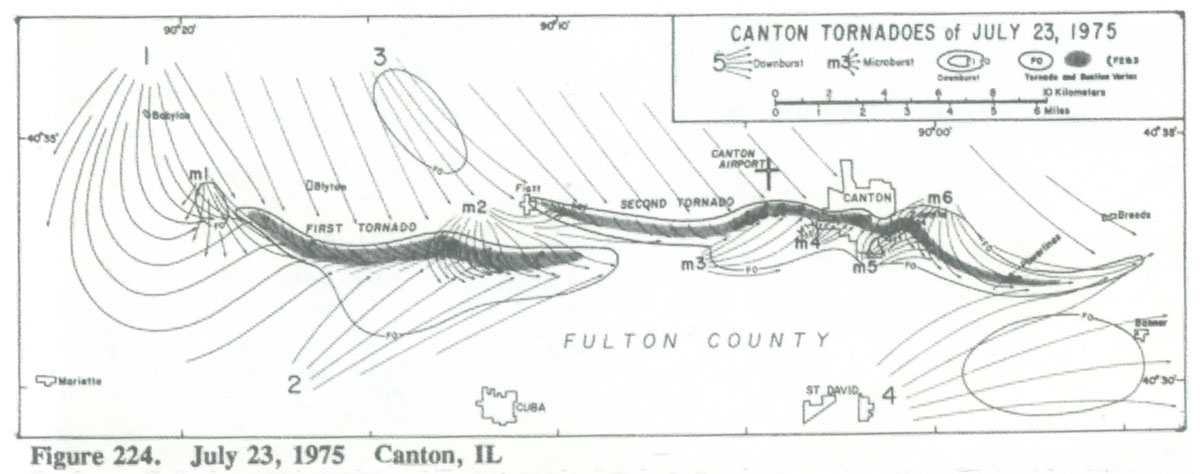
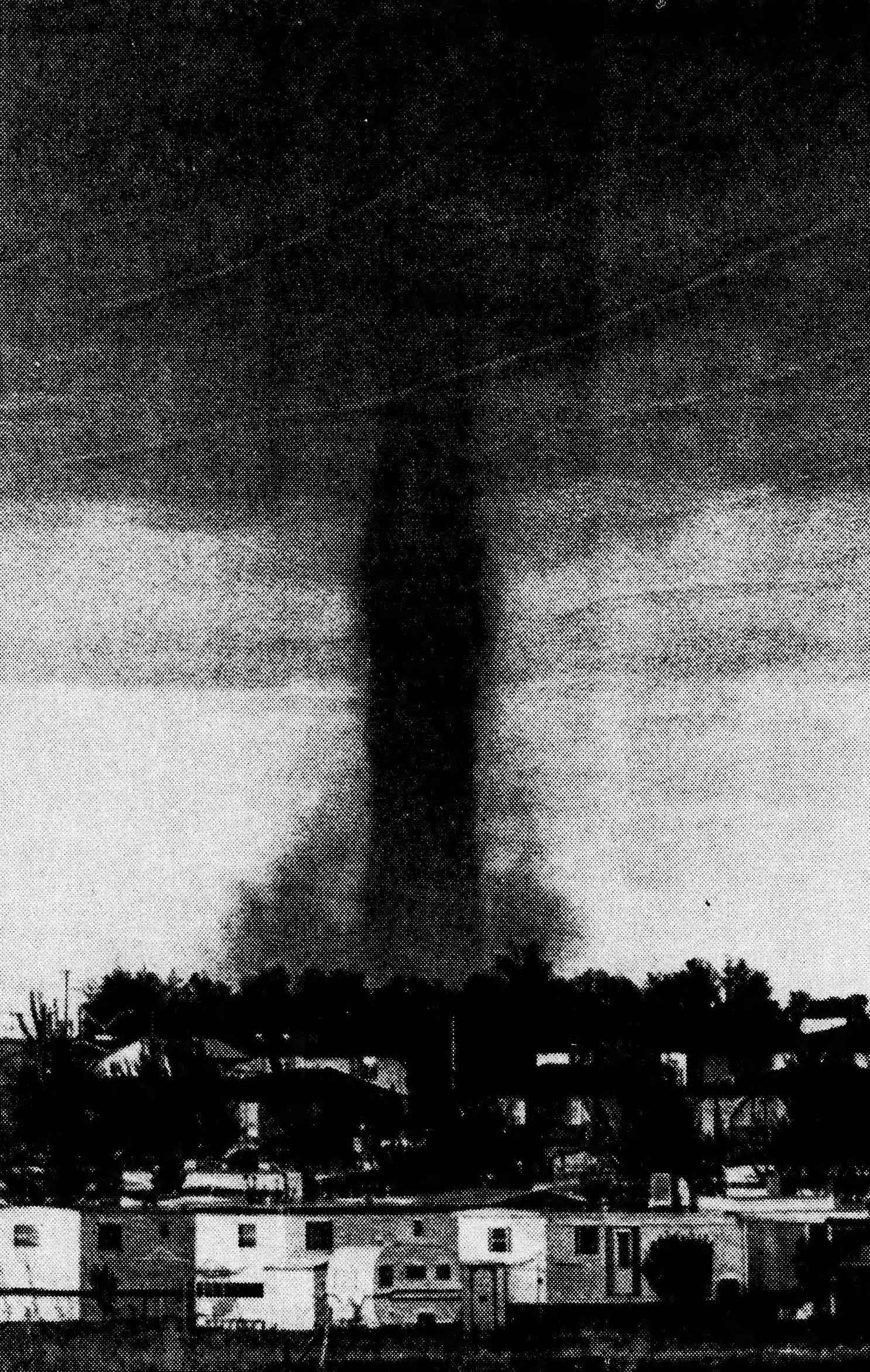
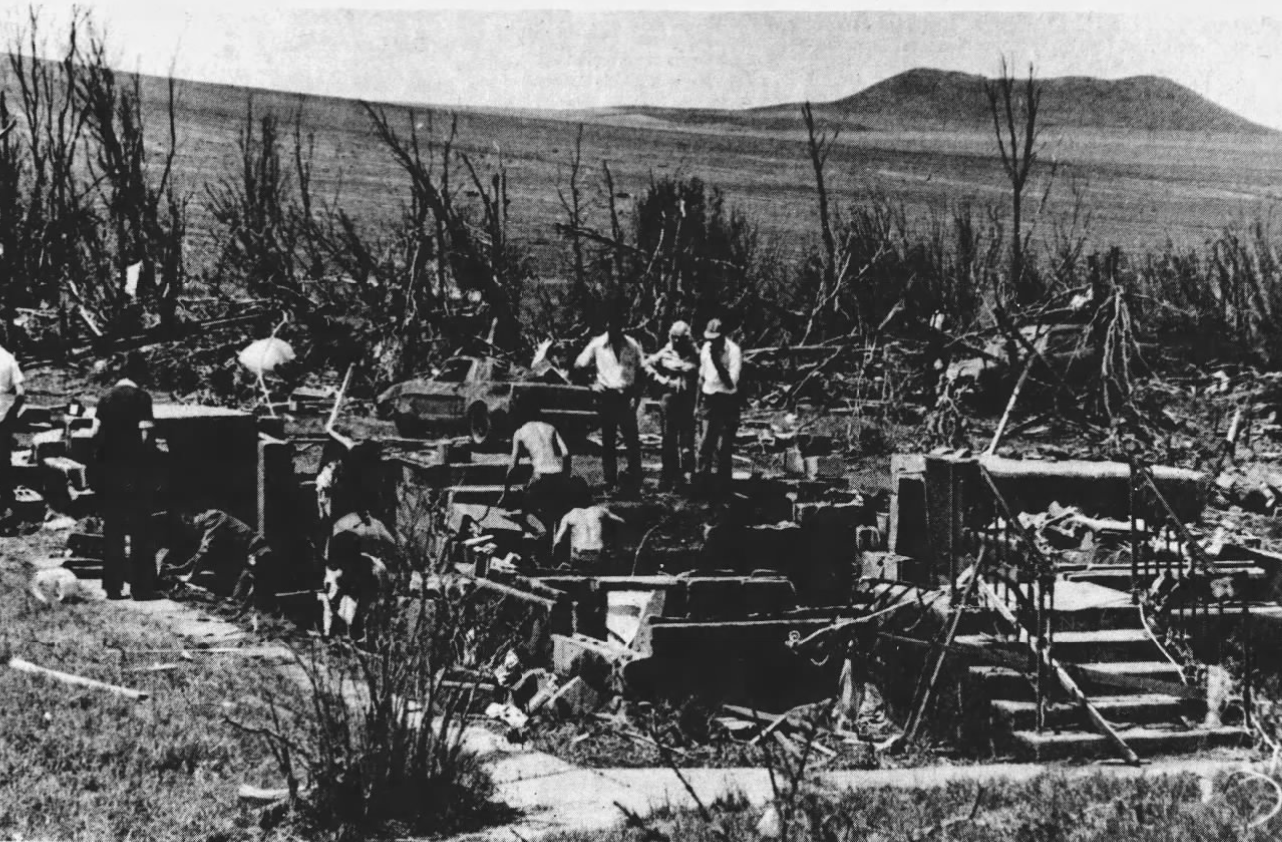
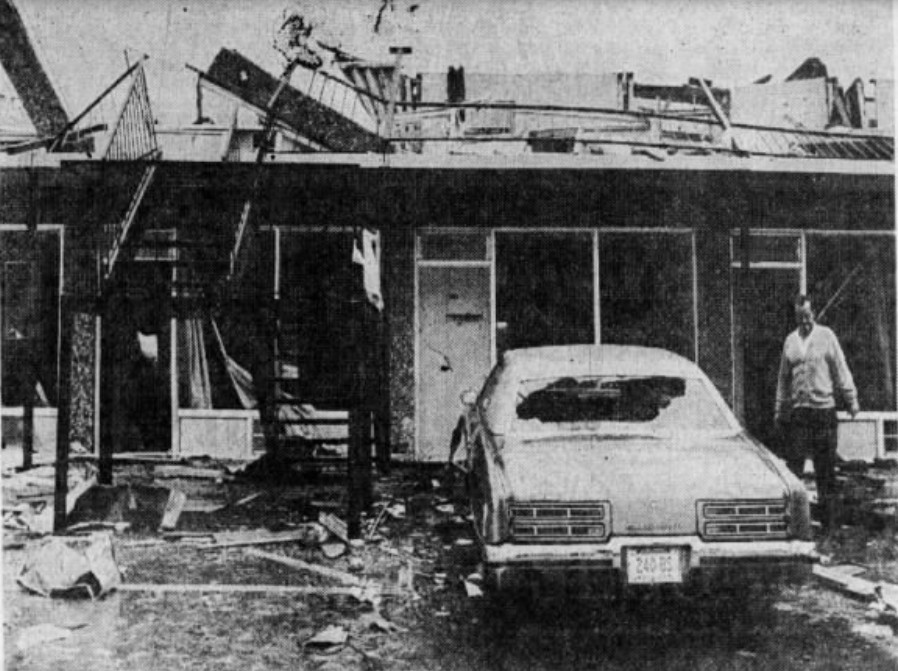
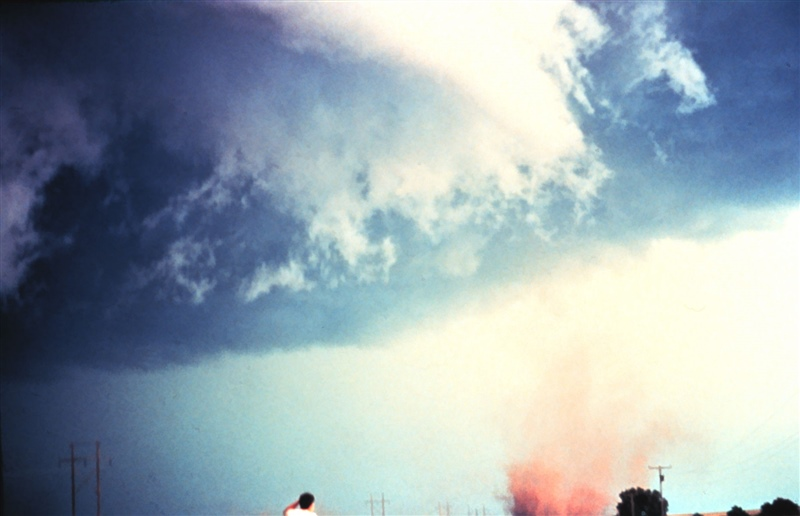
- Clockwise from top: A large F4 tornado as it was tracking through Omaha, Nebraska on May 6; A dust F3 tornado near Denver, Colorado on May 18; A motel in Tuscaloosa, Alabama after an F4 tornado on February 23; An un-condensed tornado near Alva, Oklahoma on June 6; A farmstead that was wiped out by an F4 tornado near Regent, North Dakota on June 29; Ted Fujita's map of two tornadoes near Canton, Illinois on July 23.
- Timespan: January 7 - December 31, 1975
Maximum rated tornado
F4 tornado
- List
  – McComb, Mississippi
  on January 10
  – Tuscaloosa, Alabama
  on February 23
  – Warren, Arkansas
  on March 28
  – Breckenridge, Missouri
  on April 23
  – Macon, Missouri
  on April 23
  – Neosho, Missouri
  on April 24
  – Pierce, Nebraska
  on May 6
  – Omaha, Nebraska
  on May 6
  – Arnold, Nebraska
  on June 18
  – Moorhead, Minnesota
  on June 28
  – Regent-Mott, North Dakota
  on June 29
- Tornadoes in U.S.: 919
- Damage (U.S.): Unknown
- Fatalities (U.S.): 60
- Fatalities (worldwide): >60

This page documents the tornadoes and tornado outbreaks of 1975, primarily in the United States. Most tornadoes form in the U.S., although some events may take place internationally. Tornado statistics for older years like this often appear significantly lower than modern years due to fewer reports or confirmed tornadoes.

== Synopsis ==
Fatal United States tornadoes in 1975
- Approximate touchdown location of killer tornadoes in 1975
Summary of tornadoes
- January 10 – Louisiana (1 death)
- January 10 – Mississippi (9 deaths)
- January 10 – Alabama (1 death)
- January 12 – Florida, Georgia (1 death)
- February 18 – Georgia (2 deaths)
- February 22 – Oklahoma (2 deaths)
- February 22 – Oklahoma (1 death)
- February 22 – Arkansas (1 death)
- February 23 – Alabama (1 death)
- March 24 – Georgia (3 deaths)
- March 26 – Texas (2 deaths)
- March 28 – Arkansas (7 deaths)
- April 18 – Tennessee (1 death)
- April 23 – Missouri (1 death)
- April 23 – Missouri (1 death)
- April 24 – Tennessee (1 death)
- April 24 – Missouri (3 deaths)
- April 25 – Tennessee (1 death)
- April 29 – Texas (3 deaths)
- April 29 – Louisiana (2 deaths)
- May 6 – Nebraska (3 deaths)
- May 13 – Texas (2 deaths)
- June 17 – Michigan (1 death)
- June 18 – Nebraska (1 death)
- June 22 – Texas (3 deaths)
- June 29 – North Dakota (1 death)
- July 23 – Illinois (2 deaths)
- August 31 – Minnesota (2 deaths)
- December 31 – Florida (1 death)
Total fatalities: 60

Numbers for 1975 were very similar to 1974, in terms of number of tornadoes, but not the number of fatalities; however, there were over 1,100 injuries related to tornadoes.

== Events ==
Confirmed tornadoes by Fujita rating
FU	F0	F1	F2	F3	F4	F5	Total
0	307	376	191	34	11	0	919

== January ==
52 tornadoes were reported in the U.S. in January.

=== January 9–12 ===
FU	F0	F1	F2	F3	F4	F5
0	1	28	14	1	1	0

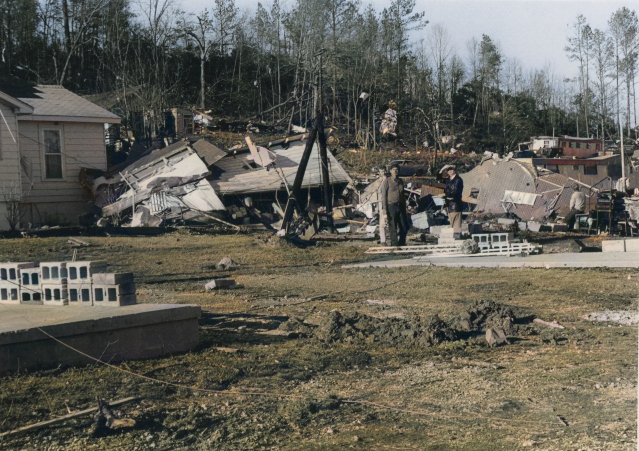
F3 tornado damage on January 12.

Between January 9 and 12, 1975, a panhandle hook cyclone produced tornadoes in the Southeast, including an F4 tornado that hit McComb, Mississippi killing 9 people. It is one of the largest January tornado outbreaks. Aside the tornadoes, the cyclone dumped at least 27" of snow in Riverton, Minnesota. In Willmar, Minnesota, 168 passengers were trapped in a stranded train because they couldn't walk to shelter due to wind chill values.

== February ==
45 tornadoes were reported in the U.S. in February.

=== February 22–24 ===
FU	F0	F1	F2	F3	F4	F5
0	1	8	11	2	1	0

A small outbreak of tornadoes impacted the Dixie Alley region, including an F4 tornado that hit Tuscaloosa, Alabama killing 1 person. An F2 tornado hit Altus, Oklahoma, killing 2 people.

== March ==
84 tornadoes were reported in the U.S. in March.

== April ==
108 tornadoes were reported in the U.S. in April.

=== April 23–24 ===
Three F4 tornadoes touched down in Missouri, the deadliest being an F4 striking Neosho, Missouri. More tornadoes touched down associated with this outbreak.

== May ==
188 tornadoes were reported in the U.S. in May.

=== May 6–7 ===
FU	F0	F1	F2	F3	F4	F5
0	11	6	14	3	2	0

An F4 tornado touched down in Sarpy County, Nebraska, with a path extending to Omaha. Damage estimates ranged from $250 million to $500 million. The number of homes destroyed was 287 with damage to 1400 others. The time of day aided in the warning process as a spotter saw the tornado in Sarpy County during the daylight hours and children were no longer in school. The NWS aided by REACT and Civil Defense systems provided good lead time for the residents of Douglas County, Nebraska. Three people did perish. An elderly woman died in her home and likely did not hear the warnings. A waitress was killed in a restaurant as she huddled with others in the restroom. A man was killed while seeking shelter at a gas station.

== June ==
196 tornadoes were reported in the U.S. in June.

=== June 28 ===
An F4 tornado tracked near Moorhead, Minnesota. No injuries or fatalities were reported with the tornado.

== July ==
79 tornadoes were reported in the U.S. in July.

=== July 23 ===
FU	F0	F1	F2	F3	F4	F5
0	1	0	0	2	0	0

A tornado which slashed through a three-block downtown area of the city killed three people. At least 55 others were injured, including 15 who were hospitalized. The tornado's winds were so forceful that a 15-foot wooden plank was driven through an auto engine block, splitting the front of the car in two. The tornado hit this central Illinois community of 15,000 during the early evening and decimated the business district, severed electrical power and gas lines, and sheared off roofs and uprooted scores of trees. It also overturned numerous automobiles and blew out hundreds of windows. Initial reports from the Illinois State Police placed the number of dead at four, but a spokesman said, "Early confusion probably accounted for duplicated reports." The area hit by the tornado included city square and another block farther south, and also caused extensive damage elsewhere.

== August ==
60 tornadoes were reported in the U.S. in August.

== September ==
34 tornadoes were reported in the U.S in September.

== October ==
12 tornadoes were reported in the U.S. in October.

== November ==
39 tornadoes were reported in the U.S. in November.

=== November 9–10 ===
A minor two-day tornado outbreak swept across Iowa, Illinois, and Indiana. The strongest tornado of the outbreak, an F3, struck the large city of Waterloo. An F2 tornado injured 4 people when striking the town of Lost Nation, Illinois. The same system that spawned the tornadoes was responsible for the sinking of the SS Edmund Fitzgerald on November 10.

== December ==
22 tornadoes were reported in the U.S. in December.

== See also ==
- Tornado
  - Tornadoes by year
  - Tornado records
  - Tornado climatology
  - Tornado myths
- List of tornado outbreaks
  - List of F5 and EF5 tornadoes
  - List of North American tornadoes and tornado outbreaks
  - List of 21st-century Canadian tornadoes and tornado outbreaks
  - List of European tornadoes and tornado outbreaks
  - List of tornadoes and tornado outbreaks in Asia
  - List of Southern Hemisphere tornadoes and tornado outbreaks
  - List of tornadoes striking downtown areas
- Tornado intensity
  - Fujita scale
  - Enhanced Fujita scale
