= Great Storm of 1975 =

Storm system in Central and Southeastern United States in 1975

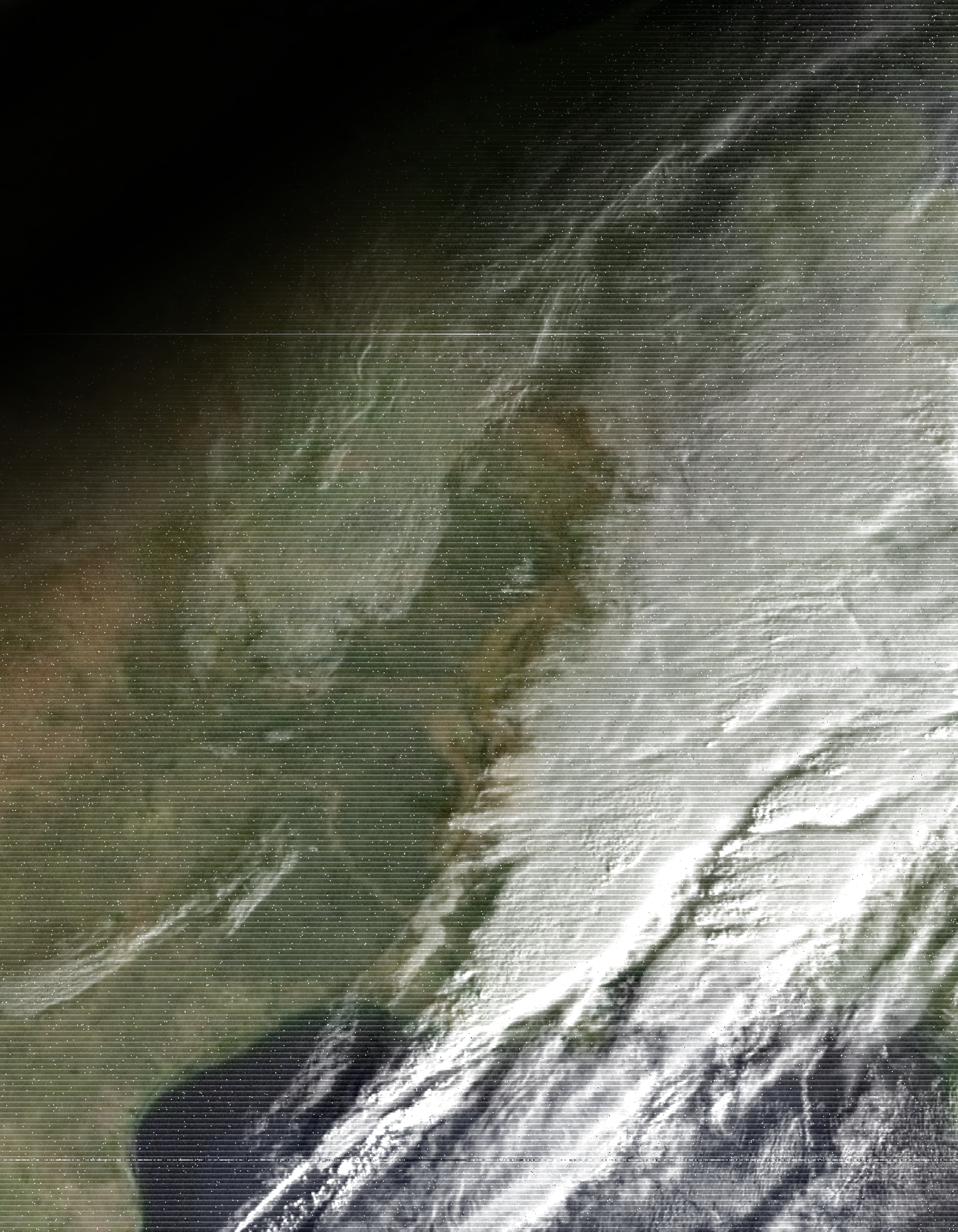
- Satellite imagery of the storm complex responsible for the blizzard and tornado outbreak on January 10

Meteorological history
- Formed: January 9, 1975
- Exited land: January 12, 1975

Category 3 "Major" winter storm
- Regional snowfall index: 6.12 (NOAA)
- Lowest pressure: 961 mbar (hPa); 28.38 inHg
- Max. snowfall: 27 in (69 cm) in Riverton, Minnesota

Tornado outbreak
- Tornadoes: 45
- Max. rating: F4 tornado
- Duration: January 9–12, 1975
- Highest winds: 81 mph (130 km/h) (highest convective wind)
- Largest hail: 1 3/4 in (4.4 cm)

Overall effects
- Fatalities: 58 (+12 tornadic)
- Injuries: Unknown (+377 tornadic)
- Damage: $20,000,000 ($119,670,000 in 2025 USD) (+$43,000,000 tornadic ($257,280,000 in 2025 USD))
- Areas affected: Midwestern and Southeastern United States
- Part of the 1974–75 North American winter and tornadoes and tornado outbreaks of 1975

The Great Storm of 1975 (also known as the Super Bowl Blizzard, Minnesota's Storm of the Century, or the Tornado Outbreak of January, 1975) was an intense winter storm system that impacted a large portion of the Central and Southeast United States from January 9–12, 1975. A classic panhandle hook, the mid-latitude cyclone produced an outbreak of 45 tornadoes in the Southeast U.S. resulting in 12 fatalities, while later dropping over 2 feet (61 cm) of snow and killing 58 people in the Midwest. This storm, which caused blizzard conditions, remains one of the worst blizzards to ever strike parts of the Midwest, as well as one of the largest January tornado outbreaks on record in the United States.

== Meteorological synopsis ==
The storm originated over the Pacific Ocean and crashed into the Northwest Pacific coast with damaging gale-force winds on January 8, 1975. By January 9 it had cleared the Rocky Mountains and began to redevelop and strengthen. At the same time, Arctic air was being drawn southward from Canada into the Great Plains, and large amounts of warm tropical air from the Gulf of Mexico were being pulled northward into much of the eastern U.S. The storm was a classic Panhandle Hook which moved from Colorado into Oklahoma before turning northward towards the Upper Midwest. It produced record low barometric pressure readings in the Midwest, with the pressure falling to an estimated 28.38 inHg (961 mb) just north of the Minnesota border in Canada.

== Tornado outbreak ==
=== Tornado summary event ===
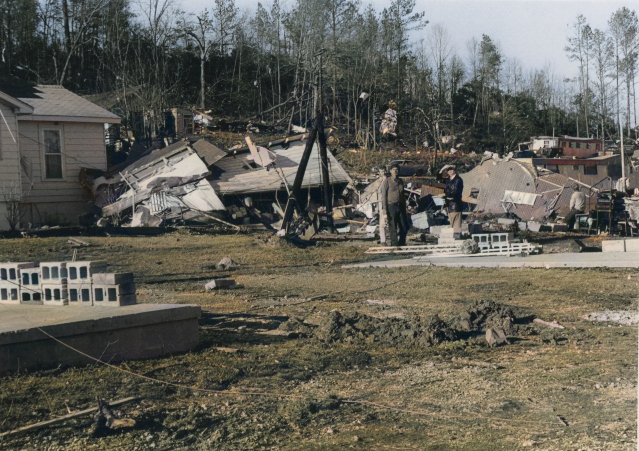
Damage from an F3 tornado in St. Clair County, Alabama

An unusual feature of this outbreak was that daytime heating, typically a key ingredient in the formation of tornadoes, had very little impact on their development. (Note: An outbreak is generally defined as a group of at least six tornadoes (the number sometimes varies slightly according to local climatology) with no more than a six-hour gap between individual tornadoes. An outbreak sequence, prior to (after) the start of modern records in 1950, is defined as a period of no more than two (one) consecutive days without at least one significant (F2 or stronger) tornado.) Rather, as the storm system pulled out into the central plains, strong thunderstorms and tornadoes quickly began to form despite the late hours. The first two tornadoes touched down after 10:00 p.m. CST on January 9 in Oklahoma and Louisiana. From there the progression of the twisters shifted eastward through the overnight and early morning hours, setting the stage for what would turn out to be a record-setting day on January 10. Texas saw five tornadoes between 1:30 a.m. and 3:30 a.m., one tornado touched down in Arkansas at 6:00 a.m., Louisiana saw seven tornadoes between 5:30 a.m. and 8:00 a.m. (killing one person), Mississippi had five tornadoes between 8:15 a.m. and 10:00 a.m. (killing nine), and Illinois and Indiana each experienced three lunch-hour tornadoes. The tornadic line of storms then shifted into Alabama (killing one) and Florida during the afternoon and evening hours.

Outbreak death toll
State	Total	County	County total
Alabama	1	St. Clair	1
Florida	1	Bay	1
Louisiana	1	Acadia	1
Mississippi	9	Lincoln	5
Mississippi	9	Pike	4
Totals	12		
All deaths were tornado-related

Mississippi and Alabama were the two states hardest hit by this outbreak. Alabama had the most twisters of any state with 13, but Mississippi saw the largest and deadliest tornado. An F4 tornado that tore through Pike, Lincoln, Lawrence, and Simpson Counties at 8:14 a.m. killed nine people and injured over 200, and severely damaged 38 blocks in the town of McComb. The 39 tornadoes on January 10 marked the most active tornadic day in January in U.S. history at that time. The 52 tornadoes during January 1975 also set a U.S. record for the most tornadoes during that month. Both of these records were broken in January 1999.

After a calm day on January 11, four more tornadoes touched down in Florida and Georgia on January 12, killing one person in Florida. By the time the outbreak ended it had produced 45 tornadoes, killed 12 people, injured 377 and caused $42 million in damages.

== Confirmed tornadoes ==
Confirmed tornadoes by Fujita rating
FU	F0	F1	F2	F3	F4	F5	Total
0	1	28	14	1	1	0	45

Prior to 1990, there is a likely undercount of tornadoes, particularly E/F0–1, with reports of weaker tornadoes becoming more common as population increased. A sharp increase in the annual average E/F0–1 count by approximately 200 tornadoes was noted upon the implementation of NEXRAD Doppler weather radar in 1990–1991. (Note: Historically, the number of tornadoes globally and in the United States was and is likely underrepresented: research by Grazulis on annual tornado activity suggests that, as of 2001, only 53% of yearly U.S. tornadoes were officially recorded. Documentation of tornadoes outside the United States was historically less exhaustive, owing to the lack of monitors in many nations and, in some cases, to internal political controls on public information. Most countries only recorded tornadoes that produced severe damage or loss of life. Significant low biases in U.S. tornado counts likely occurred through the early 1990s, when advanced NEXRAD was first installed and the National Weather Service began comprehensively verifying tornado occurrences.) 1974 marked the first year where significant tornado (E/F2+) counts became homogenous with contemporary values, attributed to the consistent implementation of Fujita scale assessments. (Note: The Fujita scale was devised under the aegis of scientist T. Theodore Fujita in the early 1970s. Prior to the advent of the scale in 1971, tornadoes in the United States were officially unrated. Tornado ratings were retroactively applied to events prior to the formal adoption of the F-scale by the National Weather Service. While the Fujita scale has been superseded by the Enhanced Fujita scale in the U.S. since February 1, 2007, Canada used the old scale until April 1, 2013; nations elsewhere, like the United Kingdom, apply other classifications such as the TORRO scale.) Numerous discrepancies on the details of tornadoes in this outbreak exist between sources. The total count of tornadoes and ratings differs from various agencies accordingly. The list below documents information from the most contemporary official sources alongside assessments from tornado historian Thomas P. Grazulis.

=== January 9 event ===
List of confirmed tornadoes
F#	Location	County	Time (UTC)	Path length	Damage
Oklahoma
F1	E of Ashland to SE of Arpelar	Pittsburg	0430	12.4 miles (19.8 km)	This tornado formed near the McAlester Army Ammunition Plant, then a naval ammunition depot, destroying five mobile homes. Assorted farmhouses and barns were damaged as well.
Louisiana
F2	N of Quebec to E of Transylvania	Madison, East Carroll	0440	18 miles (28.8 km)	This strong tornado developed near Bear Lake, unroofing a home and partly unroofing another. A few other homes and four outbuildings were destroyed nearby. Farther along, in the Alsatia–Transylvania area, the tornado badly damaged seven homes and destroyed a pair of trailers. Many outbuildings and barns were wrecked. A parsonage, church, and vegetation were extensively damaged. A final home was severely damaged near the end of the path. Six people were officially injured, but the actual total may have been three.

=== January 10 event ===
List of confirmed tornadoes
F#	Location	County	Time (UTC)	Path length	Damage
Arkansas
F1	Springdale area	Washington	0655	0.5 miles (0.8 km)	A trio of mobile homes were wrecked, and the roof of a frame home was badly damaged. Five injuries occurred.
Texas
F2	Daingerfield area	Morris	0730	0.3 miles (0.5 km)	Doors were torn loose. Carports, roofing, and small trailers received damage.
F2	Hooks area	Bowie	0800	4 miles (6.4 km)	A number of outbuildings were destroyed or damaged. A garage was moved 150 ft (50 yd), and a 2-mile-long (3.2 km) stretch of trees was felled. A pair of unanchored trailers were flipped and wrecked, and three homes were badly damaged.
F1	La Marque area	Galveston	0955	0.1 miles (0.16 km)	
F1	Jasper area	Jasper	1030	0.1 miles (0.16 km)	
F1	Kountze area	Jefferson	1030	0.1 miles (0.16 km)	
Louisiana
F1	Vinton	Calcasieu	1125	0.5 miles (0.8 km)	An arena, mobile home, and house were damaged.
F1	SE of Fishville	Grant	1230	0.1 miles (0.16 km)	Approximately 70 trees were downed, along with a barn.
F1	Jennings to Evangeline	Jefferson Davis, Acadia	1315	7.6 miles (12.2 km)	Three mobile homes were destroyed, and roofing was damaged. Three people were injured.
F1	NE of Oak Grove	West Carroll	1315	0.5 miles (0.8 km)	Many homes and trailers were damaged. An injury was reported.
F1	S of Mermentau to Crowley	Acadia	1335	13.5 miles (21.6 km)	1 death – A trailer was destroyed near the touchdown point, resulting in the fatality. In Crowley, six trailers and seven homes were damaged. Eight people were injured.
F1	Lawtell area	St. Landry	1400	1 miles (1.6 km)	A gym at a school was unroofed. Five students were injured.
Arkansas
F1	S of Stuttgart	Arkansas	1210	0.5 miles (0.8 km)	Nine Arkansas Power and Light transmission towers were downed.
Mississippi
F4	SW of McComb to SW of Pinola	Pike, Lincoln, Lawrence, Simpson	1414	56.5 miles (90.4 km)	9 deaths – This long-tracked tornado, possibly a family, first destroyed a marina and seven structures, while uprooting or snapping at least 10,000 trees. Major damage affected 38 blocks in McComb and extended into Summit. In the McComb–Summit area, 88 homes, 80 apartment units, 60 businesses, two schools, two National Guard armories, and 200 automobiles were badly damaged or destroyed. The tornado injured five students, out of 325 who had taken shelter in a school. Just past McComb, 36 more homes were wrecked. Many homes, trailers, outbuildings, and barns were destroyed in rural areas as well. In the community of Camper, a trailer was destroyed, with its remains wrapped around a utility pole. 210 people were injured.
F1	SE of Linwood to NW of Selma	Adams	1448	11.9 miles (19 km)	20 large trees were uprooted. Piping and barns were destroyed, and six homes mildly damaged. One home sustained moderate damage, and a fallen tree damaged an automobile.
F2	Clinton to SE of Flora	Hinds, Madison	1555	15 miles (24 km)	This tornado overturned a truck on I-20. It also destroyed a home and badly damaged another. One person was injured.
F2	SE of Greenfield	Rankin	1610	4.5 miles (7.2 km)	A few empty chicken coops were wrecked and a number of barns partly so. Four homes incurred modest damage, and trees were felled as well. A mobile home was wrecked and a pair of others flipped.
F1	S of Biloxi	Harrison	2000	0.5 miles (0.8 km)	A waterspout hit Old Fort Massachusetts on Ship Island.
F1	W of Pascagoula	Jackson	2025	2.5 miles (4 km)	Only minor damage was reported.
F2	N of Helena	Jackson	2030	0.1 miles (0.16 km)	A brief touchdown destroyed a few homes and a pair of trailers.
Illinois
F2	SE of Raleigh	Saline	1715	2 miles (3.2 km)	Half a dozen hangars lost roofing and siding, and a few airplanes inside were damaged. Outbuildings and a porch were damaged on a farmstead, and debris from one of the hangars was found in a tree on the property. A garage was leveled, crushing an automobile underneath, and a trailer was destroyed. Three homes sustained damage to parts of their roofs as well, one of which lost a whole section of roofing.
F1	Old Shawneetown area	Gallatin	1732	0.1 miles (0.16 km)	A high school lost portions of its roofing.
Indiana
F1	Harwood area	Vanderburgh	1825	0.5 miles (0.8 km)	A few garages were wrecked, and many power lines and trees were felled. Roofing and siding on a number of homes was inconsequentially damaged.
Alabama
F1	NE of East Brookwood	Tuscaloosa	2030	0.1 miles (0.16 km)	
F1	Citronelle area	Mobile	2045	0.1 miles (0.16 km)	
F1	N of Faunsdale	Marengo	2045	0.1 miles (0.16 km)	
F2	N of Porter	Jefferson	2045	2 miles (3.2 km)	A short-lived tornado destroyed four houses and two trailers, and four people had minor injuries.
F1	Vestavia Hills area	Jefferson	2145	0.1 miles (0.16 km)	
F1	Keystone area	Shelby	2200	0.2 miles (0.32 km)	14 injuries
F3	W of Pell City to NE of Ragland	St. Clair	2215	18.8 miles (30 km)	1 death – In Pell City, the tornado destroyed 49 homes and damaged 259 others, and 15 trailers and 27 businesses were damaged or destroyed. The tornado also destroyed five homes in Ragland, where 48 others were damaged.
F1	NW of Loxley	Baldwin	2215	0.1 miles (0.16 km)	
F1	Prattville area	Autauga	2245	0.1 miles (0.16 km)	
F2	SW of Montgomery	Montgomery	2250	2 miles (3.2 km)	
F2	SW of Davisville	Macon	0000	1 miles (1.6 km)	A brief tornado produced major damage in the Cotton Valley area, destroying 17 homes and damaging 28 others.
F2	NE of Salem	Lee	2030	0.1 miles (0.16 km)	A brief touchdown destroyed three homes and five trailers. It also damaged 22 homes and injured six people.
F1	E of Ranburne	Cleburne	2030	0.1 miles (0.16 km)	
Florida
F1	W of Mary Esther	Okaloosa	2355	1 miles (1.6 km)	
F0	N of Ponce de Leon	Holmes	0130	0.1 miles (0.16 km)	
North Carolina
F2	W of Selica	Transylvania	0230	4.3 miles (6.9 km)	

=== January 12 event ===
List of confirmed tornadoes
F#	Location	County	Time (UTC)	Path length	Damage
Florida
F1	SW of Greenhead to N of Horrsville	Washington, Jackson	1615	53 miles (84.8 km)	A tornado, possibly a tornado family, destroyed a barn, and a house lost its roof. 12 people were injured.
F2	Panama City to NE of Bethel, GA	Bay, Calhoun, Jackson, Seminole (GA), Decatur (GA), Mitchell (GA), Worth (GA), Turner (GA)	1620	168.5 miles (269.6 km)	1 death – This was probably a family of skipping and shorter-lived tornadoes. In Florida, 25 homes and trailers were torn apart. In Georgia, many trees were snapped and uprooted, and buildings were destroyed at an industrial park. 100 homes and 50 trailers were damaged in Georgia as well. A total of 18 people were injured.
Georgia
F2	Lyons area	Toombs	2215	2 miles (3.2 km)	A brief tornado overturned trailers and tore roofs from several homes, and businesses in the area were destroyed.

== Blizzard ==
As the storm system began to move northeastward out of Oklahoma, the cool air pulled down behind the system interacted with the moisture being pulled northward to produce snow over a large part of the Midwest. The snow began falling on Friday, January 10 and continued for the next two days. Snowfall of a foot (30.5 cm) or more was common from Nebraska to Minnesota, with 27 inches (69 cm) in Riverton, Minnesota. The heaviest snow fell to the west of the low pressure center, which tracked from northeast Iowa through central Minnesota up to Lake Superior. Sustained winds of 30–50 mph (48–80 km/h) with gusts from 70–90 mph (110–140 km/h) produced snowdrifts up to 20 feet (6 m) in some locations.

Sioux Falls, South Dakota saw visibilities of below 1/4 mile (0.4 km) for 24 straight hours, and just east of Sioux Falls a 2,000-foot (610 m) broadcast tower collapsed. In Willmar, Minnesota, 168 passengers were trapped in a stranded train for hours, unable to walk to shelter because of dangerously low wind chill values. In Omaha, Nebraska a foot (31 cm) of snow fell, Sioux Falls saw 7 inches (18 cm), Duluth, Minnesota saw 8 inches (20 cm), and International Falls, Minnesota saw 24 inches (61 cm).

Record low pressures were recorded in communities in Nebraska, Minnesota, Illinois, and Wisconsin, with a low of 28.55 inHg (967 mb) in Duluth, Minnesota. Approximately 58 people died from effects of the blizzard and over 100,000 farm animals were lost. The combination of snowfall totals, wind velocities, and cold temperatures made this one of the most severe blizzards the Upper Midwest had experienced.

== Record events ==
This storm system had, in part, a large effect on the weather in the entire eastern half of the country. A number of different weather records (at the time) were set during the four days of this storm, especially in daily high temperatures, wind gusts, low barometric pressure readings, and number of tornadoes.

=== Daily high temperatures ===
==== January 10 ====
- Chicago: 60 °F (16 °C)
- Indianapolis, Indiana: 62 °F (17 °C)
- Louisville, Kentucky: 66 °F (19 °C)
- South Bend, Indiana: 61 °F (16 °C)

==== January 11 ====
- New York City: 65 °F (18 °C)
- Providence, Rhode Island: 61 °F (16 °C)
- Washington, D.C.: 75 °F (24 °C)

=== Low pressure measurements ===
- Duluth, Minnesota: 28.55 inHg (967 mb)
- Minneapolis, Minnesota: 28.62 inHg (969 mb)
- Rochester, Minnesota: 28.67 inHg (971 mb)
- Milwaukee, Wisconsin: 28.86 inHg (977 mb)
- Rockford, Illinois: 28.87 inHg (978 mb)
- St. Louis, Missouri: 28.93 inHg (980 mb)

=== Tornadoes ===
- Most tornadoes on one day in January: 39
- Most tornadoes in the United States during January: 52

== See also ==
- List of Minnesota weather records
- List of North American tornadoes and tornado outbreaks

== Sources ==
- Agee, Ernest M.; Childs, Samuel (June 1, 2014). "Adjustments in Tornado Counts, F-Scale Intensity, and Path Width for Assessing Significant Tornado Destruction". Journal of Applied Meteorology and Climatology. 53 (6). American Meteorological Society: 1494–1505. Bibcode:2014JApMC..53.1494A. doi:10.1175/JAMC-D-13-0235.1.
- Brooks, Harold E. (April 2004). "On the Relationship of Tornado Path Length and Width to Intensity". Weather and Forecasting. 19 (2): 310–19. Bibcode:2004WtFor..19..310B. doi:10.1175/1520-0434(2004)019<0310:OTROTP>2.0.CO;2.
- Cook, A. R.; Schaefer, J. T. (August 2008). "The Relation of El Niño–Southern Oscillation (ENSO) to Winter Tornado Outbreaks". Monthly Weather Review. 136 (8): 3121–3137. Bibcode:2008MWRv..136.3121C. doi:10.1175/2007MWR2171.1.
- Edwards, Roger; LaDue, James G.; Ferree, John T.; Scharfenberg, Kevin; Maier, Chris; Coulbourne, William L. (May 1, 2013). "Tornado Intensity Estimation: Past, Present, and Future". Bulletin of the American Meteorological Society. 94 (5). American Meteorological Society: 641–653. Bibcode:2013BAMS...94..641E. doi:10.1175/BAMS-D-11-00006.1.
- Grazulis, Thomas P. (May 1984). Violent Tornado Climatography, 1880–1982. OSTI (Technical report). NUREG. Washington, D.C.: Nuclear Regulatory Commission. OSTI 7099491. CR-3670.
  - — (November 1990). Significant Tornadoes 1880–1989. Vol. 2. St. Johnsbury, Vermont: The Tornado Project of Environmental Films. ISBN 1-879362-02-3.
  - — (July 1993). Significant Tornadoes 1680–1991: A Chronology and Analysis of Events. St. Johnsbury, Vermont: The Tornado Project of Environmental Films. ISBN 1-879362-03-1.
  - — (2001a). The Tornado: Nature's Ultimate Windstorm. Norman: University of Oklahoma Press. ISBN 978-0-8061-3538-0.
  - — (2001b). F5-F6 Tornadoes. St. Johnsbury, Vermont: The Tornado Project of Environmental Films.
- National Weather Service (January 1975). Storm Data Publication (Report). National Centers for Environmental Information – via Storm Events Database.
- National Weather Service (January 1975). "Storm Data and Unusual Weather Phenomena". Storm Data. 17 (1). Asheville, North Carolina: National Climatic Data Center.
