= Dixon Public Schools =

School district in Illinois, United States

Dixon Unit School District 170, also known as Dixon Public Schools, is a school district headquartered in Dixon, Illinois.

The district is mostly in Lee County, where it includes Dixon and Nachusa. A portion is in Ogle County, where it includes Grand Detour and the vast majority of Lost Nation.

== History ==
Margo Empen was superintendent until her retirement on July 1, 2026. Melydi Huyett became the superintendent on July 1, 2026. Huyett, an alumna of Dixon Public Schools, was previously the principal of Centennial Elementary School in Polo, Illinois.

== Schools ==
Secondary schools

- Dixon High School
- Reagan Middle School

Elementary schools

- Jefferson Elementary School
- * Madison Elementary School

Washington Elementary School

- Thomas J. Dempsey Day School
