= Grand Detour, Illinois =

Grand Detour
- CDP
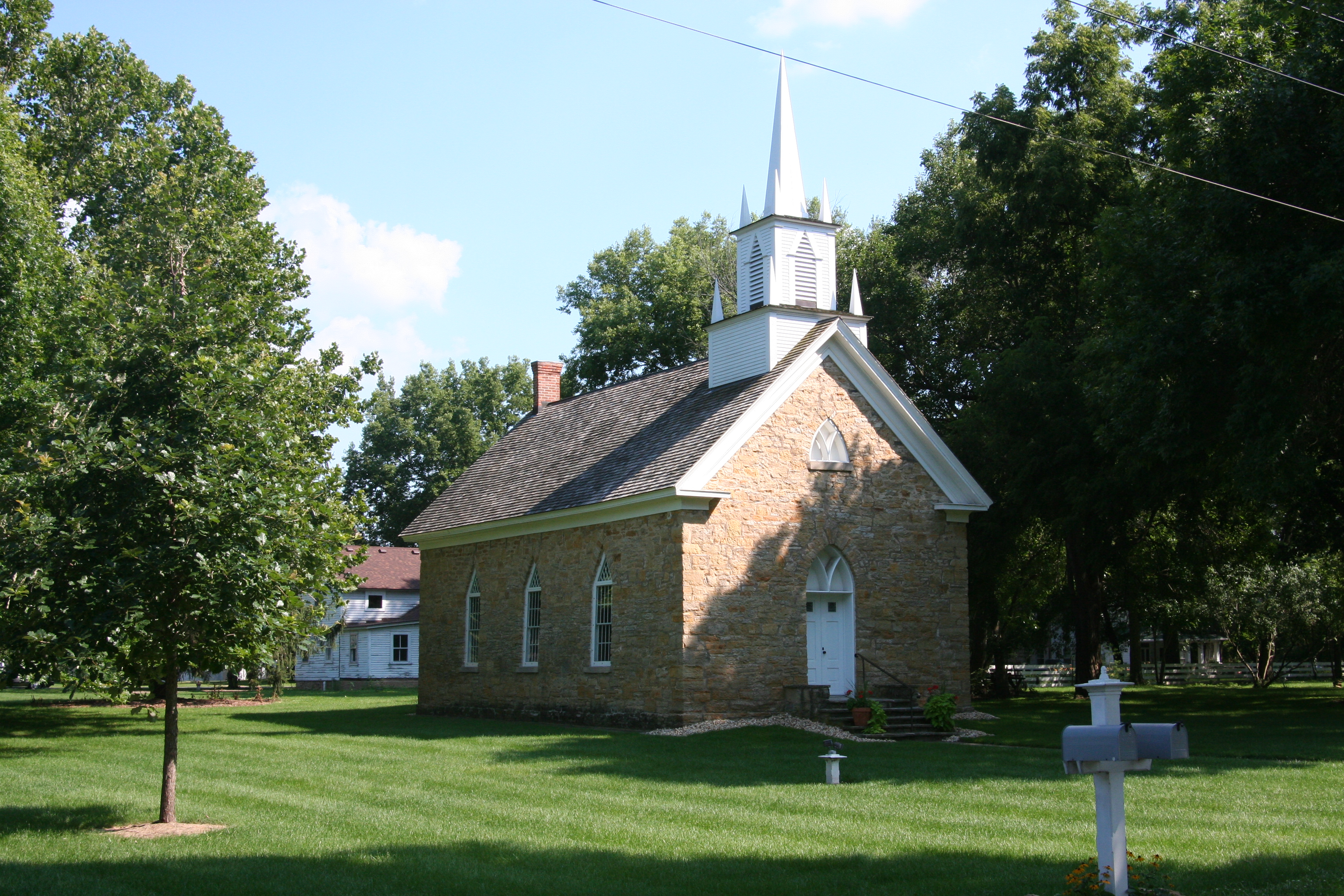
- St. Peter's Episcopal Church in Grand Detour

- Location within Ogle County Grand Detour (Illinois)
- Coordinates: 41°53′48″N 89°24′42″W
- Country: United States
- State: Illinois
- County: Ogle
- Township: Grand Detour

Area
  - Total: 1.41 sq mi (3.66 km^{2})
  - Land: 1.17 sq mi (3.03 km^{2})
  - Water: 0.24 sq mi (0.63 km^{2})
- Elevation: 656 ft (200 m)

Population (2020)
  - Total: 424
  - Density: 362.5/sq mi (139.95/km^{2})
- Time zone: UTC-6 (CST)
  - Summer (DST): UTC-5 (CDT)
- Zip code: 61040
- Area code: 815
- FIPS code: 17-30705
- GNIS feature ID: 2629859

Grand Detour is an unincorporated census-designated place in Ogle County, Illinois, United States. As of the 2020 census, Grand Detour had a population of 424. The village is named after an odd turn in the Rock River, which flows north past the village, rather than its normal southwestern course. John Deere invented the steel plow in Grand Detour, and the John Deere House and Shop is a U.S. National Historic Landmark.

Historical population
Census	Pop.	Note	%±
2020	424		—
U.S. Decennial Census

== History ==
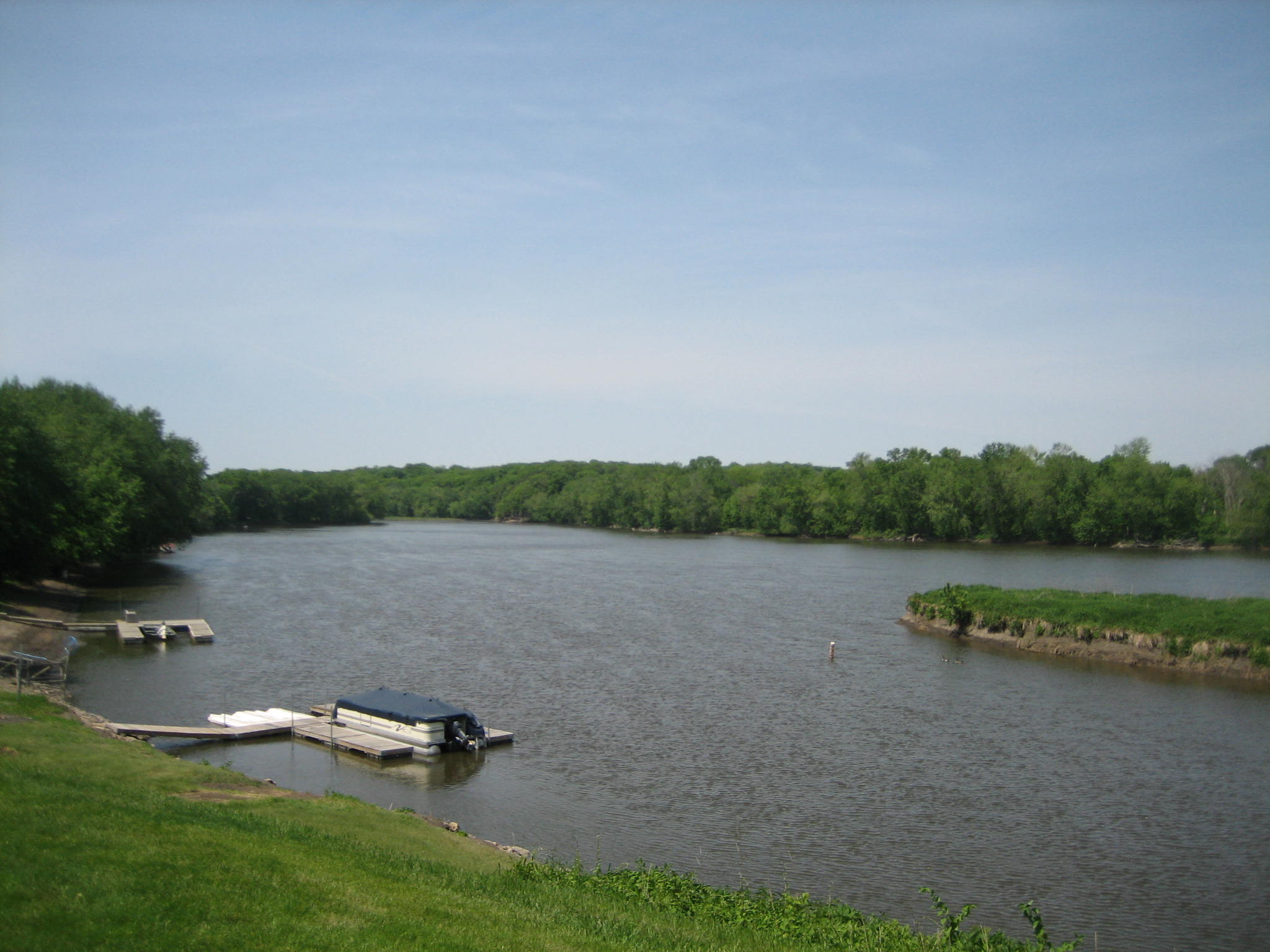
The Rock River in Grand Detour

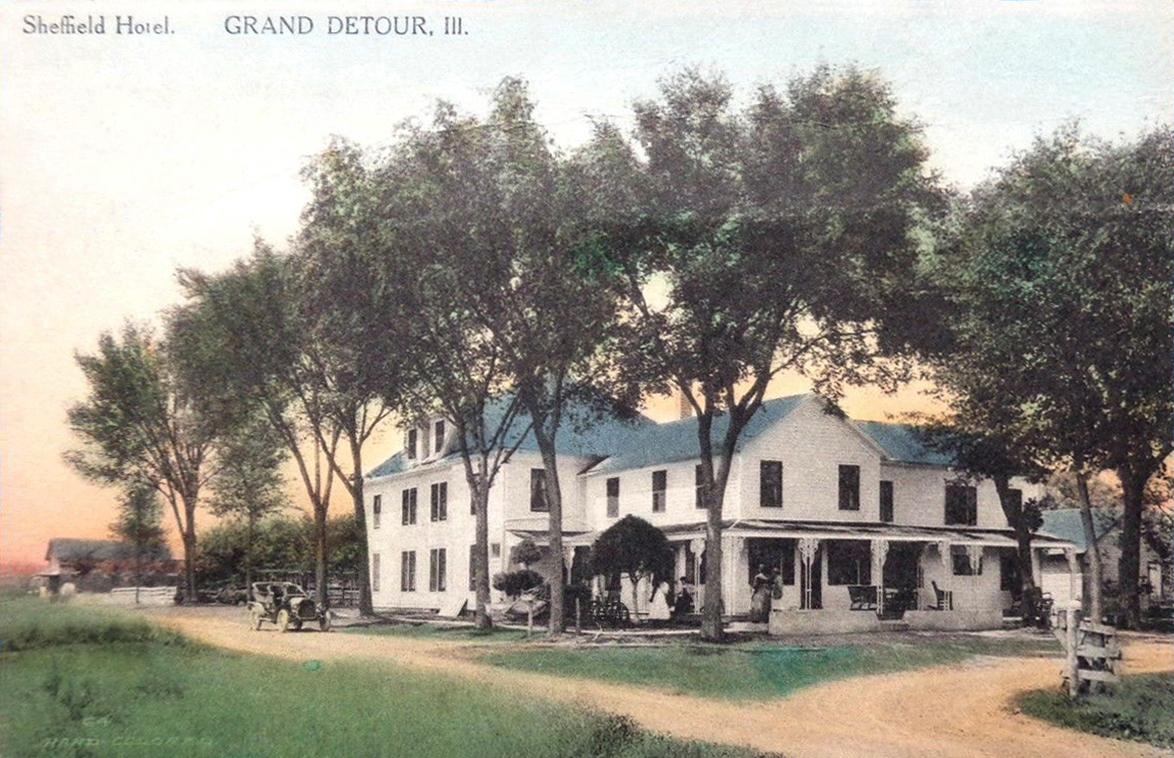
The Sheffield Hotel in Grand Detour, purchased by Orson Welles's father

Grand Detour was founded in 1835 by Leonard Andrus (1805–1867) of Vermont. In 1836 Andrus welcomed his friend and fellow Vermont native John Deere to the town, where Deere built a house and established a forge. Deere manufactured pitchforks and shovels, and in 1837 he invented the first successful steel plow. The first was sold in 1838.

The John Deere Historic Site in Grand Detour is operated by the John Deere Company. The John Deere House and Shop is listed on the National Register of Historic Places; it joined that list in 1966, the year the Register was established. It was designated a National Historic Landmark in 1964.

The village soon grew to include a dam, race and sawmill, a flour mill and several stores.

In 1847, Rev. Abraham Joseph Warner established an Episcopal parish in Grand Detour, then regarded as one of the most important settlements in the region. Construction began on St. Peter's Episcopal Church in 1849, and the building was completed in 1850. Soon thereafter, Grand Detour lost most of its residents as the railroad developed towns to the east and south. The little stone church closed and remained vacant for almost 50 years. In 1909, as Grand Detour's beauty attracted a growing community of artists, Leonard Andrus's son William repaired the church. Services were held weekly by the priest of nearby Dixon, Illinois. The historic church was restored by a nonprofit community group in 1999, and it is now available for public and private events.

In the mid-1920s Orson Welles spent a few months of the year in the summer resort town of Grand Detour, at a small country hotel that was purchased by his father, Richard Head Welles. The Sheffield Hotel was built in 1865 as a small inn to house workers at the plow factory. It was destroyed in a fire May 14, 1928, shortly after Welles turned 13 years of age.

"It was called Grand Detour because the Rock River circles there — it's almost an island," Welles remembered some 50 years later:

It really was a marvelous little corner in time, a kind of forgotten place … A childhood there was like a childhood back in the 1870s. No electric light, horse-drawn buggies — a completely anachronistic, old-fashioned, early-Tarkington, rural kind of life, with a country store that had above it a ballroom with an old dance floor with springs in it, so that folks would feel light on their feet. When I was little, nobody had danced up there for many years, but I used to sneak up at night and dance by moonlight with the dust rising from the floor … Grand Detour was one of those lost worlds, one of those Edens that you get thrown out of."

== Education ==
It is in the Dixon Unit School District 170. Its comprehensive high school is Dixon High School.

== Notable people ==
- John Deere (1804–1886), blacksmith and manufacturer, lived in Grand Detour from 1836 to 1848.
- Stan Hack, (1909–1979), Chicago Cubs manager and player, operated Stan Hack's Landmark restaurant in Grand Detour until his death in 1979.
- Orson Welles (1915–1985), director, actor, writer, producer, and magician. Welles was childhood resident of Grand Detour.
