= Magnet, Nebraska =

Village in Cedar County, Nebraska, United States

- Village
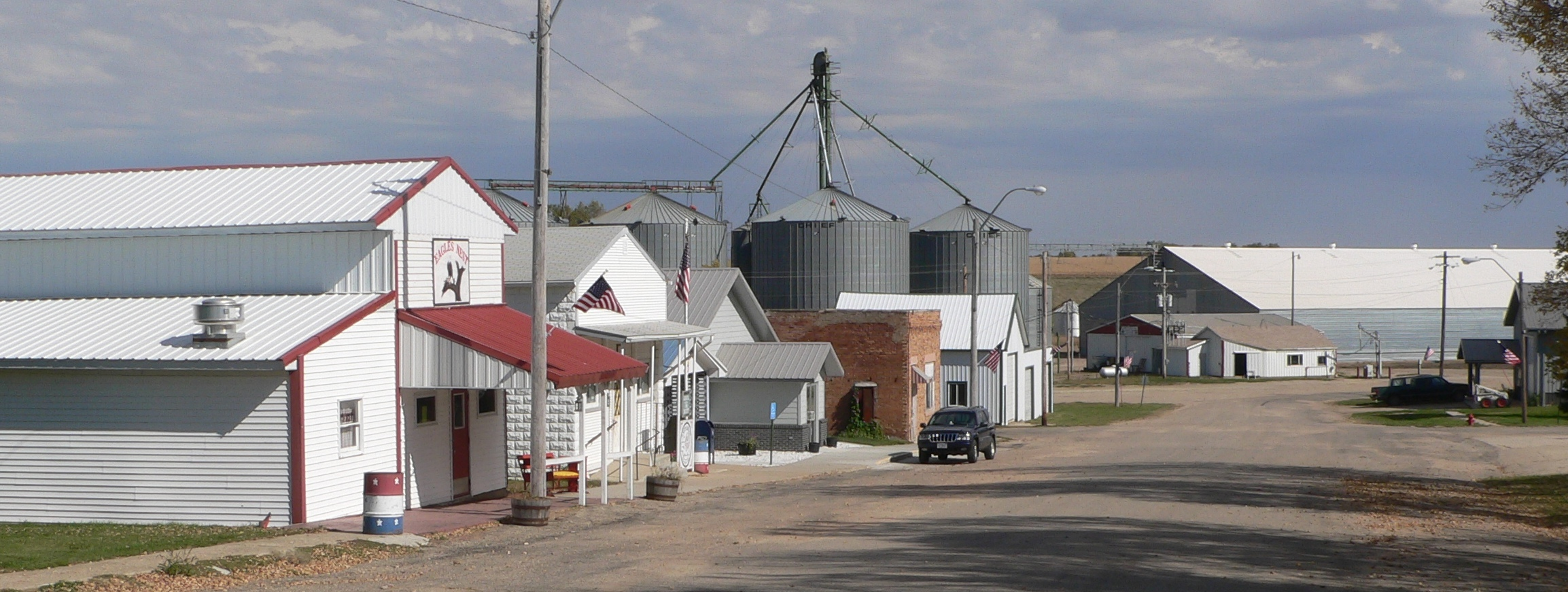
- Downtown Magnet: Main Street, looking east October 2010

- Location of Magnet, Nebraska
- Coordinates: 42°27′22″N 97°28′09″W
- Country: United States
- State: Nebraska
- County: Cedar

Area
  - Total: 0.15 sq mi (0.39 km^{2})
  - Land: 0.15 sq mi (0.39 km^{2})
  - Water: 0 sq mi (0.00 km^{2})
- Elevation: 1,818 ft (554 m)

Population (2020)
  - Total: 46
  - Estimate (2021): 46
  - Density: 310/sq mi (120/km^{2})
- Time zone: UTC-6 (Central (CST))
  - Summer (DST): UTC-5 (CDT)
- ZIP code: 68749
- Area code: 402
- FIPS code: 31-30310
- GNIS feature ID: 2399222

Magnet is a village in Cedar County, Nebraska, United States. The population was 46 at the 2020 census.

== Geography ==
According to the United States Census Bureau, the village has a total area of 0.15 square miles (0.39 km^{2}), all land.

== Demographics ==
Historical population
Census	Pop.	Note	%±
1910	178		—
1920	153		−14.0%
1930	160		4.6%
1940	152		−5.0%
1950	115		−24.3%
1960	116		0.9%
1970	88		−24.1%
1980	59		−33.0%
1990	69		16.9%
2000	79		14.5%
2010	57		−27.8%
2020	43		−24.6%
U.S. Decennial Census

=== 2010 census ===
As of the census of 2010, there were 57 people, 29 households, and 18 families residing in the village. The population density was 380.0 inhabitants per square mile (146.7/km^{2}). There were 38 housing units at an average density of 253.3 per square mile (97.8/km^{2}). The racial makeup of the village was 94.7% White and 5.3% Native American.

There were 29 households, of which 20.7% had children under the age of 18 living with them, 37.9% were married couples living together, 20.7% had a female householder with no husband present, 3.4% had a male householder with no wife present, and 37.9% were non-families. 34.5% of all households were made up of individuals, and 17.2% had someone living alone who was 65 years of age or older. The average household size was 1.97 and the average family size was 2.50.

The median age in the village was 50.8 years. 21.1% of residents were under the age of 18; 3.5% were between the ages of 18 and 24; 19.4% were from 25 to 44; 35.1% were from 45 to 64; and 21.1% were 65 years of age or older. The gender makeup of the village was 50.9% male and 49.1% female.

=== 2000 census ===
As of the census of 2000, there were 79 people, 37 households, and 20 families residing in the village. The population density was 547.7 inhabitants per square mile (211.5/km^{2}). There were 39 housing units at an average density of 270.4 per square mile (104.4/km^{2}). The racial makeup of the village was 94.94% White, 3.80% Native American, and 1.27% from two or more races.

There were 37 households, out of which 13.5% had children under the age of 18 living with them, 43.2% were married couples living together, 5.4% had a female householder with no husband present, and 45.9% were non-families. 35.1% households were made up of individuals, and 16.2% had someone living alone who was 65 years of age or older. The average household size was 2.14 and the average family size was 2.80.

In the village, the population was spread out, with 16.5% under the age of 18, 7.6% from 18 to 24, 34.2% from 25 to 44, 21.5% from 45 to 64, and 20.3% who were 65 years of age or older. The median age was 39 years. For every 100 females, there were 113.5 males. For every 100 females age 18 and over, there were 127.6 males.

As of 2000 the median income for a household in the village was $36,250, and the median income for a family was $36,250. Males had a median income of $24,000 versus $21,667 for females. The per capita income for the village was $15,357. There were no families and 1.3% of the population living below the poverty line, including no under eighteens and 10.0% of those over 64.

== History ==
Magnet was platted in 1893 when the Chicago, St. Paul, Minneapolis and Omaha Railway was extended to that point. Magnet was so named by its founder B. E. Smith, who hoped to attract settlers to the region "as the magnet attracts iron".

=== Town motto and disasters ===
Magnet's motto: "Magnet: The town too tough to die!" came from a variety of disasters that have struck the town over the course of its history. In February 1925 a fire burned one block of Main Street. The first tornado of two to strike Magnet happened on June 18, 1937. It tore through the town, destroying many businesses and homes. Thousands of people came to survey the damage on the Sunday following the storm. Over the summer of 1937 the town was cleaned up and through the help of neighboring towns, buildings and farms were restored.

The second tornado struck Magnet on May 6, 1975 at 2:45 pm. The devastating tornado ripped through the town, destroying 2 homes and heavily damaging many more. A Carhart Lumber truck from Randolph came into town, bringing a load of plywood sheets. They were used for temporary repairs to protect damaged homes from the elements. The town was without lights and water, so the fire department from the neighboring town of Wausa brought in emergency generator units. Workers from the power company labored throughout the night to restore electrical service to the main part of town. It took over a week to replace broken poles and wires. Drinking water was brought in milk creamer cans. Help from neighboring towns came during the summer to assist with the clean-up.

=== Railroad ===
The Chicago, St. Paul, Minneapolis, and Omaha Railroad went from Randolph to Magnet, then on to Bloomfield. Travelers who came to Magnet in 1894 had only a platform and an old box car to unload on when they arrived. During 1905–06, everything came by mail, groceries, farm goods, etc. In 1948–49, there was a very bad winter; at one time there was no train for six weeks. In the 1950s the train only came through three times a week. The tracks were eventually torn up in 1965.

=== Jail House ===
The jailhouse was built circa 1902. Bars on the windows were set to keep the prisoners in. Before it was moved it was an old voting booth. In the 1960s the building was moved and added on to serve as the county shed. It was one of the buildings that was destroyed by the tornado in 1975.

== See also ==
- List of municipalities in Nebraska
