= Nachusa, Illinois =

- Unincorporated community
- Location within Illinois Location within the United States
- Coordinates: 41°50′02″N 89°22′48″W
- Country: United States
- State: Illinois
- County: Lee
- Township: Nachusa

Area
  - Total: 0.76 sq mi (1.98 km^{2})
  - Land: 0.76 sq mi (1.98 km^{2})
  - Water: 0 sq mi (0.00 km^{2})
- Elevation: 784 ft (239 m)

Population (2020)
  - Total: 137
  - Density: 179.4/sq mi (69.25/km^{2})
- Time zone: UTC-6 (Central (CST))
  - Summer (DST): UTC-5 (CDT)
- ZIP code: 61057
- Area codes: 815 & 779
- GNIS feature ID: 2806532

Nachusa is an unincorporated community in Lee County, Illinois, United States, located 5 miles (8.0 km) east of Dixon. As of the 2020 census, Nachusa had a population of 137. Nachusa has a post office with ZIP code 61057. Nachusa is located on the old C&NW main line between Chicago and Omaha.

== History ==
A post office called Nachusa has been in operation since 1855. The name Nachusa is said to be derived from Sac or Fox Indian.

Nachusa first appeared as a census designated place in the 2020 U.S. census.

== Geography ==
According to the 2021 census gazetteer files, Nachusa has a total area of 0.76 square miles (1.97 km^{2}), all land.

== Demographics ==
Historical population
Census	Pop.	Note	%±
2020	137		—
U.S. Decennial Census

As of the 2020 census there were 137 people, 40 households, and 40 families residing in the CDP. The population density was 179.32 inhabitants per square mile (69.24/km^{2}). There were 61 housing units at an average density of 79.84 per square mile (30.83/km^{2}). The racial makeup of the CDP was 91.97% White, 0.00% African American, 0.00% Native American, 0.00% Asian, 0.00% Pacific Islander, 2.19% from other races, and 5.84% from two or more races. Hispanic or Latino of any race were 4.38% of the population.

There were 40 households, out of which 25.0% had children under the age of 18 living with them, 100.00% were married couples living together, none had a female householder with no husband present, and none were non-families. No households were made up of individuals. The average household size was 2.48 and the average family size was 2.48.

The CDP's age distribution consisted of 24.6% under the age of 18, 2.5% from 18 to 24, 7.4% from 25 to 44, 18% from 45 to 64, and 47.5% who were 65 years of age or older. The median age was 52.7 years. For every 100 females, there were 82.1 males. For every 100 females age 18 and over, there were 84.0 males.

The per capita income for the CDP was $26,425.

== Education ==
It is in the Dixon Unit School District 170. The comprehensive high school of that district is Dixon High School.

== See also ==
- Nachusa Grasslands, a tallgrass prairie conservancy located nearby.
