= John Deere House and Shop =

- John Deere Home and Shop
- U.S. National Register of Historic Places
- U.S. National Historic Landmark
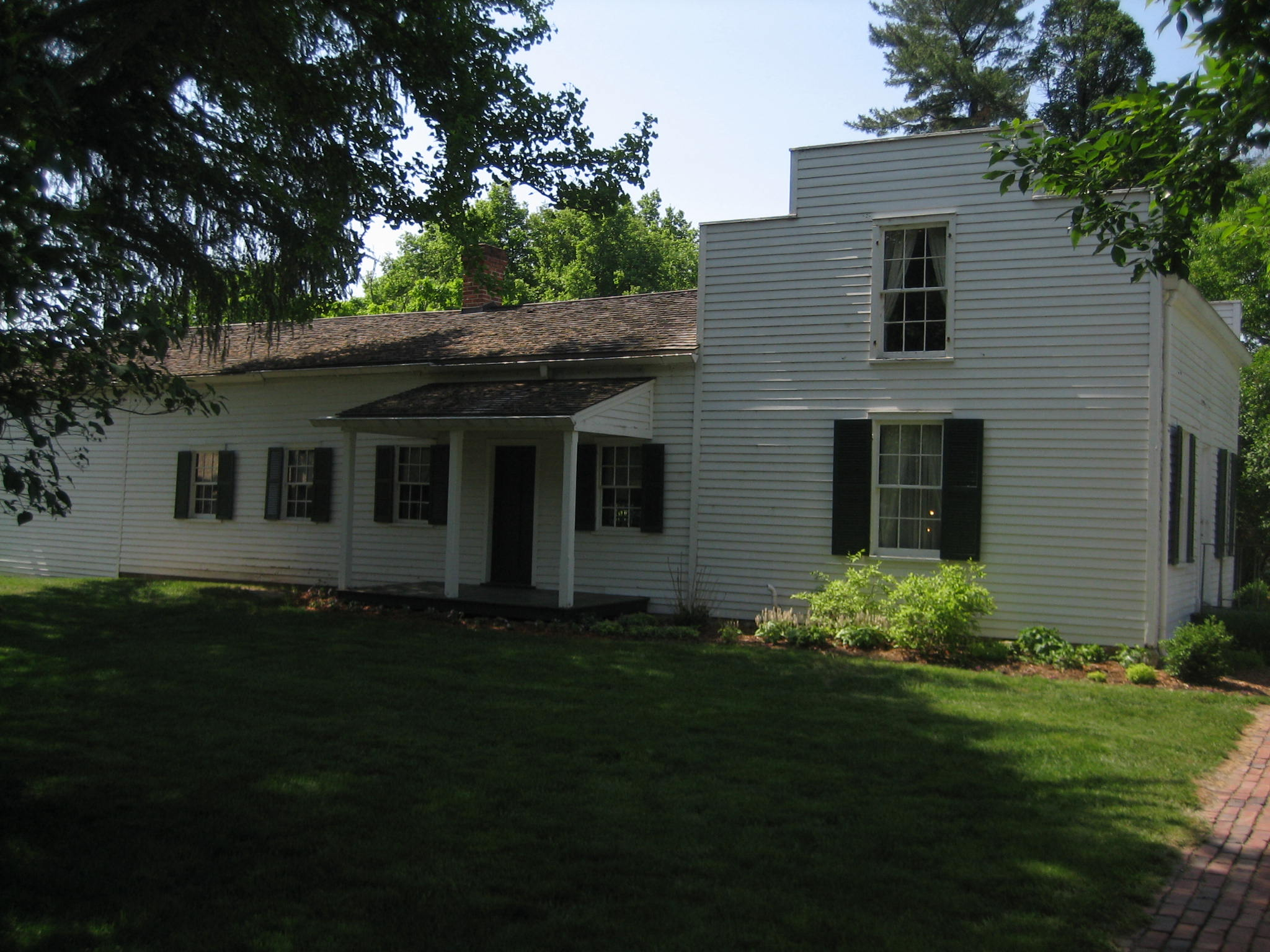
- The 1836 John Deere House

- Location within Illinois Location within the United States
- Location: Illinois and Clinton Sts., Grand Detour, Illinois
- Coordinates: 41°50′20″N 89°28′46″W
- Area: 4 acres (1.6 ha)
- Built: 1836, et al.
- Architect: John Deere (House)
- Architectural style: Vernacular
- NRHP reference No.: 66000327

Significant dates
- Added to NRHP: October 15, 1966
- Designated NHL: July 19, 1964

The John Deere House and Shop is located in the unincorporated village of Grand Detour, Illinois, near the Lee County city of Dixon. The site is known as the location where the first steel plow was invented by John Deere in 1837. The site includes Deere's house, a replica of his original blacksmith shop, a gift shop, and an archaeological exhibit showing the excavation site of his original blacksmith shop. The Deere House and Shop is listed on the National Register of Historic Places; it joined that list in 1966, the year the Register was established. Prior to that, it was designated a National Historic Landmark on July 19, 1964.

== History ==
In 1836, native Vermonter John Deere set out from Rutland, Vermont to Grand Detour, Illinois, founded by his friend and fellow Vermont native Leonard Andrus. The town lacked a local blacksmith, Deere's trade, and within two days Deere had a forge and new business established. In Vermont, Deere produced plows made from cast-iron and when he first arrived in Illinois he produced the same plows. Soil conditions in Illinois differ from those in Vermont. In Vermont the soil is sandy and falls easily away from the plow blade but in Illinois the soil is thicker and wetter; it stuck to the plow and had to be scraped off by the farmer as he plowed.

There are varying tales as to the inspiration for Deere to create the invention he is famed for, the steel plow. In one version he recalled the way the polished steel pitchfork tines moved through hay and soil and thought that the same effect could be obtained for a plow. Deere learned the technique polishing sewing needles for his mother, a seamstress. By early 1838, Deere completed his first steel plow and sold it to a local farmer, Lewis Crandall. Crandall spread word of his success with Deere's plow quickly, and two neighbors soon placed orders with Deere. By 1841 he was manufacturing 75 plows per year, and 100 plows per year in 1876.

== John Deere Historic Site ==
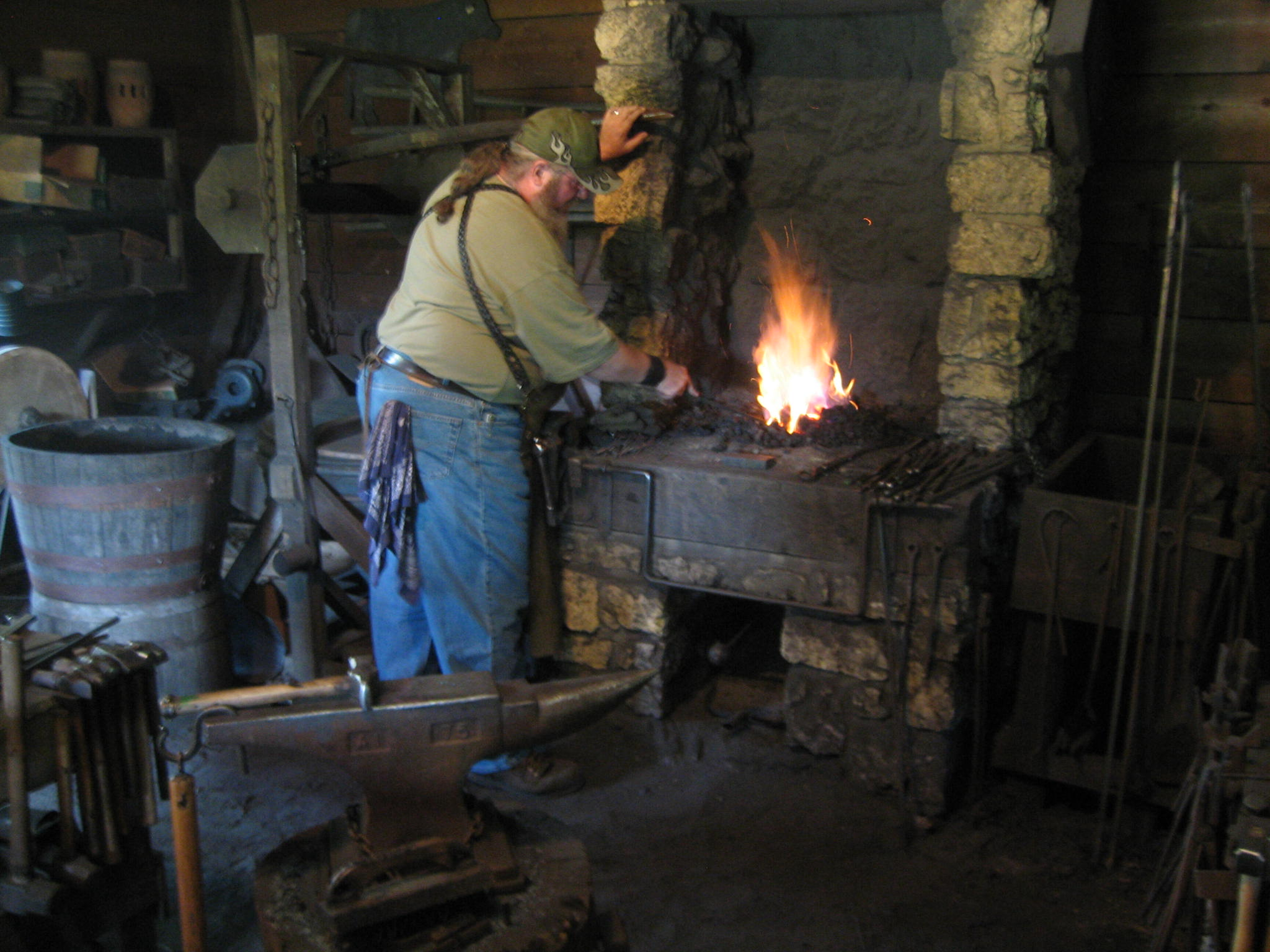
A modern-day blacksmith tends to the fire in the forge in the replica blacksmith shop.

The John Deere Historic Site in Grand Detour, Illinois is operated by the John Deere Company and has five components. Outside of the perimeter, which is surrounded by a white, wooden fence, are 2 acres (0.81 ha) of prairie restoration. Inside of the fenced area is the replica blacksmith shop, the John Deere House and the visitor center which is a gift shop. Also on the grounds is a building which houses the 1960s archaeological dig site. The blacksmith shop is a replica of the original Deere Shop, unearthed during the 1960s dig. The shop recreates Deere's shop and includes a demonstration by a modern blacksmith using antique tools of the trade and an open furnace. The visitor center is inside an 1843 home built by a Deere neighbor, it houses a gift shop which has an original Deere family wall clock on display. The home was originally owned by William Dana. The house is furnished with period items as well as the gift shop's merchandise. The entire site is operated by John Deere Company employees.

Part of the John Deere Historic Site is listed on the National Register of Historic Places along with being designated a National Historic Landmark. The only contributing property on the National Register listing for the site is the John Deere House. The house is also the only "property type" listed on the National Historic Landmarks' online database entry for the site. The house obtained National Historic Landmark status on July 19, 1964, and was added to the National Register of Historic Places soon after its inception on October 15, 1966.

== House ==
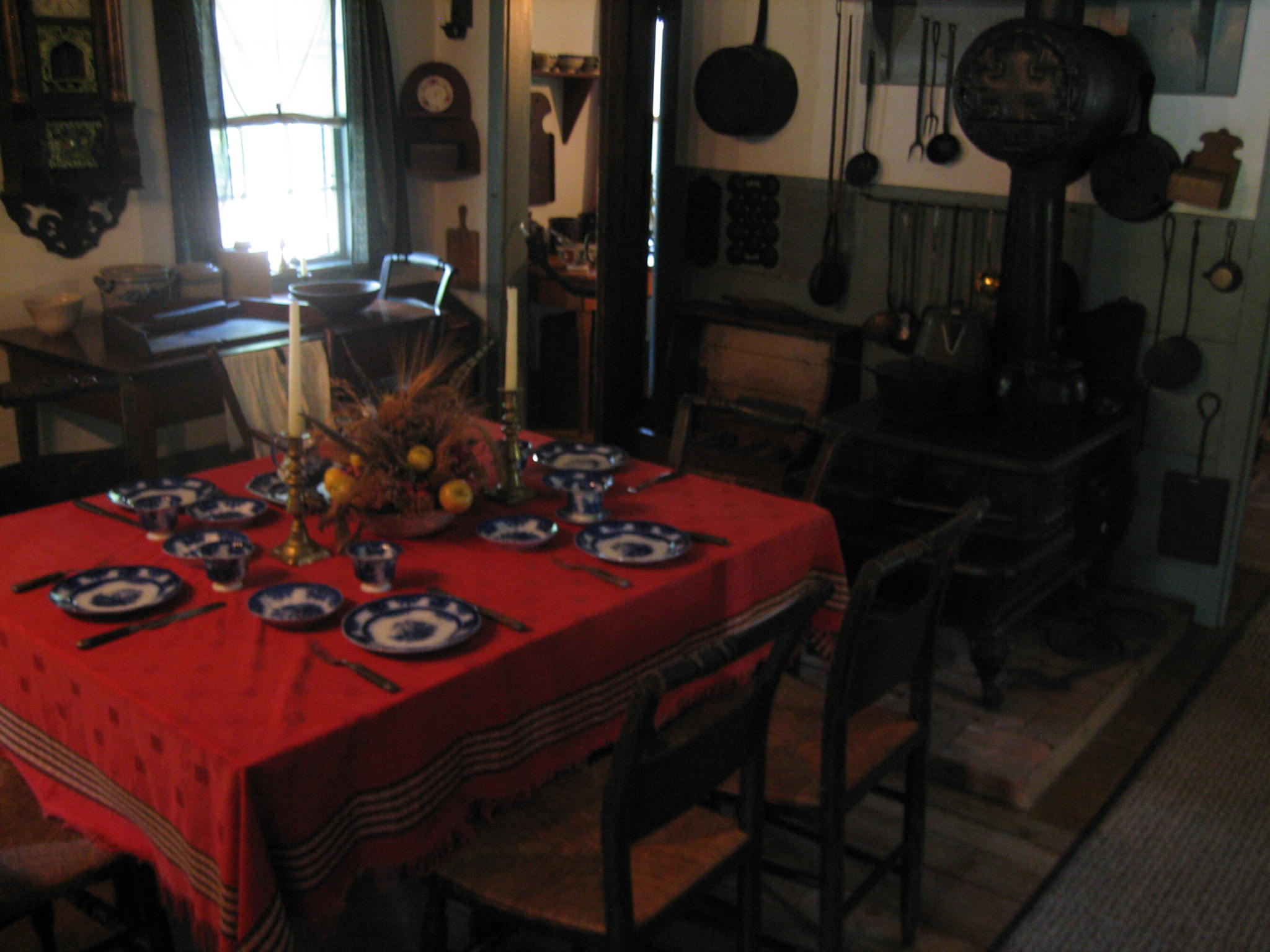
The period decorated kitchen and dining room were part of the first addition to the home.

The John Deere House was built in 1836 when Deere arrived in Grand Detour and the building was added onto as his family grew. It is furnished with period furniture and household objects that would have been common around the time the Deere family occupied the home. The house has two levels with four rooms on the main level and two rooms upstairs. Each of the upstairs rooms is accessible via a private staircase and it is believed one of the rooms was used by Deere's apprentices while the other was used as a children's bedroom.

The front entry leads into the living room where polished wood is found throughout as well as 19th century furnishings. The front room is part of the original building which consisted of one room. The room acted as the Deere's kitchen, living room, bedrooms, essentially everything. Deere eventually added onto the house, including a bedroom and an upstairs loft. The first floor bedroom would have been used for John and his wife, and possibly a couple of the children while the upstairs room would was used for the rest of the children. The Deeres left the home in 1847 when they moved to Moline, Illinois.

== Shop ==
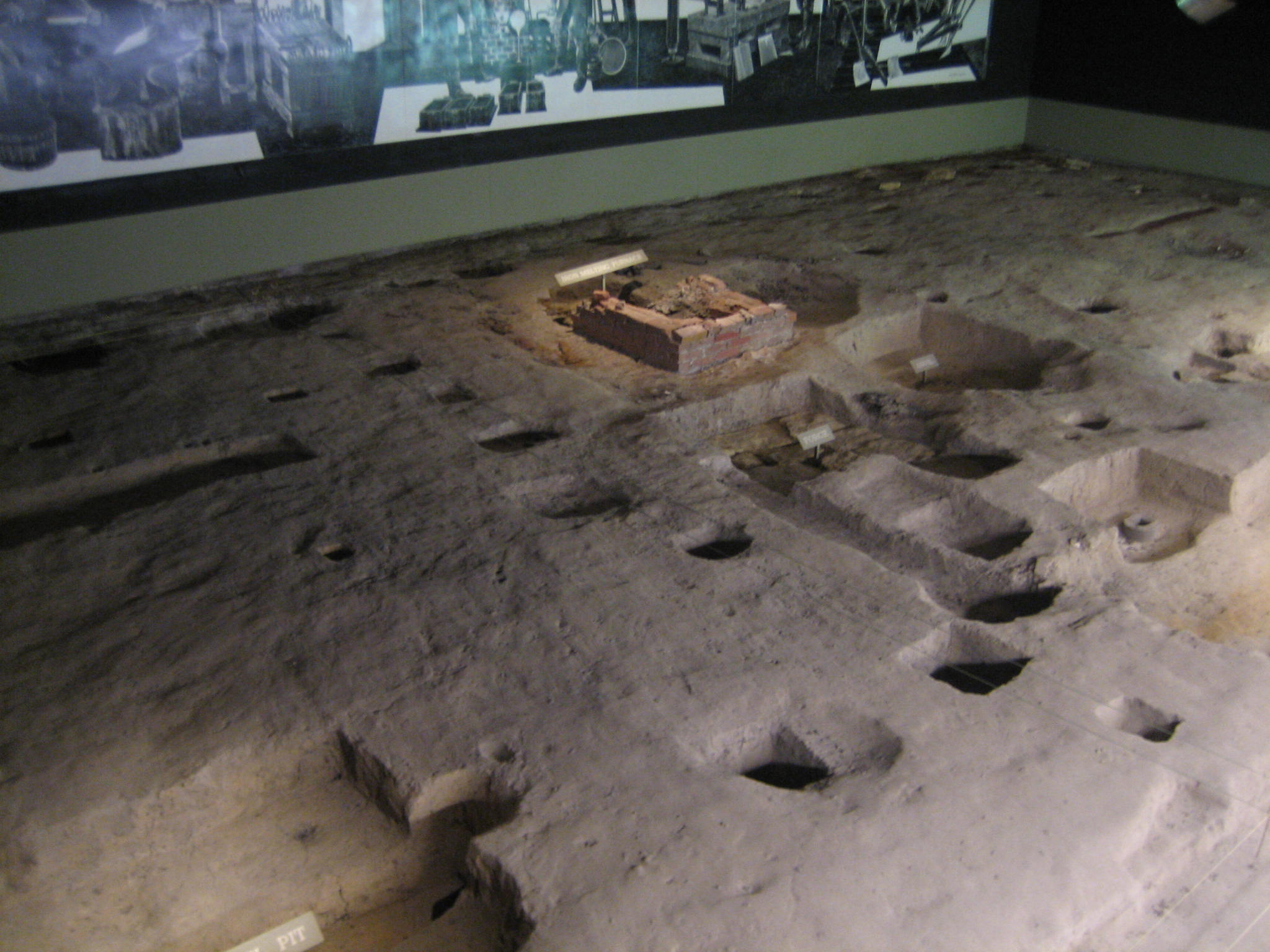
The preserved archaeological dig site.

The original blacksmith shop on the site is long gone, however, in 1962 an archaeological team made of students from the University of Illinois approached the Deere Company about excavating the site where the shop once stood. The team unearthed the location of the original Deere Blacksmith Shop where the first successful steel plow was developed in 1837. The dig site is preserved beneath a building, known as the pavilion. The site is surrounded by museum exhibits which include artifacts, news clippings, and photographs.

A blacksmith shop does occupy the current John Deere Historic Site grounds. Archaeologists used a magnetometer to locate the position of the forge in the original blacksmith shop, thus, the current shop shares an interior which is an exact replica of the original. The exterior of the building has the same dimensions as the original as well.

== Historic significance ==
The John Deere House and Shop is historically significant for its influence in the areas of commerce, agriculture, industry, and invention. The site was designated a U.S. National Historic Landmark on July 19, 1964. The Landmark designation was assigned by the U.S. Department of Interior because of the House and Shop's association with John Deere, founder of the John Deere Company and inventor of the first steel plow. His invention was of significance to the entire United States and made large scale cultivation of areas in Illinois, Indiana and Ohio possible. When the U.S. National Register of Historic Places was established in 1966 the John Deere House and Shop was among the first properties to join that list. It was added to the National Register on October 15, 1966, the same day the National Register was established.
