= Dixon High School (Illinois) =

High school in Illinois, United States

Coordinates: 41.847°N 89.4885°W

Location
- 300 Lincoln Statue Drive; Dixon, (Lee County), Illinois 61021; United States

Information
- Type: Public high school
- Principal: Jared Shaner
- Staff: 41.34 (FTE)
- Enrollment: 755 (2023-2024)
- Student to teacher ratio: 18.26
- Colors: Purple and white
- Nickname: Dukes/Duchesses
- Website: dhs.dps170.org/o/dhs

Dixon High School (DHS) is a high school located on Lincoln Statue Drive and Peoria Avenue on the northern side of Dixon, Illinois. It is a part of the Dixon Unit School District 170.

In addition to Dixon, the district includes Nachusa, Grand Detour, and the vast majority of Lost Nation.

== Notable alumni ==
- Charles Rudolph Walgreen (c. 1889), founder of Walgreens
- Louella Parsons (1901), first Hollywood gossip columnist
- Douglas MacLean (c. 1906), silent film actor, producer, and writer
- Ronald Reagan (1928), 40th president of the United States
- Lou Bevil (1939), former MLB player (Washington Senators)
- Rondi Reed (1970), Tony Award-winning actress
- Rita Crundwell (1971), criminal convicted of the largest municipal embezzlement in U.S. history
- Isaiah Roby (2016), basketball player for NBA's OKC Thunder
