= Lost Nation, Illinois =

Coordinates: 41°54′40″N 89°22′00″W

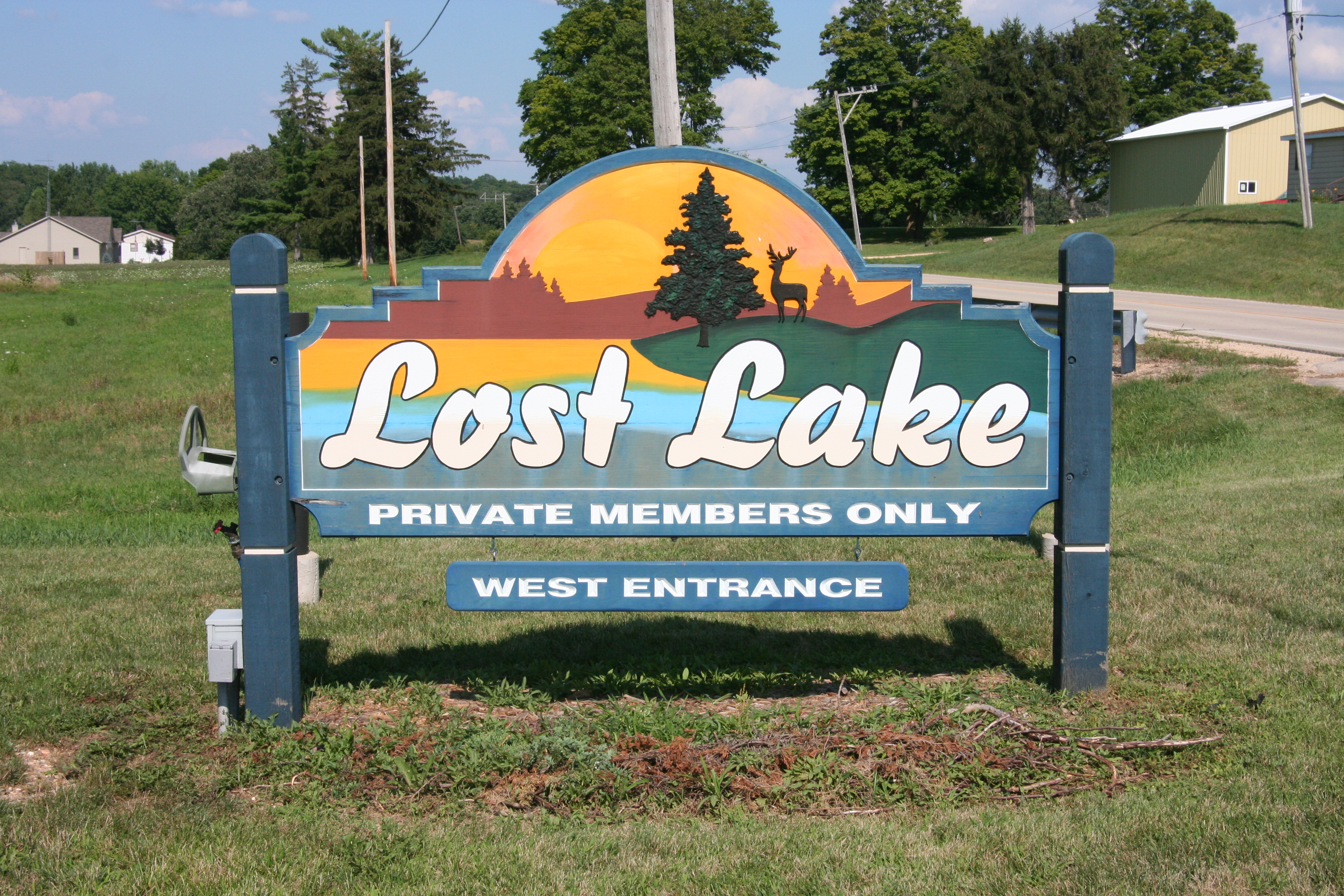
Sign for Lost Lake that leads into Lost Nation, Illinois, US

Lost Nation, Illinois is an unincorporated community and census-designated place (CDP) in Ogle County, Illinois, United States. It is located south of the city of Oregon. As of the 2020 census, Lost Nation had a population of 714. Lost Nation has an area of 2.552 square miles (6.61 km^{2}); 2.441 square miles (6.32 km^{2}) of this is land, and 0.111 square miles (0.29 km^{2}) is water.

Lost Nation has a golf course called "Lost Nation Golf Course".

== Demographics ==
Historical population
| Census | Pop. | Note | %± |
|---|---|---|---|
| 2010 | 708 | | — |
| 2020 | 714 | | 0.8% |
U.S. Decennial Census

Lost Nation CDP, Illinois – Racial and ethnic composition Note: the US Census treats Hispanic/Latino as an ethnic category. This table excludes Latinos from the racial categories and assigns them to a separate category. Hispanics/Latinos may be of any race.
| Race / Ethnicity (NH = Non-Hispanic) | Pop 2010 | Pop 2020 | % 2010 | % 2020 |
|---|---|---|---|---|
| White alone (NH) | 683 | 670 | 96.47% | 93.84% |
| Black or African American alone (NH) | 3 | 2 | 0.42% | 0.28% |
| Native American or Alaska Native alone (NH) | 4 | 0 | 0.56% | 0.00% |
| Asian alone (NH) | 0 | 4 | 0.00% | 0.56% |
| Pacific Islander alone (NH) | 0 | 0 | 0.00% | 0.00% |
| Other race alone (NH) | 0 | 4 | 0.00% | 0.56% |
| Mixed race or Multiracial (NH) | 5 | 14 | 0.71% | 1.96% |
| Hispanic or Latino (any race) | 13 | 20 | 1.84% | 2.80% |
| Total | 708 | 714 | 100.00% | 100.00% |

== Education ==
The vast majority of it is in the Dixon Unit School District 170. A portion is in the Ashton Community Unit School District 275. The former part is zoned to Dixon High School.
