= 1975 Omaha tornado outbreak =

37-tornado outbreak in 1975

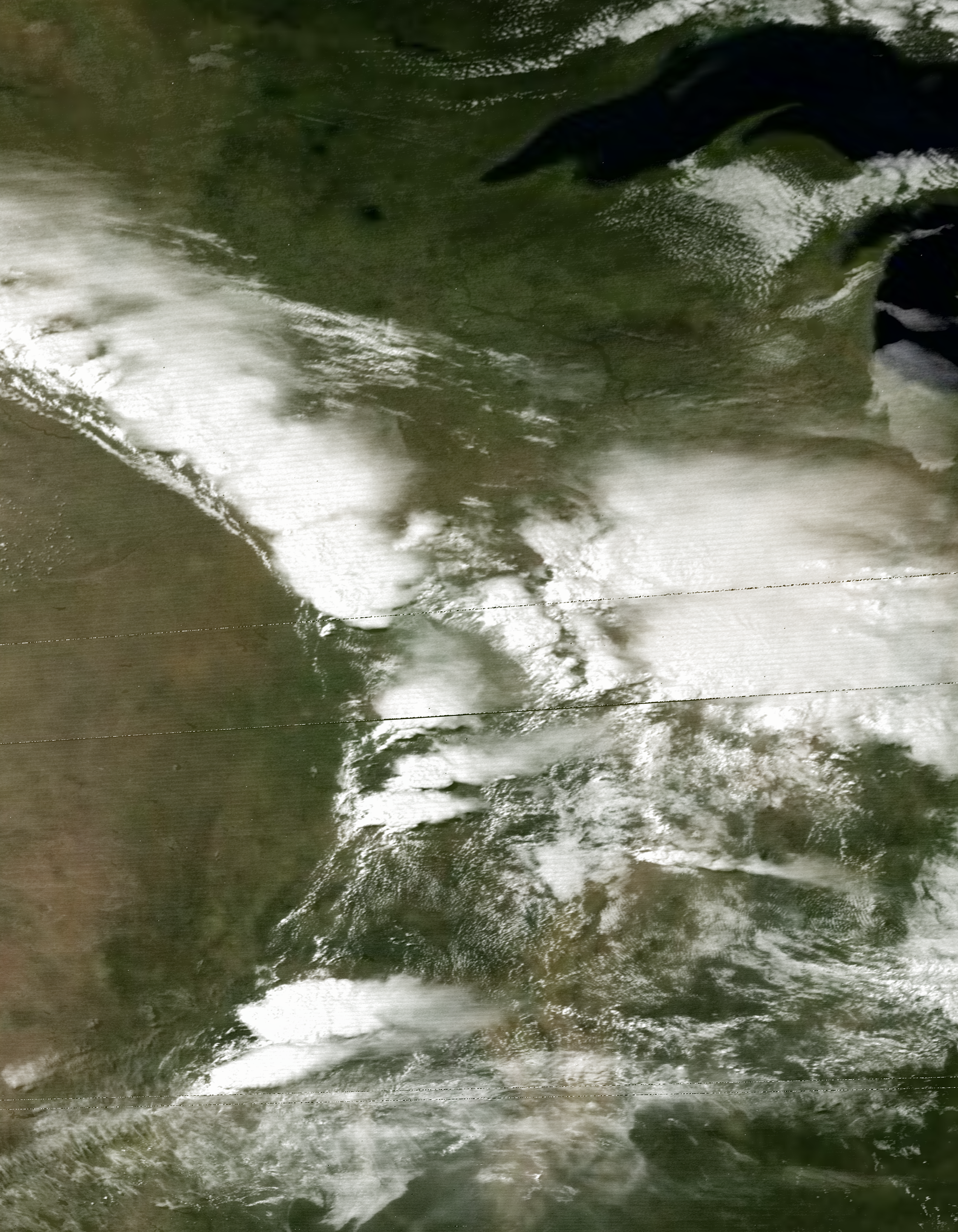
- Satellite imagery of the event unfolding over the U.S. Midwest on the afternoon of May 6

Meteorological history
- Duration: 35 hours

Tornado outbreak
- Tornadoes: 37
- Max. rating: F4 tornado

Overall effects
- Fatalities: 3
- Injuries: ≥149
- Damage: ≳$15 million (1975 USD)
- Areas affected: Upper Midwest (Iowa, Nebraska, South Dakota), Louisiana, Mississippi, Texas
- Part of the Tornadoes of 1975

During the afternoon of May 6, 1975, at least 12 tornadoes touched down in the Upper Midwest. The costliest of these tornadoes struck parts of western Omaha, Nebraska, causing at least $150 million in damage and killing three people. It was at the time the costliest tornado in U.S. history, damaging over a thousand homes across a nearly 2,000-block area on its roughly 15 mi (24 km) long path. The tornado's damage was later rated F4 on the Fujita scale. Another F4 tornado struck Magnet, Nebraska, destroying or damaging nearly every building in the town. The tornadoes were produced by thunderstorms moving across a narrow region of warm and moist air that had advanced northwards into the Upper Midwest as a result of a strong area of low pressure over South Dakota. Additional tornadoes on May 7 and May 8, including several in Louisiana, Texas, and Mississippi, were associated with the same storm system.

== Meteorological synopsis ==
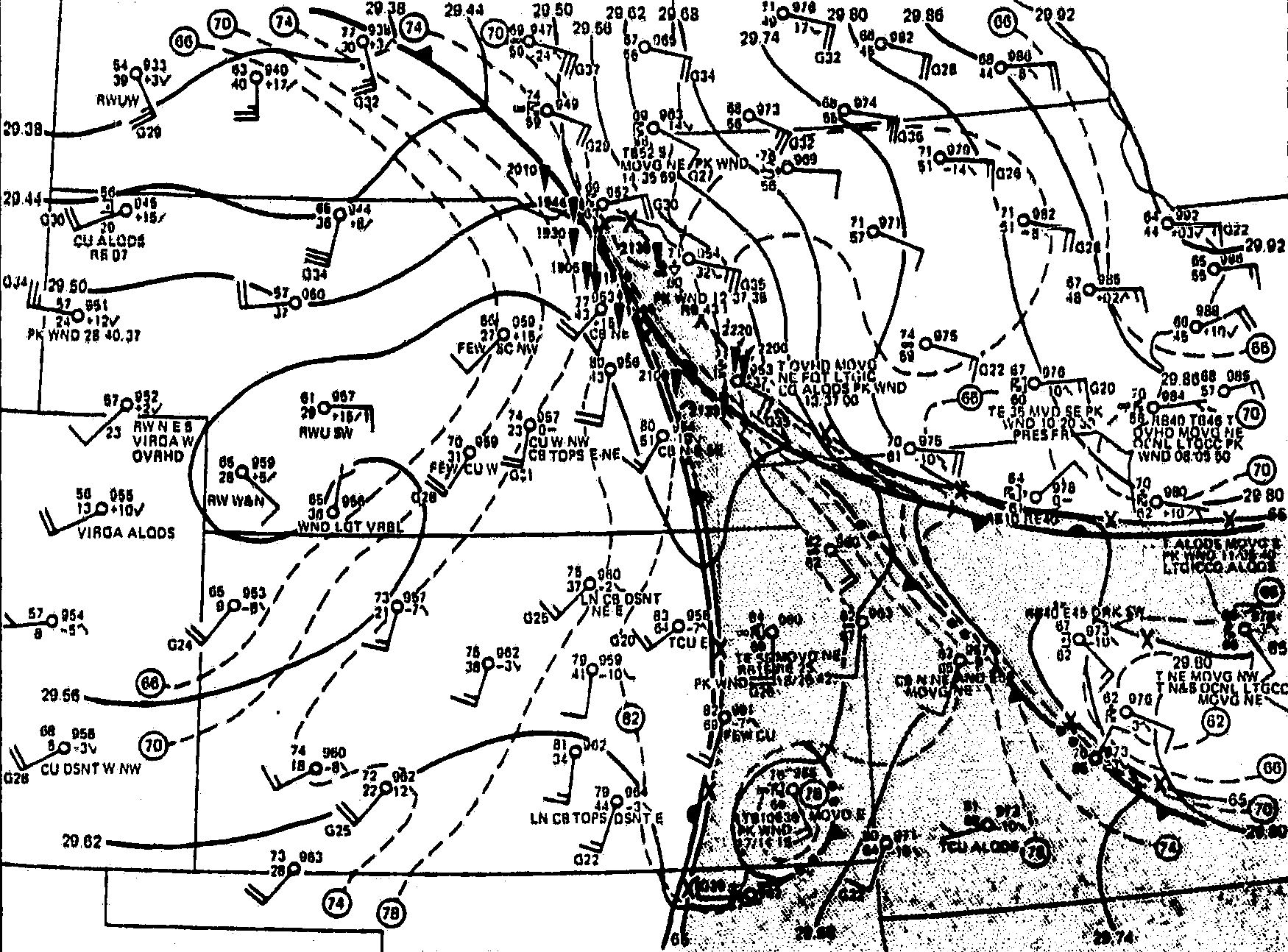
Surface weather analysis of the tornado outbreak region, with weather boundaries and weather observations at around 4 p.m. CDT May 6, including the eventual starting points of tornadoes

The tornado outbreak was associated with an intense area of low pressure that moved from Colorado into South Dakota beneath a strong upper-tropospheric trough. The combination of the low-pressure system and a ridge of high pressure over the Great Lakes moved unstable air in the lower levels of the troposphere towards eastern Nebraska. At 7 a.m. CDT on May 6, (Note: All times are in Central Daylight Time unless otherwise noted.) the area of low pressure was centered over southwestern South Dakota, with a central air pressure of 991 mbar (hPa; 29.26 inHg). A cold front extended from the low-pressure system southwestward to central Kansas, demarcating the boundary between a moist and warmer airmass to the east and a dry and cooler airmass to the west. Ahead of the cold front over eastern Kansas and Nebraska, dew points were near 65 °F (18 °C) while they were below 20 °F (−7 °C) behind the cold front over western Kansas. An ongoing scientific field campaign run by NASA – Atmospheric Variability Experiments – sampled environmental conditions throughout the southwestern and southern United States during the eventual severe weather event. A weather balloon launched from Omaha, Nebraska, at 7 a.m. sampled atmospheric conditions moderately conducive to severe weather. During the morning hours, the broader wind pattern brought increasingly moist air in the lower troposphere into a narrow region encompassing eastern Nebraska, eastern Kansas, and northern Missouri. This corridor of moist air was bounded to the west by the cold front and to the east by a warm front, each slowly moving. Warmer and drier air persisted in the mid-levels of the troposphere above this moist air, resulting in conditions potentially favorable for the development of storms. Daytime heating and the increase in moisture with time within this narrow region, as well as a simultaneous divergence of air in the upper-troposphere, further increased atmospheric instability, producing increasingly favorable conditions for storm formation. Ahead of the warm front, thunderstorms and cloud cover over southern Iowa and northern and central Missouri caused cooler conditions ahead of the warm front, reinforcing a strong temperature gradient across the front. This further enhanced the favorability of atmospheric conditions for storm development.

The National Severe Storms Forecast Center (NSSFC) issued a tornado watch for much of the area in advance of the event at 12:37 p.m. May 6. The watch area was in effect from 2–8 p.m. and encompassed parts of eastern Nebraska, northeastern Kansas, northwestern Missouri, western Iowa, southeastern South Dakota, and southwestern Minnesota; Omaha was also included within the watch area. The first indications of storm development were apparent in South Dakota by 11 a.m. A squall line soon developed along much of the cold front, with the strongest thunderstorms occurring near the intersection between the cold and warm fronts ahead of the low-pressure area and along the warm front, including the storm that eventually produced a destructive tornado in Omaha. Within this area, vorticity and convergence of winds near the surface were higher than surrounding areas. The squall line was first apparent on weather radar at around 1 p.m., extending from central South Dakota to central Oklahoma. At around 1:15 p.m., the National Weather Service office in Omaha received a report of hail from Creighton, the office's first of the day. Between around 2–7 p.m., the squall line produced several damaging tornadoes in northeastern Nebraska. In the Omaha area, the development of thunderstorms was preceded by the movement of a comma-shaped area of cloudiness into the region, an indication of the movement of vorticity in the mid- to upper-troposphere into the region. Many of the thunderstorms that produced tornadoes showed rapid growth on satellite imagery around the time of tornado development, indicative of the rapid rise of air. The thunderstorms were supported by the channel of moist air, tracking north before eventually weakening after moving into cooler and drier air downwind. Twelve tornadoes ultimately occurred over the north-central Great Plains on May 6, with large and strong tornadoes affecting eastern Nebraska. All but one of the tornadoes had relatively short tracks, with their parent thunderstorms moving across the narrow corridor of moist air and the steep temperature gradient accompanying the warm front; the storm that produced the long-track tornado moved parallel to the temperature gradient. The same weather system led to at least 19 tornadoes on May 7, including 10 in South Dakota and Iowa.

== Confirmed tornadoes ==
Confirmed tornadoes by Fujita rating
FU	F0	F1	F2	F3	F4	F5	Total
0	8	8	17	1	2	0	37

- Note: One tornado is confirmed, but its rating is unknown

Color/symbol key
Color / symbol	Description
†	Data from Thomas Grazulis
※	Data from the 1975 Storm Data publication
‡	Data from the NCEI database

=== May 6 event ===
List of confirmed tornadoes – Tuesday, May 6, 1975 (Note: All dates are based on the local time zone where the tornado touched down; however, all times are in Coordinated Universal Time for consistency.)
F#	Location	County / Parish	State	Start Coord.	Time (UTC)	Path length	Max width
F2	Near Ola to S of Chamberlain	Brule	SD	43.63°N 99.08°W	17:00–?※	12 mi (19 km)	50 yd (46 m)
F2	Numerous farm buildings were destroyed across four farms, and five cattle were killed. The NCEI lists this tornado at F0 intensity, but it is assessed at F2 strength by Grazulis.						
F4	E of Pierce to N of Magnet	Pierce, Cedar	NE	42.20°N 97.57°W	19:05–?	19 mi (31 km)	300 yd (270 m)
F4	A violent tornado moved through Magnet on a southeasterly to northwesterly heading at around 2:15 p.m. CDT, damaging or destroying nearly every structure in town. The Magnet city hall was destroyed. Some homes were completely leveled. Cattle were killed, cars were thrown over 200 yd (180 m), and power lines were toppled. One person was injured. Meteorologist Ted Fujita, who later photographed cycloidal scar patterns left by the tornado in cornfields in Cedar and Pierce counties, estimated that the tornado that struck Magnet was stronger the Omaha tornado.						
F2	SW of Pierce, NE to SW of Yankton, SD	Pierce, Knox, Cedar	NE	42.17°N 97.47°W	19:15–?†	43 mi (69 km)†	90 yd (82 m)
F2	A strong tornado caused damage intermittently along its path, especially in western Pierce where homes were damaged, barns were destroyed, cars were tossed, power lines were toppled, and livestock were killed. The NCEI lists this tornado at F3 intensity, but it is assessed at F2 strength by Grazulis.						
F0	W of Bloomfield	Knox	NE	42.52°N 97.77°W	19:30–?	5.4 mi (8.7 km)‡	30 yd (27 m)
F0	Farm buildings, irrigation equipment, and trees were sporadically damaged.						
F3	SE of Stanton to NE of Carroll	Stanton, Wayne	NE	41.97°N 97.20°W	19:45–?†	25 mi (40 km)†	150 yd (140 m)
F3	An intense tornado caused extensive damage to farms and power lines. Multiple barns were leveled, and one home was reduced to two standing walls. Five hundred chickens were killed. One person was injured.						
F2	SE of Tyndall to NW of Scotland†	Bon Homme, Hutchinson†	SD	42.93°N 97.75°W	19:46–?	20 mi (32 km)†	80 yd (73 m)†
F2	Small farm buildings were damaged. The Storm Data publication and the NCEI consider this event as two separate tornadoes focused in Bon Homme County. However, they are considered one event by Grazulis, and the path was extended into Hutchinson County. Additionally, the NCEI lists this tornado at F1 intensity, but it is assessed at F2 strength by Grazulis.						
F0	W of Scotland	Bon Homme	SD	43.15°N 98.07°W	20:10–?	5.4 mi (8.7 km)	33 yd (30 m)
F0	Small farm buildings were damaged.						
F0	E of Colon	Saunders	NE	41.28°N 96.58°W	21:00–?	3.4 mi (5.5 km)	17 yd (16 m)
F0	A brief tornado caused damage to trees and farm buildings on two farms.						
F0	SW of Waterbury	Dixon	NE	42.43°N 96.75°W	21:30–?	3 mi (4.8 km)	80 yd (73 m)
F0	Trees, power lines, and farm buildings were damaged.						
F4	Omaha	Sarpy, Douglas	NE	41.17°N 96.07°W	21:33–21:50※	10 mi (16 km)	250 yd (230 m)
F4	3 deaths – See the section on this tornado						
F2	NE of Crescent to E of Beebeetown	Pottawattamie, Harrison	IA	41.40°N 95.85°W	22:00–22:30※	11 mi (18 km)	500 yd (460 m)
F2	Numerous farm houses and outbuildings were damaged or destroyed. An aluminum silo was lofted 0.75 mi (1.21 km) away from a farmstead southwest of Beebeetown, Iowa. This tornado is not listed in Thomas Grazulis' Significant Tornadoes book.						
F2	N of Honey Creek to S of Logan	Pottawattamie, Harrison	IA	41.47°N 95.87°W	22:20–22:45※	13 mi (21 km)	—N/a
F2	Numerous farm houses and outbuildings were damaged or destroyed over intermittent stretches of a tornado's path. This tornado is not listed in Thomas Grazulis' Significant Tornadoes book.						

=== May 7 event ===
List of confirmed tornadoes – Wednesday, May 7, 1975
F#	Location	County / Parish	State	Start Coord.	Time (UTC)	Path length	Max width
F2	S of Pioneer	West Carroll	LA	32.67°N 91.47°W	06:05–?	5.6 mi (9.0 km)	—N/a
F2	A manufactured home was destroyed, and the occupant was severely injured after being tossed across the road. Portions of the home were scattered for 3 mi (4.8 km). Another house lost its roof and had its furniture tossed. The occupants were trapped and injured by a fallen tree.						
F1	N of Natchez	Adams	MS	31.62°N 91.40°W	11:45–?	0.25 mi (0.40 km)	60 yd (55 m)
F1	A farm co-op building had one of its sides knocked down and its roof ripped off and subsequently wrapped around a utility pole. A concession stand was destroyed, a warehouse was damaged, and several tree tops were twisted.						
F1	E of Midland	Jones	SD	44.07°N 100.90°W	16:55–?	—N/a	—N/a
F1	A brief tornado caused some property damage.						
F1	Hattiesburg	Forrest	MS	31.32°N 89.32°W	17:10–?	0.25 mi (0.40 km)	18 yd (16 m)
F1	Several pavilion shelters in Kemper Park were blown down. Playground equipment was damaged, power lines were toppled, and trees were uprooted. Some tree limbs fell onto a car.						
F1	S of Richton	Perry	MS	31.32°N 89.00°W	17:50–?	9.7 mi (15.6 km)	440 yd (400 m)
F1	Trees were uprooted, some of which fell on a manufactured home and a car, injuring the occupant.						
F1	E of Wendte	Stanley	SD	44.25°N 100.60°W	18:00–?	—N/a	—N/a
F1	A brief tornado caused some property damage.						
F2	WSW of Eastabuchie to Providence	Forrest, Jones	MS	31.40°N 89.38°W	19:30–?	5.4 mi (8.7 km)	150 yd (140 m)
F2	Two houses lost their roofs while a third was heavily damaged. Two chicken houses were destroyed and trees were uprooted, some of which fell on homes or blocked roads.						
F0	N of Pierre	Sully	SD	44.70°N 100.40°W	19:55–?	—N/a	—N/a
F0	A brief tornado was reported to the sheriff's office.						
F0	NE of Pierre	Sully	SD	44.63°N 100.13°W	21:30–?	—N/a	—N/a
F0	A brief tornado was reported to the sheriff's office.						
F1	Leander	Williamson	TX	30.58°N 97.85°W	22:00–?	—N/a	—N/a
F1	An F1 tornado caused damage in Leander.						
F2	Nolanville	Bell	TX	31.08°N 97.62°W	22:00–23:00	—N/a	—N/a
F2	Four manufactured homes were demolished, one was overturned, and eleven others were damaged. Two people were injured. This tornado is not listed in Thomas Grazulis' Significant Tornadoes book.						
F0	NW of Pierre	Sully	SD	44.75°N 100.80°W	22:20–?	—N/a	—N/a
F0	A brief tornado was reported to the sheriff's office.						
F?	Burnet	Burnet	TX	—N/a	22:30–?	—N/a	—N/a
F?	Small buildings and sheds were blown down, and trees were uprooted. This tornado is listed in the Storm Data publication but not by the NCEI.						
F2	S of Dow City	Crawford	IA	41.82°N 95.50°W	23:30–?	—N/a	—N/a
F2	Grain bins, a brick silo, and a machine shed were destroyed. The roof was ripped off a feeding shed. A garage was overturned. A home lost shingles and windows. This tornado is not listed in Thomas Grazulis' Significant Tornadoes book.						
F2	E of Harlan to Irwin	Shelby	IA	41.65°N 95.22°W	00:00–?	12 mi (19 km)※	—N/a
F2	Some farm buildings, a barn, and a corn crib were destroyed. The roof of a home was damaged. This tornado is not listed in Thomas Grazulis' Significant Tornadoes book.						
F0	Creston	Union	IA	41.07°N 94.37°W	00:15–?	—N/a	—N/a
F0	A tornado touched down in an open field.						
F2	E of Grand River	Decatur	IA	40.82°N 93.83°W	01:00–?※	—N/a	—N/a
F2	Two hog houses and a barn were destroyed. Two hogs were killed. Trees were uprooted as well.						
F2	Osceola	Clarke	IA	41.03°N 93.78°W	01:30–?※	10 mi (16 km)	—N/a
F2	A strong tornado caused damage at six farms. A barn and a shed were destroyed. The roof and doors were ripped off a house, windows were blown out of a car, and two cows were killed.						

=== May 8 event ===
List of confirmed tornadoes – Thursday, May 8, 1975
F#	Location	County / Parish	State	Start Coord.	Time (UTC)	Path length	Max width
F2	S of Florien	Sabine	LA	31.33°N 93.67°W	04:00–?	—N/a	—N/a
F2	A tornado destroyed a home and then moved through forested areas. This tornado is not listed in Thomas Grazulis' Significant Tornadoes book.						
F2	Northeastern Welsh	Jefferson Davis	LA	30.23°N 92.82°W	06:05–?	1 mi (1.6 km)	100 yd (91 m)
F2	Six homes and four trailers were destroyed, including one trailer lofted to the tops of trees. Numerous trees were uprooted. Three people were injured.						
F1	Mansfield	DeSoto	LA	32.03°N 93.72°W	06:15–?	0.75 mi (1.21 km)	—N/a
F1	A brief tornado uprooted trees, one of which fell onto a home, injuring the occupant.						
F2	S of Estherwood	Acadia	LA	30.17°N 92.48°W	07:00–?	0.25 mi (0.40 km)	50 yd (46 m)
F2	A manufactured home was destroyed. A number of aircraft at a hangar were damaged at the Le Gros Airport. This tornado is not listed in Thomas Grazulis' Significant Tornadoes book.						
F1	Duson	Lafayette	LA	30.23°N 92.18°W	07:30–?	0.5 mi (0.80 km)	50 yd (46 m)
F1	An auto repair shop and several manufactured homes were damaged. Two people were injured.						
F2	Baton Rouge	East Baton Rouge	LA	30.42°N 91.18°W	07:30–?	6.2 mi (10.0 km)	50 yd (46 m)
F2	A tornado impacted the Louisiana State University campus, ripping the tops of elevator shafts and the top half of a nearby water tower. Numerous trees were snapped or twisted. This tornado is not listed in Thomas Grazulis' Significant Tornadoes book.						
F2	SW of Greensburg	St. Helena	LA	30.75°N 90.75°W	08:00–?	—N/a	—N/a
F2	Six electrical transmission towers were destroyed. This tornado is not listed in Thomas Grazulis' Significant Tornadoes book.						

=== Omaha, Nebraska ===
Omaha, Nebraska
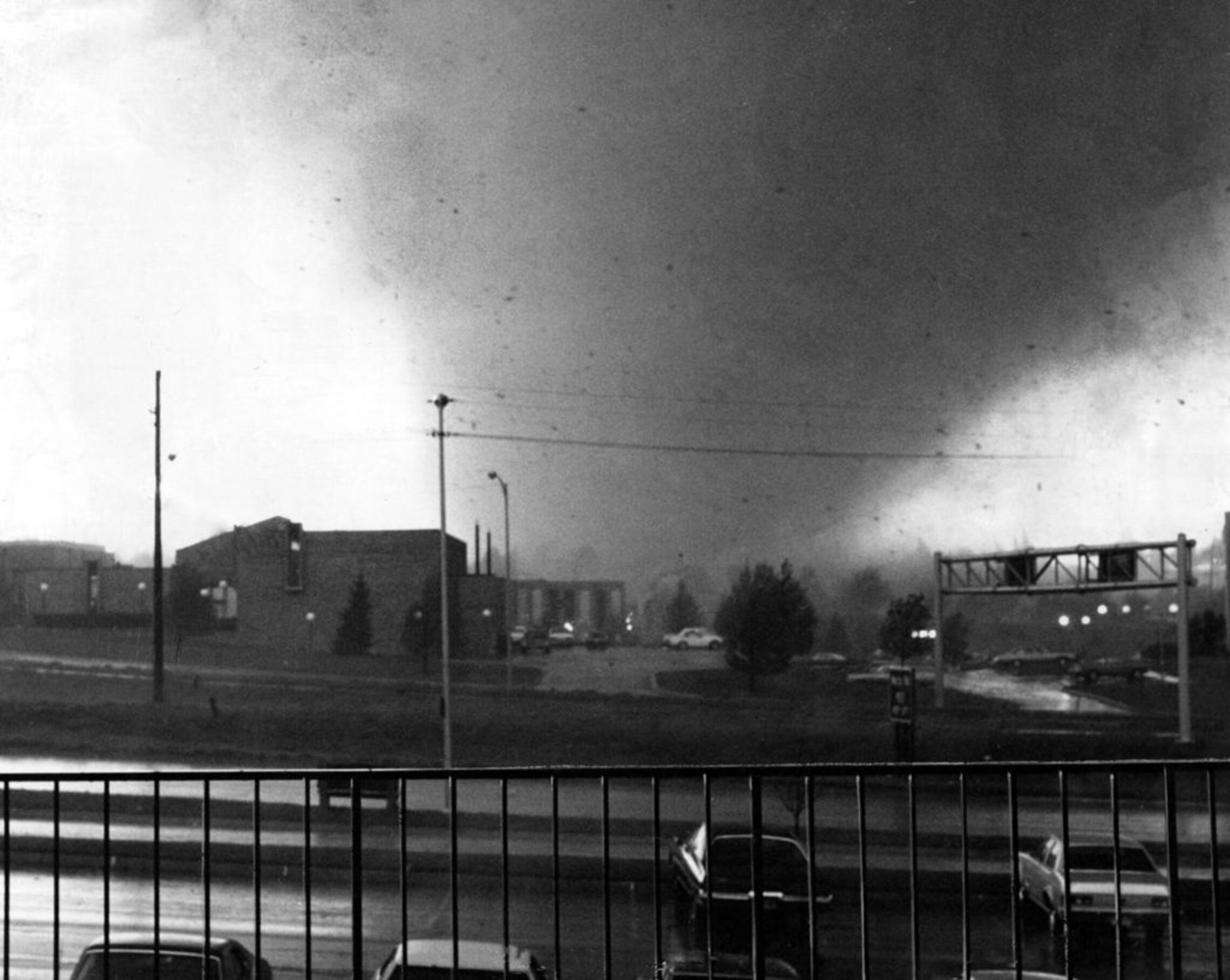
- The Tornado as seen from an office building.

Meteorological history
- Formed: May 6, 1975 c. 4:33 p.m. CDT (UTC−05:00)
- Dissipated: c. May 6, 1975 c. 4:50 p.m. CDT (UTC−05:00)
- Duration: 17–29 minutes (Note: Storm Data lists the tornado as having occurred between 4:33–4:50 p.m. However, reports from storm spotters and the National Weather Service Disaster Survey Report on the tornado indicate that the tornado lasted from about 4:29 p.m. to 4:58 p.m.)

F4 tornado
- on the Fujita scale
- Highest winds: 245 mph (394 km/h)

Overall effects
- Fatalities: 3
- Injuries: 141
- Damage: $150–200 million (1975 USD) $0.9–1.2 billion (2025 USD)
- Houses destroyed: 287

This large and destructive tornado – at the time the costliest in U.S. history – impacted residential areas of west-central Omaha on the afternoon of May 6, tracking primarily south to north along 72nd Street. During the afternoon and evening, a tornado watch was in effect for parts of eastern Nebraska. Tornadoes were reported near several Nebraska communities during the early afternoon. The National Weather Service forecast office in Omaha issued two severe thunderstorm warnings for Douglas County, Nebraska, including the Omaha area, during the afternoon of May 6. Teams of storm spotters associated with the National Weather Service and Offutt Air Force Base were deployed following the watch and warning issuances between around 1–2 p.m. At 4:09 p.m., a volunteer storm spotter reported an emerging funnel cloud northwest of Springfield, Nebraska. Tornado sirens were activated for Sarpy County, Nebraska, following the report. Additional reports of funnel clouds and the appearance of a hook echo on weather radar prompted the Omaha office to issue a pre-prepared tornado warning for Sarpy and eastern Douglas counties in Nebraska and western Pottawattamie County in Iowa at 4:14 p.m.

The first confirmations of a tornado touching down were reported at around 4:29 p.m., leading to the activation of tornado sirens in Omaha. The Storm Data publication for May 1975 indicates that the tornado touched down slightly later at around 4:33 p.m. This gave a nearly four hour leadtime between issuance of the tornado watch and tornado occurrence, and over an hour leadtime for the tornado warning. The tornado's path began in a largely rural area near the intersection of Nebraska Highway 370 and 132nd Street in northern Sarpy County. The first homes destroyed by the tornado were hit at around 4:35 p.m. Following initial reports of damage near the intersection of 96th and Q streets, Nebraska governor J. James Exon activated the Nebraska Army National Guard. Moving northeast, the tornado struck parts of northwestern Ralston, damaging neighborhoods and businesses near 84th and L streets. Large airborne debris was observed near 72nd and L streets. 2×4s were reported falling from the sky over Omaha ahead of the tornado. The Wentworth Apartments, the largest apartment complex in the Omaha area at the time, sustained severe damage with 70 percent of the complex's buildings destroyed. Parts of the roof of Ralston High School were peeled away by the tornado.

The tornado's path then curved north towards and over west-central sections of the city of Omaha, crossing Interstate 80 near 84th Street, inflicting injuries on the highway and prompting the highway's closure. Beginning to track along and near 72nd Street, the tornado cut across the Westgate subdivision, causing extensive damage and destroying Westgate Elementary School. Well-constructed homes were destroyed in the neighborhood. At 4:40 p.m., the tornado struck Bergan Mercy Hospital, blowing out windows and disheveling furniture; all 825 employees and patients of the hospital survived. Vehicles in the hospital parking lot were tossed and destroyed. Damage at the hospital amounted to around $5 million. The tornado narrowly avoided the Ak-Sar-Ben racetrack, forcing most of the 8,700 attendees at the racetrack that day into shelter. One person was killed while taking shelter at a restaurant at 78th and Pacific streets. Numerous buildings sustained significant damage near the intersection of 72nd and Dodge streets, including the Nebraska Furniture Mart. Most of the mail carrier fleet at a nearby U.S. post office was lost, with 80 of the office's 90 cars destroyed. Some of the most severe damage associated with the tornado occurred after it crossed Dodge Street at around 4:45 p.m., with buildings reduced to rubble. The Omaha Community Playhouse lost most of its roof and the Downtowner Motor Inn suffered major damage. Extensive damage occurred along 72nd Street, with numerous homes and apartments severely damaged, along with Creighton Prep School, Lewis and Clark Junior High school, the First United Methodist Church, and the Temple Israel Jewish Synagogue. Two people were killed near the intersection of 69th and Maple streets. A police officer who had been tasked with following the tornado and communicating live updates reported that the tornado lifted near Benson Park at around 4:58 p.m. Storm Data listed the tornado as dissipating after around 4:50 p.m.

Approximately 30,000 people may have been in the path of the tornado. Three people were killed by the tornado and another 141 people were injured; of the injuries, 25 were considered serious injuries. The tornado's path was approximately 15 mi (24 km) long, with about 6 mi (9.7 km) in Sarpy County and 9 mi (14 km) in Douglas County. A contiguous stretch of property damage occurred along a 8 mi (13 km) stretch. The swath of damage ranged from about 0.25–0.5 mi (0.40–0.80 km) wide, spanning two to six city blocks at a time. Across the roughly 2,000-block area impacted by the tornado, 287 homes were destroyed, 650 were heavily damaged, and 787 were moderately damaged; another 53 apartment buildings sustained damage. The damage rendered thousands of people homeless. The Nebraska governor's office estimated a damage toll of $150–200 million (1975 USD; equivalent to $0.9–1.2 billion in 2025), making the tornado the costliest tornado in U.S. history and the costliest natural disaster in Nebraska history at the time. Damage estimates ranged as high as $500 million (equivalent to $3 billion in 2025). Researcher Thomas P. Grazulis estimated that the tornado caused F4-rated damage on the Fujita scale.

Damage caused by the Omaha tornado

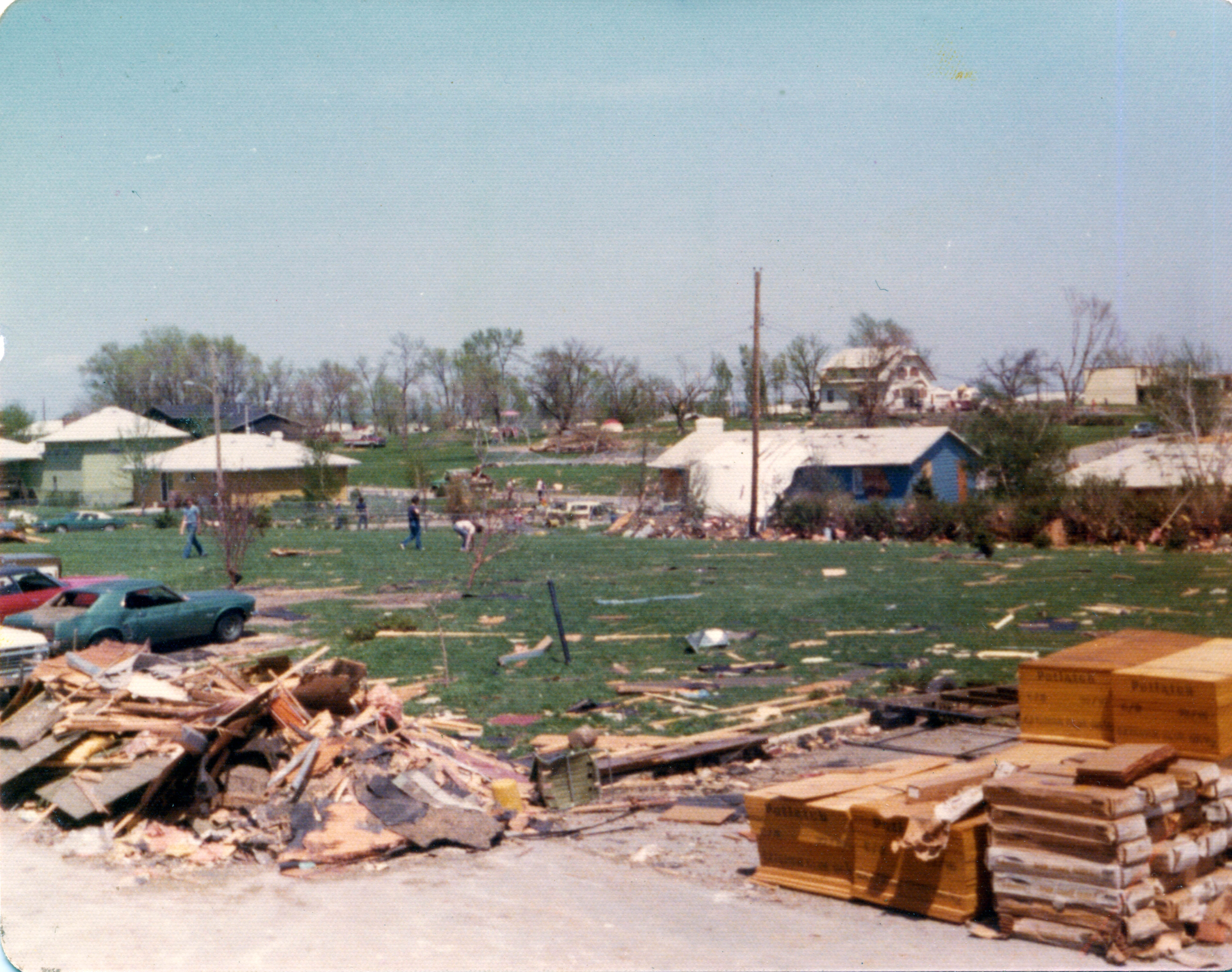
Ralston area near Bay Meadows Park

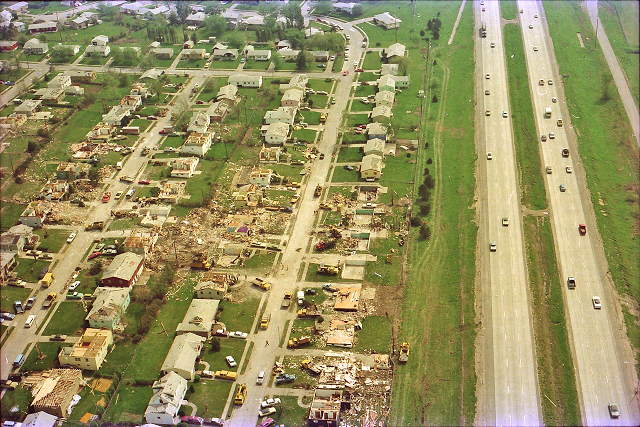
Westgate subdivision near Interstate 80

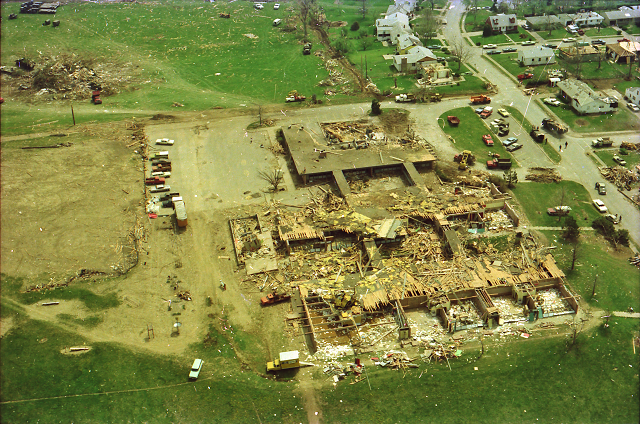
Westgate Elementary

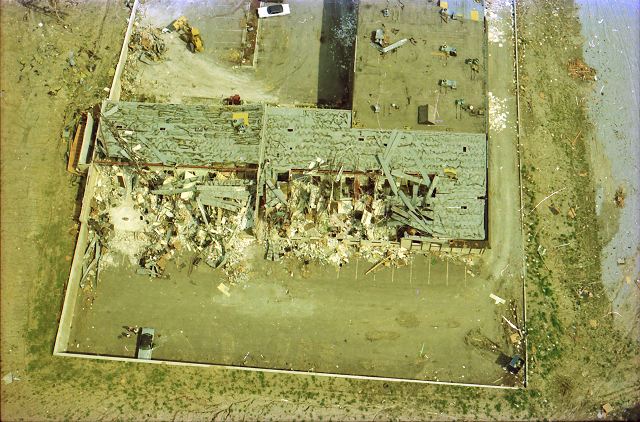
West Omaha Postal Station

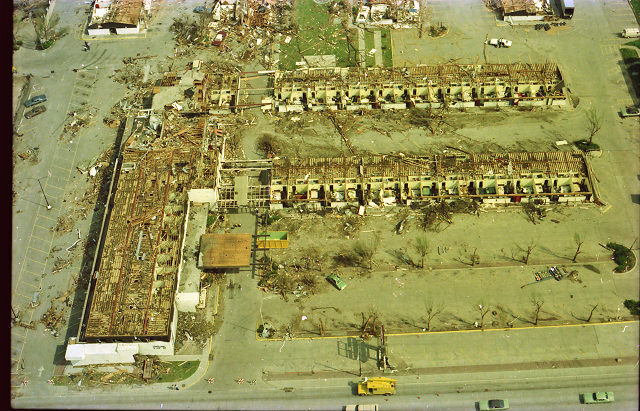
Downtowner Motor Inn (near 72nd and Dodge)

== See also ==
- List of North American tornadoes and tornado outbreaks
  - Tornado outbreak of April 26–28, 2024 – produced several significant tornadoes in the Omaha area
  - Tornado outbreak sequence of March 1913 – included a damaging and deadly tornado in Omaha

== Notes ==
Preceded by Lubbock, TX (1970)	Costliest U.S. tornadoes on Record; May 6, 1975	Succeeded by Wichita Falls, TX (1979)
