= Labrador Low =

A Labrador Low is a type of extratropical cyclone that forms off the coast of Labrador in eastern Canada. These lows typically move into the Labrador Sea and eventually into the North Atlantic Ocean off the coast of Iceland.

== See also ==
- Colorado low
- Gulf low
- Panhandle hook
- Aleutian Low
