= Gulf low =

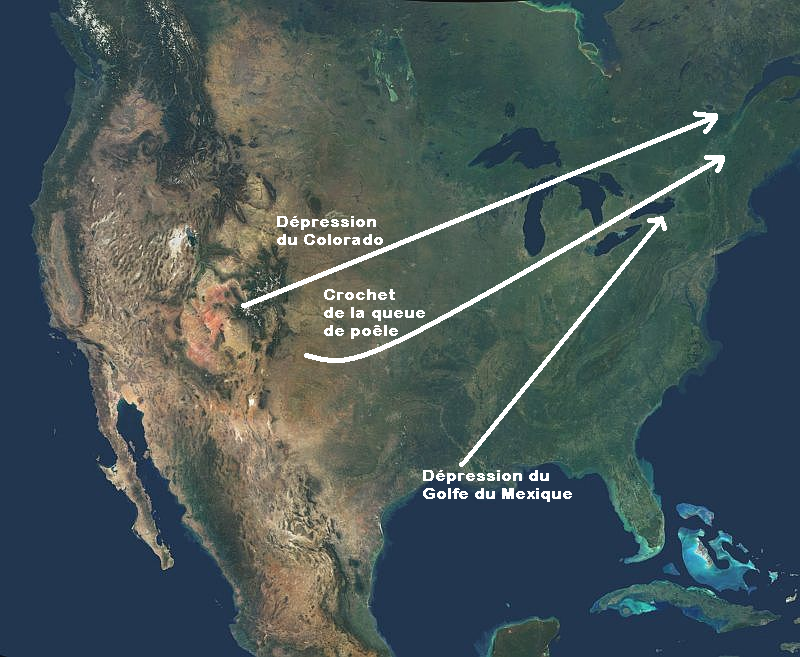
The trajectory of a Gulf low is the most southeastern one on the map.

A Gulf low or Texas Low is a low pressure area that forms or intensifies over the Gulf of Mexico and moves northeast on the western side of the Appalachian Mountains and sometimes on the Atlantic coast to become a nor'easter. Because they move from over or near the Gulf of Mexico, these storm systems are capable of transporting copious amounts of moisture with them. At their strongest, these storm systems are even more potent snowfall producers than panhandle hooks, primarily because of the mixing of Atlantic Ocean moisture into the storm system once they cross the Appalachian Mountains. Because of the general west to east movement of weather systems in the mid latitudes of the northern hemisphere, Gulf Lows rarely affect areas west of the Mississippi River. One such exception was the Halloween Blizzard of 1991.

== Types ==
There are two types of "Gulf Lows": West and East Gulf Cyclones or Types Ga and Gb. As western storms (Alberta clippers, North and South Pacific and Rocky Mountain) move eastward, a trailing frontal remnant is often left in the Gulf of Mexico or the adjacent coastal states. When the frontal trough from a new cyclone enters this area, cyclogenesis often occurs on the Gulf front. This newly formed Gulf wave that moves northeastward and dominates the weather over the eastern United States and Canada. One of the basic differences between the two types is that the Ga track is west of the Appalachians and the Gb track is east of the Appalachians.

=== Ga ===
The Ga type is characterized by an upper-level trough in the central and eastern part of the United States which steers the newly formed wave north and northeast over the western side of the Appalachians accompanied by widespread precipitation to the north. This type is most frequently observed in the winter and early spring.

=== Gb ===
The 1993 North American Storm Complex started out as a Gulf Low (East Gulf Low or Gb) before it eventually evolved into a nor'easter. It initially formed in the western Gulf of Mexico and moved towards Florida before turning to the north and becoming a nor'easter. Another large gulf low storm was the Great Blizzard of 1978, which brought one of the lowest non-tropical barometric pressures recorded in the United States.

== See also ==
- Alberta clipper
- Colorado low
- Nor'easter
- Panhandle hook
