= Colorado low =

North American low-pressure area

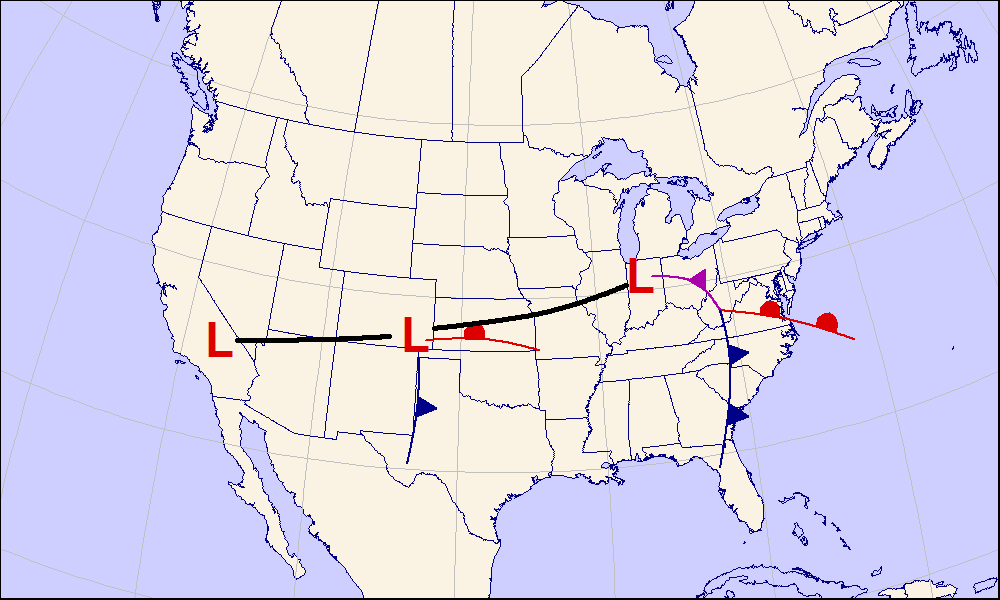
A typical path of a Colorado low

A Colorado low is a low-pressure area that forms in southeastern Colorado or northeastern New Mexico, typically in the winter. After forming, the system moves across the Great Plains. Colorado lows can produce heavy wintry precipitation, and have a general east to northeast movement, impacting regions as far north as Winnipeg and as far east as the Atlantic coast. If upper-level conditions are right, the jet stream can push the low farther south, bringing wintry precipitation as far as Texas. When pushed this far south, the system is often referred to as a "blue norther". On the more typical track, a Colorado low can be similar to an Alberta clipper. In the winter Colorado lows are responsible for a majority of the snow that the Midwest receives; however, summer systems can trigger long-lasting convective systems, including severe weather. Spring and early summer Colorado low cyclogenesis can result in significant tornado outbreaks over the Great Plains and Midwest.

== See also ==
- Denver Convergence Vorticity Zone (DCVZ)
- Gulf low
- Nor'easter
- Panhandle hook
