= List of Minnesota weather records =

The following is a list of Minnesota weather records observed at various stations across the state since the early 1800s. Minnesota is a state in the Upper Midwestern region of the United States. Due to its location in the northern plains of the United States its climate is one of extremes. Minnesota's history of nearly continuous meteorological record keeping stretches back two centuries to 1819 when Fort Snelling was settled. By 1871 the first official government observations were taking place in the Twin Cities and by the late 19th century and early 20th century most statewide stations that exist today were in operation.

== Temperature ==
=== Overall ===
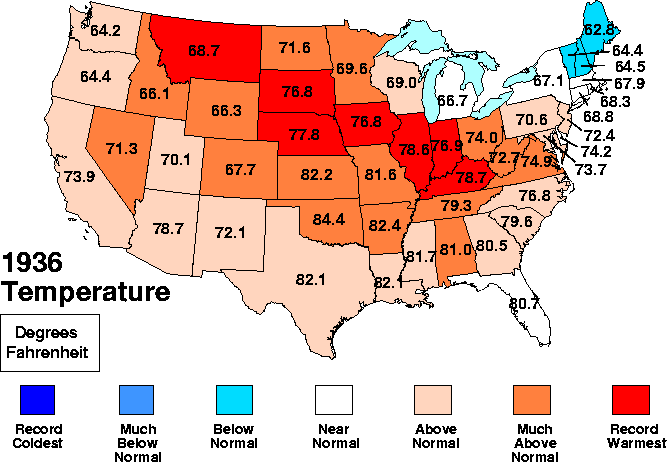
The 1936 North American heat wave caused record-setting temperatures in eight US states.

Event	Measurement	Date	Location
Highest Temperature	115 °F (46.1 °C)	July 29, 1917	Beardsley
Lowest Temperature	−60 °F (−51.1 °C)	February 2, 1996	Tower
Largest single-day change	72 °F (40 °C)	February 2, 1970	Nett Lake

=== By month ===
Climate data for Minnesota
Month	Jan	Feb	Mar	Apr	May	Jun	Jul	Aug	Sep	Oct	Nov	Dec	Year
Record high °F (°C)	69 (21)	76 (24)	88 (31)	101 (38)	112 (44)	110 (43)	115 (46)	110 (43)	111 (44)	99 (37)	84 (29)	74 (23)	115 (46)
Record low °F (°C)	−57 (−49)	−60 (−51)	−50 (−46)	−22 (−30)	0 (−18)	15 (−9)	24 (−4)	12 (−11)	10 (−12)	−16 (−27)	−47 (−44)	−57 (−49)	−60 (−51)

Event	Measurement	Date	Location
January
Highest Temperature	69 °F (20.6 °C)	January 24, 1981	Montevideo
Lowest Temperature	−57 °F (−49.4 °C)	January 20, 1996; January 24, 1904; January 20, 1996	Embarrass; Pokegama Dam; Tower
February
Highest Temperature	73 °F (22.8 °C)	February 26, 1896	Pleasant Mound
Lowest Temperature	−60 °F (−51.1 °C)	February 2, 1996	Tower
March
Highest Temperature	88 °F (31.1 °C)	March 23, 1910; March 21, 2026	Montevideo; Luverne
Lowest Temperature	−50 °F (−45.6 °C)	March 2, 1897	Pine City; Cohasset
April
Highest Temperature	101 °F (38.3 °C)	April 22, 1980	Hawley
Lowest Temperature	−22 °F (−30 °C)	April 6, 1979; April 6, 1982	Karlstad; Tower
May
Highest Temperature	112 °F (44.4 °C)	May 31, 1934	Maple Plain
Lowest Temperature	0 °F (−17.8 °C)	May 9, 1916	Grand Rapids
June
Highest Temperature	110 °F (43.3 °C)	June 29, 1931; June 24, 1988	Canby; Browns Valley
Lowest Temperature	15 °F (−9.4 °C)	June 1, 1964	Bigfork
July
Highest Temperature	115 °F (46.1 °C)	July 29, 1917	Beardsley
Lowest Temperature	24 °F (−4.4 °C)	July 7, 1997 and July 13, 2009	Tower and Kelliher
August
Highest Temperature	110 °F (43.3 °C)	August 10, 1947; August 1, 1988	Beardsley; Montevideo; Madison
Lowest Temperature	12 °F (−11.1 °C)	August 23, 1936	Tower
September
Highest Temperature	111 °F (43.9 °C)	September 11, 1931	Beardsley
Lowest Temperature	10 °F (−12.2 °C)	September 30, 1930; September 22, 1974	Big Falls; Thorhult
October
Highest Temperature	99 °F (37.2 °C)	October 2, 1922	Ada
Lowest Temperature	−16 °F (−26.7 °C)	October 26, 1936	Roseau
November
Highest Temperature	84 °F (28.9 °C)	November 1, 1950; November 4, 2020	Winona; Granite Falls
Lowest Temperature	−47 °F (−43.9 °C)	November 25, 1945	Pine City
December
Highest Temperature	74 °F (23.3 °C)	December 9, 1939	Wheaton
Lowest Temperature	−57 °F (−49.4 °C)	December 31, 1898	Pine City

== Precipitation ==
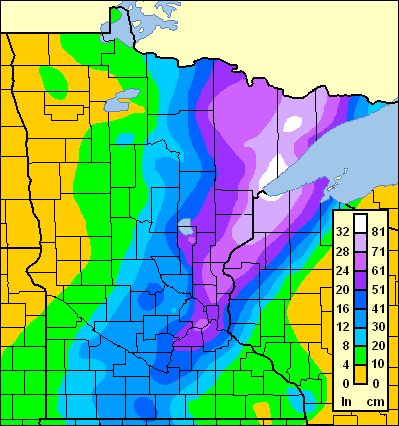
Map of Minnesota showing the snowfall totals from the 1991 Halloween Blizzard.

Event	Measurement	Date	Location
Most yearly precip (one location)	60.21 inches (1,529 mm)	2018	Harmony
Least yearly precip (one location)	6.37 inches (162 mm)	1976	Ortonville
Most yearly precip (State average)	33.92 inches (862 mm)	1977	Statewide
Longest dry spell	79 days	November 9, 1943 - January 26, 1944	Beardsley, Canby, Marshall, Dawson

=== Rain ===
Event	Measurement	Date	Location
Most rain in 24 hours	15.10 inches (384 mm)	August 18–19, 2007	Hokah
Most rain in one month	23.86 inches (606 mm)	August 2007	Hokah

=== Snow ===
Event	Measurement	Date	Location
Earliest recorded snow	Trace	August 31, 1949	Duluth
Earliest measurable snow	0.3 inch (1 cm)	September 14, 1964	International Falls
Latest recorded snow	1.5 inches (4 cm)	June 4, 1935	Mizpah
Most snow, 24 hours	36 inches (91 cm)	January 7, 1994	Lake County
Most snow, one storm	47 inches (119 cm)	January 6–8, 1994	Lake County
Most snow, one month	66 inches (168 cm)	March, 1965	Collegeville
Most snow, season	170 inches (432 cm)	1949 – 1950	Grand Portage State Park
Deepest snowpack	75 inches (191 cm)	March 28, 1950	Pigeon River Bridge
Most fatalities, winter storm	up to 200	January 12–13, 1888	Statewide

=== Tornadoes ===
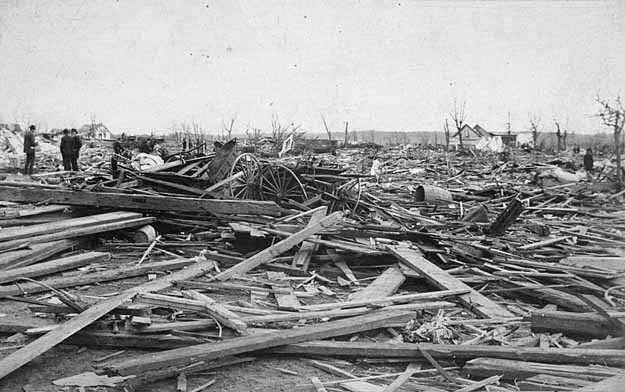
Damage from the 1886 Sauk Rapids tornado, Minnesota's deadliest tornado on record.

Event		Date	Location
Most in one day	48	June 17, 2010	Statewide
Most in one month	71	June 2010	Statewide
Most in one year	113	2010	Statewide
Earliest in season		March 6, 2017	Faribault County
Earliest outbreak in season (2 or more)	3	March 6, 2017	Sherburne, Faribault, and Freeborn counties
Latest in season		December 15, 2021	Eyota
Latest outbreak in season (2 or more)	22	December 15, 2021	Dodge, Fairbault, Fillmore, Freeborn, Goodhue, Houston, Mower, Steele, Wabasha, and Winona counties
Most fatalities, single tornado	72	April 14, 1886	St. Cloud, Sauk Rapids, Rice
Most intense damage measured	F5	June 13, 1968; June 16, 1992	Tracy; Chandler
Longest track (broken path)	110 miles (177 km)	August 26, 1977	Otter Tail, Wadena, Cass, Crow Wing counties
Longest track (continuous path)	67 miles (108 km)	March 29, 1998	Murray, Cottonwood, Brown, Watonwan, Blue Earth, Nicollet counties
Biggest outbreak	48	June 2010 Northern Plains tornado outbreak	Statewide

=== Hail ===
Event	Measurement	Date	Location
Largest hailstone	6 inches (15 cm) dia.	July 4, 1968; July 28, 1986	Edgerton; Reading

=== Flooding ===
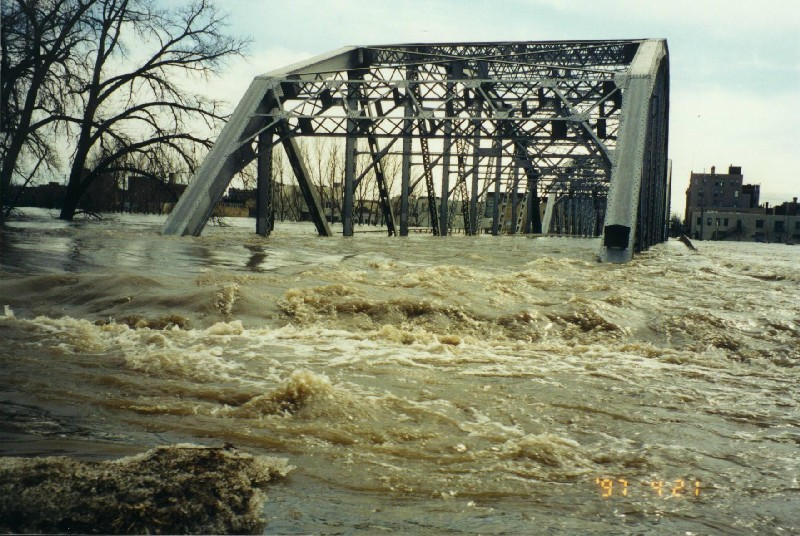
A bridge connecting East Grand Forks, Minnesota to Grand Forks, North Dakota is submerged during the record flooding of the Red River in 1997.

Record flood stages for selected cities in Minnesota

Event	Measurement	Date	Location
Middle Fork, Whitewater River
Highest flood stage	19.24 ft	August 19, 2007	Whitewater State Park
Root River
Highest flood stage	18.75 ft	August 19, 2007	Houston
Red River of the North
Highest flood stage	40.82 ft	March 28, 2009	Moorhead
Highest flood stage	54.35 ft	April 22, 1997	East Grand Forks
Minnesota River
Highest flood stage	23.90 ft	April 6, 1997	Montevideo
Highest flood stage	35.07 ft	April 12, 1965	Jordan
Mississippi River
Highest flood stage	26.01 ft	April 16, 1965	St. Paul
Highest flood stage	20.77 ft	April 19, 1965	Winona

== Other records ==
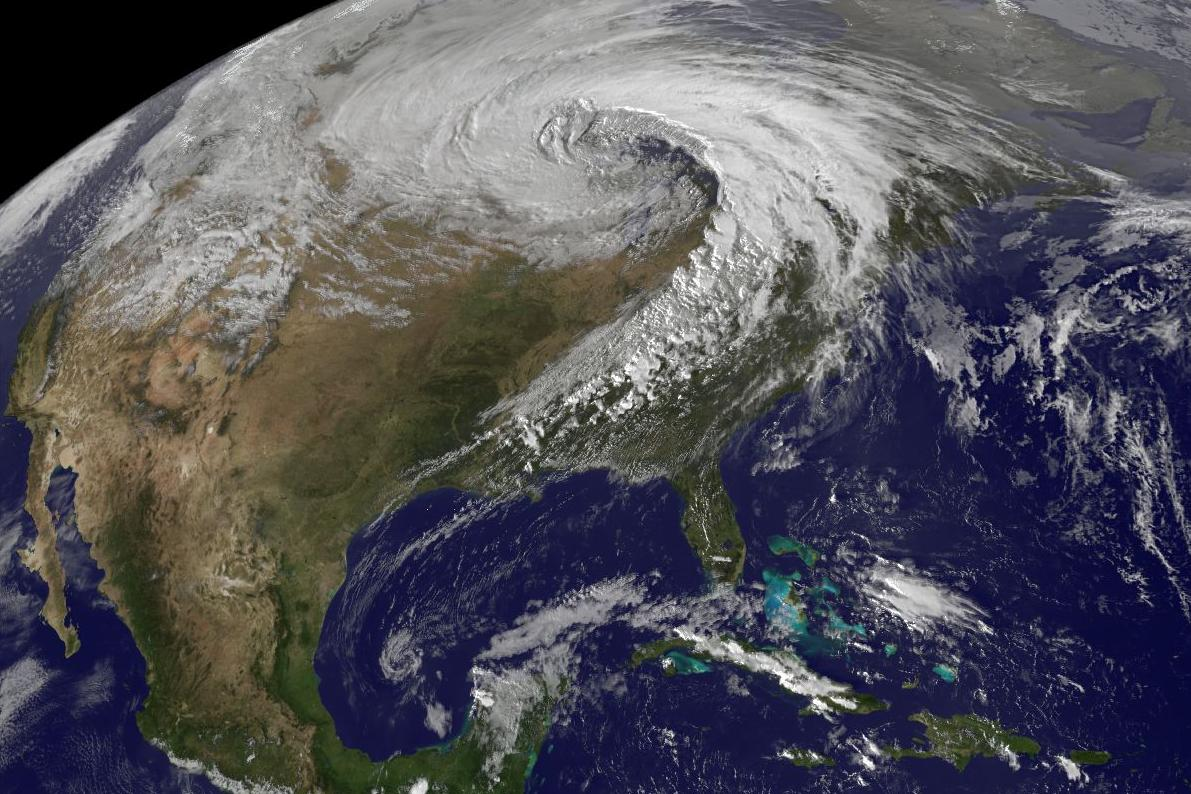
The area of Low pressure that caused the United States' lowest recorded continental atmospheric pressure on October 26, 2010 over Minnesota

Event	Measurement	Date	Location
Highest Pressure	31.11 inHg (1053.5 mb)	January 21, 1922	Collegeville
Lowest Pressure	28.21 inHg (956 mb)	October 26, 2010	Bigfork
Highest dew point	88 °F (31 °C)	July 18, 2011; July 19, 2011	Madison; Moorhead
Highest heat index	134 °F (57 °C)	July 19, 2011	Moorhead
Lowest wind chill (estimated)	−100 °F (−73 °C) (old formula) −77 °F (−61 °C) (new formula)	January 9–10, 1982 – January 29, 2019	Thief River Falls
Highest wind (sustained)	121 mph (194 km/h)	September 1, 2011	Donaldson
Highest wind (gust)	180 mph (290 km/h)	August 20, 1904	St. Paul

== See also ==
General

- List of weather records

Large-scale events that affected Minnesota

- 2007 Midwest flooding
- Mid-June 1992 Tornado Outbreak
- 1968 Tracy tornado
- 1991 Halloween blizzard
- Great Storm of 1975
- 1936 North American heat wave
- 1997 Red River Flood
- Armistice Day Blizzard
