= 1991 Halloween blizzard =

Storm that affected the Upper Midwest of the United States

- The blizzard developing over the Central U.S on October 31

Meteorological history
- Formed: October 31, 1991
- Dissipated: November 4, 1991

Category 5 "Extreme" blizzard
- Regional snowfall index: 30.40 (NOAA)
- Lowest pressure: 984 mbar (hPa); 29.06 inHg
- Max. snowfall: 36.9 inches (93.7 cm) (Duluth, MN)

Overall effects
- Fatalities: 22
- Damage: $100 million (2005 USD)
- Areas affected: Central United States, Great Lakes region, Eastern Canada
- Power outages: 100,000

The 1991 Halloween blizzard was a powerful storm that caused a period of heavy snowfall and ice accumulation, which affected parts of the Upper Midwest of the United States, from October 31 to November 4, 1991. Over the last week of October 1991, a large storm system over the Atlantic Ocean (1991 Perfect Storm) blocked most of the weather patterns over the eastern half of the United States, and in turn, moisture from the Gulf of Mexico was funneled straight northward over the affected region. By the time the precipitation stopped falling, many cities in the eastern half of Minnesota and northwestern Wisconsin had witnessed record early-season snowflake piling accumulations, while parts of southern Minnesota and northern Iowa were crippled by a large ice storm. Arctic air that was pulled southward behind the storm had combined with the heavy snow pack to produce many record low temperatures. Between the blizzard and the ice storm, 22 people were killed and over 100 were injured.

== Meteorological synopsis ==
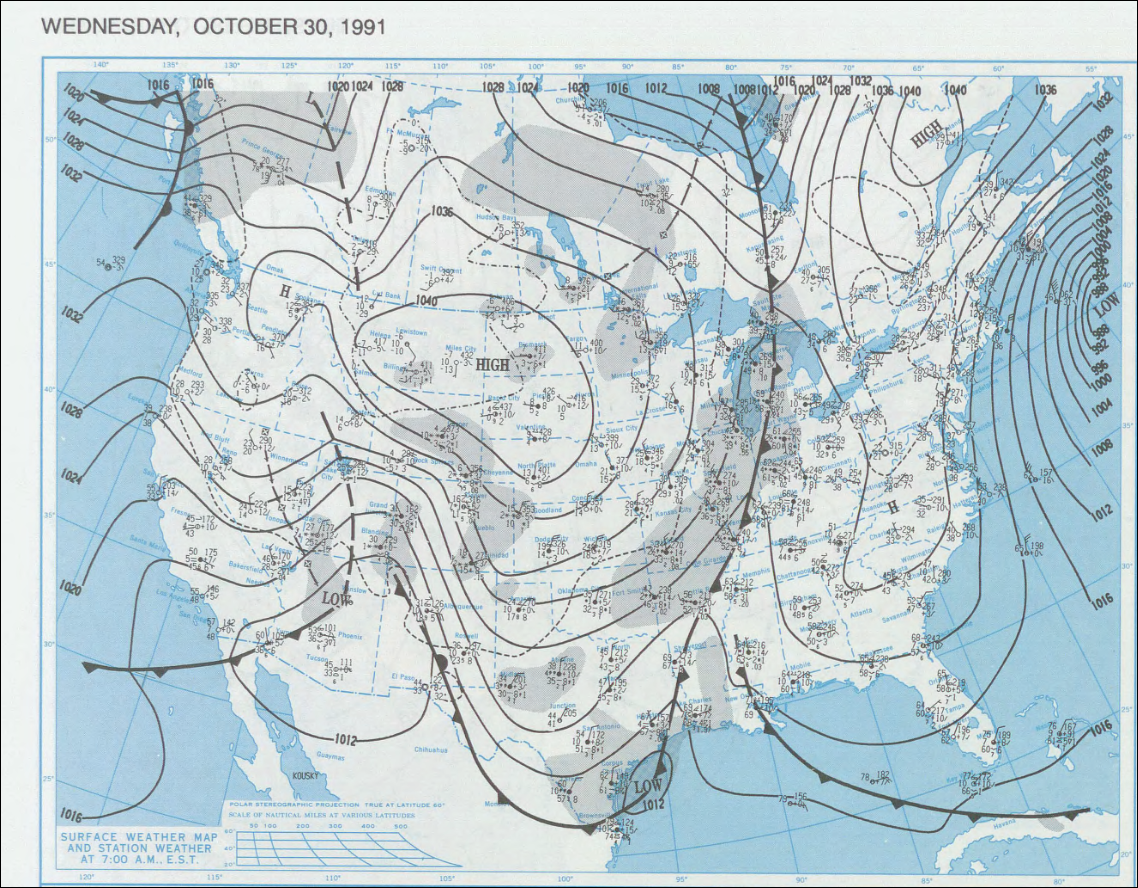
Surface map from October 30, 1991. A cold front stretched from the Hudson Bay to the Gulf of Mexico. The extratropical low off the East Coast can be seen, and would later develop into the 1991 Perfect Storm.

A volcanic winter is thought to have started with the 1991 eruption of Mount Pinatubo. The large quantities of ash and sulfur dioxide it released into the stratosphere formed an aerosol layer that blocked sunlight from reaching the Earth's surface and reflected solar radiation back into space. This caused global temperatures to drop by up to 0.5 - 0.6°C (0.9 - 1.1°F) from 1991 to 1993. The eruption, while not directly responsible, climatic effects may have played a part in the formation of the blizzard. Extreme weather volatility tied to Pinatubo was noted by meteorologists at the time, and the eruption's cooling effect and shifts in circulation are considered likely influences on this intense and unseasonal storm.

The 1991 Halloween Blizzard developed from a strong arctic cold front that pushed south and east through the central United States several days prior. On October 28, temperatures to the east of the cold front were above normal. High temperatures reached into the 70s from the middle Mississippi River Valley south into northern Texas, and into the 80s across much of central and southern Texas. Meanwhile, high temperatures remained below 20 °F (−7 °C) Fahrenheit across most of Montana and Wyoming.

The contrast between the two air masses was stark, and by the morning of October 29 the cold front was about halfway through Texas. At 6 am CST, the temperature in the western Texas city of Amarillo had dropped to 22 °F (−6 °C) with a strong northerly breeze. Farther east in Texas, the temperature was 64 in Dallas – a 42-degree temperature difference over about 300 miles (480 km). In the northern United States, morning lows were much colder. Temperatures were in the single digits across Montana and Wyoming and in the teens in North Dakota and South Dakota.

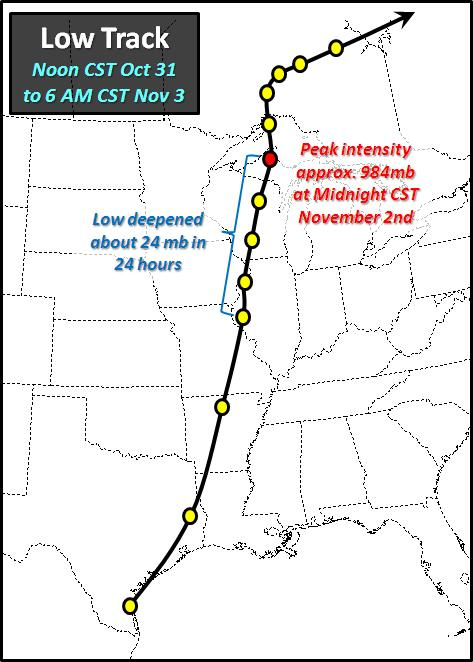
The track of the low pressure system that spawned the Halloween Blizzard

By October 30, the cold front had pushed east to the Texas shoreline with the Gulf of Mexico, and stalled in that location. As an upper-level shortwave trough approached the Southern Plains, it aided the development of an area of surface low pressure along the sharp temperature gradient near the Texas Gulf Coast. The development of low-pressure systems along coastal fronts in this fashion is relatively common in the cool season along the Texas Gulf Coast and along the Atlantic Seaboard near the Gulf Stream current.

From October 30 – 31, this low-pressure system slowly became better organized over Texas, before it ejected north over the Mississippi River Valley. This meridional trajectory of a low pressure track (almost due north from the western Gulf) is climatologically favorable to produce very heavy snowfall in the winter months because it allows copious amounts of moisture to flow north where it can interact with colder air. Cooler readings lingered at the very end of October across the Upper Midwest, and a re-enforcing pool of Arctic air was just beginning to push southeast through the western Canadian Provinces.

On November 1, the low-pressure system moved north from western Illinois into the Upper Peninsula of Michigan and the minimum pressure fell about 24 millibars in 24 hours, indicative of rapid deepening and strengthening of the cyclone. The low pressure eventually became occluded, weakened, and then continued to dissipate as it pushed east across northern Ontario in subsequent days.

== Precipitation ==
The precipitation from this system began falling as snow in Iowa late on October 30, and by the morning of October 31, it had changed over to ice and spread northward across southeast Minnesota. During Halloween day, the precipitation spread to the north, where it fell mostly as rapidly accumulating snow. The snow continued to develop northward, eventually spreading into the Minnesota Arrowhead. Eventually all of the precipitation changed over to snow, and in some areas it would continue falling until November 4.

=== Snow ===
The heavy snow began falling across east central Minnesota and northwest Wisconsin during the late afternoon hours of October 31. By midnight, the Twin Cities had already recorded 8.2 in (20.8 cm) of snow. This not only set a record for the largest amount of snow on that date, but also for the most snow ever recorded in the Twin Cities during the month of October at that time. As the storm system pushed its way northward, more communities in eastern Minnesota and northwestern Wisconsin began to experience similar conditions; and thundersnow occurred as far north as Duluth.

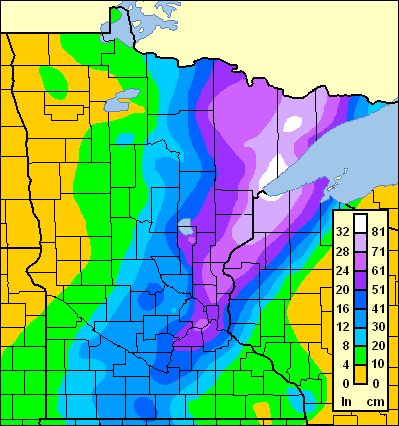
Snowfall totals for the Halloween Blizzard

Over the next two days the snow continued to fall, leading to additional snowfall of one to two feet (30 cm to 60 cm). By the time the snowfall ended on November 4, the storm had dropped 36.9 in (93.7 cm) on Duluth, the largest single snow storm total in Minnesota history at that time. The Twin Cities received 28.8 in (72.1 cm), setting a single-storm record for the metropolitan area. In all, at least one foot (30 cm) of snow fell in a swath approximately 100 mi (160 km) wide from south central Minnesota, northeastward into northwestern Wisconsin and into the Minnesota Arrowhead. A more narrow band of 2+ ft (60+ cm) of snow fell from the Twin Cities to Duluth and northward.

=== Ice ===
Areas of southern Minnesota and Iowa along and south of the I-90 corridor did not see as much snow, but instead saw a major ice storm. Though the precipitation started out as snow in these areas, it changed over to ice during the day on October 31 and continued falling over the next day. Ice accumulations as high as 2–3 in (6 cm–9 cm) were recorded in these areas before the precipitation changed to snow. Up to 10 in (25.4 cm) of snow proceeded to fall on top of ice accumulations from the previous day, making travel even more treacherous. Up to 1 inch of ice accumulation was reported as far south as Omaha, Nebraska.

== Impact ==
Most of Minnesota, western Wisconsin and northern Iowa were heavily impacted by the storm. $63+ million in damages was reported from fallen power lines, and $5 million in crop damages were reported in Iowa. Eleven counties in southern Minnesota were declared federal disaster areas, and 52 counties in Iowa were declared disaster areas. At least 100,000 people lost power because of the weight of the ice downing power lines, and in some cases it took up to a week for the power to be restored.

Many roads were closed both from the snow and ice, including long stretches of I-90, I-35 and I-29 in Iowa, Minnesota and South Dakota. Highway snow removal was hindered by record cold temperatures that followed the storm and transportation was hampered for many days. Nine hundred schools and business were closed in Minnesota alone. The storm occurred on a Thursday night. Schools in Minong, Wisconsin (40 miles southeast of Superior) were closed even the Monday following the storm. Twenty-two people died in this storm, twenty in Minnesota and two on the Mississippi River near La Crosse.

== Records ==
In eastern Minnesota, the Halloween Blizzard shattered many of the previous October snowfall records. The 8 inches that fell in the Twin Cities on October 31 was more snow than had ever been recorded in any October in its recorded history. November 1 saw similar daily records fall, but with a more wide reaching area from most of central Minnesota eastward to La Crosse and Eau Claire, Wisconsin. Following the storm Arctic air poured southward from Canada to produce many record low temperatures in these same areas. Bismarck, North Dakota, sank to −10 °F (−23 °C) on October 31, breaking their previous record low of 6 °F (−14 °C) by 16 degrees. Record snow and cold was recorded as far south as Nebraska and Colorado. The Arctic air also spread over Chicago, recording a low of 11 on November 4.

Four weeks later on November 29 – 30, another large storm system dropped as much as 18 inches of snow over these same areas. These two storms combined to set a single-month record for most snowfall in the Twin Cities and Duluth.

Records tied or broken during the Halloween Blizzard
Event	1991 record	Old Record (1891–1990)
Duluth, Minnesota
Most snow on October 31	4.2 in (10.6 cm)	m
Most snow on November 1	24.1 in (61.2 cm)	m
Most single storm snow total	36.9 in (93.7 cm)	m
Most snowfall in any month	50.1 in (127.3 cm) (Nov, 1991)	46.8 in (118.9 cm) (Jan, 1969)
Eau Claire, Wisconsin
Most snow on November 1	3.1 in (7.9 cm)	m
International Falls, Minnesota
Most snow on November 1	11.6 in (29.5 cm )	2.7 in (1974)
La Crosse, Wisconsin
Most snow on November 1	9.2 in (23.4 cm)	m
Omaha, Nebraska
Most snow on October 31	5.7 in	
St. Cloud, Minnesota
Most snow on October 31	3.1 in (7.9 cm)	.5 in (1943)
Most snow on November 1	9.0 in (22.9 cm )	3 in (1920)
Sioux Falls, South Dakota
Earliest 6 in snowfall	11.2 in	m
Most snow in October	10.0 in	m
Twin Cities
Most snow on October 31	8.2 in (20.8 cm)	0.4 in (1 cm) (1954)
Most snow on November 1	18.5 in (47 cm)	3.6 in (9.1 cm) (1941)
24‑hour snowfall in any season	21.0 in (53.3 cm)	18.5 in (47 cm) (January 23, 1982)
Most single storm snow total	28.4 in (72.9 cm)	20.0 in (50.8 cm) (Jan 22–23, 1982)
Most snow in October	8.2 in (20.8 cm)	5.5 in (14 cm) (1905)
Earliest 8 inch snow	8.2 in (20.8 cm)	8.5 in (21.6 cm) (Nov 8, 1943)
Most snowfall in any month	46.9 in (119.1 cm) (Nov, 1991)	46.4 in (117.9 cm) (Jan, 1982)
Earliest autumn below zero low	−3 °F (−19 °C) (Nov 4)	−1 °F (−18 °C) (Nov 11, 1986)

== See also ==
- Climate of Minnesota
- List of Minnesota weather records
- Blizzard
- 1991 Perfect Storm – A nor'easter that transitioned into a hurricane around the same time, before making landfall in Nova Scotia
