= September 2010 Minnesota-Wisconsin flood =

2010 flooding in Minnesota and Wisconsin, United States

September 2010 Minnesota-Wisconsin Flood
- U.S Route 169 collapsed North of St. Peter, Minnesota
- Date: September 23rd - October 9th
- Location: Minnesota and Wisconsin
- Property damage: $68.5 million (2010 USD)

September 2010 flash flooding in Minnesota and Wisconsin put towns underwater and forced evacuations in southern Minnesota and central Wisconsin. A strong system caused the heavy rain and flash flooding in the Upper Midwest.

== Causes ==
Several waves of thunderstorms associated with a slow-moving warm front produced unusually heavy rainfall throughout the region beginning in the early afternoon of September 22 and continuing until the evening of September 23. Tropical moisture moving northward from remnants of tropical storm Georgette in the eastern Pacific and Hurricane Karl in the Gulf of Mexico contributed to heavy rainfall. The highest rainfall reported for the two-day period in Minnesota was 11.06 inches (281 mm), recorded by a volunteer observer near Winnebago in Faribault County. The highest official National Weather Service report was 10.68 inches (271 mm), observed at Amboy in Blue Earth County. Most locations in southern Minnesota reported more than 4 inches (100 mm), with numerous locations recording 6 inches (150 mm) or more. The areal extent of extreme rainfall was unusually large; more than 5,000 square miles (13,000 km^{2}) in Minnesota received more than 6 inches (150 mm).

== River stages and flooding ==
Soil moisture levels in the affected region were high prior to the storms, increasing runoff. Water levels in area rivers rose beginning on September 23 and for several days thereafter, with some of the highest water levels occurring a week after the heavy rains. The Minnesota River crested at a record-high stage at Henderson, Minnesota, and near-record river stages were recorded on the Minnesota River at New Ulm, Mankato, St Peter, Jordan, Shakopee, and Savage. Records were also broken on the Cannon River and the Zumbro River in Minnesota and Yellow River at Babcock, Wisconsin, near-record flood crests were recorded on the Black, Trempealeau, and Wisconsin Rivers in Wisconsin. On September 29, the Mississippi River at St. Paul rose above flood stage, marking the first time since record-keeping began in 1893 that the river exceeded flood stage during the autumn months. River flooding in the region is typically associated with spring snowmelt.

Flooding forced evacuations in communities including New Richland, Owatonna, Pine Island, Zumbro Falls, Hammond, and Waseca, Minnesota, and Arcadia and Black River Falls, Wisconsin. Some major roads, including portions of Interstate 35 and roads in the southwestern Twin Cities metropolitan area, were closed due to high water levels on rivers. As floodwaters moved downstream, high water levels on the Wisconsin River closed some major roads in and around Stevens Point in central Wisconsin.

== Damages ==
As of September 24, there had been no deaths or injuries from the flooding. However, the heavy rainfall and flooding caused significant adverse effects on crop production in the region by delaying fall harvesting and reducing crop yields. University of Minnesota Extension estimated that over 100,000 acres (400 km^{2}) of the state's corn and soybean fields were covered by standing water for several hours or longer. In Wisconsin, the September rains and flooding contributed to a poor quality potato crop and the failure of a large fraction of the state's cabbage crop.

As of September 29, Wisconsin authorities reported that flooding had destroyed three homes and caused more than $4.6 million in damages to public infrastructure. A preliminary assessment of damages in Minnesota estimated their total cost as $64.1 million and identified 80 homes as having been destroyed.

== Disaster declarations ==
The governors of Minnesota and Wisconsin declared states of emergency during the flooding.

On October 13, 2010, the U.S. federal government declared the flooding to have been a "major disaster" in a 21-county region of Minnesota. Eight additional Minnesota counties were added to the disaster area declaration on October 19. Nine Wisconsin counties were included in a disaster declaration on October 21. These declarations made local governments and some nonprofit organizations in the affected region eligible for Federal Emergency Management Agency financial assistance to cover 75 percent of their costs for emergency work and repair or replacement of damaged facilities.
