= 1904 Waconia Cyclone =

1904 tornado in Minnesota

- The Swedish Episcopal Church, destroyed by the tornado

Meteorological history
- Formed: August 20, 1920
- Dissipated: August 20, 1920

The 1904 Waconia Cyclone was a destructive tornado that affected much of the city of Waconia in central Carver County, Minnesota, on August 20, 1904. The cyclone killed a total of 5 people in Waconia and injured a total of 20. The storm devasted other communities in the Minneapolis–Saint Paul metropolitan area including St. Louis Park and Saint Paul, as well as portions of eastern South Dakota.

== Meteorological synopsis ==
On August 20, 1904 an estimated F4 tornado touched down near Willow Lake, South Dakota moving east-southeast through the city of Bryant in Hamlin County, South Dakota before turning eastward into western and central Minnesota.

== Tornado summary ==
Sporadic rain began to fall around 6:00 pm in Waconia, following the rain the sky began to turn green, blue, and yellow, likely caused by hail-producing derechos. Hard rain continued to fall again around 7:30 pm accompanied by dangerous winds. The tornado eventually passed through Waconia moving eastward destroying various structures and killing several people. One person, A.C. Klancke, was picked up by the tornado, carried 8 city blocks, and suddenly dropped. Despite his injuries, including several broken bones, Klancke survived the encounter with the tornado.

== Impact ==
The tornado left over 100 homes damaged throughout Waconia and the nearby Coney Island, the community saw extensive property damage throughout much of the downtown area including local businesses and the old wooden city hall. St. Joseph's Catholic Church, originally constructed in 1901, was also severely damaged from the tornado which left the parish's steeple in ruin. Trinity Lutheran Church in Waconia also suffered damages from the storm.

== Casualties ==
Despite the storm's extensive amounts of damage to property throughout the city only 5 people in Waconia were killed by the storm, 20 more were injured. People killed in the storm in Waconia include three members of the Moy family, Hubert Lohmer, and Maria Straus. The storm is noted as being the deadliest in Waconia's history. A total of 14 people were killed in the storm in the whole of Minnesota with 200 others being injured in eastern Minnesota. Total damages are estimated at 2.5 million dollars, roughly 60 million dollars in the 21st century.

== See also ==
- List of North American tornadoes and tornado outbreaks
- List of F4, EF4, and IF4 tornadoes
