= Panhandle hook =

Type of storm system in southern US

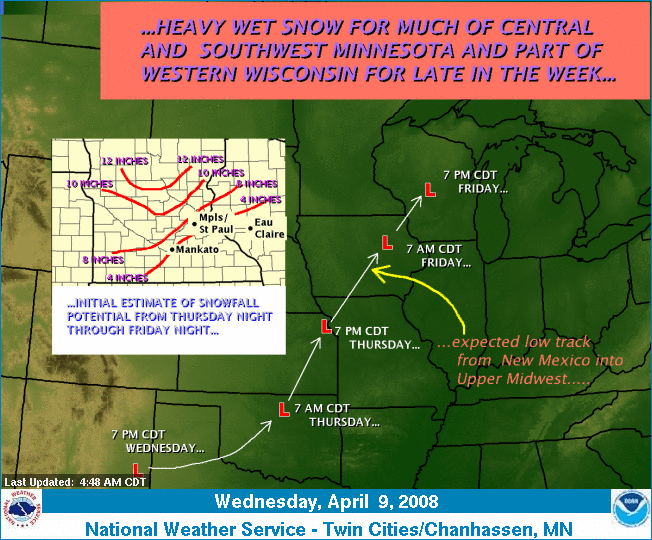
A common track of a Panhandle Hook winter storm as it curves from Texas, northeastward towards the Great Lakes region.

A panhandle hook (also called a pan handle hook or Texas hooker) is a relatively infrequent winter storm system whose cyclogenesis occurs in the South to southwestern United States from the late fall through winter and into the early spring months. They trek to the northeast on a path towards the Great Lakes region, as the southwesterly jet streams are most prevalent, usually affecting the Midwestern United States and Eastern Canada. Panhandle hooks account for some of the most memorable and deadly blizzards and snowstorms in North America. The name is derived from the region of surface cyclogenesis in the Texas panhandle and Oklahoma panhandle regions. In some winters, there are no panhandle hook storms; in others, there are several.

== Formation ==
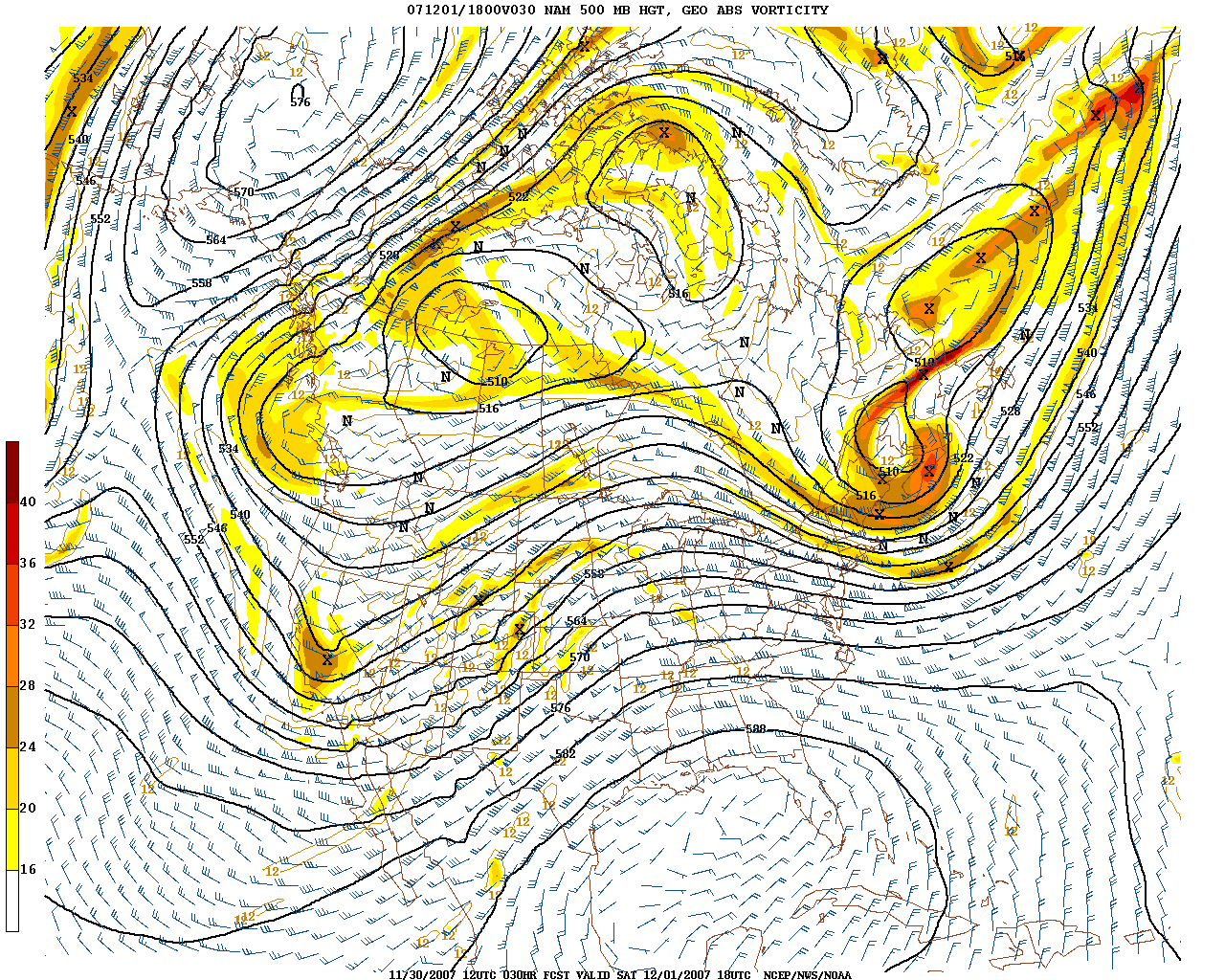
Typical Southwest circulation, east of the Rockies, of a Colorado low. For a Panhandle hook, the flow should be slightly further east.

A panhandle hook storm has its origins as a strong shortwave low pressure system which traverses the base of a long-wave low pressure trough while geographically coincident with the southwestern United States. Such systems ubiquitously develop a surface low-pressure system in the northwestern Texas and western Oklahoma area (as an eddy effect interaction of the topography of the Rocky Mountains in relation to the jet stream) with associated warm front and cold front, with attending snow to the northwest of the low and severe thunderstorms to the southeast -- the "hook" refers to the left-ward east to northeast jog in the track of the surface low as it is plotted on a weather analysis chart.

If the associated jet stream is stronger than normal and there is colder than normal air in place in central Canada to provide a greater than normal temperature contrast with Gulf of Mexico moisture drawn northward by the developing panhandle low, surface cyclogenesis can be particularly energetic and cause a great swath of heavy snow to develop and blanket a large portion of the American Great Plains and upper-midwestern states in conjunction with very strong winds, the combination of which exceeds blizzard criteria. Over the Great Lakes, the interaction of these storms with the lakes can amplify windspeeds causing extreme heavy sometimes localized snowfall, thundersnow and often shoreline erosion. Initially pleasant weather ahead of the northeast-bound storm can lull the unwary into dressing lightly and then being surprised by heavy snow accompanied by howling easterly and northerly winds as the low traverses south to east of their location.

== Historic panhandle hooks ==
Famous storms that were panhandle hooks are the Armistice Day Blizzard of November 11, 1940, and the storm which sank the Edmund Fitzgerald on November 10, 1975.

== See also ==
- Alberta clipper
- Colorado low
- Gulf low
- Nor'easter
- Salient (geography), official name for panhandle
