= Alberta clipper =

Low pressure area weather system common to North America

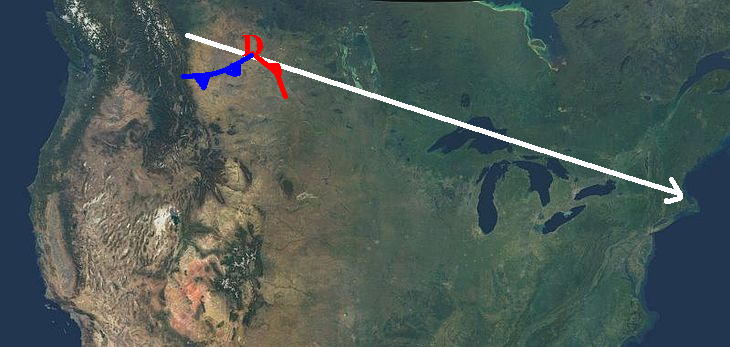
Average trajectory of a clipper

An Alberta clipper, also known as an Alberta low, Alberta cyclone, Alberta lee cyclone, Canadian clipper, or simply clipper, is a fast-moving low-pressure system that originates in or near the Canadian province of Alberta just east of the Rocky Mountains and tracks east-southeastward across southern Canada and the northern United States to the North Atlantic Ocean.

Alberta clippers constitute a major winter-season storm track for extratropical cyclones in the Northern Hemisphere, tracking across the continent in 2–3 days while affecting weather in parts of the Prairies and central provinces of Canada, as well as the Upper Midwest, Great Lakes, and New England portions of the United States. They are associated with cold, dry continental air masses and generate small-scale, short-lived weather events typically producing 8–15 cm (3.1–5.9 in) of snow in a three to six hour period. However, they can precipitate sudden temperature drops and sharp winds leading to local blizzard conditions, especially when interacting with moisture from the Great Lakes.

== Etymology ==
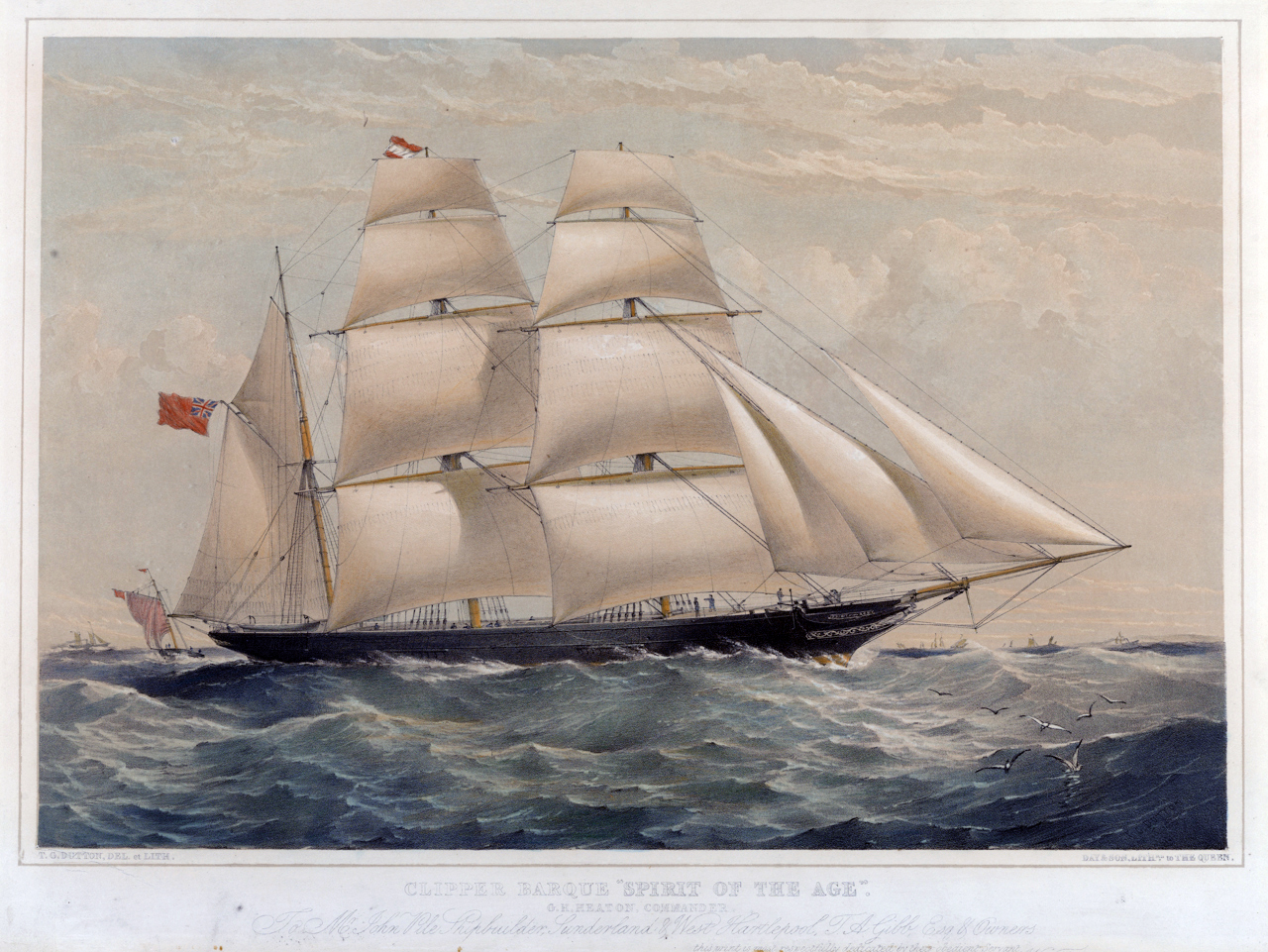
Clipper barque Spirit of the Age 1854 by T. G. Dutton

Alberta clippers take their name from Alberta, the province from which they appear to descend, and from clipper ships of the 19th century, one of the fastest ships of that time.

The term was coined in the late 1960s by Rheinhart Harms, a meteorologist at the U.S. National Weather Service Office in Milwaukee, Wisconsin, who noted the rapid speed of these snow-producing storms as they moved across the Dakotas from Alberta towards the Great Lakes. Its colloquial use spread among U.S. and Canadian weather forecasters in the early 1970s. It entered the scientific literature around the 1990s.

Storms beginning their southward treks from other Canadian provinces, far less common than clippers, are often still referred to as clippers, or by the fanciful names Saskatchewan screamer, Manitoba mauler or Ontario scari-o.

== Formation ==
Typical winter storm tracks in Minnesota.

A clipper originates when warm, moist winds from the Pacific Ocean come into contact with the mountains in the provinces of British Columbia and then Alberta. The air travels down the lee side of the mountains, often forming a chinook in Alberta, then develops into a storm over the Canadian prairies when it becomes entangled with the cold air mass that normally occupies that region in winter. The storm then moves east-southeast riding the jet stream, and passes off the upper Atlantic Coast, normally north of Delaware Bay.

The chinook, which in part originates the Alberta clipper, usually brings relatively warm weather (often approaching 10 °C (50 °F) in the depths of winter) to southern Alberta itself, and the term is therefore not used in Alberta.

== Effects ==
The storms sweep in at high speed over whatever land they encounter, usually bringing with them sharp cold fronts and drastically lower temperatures. It is not uncommon for an Alberta clipper to cause temperatures to drop by 16 °C (29 °F) in as little as 10 to 12 hours. Often, the storms bring biting winds with them, only increasing the effect of the lower temperatures. Winds in advance of and during an Alberta clipper are frequently as high as 56 to 72 km/h (35 to 45 mph). These conditions would cause wind chill values to drop into the −30 to −45 °C (−22 to −49 °F) range across the upper Midwest and Great Lakes.

Snowfall amounts with these systems tend to be small (on the order of 2.5–7 cm [0.98–2.76 in]), as the relative lack of moisture and quick movement inhibit substantial snowfall totals. However, several factors could combine to produce higher snow accumulations (15 cm (5.9 in) or more). These factors include access to more moisture (which raises precipitation amounts), slower system movement (which increases snowfall duration), and colder temperatures (which increases the snow to water ratio). The southern and eastern shores of the Great Lakes often receive enhanced snowfall from Alberta clippers during the winter, due to lake enhancement. The lake-effect snow can add substantially to the overall snowfall total.

Occasionally the clippers, when reaching the upper Atlantic seaboard (usually north of Delaware), "bomb out" and can cause severe winter weather along the coast from Boston northward as Atlantic moisture is tapped. Snowfall amounts can approach 15–30 cm (6–12 in) or more when this happens. However, typically, Alberta clippers are not large snow producers south of Boston.

During the winter, Alberta clippers can occur somewhat frequently, with system intervals on the order of two to four days common during active periods.

== See also ==
- Ground blizzard
- Panhandle hook
- Polar vortex
- Snow squall
- Wind chill
