= National Register of Historic Places listings in Nobles County, Minnesota =

Location of Nobles County in Minnesota

This is a list of the National Register of Historic Places listings in Nobles County, Minnesota. It is intended to be a complete list of the properties and districts on the National Register of Historic Places in Nobles County, Minnesota, United States. The locations of National Register properties and districts for which the latitude and longitude coordinates are included below, may be seen in an online map.

There are 12 properties and districts listed on the National Register in the county.

This National Park Service list is complete through NPS recent listings posted January 30, 2026.

== Current listings ==
	Name on the Register	Image	Date listed	Location	City or town	Description
1	Church of St. Adrian–Catholic	Church of St. Adrian–Catholic	May 15, 1980 (#80002094)	512 Maine Avenue; 43°37′51″N 95°55′58″W	Adrian	Prominent 1900 church of the congregation at the heart of Catholic colonization of Nobles County under Bishop John Ireland beginning in 1877.
2	Church of St. Kilian (Catholic)	Church of St. Kilian (Catholic)	March 30, 1998 (#97001425)	313 4th Avenue; 43°47′23″N 95°52′10″W	St. Kilian	1900 church and cemetery encapsulating German immigration to rural Minnesota and the role of the Catholic Church in supporting general European migration to the state.
3	Citizens' National Bank	Citizens' National Bank	March 18, 1982 (#82002990)	326 10th Street; 43°37′13″N 95°35′49″W	Worthington	1901 bank symbolizing the economic and architectural evolution of Worthington, as one of the first and few surviving masonry buildings that replaced frame construction along the city's principle downtown block.
4	George D. Dayton House	George D. Dayton House	December 23, 2003 (#03001336)	1311 4th Avenue; 43°37′23″N 95°35′38″W	Worthington	1892 house of businessman and philanthropist George Dayton (1857–1938), a key patron of Worthington's economic and civic development. Now an event venue.
5	Hotel Thompson	Hotel Thompson	February 16, 1984 (#84001625)	300–310 10th Street; 43°37′12″N 95°35′47″W	Worthington	One of the largest and finest 20th-century hotels in southwest Minnesota, built 1911–1912; a major vote of confidence in Worthington's economic future by local entrepreneur Peter Thompson.
6	Dr. E.A. Kilbride Clinic	Dr. E.A. Kilbride Clinic	November 23, 1977 (#77000760)	701 11th Street; 43°37′24″N 95°35′58″W	Worthington	Hospital and clinic established in 1927, still having much of its original furnishings and equipment at the time of its nomination.
7	Nobles County War Memorial Building	Nobles County War Memorial Building	June 5, 2017 (#100001024)	407 12th Street; 43°37′19″N 95°35′44″W	Worthington	Prominent public building constructed 1962–63 to house a library branch, county historical society, and art center.
8	Siemer Silo and Barn	Siemer Silo and Barn	May 15, 1980 (#80002095)	County Highway 19; 43°34′41″N 96°00′45″W	Ellsworth	1918 barn and 1936 silo, the latter an extremely late example of the wood hoop construction common in the 19th century. Silo no longer on site as of October 2012.
9	Sioux City and St. Paul Railroad Section House		May 15, 1980 (#80002096)	Spencer and First Streets; 43°50′45″N 95°28′04″W	Dundee	1879 section house: the first house in Dundee, a rare example of an unaltered early residence, and a symbol of the importance of rail transport in Nobles County.
10	Slade Hotel	Slade Hotel	June 30, 1975 (#75000999)	116 2nd Street E. 43°38′07″N 95°55′58″W	Adrian	1891 hotel with a dining hall, a key gathering place for travelers and locals. Minnesota's oldest family-owned hotel at the time of its nomination.
11	Worthington Armory and Community Building	Worthington Armory and Community Building	November 27, 2017 (#100001844)	225 9th Street; 43°37′07″N 95°35′52″W	Worthington	1922 armory noted for its importance as a local center of both military and recreational activity, and for its Romanesque Revival architecture characteristic of the state's 1920s armories.
12	Worthington Band Shell	Worthington Band Shell	July 21, 2015 (#15000439)	418 Lake Avenue; 43°37′13″N 95°36′24″W	Worthington	Minnesota's only known band shell constructed by the National Youth Administration, built in 1941.

== Former listings ==
	Name on the Register	Image	Date listed	Date removed	Location	City or town	Description
1	Adrian State Bank	Adrian State Bank	May 15, 1980 (#80002093)	November 27, 2017	Main Street and Second Avenue; 43°38′07″N 95°56′00″W	Adrian	1891 brick Queen Anne bank. Demolished in the early 2000s due to structural concerns.

== See also ==
- List of National Historic Landmarks in Minnesota
- National Register of Historic Places listings in Minnesota
