= 1998 Comfrey–St. Peter tornado outbreak =

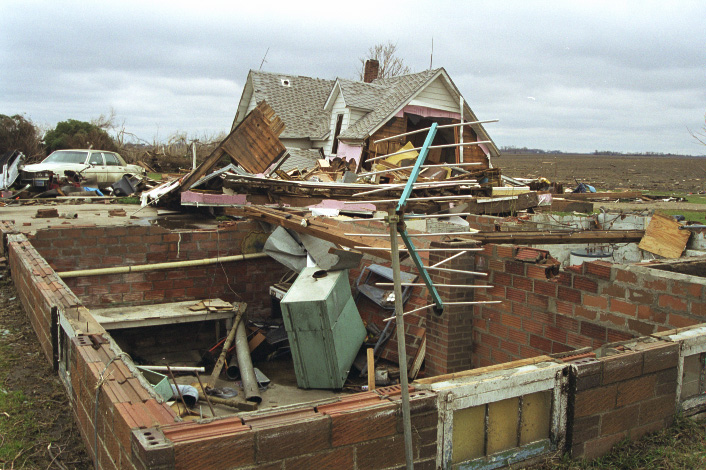
- A house blown off its foundation near Hanska, Minnesota, as a result of the Comfrey F4 tornado.

Meteorological history
- Duration: March 29, 1998

Tornado outbreak
- Tornadoes: 16
- Max. rating: F4 tornado
- Duration: 4 hours

Overall effects
- Casualties: 2 fatalities, 21 injuries
- Damage: $235 million (1998 USD) $310 million (2008 USD)
- Areas affected: Minnesota, Wisconsin

The 1998 Comfrey–St. Peter tornado outbreak was an unseasonably-strong tornado outbreak which affected the Upper Midwest region of the United States on March 29, 1998. A strong area of low pressure combined with a warm front and favorable upper-level dynamics to produce 16 tornadoes across the region—14 in Minnesota and two in Wisconsin. Thirteen of the tornadoes in Minnesota were spawned by a single supercell thunderstorm. This supercell remained intact for approximately 150 miles (240 km) as it moved across the southern part of the state during the late-afternoon hours.

Over $235 million in damage (1998 US$) was recorded from the tornadoes, two people were killed, and 21 others were injured. Most of the damage was caused by three tornadoes—one rated F4 on the Fujita scale that hit the town of Comfrey, Minnesota, an F3 that hit St. Peter, Minnesota, and an F2 that hit Le Center, Minnesota. Gustavus Adolphus College in St. Peter was especially hard-hit, with several buildings damaged or destroyed, 2,000 trees lost, and nearly 80% of the windows on the campus shattered. In Comfrey, 75% of the structures in the town were damaged or destroyed, including the local K–12 school. Seven counties in southern Minnesota were later declared federal disaster areas.

The outbreak broke many early-season tornado records for the state of Minnesota. The 14 total tornadoes in the state were the most to ever touch down on a single day in March. The F4 tornado was the strongest ever recorded in the state in March, and its 67-mile (108 km) path the longest tornado path ever recorded in Minnesota. In December 1998, the United States Department of Commerce awarded a bronze medal to the Twin Cities office of the National Weather Service (NWS) for providing excellent service to the public during the outbreak event.

== Meteorological synopsis ==
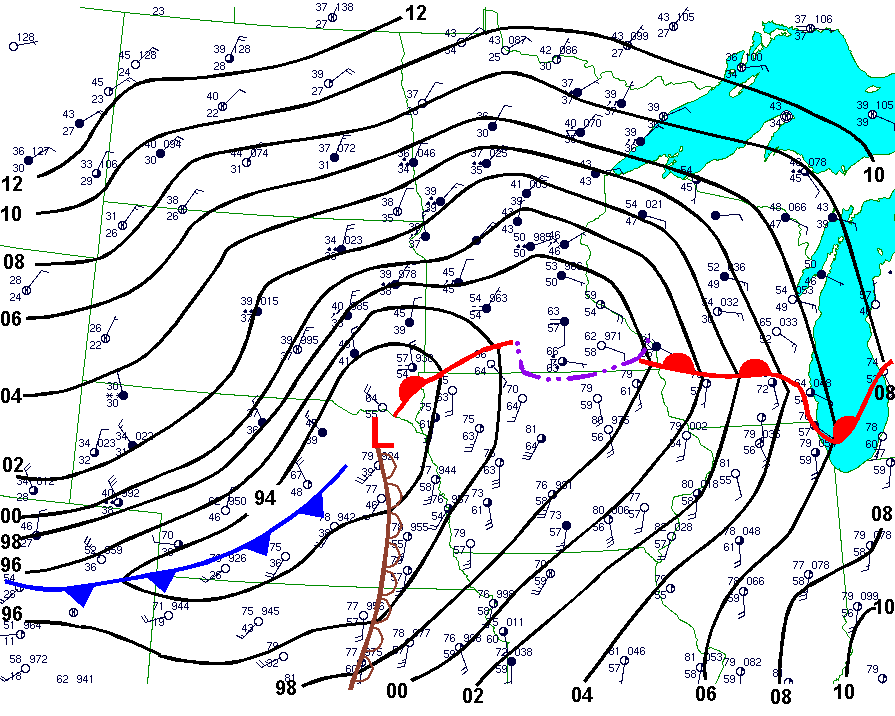
Surface map of the upper Midwest on March 29, 1998, at 3:00 pm CST (2100 UTC)

The driving force behind this tornado outbreak was a strong surface-based low-pressure area stationed over the western high plains. On the morning of March 29, the low was centered over eastern Wyoming, with a warm front stretching eastward across Nebraska and Iowa. An upper-level trough of low pressure was centered over the southwestern United States, which caused an upper-level jet stream with winds of 100 kn (120 mph; 190 km/h) to push towards Minnesota from the southwest. A low-level jet from the south with winds of 50 knots (60 mph; 90 km/h) transported a plume of warm, humid air into the region, helping to push temperatures above 70 °F (21 °C) and dew points into the middle 60s °F (around 20 °C). Winds on the surface were from the southeast, which created low-level wind shear; enhancing the potential for tornadoes.

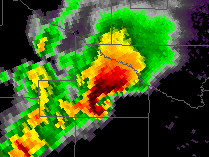
Radar image of the supercell thunderstorm as it produced an F4 tornado in Brown County, Minnesota

By early afternoon, the low-pressure area had moved east into Nebraska, while the warm front had moved northward into southern Minnesota. The atmosphere to the south of the warm front was strongly capped, meaning that the best chance of thunderstorm development was in areas along and slightly north of the front. By the time the thunderstorms started developing, CAPE values were 2000 J/kg, indicating moderate atmospheric instability. Also present were low-level and deep-layer wind shear values of 44 and 87 knots (51 and 100 mph; 81 and 161 km/h), respectively. All of these factors combined to create very favorable conditions for the development of severe thunderstorms and tornadoes.

The thunderstorms that would eventually spawn the tornadoes began forming in southeastern South Dakota around 2:00 pm. The first severe weather report of the outbreak was of 3/4 inch (19 mm) diameter hail 2 miles (3 km) south of Brandon, South Dakota. Shortly thereafter the thunderstorms moved east across the border into Minnesota. After several more reports of severe hail with the growing thunderstorms, the first tornado of the day—rated F2 on the Fujita scale—touched down at 3:23 pm 2 miles (3 km) north of Lismore. It was on the ground for less than 1 mile (2 km) and caused minor damage. Five more tornadoes (all rated F2 or lower) briefly touched down during the next hour in the same general area; none of which inflicted major damage. All of these tornadoes were spawned by the same supercell thunderstorm. During the remainder of the afternoon hours, this supercell would proceed to track east-northeast across southern Minnesota for 150 miles (240 km), tracking slightly north of the warm front.

== Forecasts ==
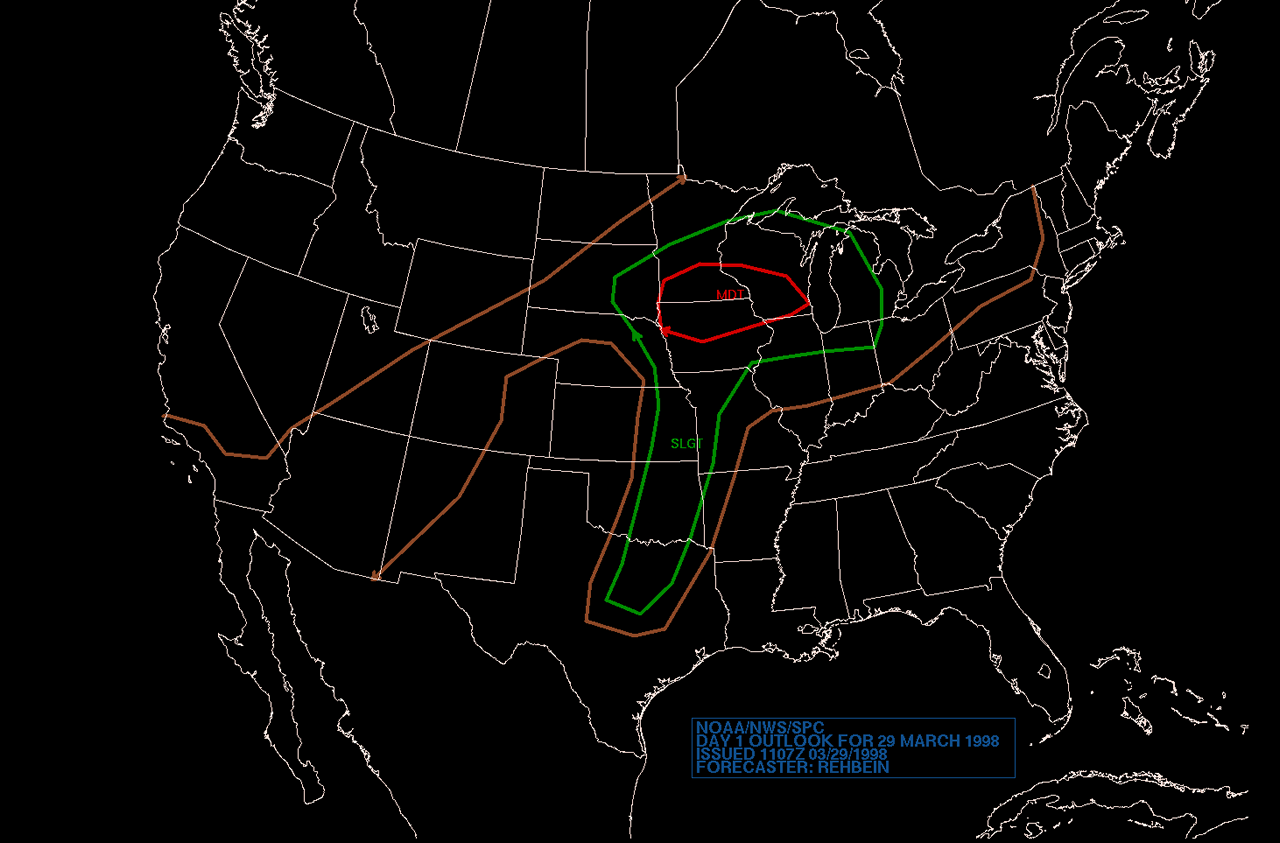
The SPC Day 1 severe weather outlook on March 29, 1998

Weather forecasters first began to notice the severity of the impending weather situation after the 6:00 pm CST (0000 UTC) computer model runs on the night of Friday, March 27. On Saturday, March 28 at 11:30 am the Storm Prediction Center issued a Day 2 moderate risk of severe weather for southeast Minnesota, northeast Iowa, northwest Illinois and much of Wisconsin. Later model runs on March 28 only increased forecasters' confidence that a major severe-weather event would occur the following day.

In the early-morning hours of Sunday March 29, forecasters at the Twin Cities NWS noticed that due to the model's prediction of strong wind shear and instability, the tornado risk was quite high for their region. Area forecast discussions during this period mentioned the possibility of F3-strength tornadoes later in the day. Also on the morning of March 29, the Storm Prediction Center issued a Day 1 moderate risk of severe weather. This moderate risk area was more narrow than the previous day's outlook, encompassing only southwest Wisconsin, northern Iowa and the southern third of Minnesota.

As the day moved on, the Twin Cities, Sioux Falls and La Crosse NWS forecast offices all saw the potential for "strong to violent" tornadoes, and used such verbiage in their forecasts. The Twin Cities NWS noted in their 12:26 pm forecast discussion that "thunderstorms located south of a Redwood Falls to Minneapolis to Rice Lake line could be particularly strong with the potential of tornadic thunderstorms". Just before 12:00 pm, the Storm Prediction Center issued a mesoscale discussion stating that "[g]iven strength of vertical shear profiles, CAPE on the order of 2000 J/kg will support increasing potential for tornadic supercells during the afternoon hours, especially along an axis roughly from Yankton through Sioux Falls into Redwood Falls and Minneapolis/Rochester areas. We will continue to monitor. Present indications are WW (Weather Watch) will be necessary within the next 2 to 3 hours." At 1:35 pm the Storm Prediction Center issued tornado watch No. 132 with a particularly dangerous situation designation. The watch area encompassed most of southern Minnesota and northern Iowa, along with small parts of northeast Nebraska, southeast South Dakota, southwest Wisconsin, and was made in effect from 2:00 pm to 8:00 pm.

== Confirmed tornadoes ==
Confirmed tornadoes by Fujita rating
FU	F0	F1	F2	F3	F4	F5	Total
0	6	3	5	1	1	0	16

=== March 29 event ===
List of confirmed tornadoes – Sunday, March 29, 1998
F#	Location	County	Time (UTC)	Path length	Damage
Minnesota
F2	N of Lismore	Nobles	2123	0 mi	Tornado destroyed buildings, and damaged trees along with numerous pieces of farm equipment. Two cattle were killed.
F0	E of Leota	Nobles	2125 pm	0 mi	Tornado damaged trees and a few buildings.
F0	N of Wilmont	Nobles	2128 pm	0 mi	Tornado damaged trees and a few buildings.
F2	NW of St. Kilian	Nobles	2135 pm	0 mi	Tornado destroyed farm buildings, uprooted numerous trees, and flipped a tractor-trailer.
F1	NE of St. Kilian	Nobles	2145 pm	0 mi	Tornado damaged trees and destroyed some old farm buildings.
F4	E of Avoca to E of Courtland	Murray, Cottonwood, Brown, Watonwan, Blue Earth, Nicollet	2150 pm	67 mi (108 km)	1 death – See section on this tornado
F1	SW of Fulda	Murray	2155 pm	0 mi	Tornado damaged trees and destroyed some old farm buildings.
F0	W of Wabasha	Wabasha	2307 pm	2 mi (3 km)	Brief tornado caused no damage.
F3	E of Nicollet to W of Le Center	Nicollet, Le Sueur	2318 pm	18 mi (29 km)	1 death – See section on this tornado
F2	Le Center	Le Sueur	2348 pm	17 mi (27 km)	See section on this tornado
F1	SW of Lonsdale	Rice	0009 pm	0 mi	Details unknown.
F2	Lonsdale	Rice	0016 pm	5 mi (8 km)	Considerable damage in the area. Four homes and 6 businesses were severely damaged. The street department building was damaged, and 20 farms were damaged or destroyed.
F2	WNW of Castle Rock	Dakota	0025 pm	3 mi (5 km)	Details unknown.
F0	SW of Hastings	Dakota	0043 pm	1 mi (1.6 km)	Brief tornado caused no damage.
Wisconsin
F0	S of Maxville	Buffalo	2315 pm	1 mi (1.6 km)	Brief tornado caused no damage.
F0	NW of Tomahawk	Lincoln	0128 pm	1 mi (1.6 km)	Tornado damaged several sheds, garages and a pole building.
Source: National Climatic Data Center

=== Comfrey, Minnesota ===
Comfrey, Minnesota
- The tornado near Hanska, Minnesota

Meteorological history
- Formed: March 29, 1998, 3:50 p.m. CDT (UTC−05:00) March 29 1998, 5:15 p.m. CDT (UTC−05:00)
- Duration: 1 hour, 25 minutes

F4 tornado
- on the Fujita scale
- Highest winds: 207–260 mph (333–418 km/h)

Overall effects
- Casualties: 1 fatality, 19 injuries
- Damage: $75 million (1998 USD)

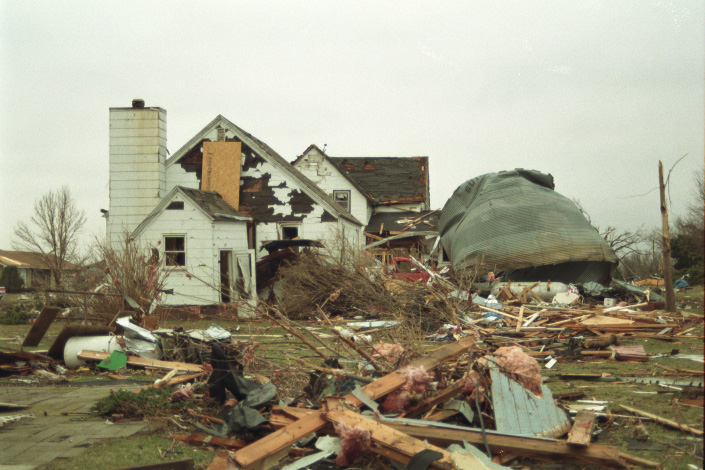
Damage to a house near Comfrey.

At 3:50 pm a tornado touched down 7 miles (11 km) east of Avoca, Minnesota, in eastern Murray County. As the tornado moved through Cottonwood County, it grew to a width of 900 yards (823 m) and obtained F3 strength. It destroyed numerous farms, farm equipment, trees, power lines and poles, vehicles, and other structures in its path. A total of 20 people outside a church near Jeffers were able to get inside the church just before the tornado hit, and as a result nobody suffered serious injuries.

At approximately 4:30 pm the tornado, which witnesses described as a "mass of blowing dust" or "rolling fog bank" entered Comfrey, a town of 550 people located in both Cottonwood and Brown Counties. Comfrey's fire chief saw the tornado while storm spotting and ordered the town's sirens activated. The tornado moved through the center of Comfrey one minute after the sirens went off, and destroyed a grain elevator, the town hall, three of the town's four churches, the grocery store, and most of the main street businesses downtown. The town's firehouse collapsed, and the school was heavily damaged. Of the 200 houses in the town, all but 15 suffered damage. Fifty of those homes were destroyed and as a result 100 people were left homeless. Approximately 75% of the buildings in Comfrey were damaged or destroyed.

As the tornado continued to move through Brown County it achieved F4 strength and grew to 1.25 miles (2 km) wide. Approximately 15% of the 1000 farms in Brown County sustained damage from the tornado, and 500 dairy cattle were lost. Northwest of Hanska a man was killed when the tornado caused his house to collapse. The tornado went on to cause additional damage in Blue Earth and Watonwan Counties. After traveling across six counties for 1 hour and 25 minutes and causing $75 million in damage, the tornado lifted back into the clouds at 5:15 pm 4 miles (6 km) southeast of Courtland. In addition to the one fatality,19 people were injured by this tornado.

=== St. Peter, Minnesota ===
St. Peter, Minnesota
- The tornado as it tracked through St Peter.

Meteorological history
- Date: March 29, 1998
- Formed: March 29, 1998, 5:18 p.m. EST (UTC−05:00)

F3 tornado
- on the Fujita scale
- Highest winds: 158–206 mph (254–332 km/h)

Overall effects
- Casualties: 1 fatality
- Damage: $120 million (1998 USD)

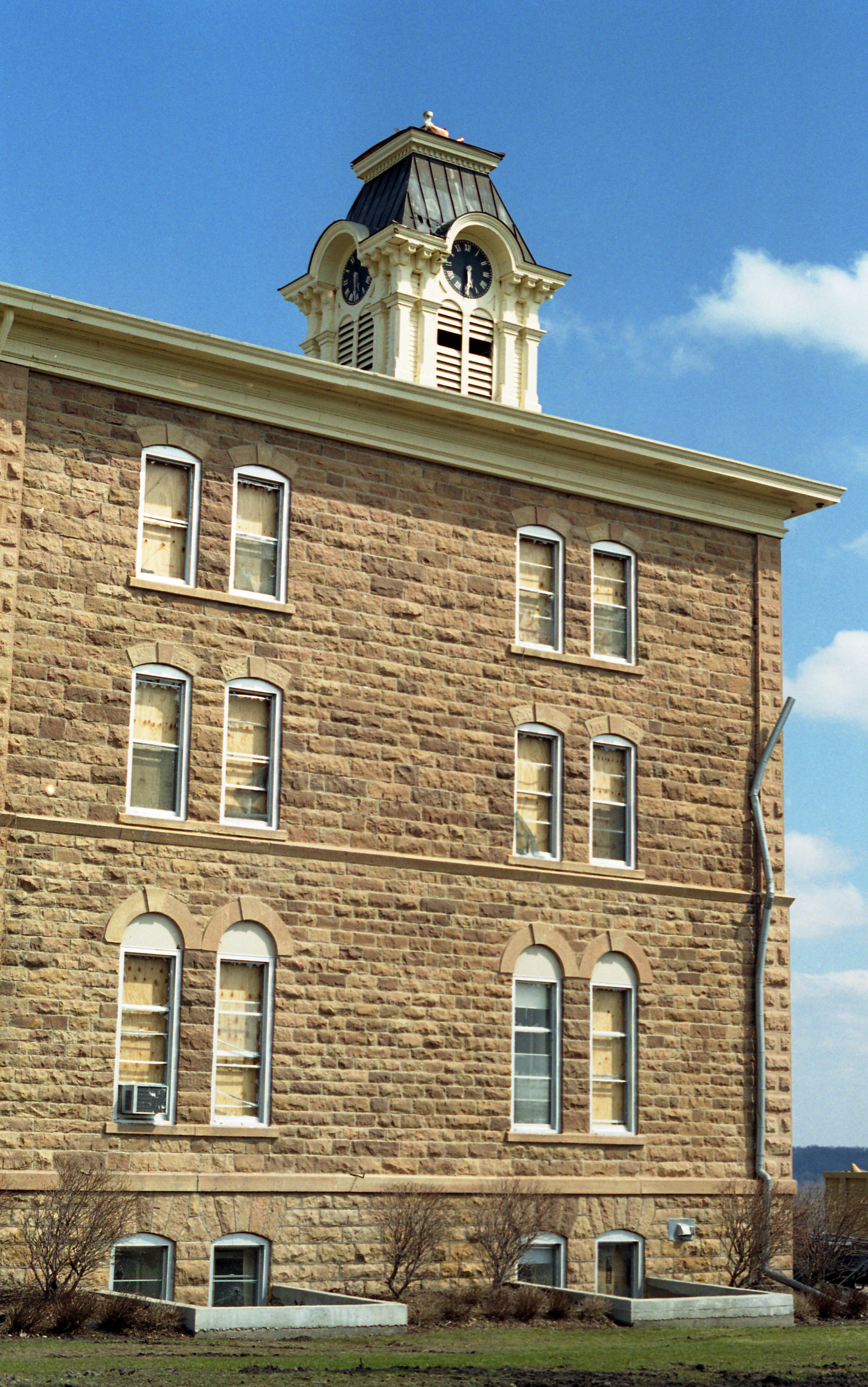
Damage at Gustavus Adolphus College

At 5:18 pm, the same supercell produced another large tornado 2 miles (3 km) to the east of Nicollet. As the tornado moved to the east, a six-year-old boy was killed when the vehicle his family was riding in was overtaken by the tornado. At 5:30 pm the F3 tornado hit St. Peter, a town of about 10,000 people located in eastern Nicollet County, and inflicted severe damage on much of the town. Gustavus Adolphus College, which sits on top of a hill on the west side of St. Peter, sustained heavy damage after taking a direct hit from the tornado. About 80% percent of the windows on the campus were shattered, and most of the major buildings on campus sustained damage. The chapel spire—a campus landmark—was snapped in half. The admissions office was destroyed, as was Johnson Hall, a small dormitory. The Lund Center for Physical Education and Health lost part of its roof, as did the tennis center. The football press box was blown from the top of the stadium bleachers, and the baseball dugouts were damaged. The tornado also uprooted more than 1000 trees, almost completely denuding the campus. Gustavus was on spring break at the time the tornado hit, so the campus was virtually vacant of students and there were no serious injuries or fatalities reported.

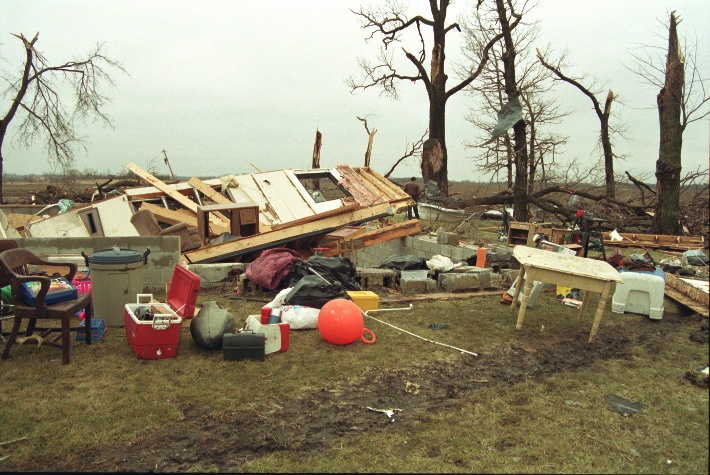
A house near St. Peter removed from its foundation.

As the tornado continued through St. Peter it caused more damage and destruction. St. Peter's Catholic Church and St. Peter Evangelical Lutheran Church were destroyed, as was the Arts and Heritage Center. The hospital was severely damaged and the library was hit, resulting in a loss of 25% of its books. Officials estimated 500 homes in St. Peter were destroyed, 1700 more were damaged and over 17,000 trees were lost. Many of the homes and trees that were destroyed in St. Peter were more than a century old. Debris from St. Peter that was sucked into the tornado fell back down to earth as far as Rice Lake, Wisconsin, over 130 miles (209 km) away. In addition to the damage in St. Peter, the tornado also damaged or destroyed 60 homes and caused $6.5 million in damage in rural areas. All together this tornado was on the ground for 18 miles (29 km) and inflicted $120 million in damage.

=== Le Center, Minnesota ===
Le Center, Minnesota
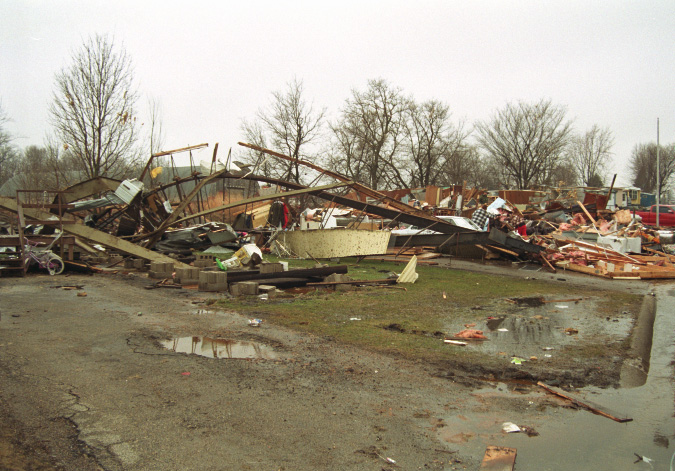
- A destroyed mobile home in LeCenter.

F2 tornado
- on the Fujita scale

Overall effects
- Casualties: 2 injuries
- Damage: $20 million (1998 USD)

Shortly after the St. Peter tornado dissipated, a new tornado formed at 5:48 pm 2 miles (3 km) north of Cleveland, Minnesota. The half-mile (.8 km) wide tornado damaged several farms before hitting Le Center at F2 strength. The tornado damaged many businesses on the southern side of town and caused heavy damage at the Le Sueur County fairgrounds. Over 100 farm buildings were destroyed as well. The Sunny Terrace mobile home park in Le Center took a direct hit from the tornado. Fifteen mobile homes were destroyed and another 26 were heavily damaged. The manager of the mobile home park was able to alert residents to the oncoming tornado, allowing most of them to take cover in a storm shelter before the storm hit. There were no fatalities from this tornado, though two people sustained injures. After traveling for 17 miles (27 km) and causing $20 million in damage, the tornado lifted from the ground 1 mile (2 km) west of the town of Montgomery.

=== Other tornadoes ===
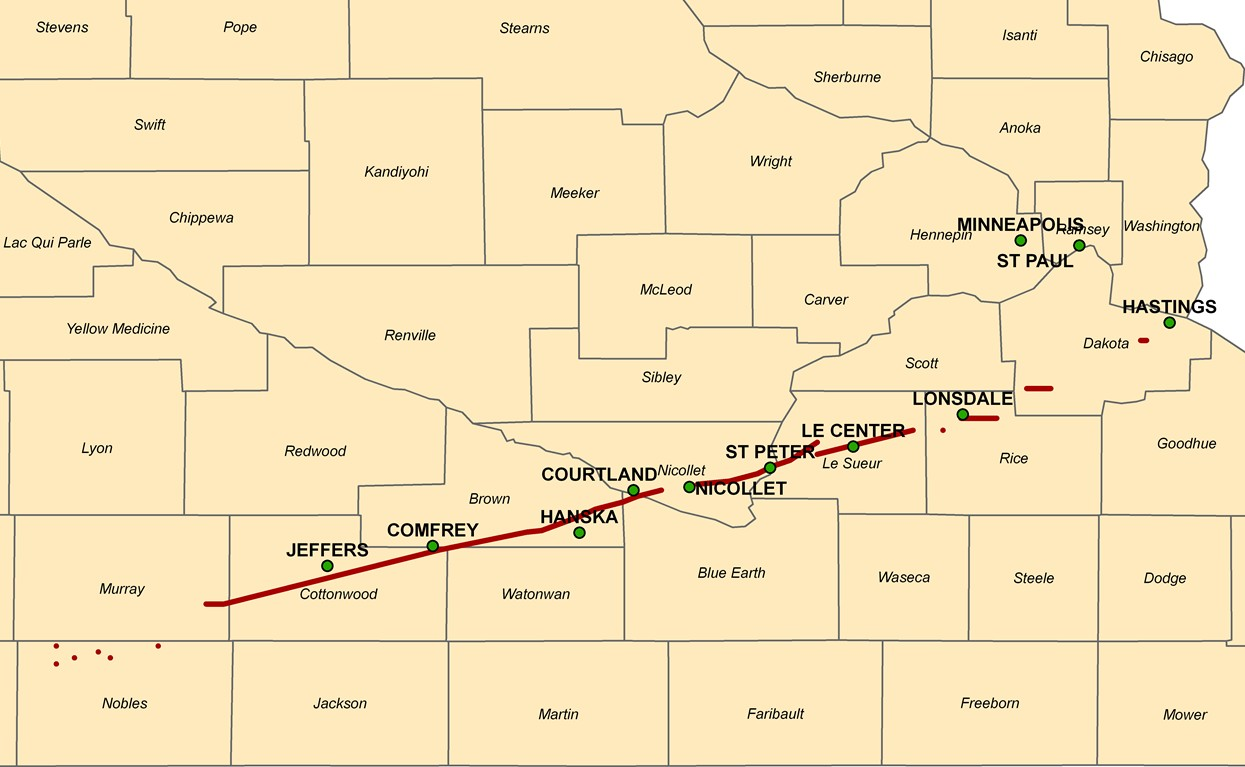
Tracks of 13 tornadoes caused by one supercell across southern Minnesota on March 29, 1998

Over the next hour, the supercell continued to track across southern Minnesota, dropping four more tornadoes in Rice and Dakota Counties. One of these tornadoes hit the town of Lonsdale at F2 strength, damaging four homes and six business in the town, and then 20 farms to the east of town. This tornado had a path of 5 miles (8 km) and caused $20 million in damage. The last of the 13 tornadoes spawned by this supercell was a brief F0 that touched down 5 miles (8 km) southwest of Hastings, and the supercell dissipated a few minutes later as it moved into Wisconsin.

Four additional tornadoes touched down this day. A tornado that was associated with the main supercell touched down briefly near Fulda, Minnesota, at 3:55 pm, while the Comfrey tornado was also on the ground. It was rated as an F1 and caused minor damage. Three other tornadoes that were all unrelated to the main supercell were confirmed as well; one in southeast Minnesota near Wabasha and two in Wisconsin. All three were rated F0 on the Fujita Scale and produced only minor damage.

== Aftermath ==
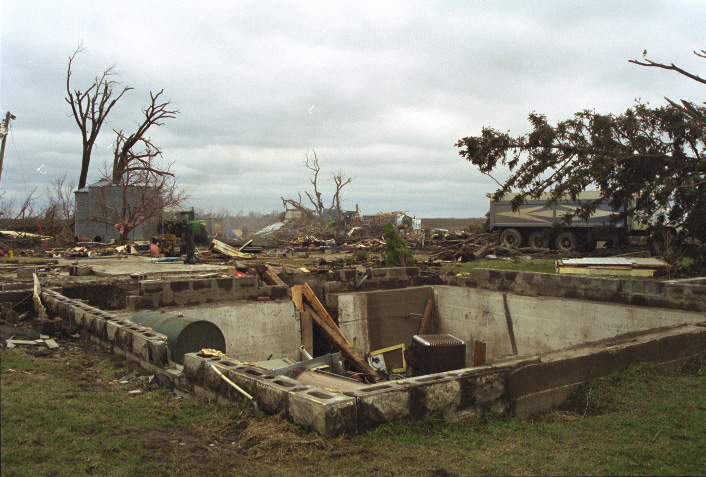
A house in rural Brown county completely swept from its foundation by the Comfrey F4 tornado

On April 1, 1998, seven counties in Minnesota were declared federal disaster areas: Brown, Le Sueur, Nicollet, Rice, Cottonwood, Blue Earth and Nobles. The money allotted from the federal government allowed the affected towns to clean up the damage and begin the rebuilding process. In addition to the federal dollars, the state of Minnesota contributed $27.6 million to the cleanup and rebuilding effort, with $1.35 million designated specifically for the preservation of the historical buildings in St. Peter. Most of St. Peter's buildings that were on the National Historic Register were damaged, but only one—a French Second Empire school building built in 1871 (St. Peter Central School)—had to be demolished. Three years after the tornado, the City of St. Peter reported that its population had grown by 2%; an unusual feat for a town that had so recently endured a natural disaster.

Damage to the Gustavus campus was estimated at nearly $60 million. Despite 33 of the 78 of the classrooms not being ready for use, the college re-opened three weeks after the tornado. Following the storm, a major concern for the college was that the student base would be eroded. To prevent that from happening, every returning and graduating student was given a $3,000 check by the college. In addition, the school sent out letters and made phone calls to all 2,000 applicants within 10 days of the disaster. The 735 new students who reported to Gustavus the following fall comprised the largest incoming class in the school's history. After a summer of repairs, the symbolic end to the rebuilding process on campus occurred on October 22, 1998, when a new 175-foot (53 m) spire was placed atop the chapel.

Following the tornado in Comfrey, residents were forced to temporarily evacuate the town due to several gas leaks, and the Minnesota National Guard was called in to help secure the area. Because the town's K–12 school was destroyed, students resumed classes two weeks later 20 miles (32 km) to the north in Sanborn. Since many Comfrey residents were displaced to nearby towns, school buses from Comfrey drove to each town to provide children transportation to the school in Sanborn. To help stock their classrooms, the school used equipment and supplies that had been salvaged from the damage as well as items that had been donated.

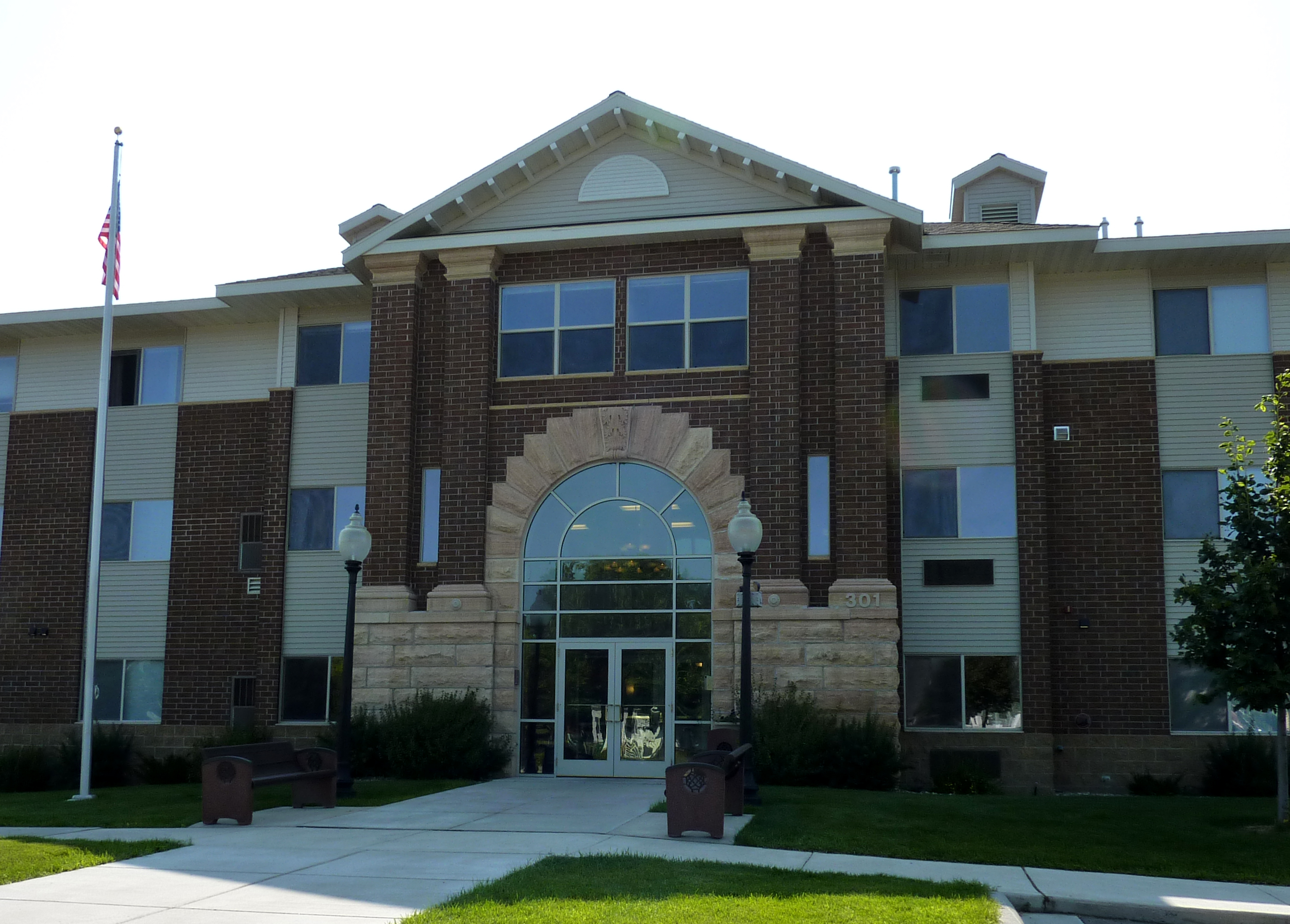
The original facade of the destroyed St. Peter Central School was worked into a contemporary apartment building constructed on the school's former site.

Immediately following the tornado in Comfrey there was uncertainty about the town's long-term survival. Then in the week following the tornado the town decided to rebuild the school, and as a result most of Comfrey's businesses decided to follow suit. Ground was broken on the new school early the next year, and it opened to students on October 4, 1999. The population of Comfrey is down to 367 from the 425 it was when the tornado hit.

Official U.S. government totals gathered in the months following the disaster state that the tornadoes caused $235 million in damage, however later estimates put the total much higher, including over $300 million in St. Peter alone. Additionally, over $800,000 in hail and downburst damage was reported over South Dakota, Minnesota and Wisconsin.

For the 13 tornadoes that touched down from the parent supercell in southern Minnesota, the Twin Cities and Sioux Falls NWS offices issued tornado warnings an average of 15 minutes before the warned areas were hit. Because of above-average lead time for the warnings, and for excellence in forecasting the entire event, a bronze medal was issued to the Twin Cities NWS office the following December by the United States Department of Commerce.

=== Impacts on Wildlife ===
The tornadoes caused injuries and deaths among local bird populations, particularly raptors. The University of Minnesota Raptor Center in St. Paul served as the primary rehabilitation facility for 25 injured eagles and hawks collected by the Minnesota Department of Natural Resources from areas near St. Peter and New Ulm.

Injuries included broken wings, frostbite, abrasions, and corneal damage from debris. Six birds were euthanized due to severe frostbite on feet and wing tips, which caused tissue loss. Rescuers attributed frostbite to low temperatures within the tornado vortex.

Veterinarians projected recovery for most birds within two to four weeks, with half suitable for release. Thousands of waterfowl died, but officials stated that populations would remain stable. The storms struck during raptor migration and nesting, which increased stress on survivors. Two weeks later, the center treated additional starving raptors.

== Historical perspective ==
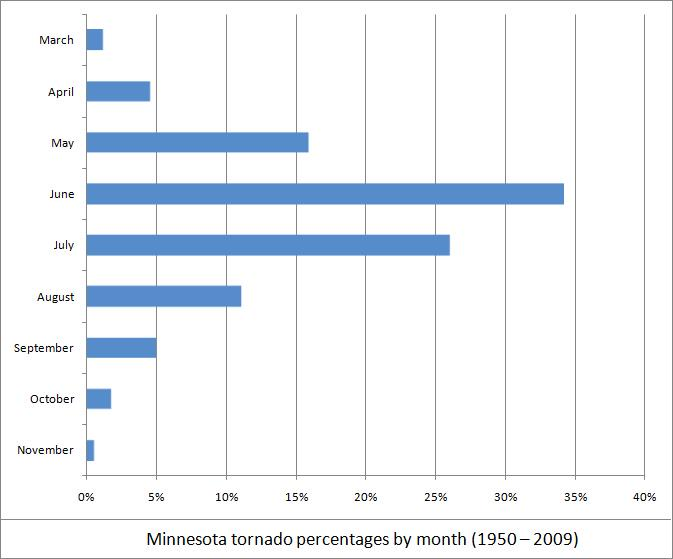
March has accounted for just 1.2% of all Minnesota tornadoes since 1950

Tornadoes during the month of March are an unusual occurrence in Minnesota when compared to the rest of the spring and summer months. Before this event there had been only six tornadoes ever recorded in the state during March, and since this event there has been only six. This outbreak also marks the first time in Minnesota history that two tornadoes were recorded on the same day in March, as well as the first time since 1921 that there have been multiple tornado fatalities on the same March day. Despite the historical significance of the outbreak, this was not the earliest calendar-year tornado to touch down in Minnesota; that record is held by three tornadoes that touched on March 6, 2017.

With a path of 67 miles (108 km), the Comfrey tornado had the fifth-longest track of any tornado on record in Minnesota. It is however the longest continuous-track tornado in Minnesota history, meaning that it was the longest to have been observed to always be in contact with the ground. The damage from the F4 tornado that struck Comfrey is the strongest ever measured in Minnesota during the month of March. The previous strongest-measured were two F3's, occurring on March 27, 1905, and March 26, 1921.

== See also ==
- Climate of Minnesota
- List of Minnesota weather records
- List of North American tornadoes and tornado outbreaks
- List of F4 and EF4 tornadoes
