= St. Kilian, Minnesota =

St Kilian
- Unincorporated community
- Coordinates: 43°47′25″N 95°52′13″W
- Country: United States
- State: Minnesota
- County: Nobles
- Elevation: 1,765 ft (538 m)
- Time zone: UTC-5 (Central (CST))
  - Summer (DST): UTC-6 (CDT)
- ZIP code: 56185
- Area code: 507
- GNIS feature ID: 654927

St. Kilian is an unincorporated community in Nobles County, Minnesota, United States.

== Geography ==
St. Kilian is an unincorporated community in section 27 of Wilmont Township. The village sits atop the Buffalo Ridge, the drainage divide between the Mississippi River and Missouri River systems. By elevation, St. Kilian is the highest population center in Nobles County. St. Kilian Catholic Church, the central feature of the village, is on the National Register of Historic Places. (Added 1998 - Building - #97001425).

== History ==
Wilmont Township was founded largely by German-Catholic farmers. In 1887, in an effort to serve the large number of Catholics in the vicinity, St. Kilian Catholic Church was built under the leadership of Father C. J. Knauf of Adrian. Saint Kilian, the namesake of the church, was an Irish missionary who worked in Bavaria towards the end of the 7th century.

Within two years, John Mock and John Meyer each opened general stores near the church, and Andrew Pacholl opened a blacksmith shop. Shortly thereafter, Hub Pass and Joseph Buddle both opened saloons. The town was named St. Kilian, after the church, and for some time, the town was the largest population center in Wilmont Township. The town was surveyed in October 1891, and the plat was filed on December 10, 1891. The original church building burned in 1897, and as St. Killian appeared to have a bright future, a replacement church was built. This building was completed in 1900 and still serves the Catholic community of the St. Killian vicinity. It is currently on the National Register of Historic Places (Building #97001425)

In 1899, a railroad finally came to Wilmont Township. But this railroad, the Burlington Northern, bypassed St. Kilian. Railroad officials instead established the nearby town of Wilmont as a business hub, and the importance of St. Killian began to fade. Indeed, a number of St. Kilian's buildings were picked up and moved cross-country to the new Wilmont townsite. St. Killian's post office was closed in March 1907. St. Killian Catholic Church remains open and active, but other businesses in the village long ago closed their doors.

== Politics ==
St. Kilian is located in Minnesota's 1st congressional district, represented by Mankato educator Tim Walz, a Democrat. At the state level, St. Kilian is located in Senate District 22, represented by Republican Doug Magnus, and in House District 22A, represented by Republican Joe Schomacker.
