= Reading, Minnesota =

Reading
- Unincorporated community
- Interactive map of Reading
- Coordinates: 43°42′13″N 95°42′47″W
- Country: United States
- State: Minnesota
- County: Nobles
- Elevation: 1,703 ft (519 m)
- Time zone: UTC-6 (Central (CST))
  - Summer (DST): UTC-5 (CDT)
- ZIP code: 56165
- Area code: 507
- GNIS feature ID: 649856

Reading is an unincorporated community in Nobles County, Minnesota, United States.

== Geography ==
Reading is 7.5 miles (12.1 km) northwest of Worthington. According to A.P Rose's History of Nobles County, Reading is nearer to the geographic center of the county than any other community. Reading has a post office with ZIP code 56165.

Main highways include:

- Minnesota State Highway 266 Discontinued in 2003 – renamed Nobles County Road 25
- Nobles County Road 25

== History ==
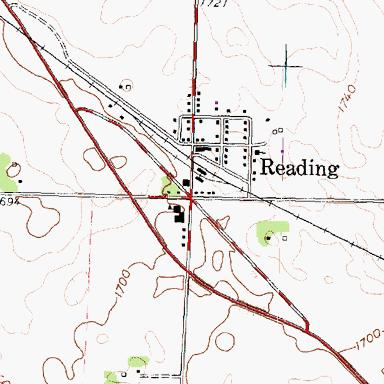
Topographic map of Reading before removal of the Rock Island Railroad tracks

Main Street of Reading, Minnesota, from postcard dated 1910

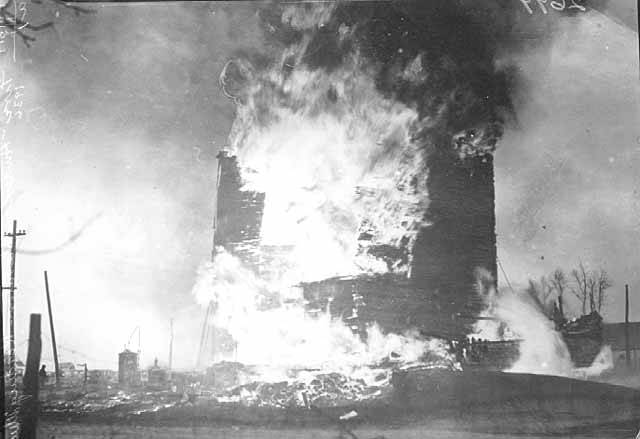
Fire that destroyed the Anderson Elevator in 1936

=== Founding of Reading ===
Much of the land that the community of Reading now occupies was claimed by H.H. Read in 1876. He farmed the land for 23 years until the Burlington, Cedar Rapids and Northern Railway arrived in 1899. Thomas H. Brown, Burlington's right-of-way man, purchased 27 1/2 acres of land from Read for the purpose of establishing a townsite. He also purchased 20 more acres from Worthington banker and real estate dealer George Dayton. Dayton later went on to found the Dayton's Department Store chain. In the fall of 1899, A. J. Keller arrived on the first train and took up his duties as station agent. Early in 1900, H. H. Douglas and the Rothchild Grain Company both built grain elevators in Reading after flipping a coin to determine location. Coal and lumber yards were quickly established by James S Ramage. By the time the town was surveyed and platted in the summer of 1900, a general store, a hardware store, a blacksmith shop, and a restaurant had been added to Reading's list of businesses. The Summit Lake Presbyterian Church was moved into town from the country, and a small school house was also moved into town to educate the youth of Reading. The Reading State Bank was established in 1902. The Farmer's Mutual Telephone Company was established in 1905 with lines connecting to Rushmore, Wilmont, and Fulda.

=== Later history ===
The Burlington Railroad was later taken over by the Rock Island Railroad, and operated until the 1970s. In the 1980s, the line was abandoned and the tracks were torn up. Minnesota State Highway 266 was constructed in 1949, connecting Worthington, Reading, and Wilmont. The State of Minnesota maintained the highway for 50 years, but responsibility for upkeep was transferred to Nobles County in 2003. It has been renamed Nobles County Road 25.

== Politics ==
Reading is located in Minnesota's 1st congressional district, represented by Blue Earth native Jim Hagedorn, a Republican. At the state level, Reading is located in Senate District 22, represented by Republican Bill Weber, and in House District 22A, represented by Republican Joe Schomacker.

== Local politics ==
Reading is located in Summit Lake Township and is represented by Nobles County Commissioner Justin Ahlers.

== See also ==
- Unincorporated communities in Minnesota
