= Wilmon =

Wilmon is a male given name. Notable people with the name include:

- Wilmon W. Blackmar (1841–1905), United States military officer
- Wilmon Brewer (1895–1998), American literary scholar, poet, and philanthropist
- Wilmon Newell (1878–1943), American entomologist
- Wilmon Henry Sheldon (1875–1981), American philosopher

== See also ==
- Wilmont (disambiguation)
