= Church of St. Adrian–Catholic =

Historic church in Minnesota, United States

- Church of St. Adrian--Catholic
- U.S. National Register of Historic Places
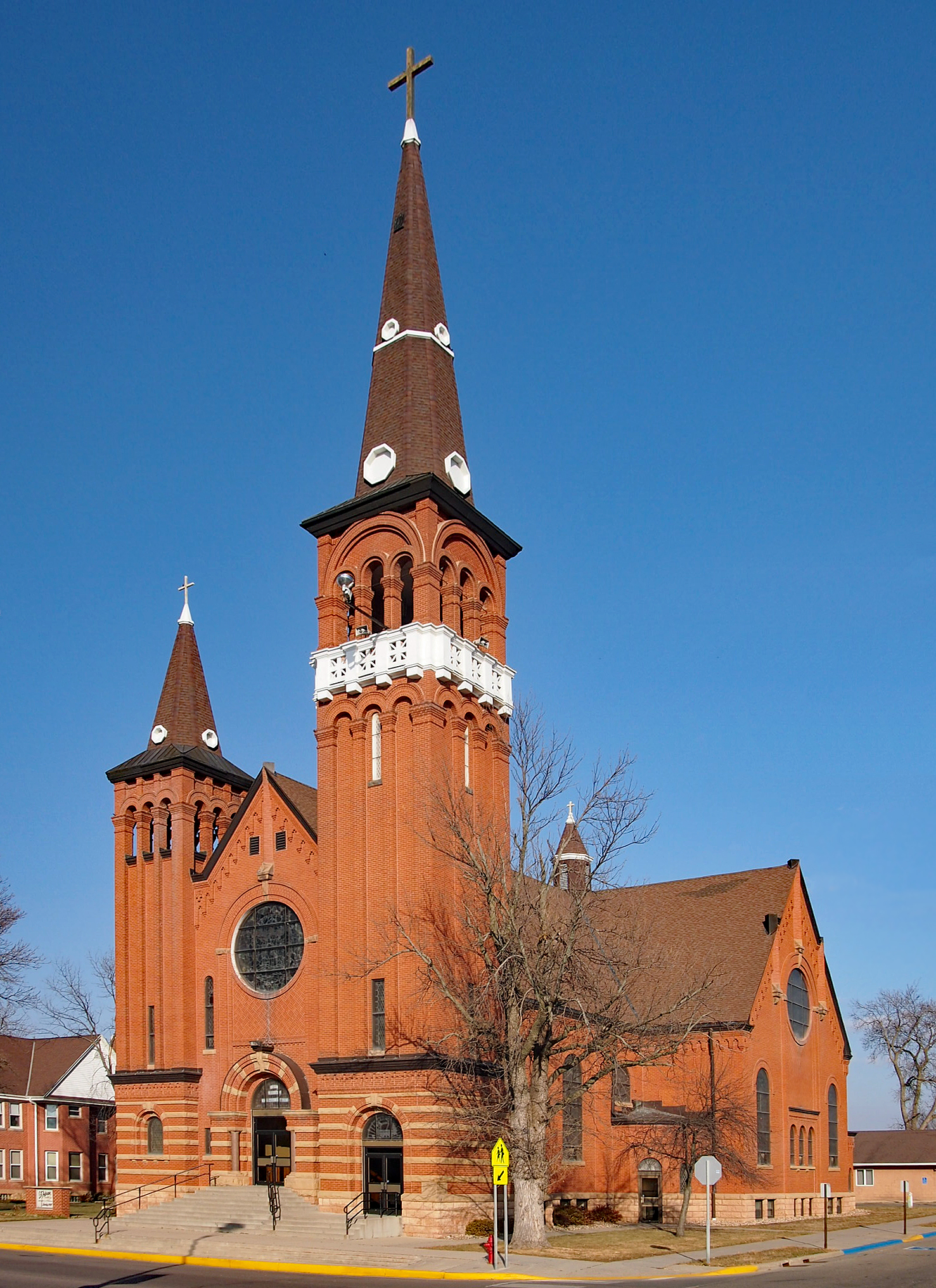

- Location within Minnesota Location within the United States
- Location: Main and Church Sts., Adrian, Minnesota
- Coordinates: 43°37′58″N 95°55′58″W
- Area: less than one acre
- Built: 1900
- Architect: Foeller, Henry
- Architectural style: Romanesque
- MPS: Nobles County MRA
- NRHP reference No.: 80002094
- Added to NRHP: May 15, 1980

Church of St. Adrian–Catholic is a historic church building at Main and Church Streets in Adrian, Minnesota, United States.

Bishop John Ireland was noticing the development of the southwestern Minnesota prairie land in the late 1870s. He directed Mayor Ben Thompson to scout out sites in the area. In 1877, the bishop established a new parish in Adrian, which at the time had only three houses, two stores, one hotel, a wayside station, and only one practicing Catholic. The new parish was presided over by Father C. J. Knauf and named after Saint Adrian the warrior. The first building was a wood-framed building, built in 1878 at a cost of $700. In 1887, a brick-veneered building was built, but it was destroyed by a fire on December 24, 1899. $30,000 was raised toward the cost of a new church, whose cornerstone was laid on July 4, 1900. The congregation started worshiping in the new church the following year. The building was listed on the National Register of Historic Places in 1980. The parish is now part of a four-parish cluster with Church of St. Kilian in Wilmont Township, St. Anthony in Lismore, and Our Lady of Good Counsel in Wilmont.
