= Wilmont =

Wilmont may refer to several location in the United States:

- Wilmont, Delaware
- Wilmont, Minnesota
- Wilmont Township, Nobles County, Minnesota
- Wilmont, Roanoke, Virginia
