= Cedric Adams =

American broadcaster

- Born: May 27, 1902; Adrian, Minnesota, US
- Died: February 18, 1961 (aged 58); Minneapolis Minnesota, US
- Education: University of Minnesota
- Occupation: Reporter/Radio Personality
- Known for: Broadcast celebrity in the Mid-west
- Spouse: Bernice Lenont
- Children: 3, including Stephen

Cedric Adams (May 27, 1902 – February 18, 1961) was an American broadcaster, well known in the Midwestern United States from the 1930s until his death. He was inducted into the Pavek Museum of Broadcasting's Hall of Fame in 2002. Throughout the 1930s, 1940s, and 1950s, Adams was the "best known voice" in the upper Midwest.

== Personal ==
Adams was born in Adrian, Minnesota, and raised in Magnolia. He attended Central High School in Minneapolis and the University of Minnesota, where he wrote for the Minnesota Daily newspaper.

== Career ==
Adams began his career in radio in 1931 where he played a small dramatic role on WCCO Minneapolis/Saint Paul. His first newscast for WCCO was made in September 1934. He later reported the news and hosted programs such as "Stairway to Stardom", "The Phillips 66 Talent Parade", and "Dinner at the Adams'", while at the same time contenting to write for his daily newspaper column and performing for 20 radio shows each week.

On January 2, 1950, Adams began a five-minute Monday-Friday commentary on CBS radio.

== Personal life and death ==
Adams married Berniece Lemont in 1931, and they had three sons. He died on February 18, 1961, at the age of 58.

He was buried in Lakewood Cemetery on February 21, 1961.
