= Slade Hotel =

- U.S. National Register of Historic Places
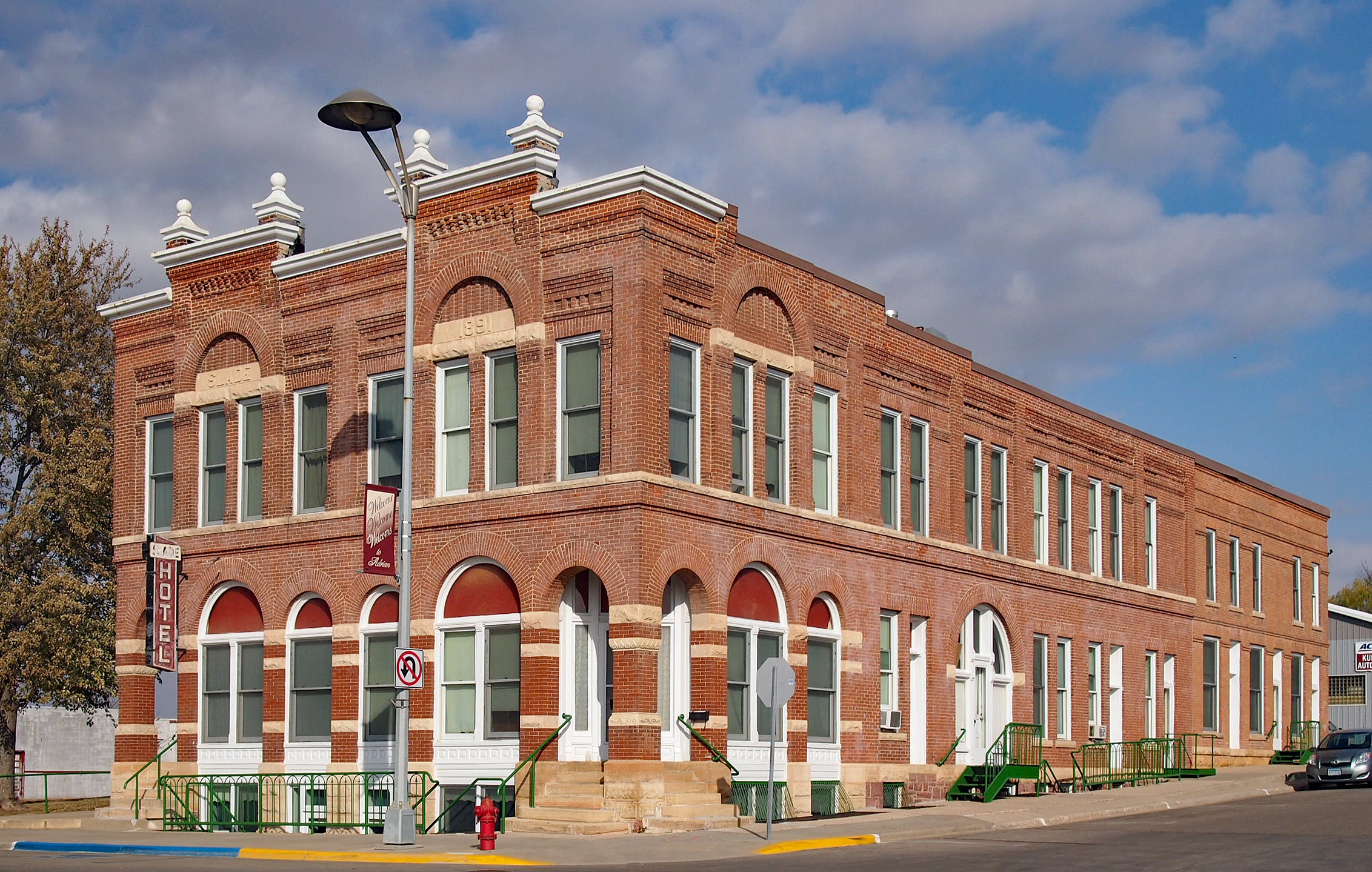

- Location within Minnesota Location within the United States
- Location: 116 2nd Street E, Adrian, Minnesota
- Coordinates: 43°38′13″N 95°55′58″W
- Area: less than one acre
- Built: 1891
- Architectural style: Late Victorian, Late Victorian commercial
- MPS: Nobles County MRA (AD)
- NRHP reference No.: 75000999
- Added to NRHP: June 30, 1975

The Slade Hotel, built in 1891 in Adrian, Minnesota, United States, is an example of Late Victorian architecture. Its historic qualities were recognized by listing of the structure on the National Register of Historic Places in 1975.

In the 1990s the structure was examined and a recommendation was made for demolition. Instead, it was converted into senior housing according to plans by Oertel Architects of St. Paul, Minnesota. Although hotel rooms were combined into apartments, HVAC systems were upgraded or replaced, and other changes were made in the 1997 renovation, it preserved its historic character and designation.

The Slade Hotel was the Minnesota Brick Structure of the Month for September 2010.
