= Minnesota State Highway 266 =

State highway in Minnesota, United States

Trunk Highway 266
- MN 266 highlighted in red

Route information
- Maintained by MnDOT
- Length: 13.860 mi (22.306 km)
- Existed: July 1, 1949–2003

Major junctions
- West end: CSAH 29 in Wilmont
- East end: I-90 in Worthington

Location
- Country: United States
- State: Minnesota

Highway system
- Minnesota Trunk Highway System; Interstate; US; State; Legislative; Scenic
← MN 261	→ MN 269

Minnesota State Highway 266 (MN 266) was a 13.860-mile-long (22.306 km) highway in southwest Minnesota that had connected the communities of Wilmont and Reading to the city of Worthington. It was decommissioned in 2004, and was renumbered Nobles County State-Aid Highway 25.

== Route description ==
Highway 266 was a northwest–southeast route connecting Wilmont and Reading to Interstate 90 on the northern border of the city of Worthington. The entire route was located in Nobles County in southwest Minnesota.

The roadway was legally defined as Legislative Route 266 in the Minnesota Statutes § 161.115(197).

The route had followed 7th Street in Wilmont and 160th Street in Larkin Township.

== History ==
Highway 266 was authorized on July 1, 1949. The route was removed from the state highway system in 2003.

The roadway was paved between Reading and Worthington at the time it was marked. The remainder was paved in 1950. It originally terminated at U.S. Highway 16 (now County State-Aid Highway 35) until that part of it was replaced by Interstate 90 in 1969. It then ran into Worthington city proper along Diagonal Road, terminating at U.S. 59 / State Highway 60. It was shortened to end at I-90 in the late 1980s.

== Major intersections ==
The entire highway was in Nobles County.

Location	mi	km	Destinations	Notes
Wilmont	0.000	0.000	CSAH 16 (7th Street) / CSAH 29 (4th Avenue)	Road continued as CSAH 16
Wilmont–Bloom township line	0.749	1.205	CSAH 13 north (Hesselroth Avenue) – Iona	
Summit Lake Township	1.731	2.786	CSAH 13 south (Jones Avenue) / CSAH 16 east (160th Street)	
Reading	7.270	11.700	CSAH 14 (200th Street) – Reading	
Reading	7.497	12.065	CSAH 9 (McCall Avenue)	
Worthington Township	11.628	18.713	CSAH 7 (Oliver Avenue)	
Worthington	13.700– 13.860	22.048– 22.306	I-90 – Jackson, Luverne	
1.000 mi = 1.609 km; 1.000 km = 0.621 mi
