= Church of St. Kilian (Catholic) =

Historic church in Minnesota, United States

- U.S. National Register of Historic Places
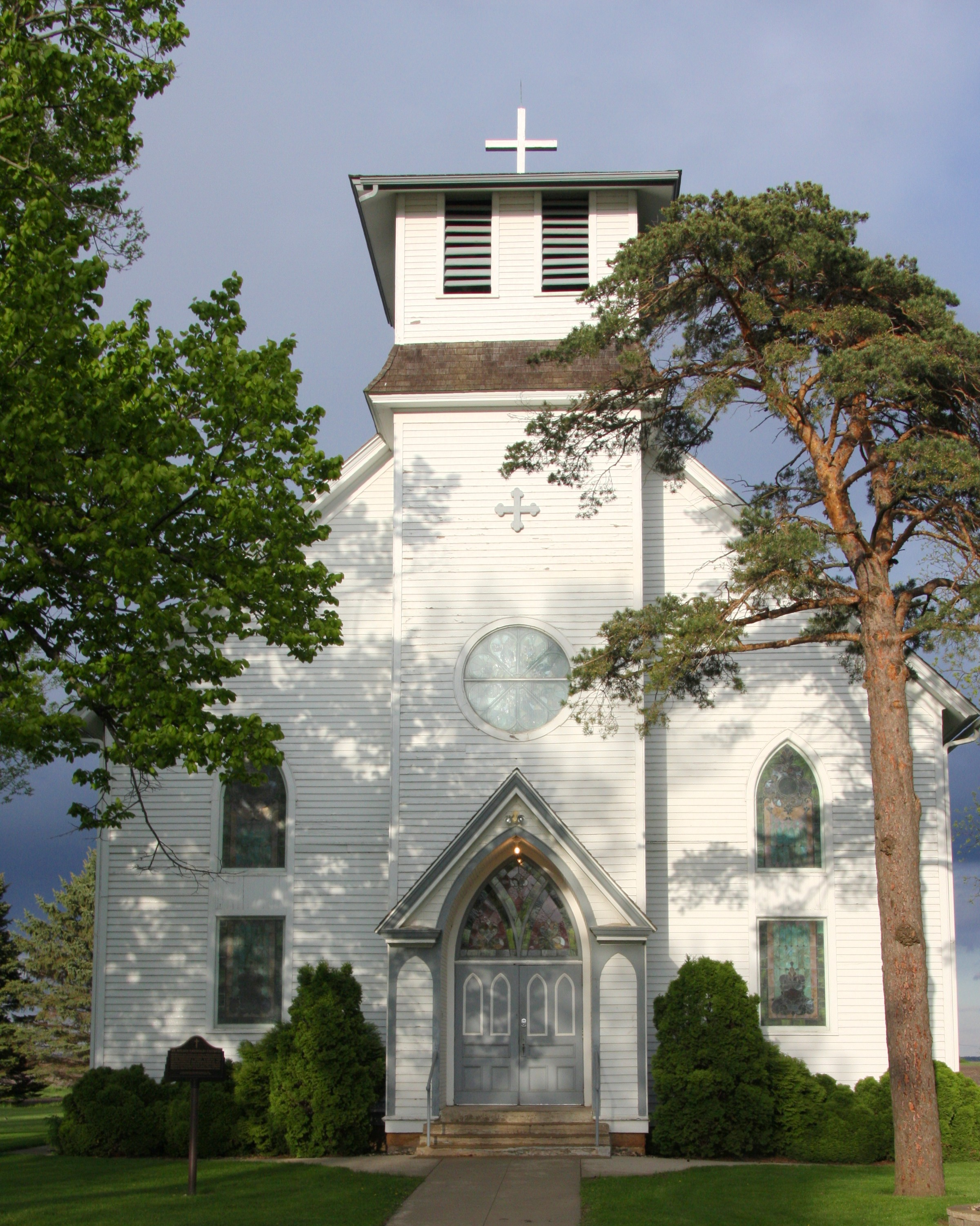
- St. Kilian Catholic Church from the west

- Location within Minnesota Location within the United States
- Nearest city: Wilmont Township, Minnesota
- Coordinates: 43°47′20″N 95°52′6″W
- Area: 14.7 acres (5.9 ha)
- Built: 1900
- Architect: Yeub, H.
- Architectural style: Gothic, Late Victorian
- NRHP reference No.: 97001425
- Added to NRHP: March 30, 1998

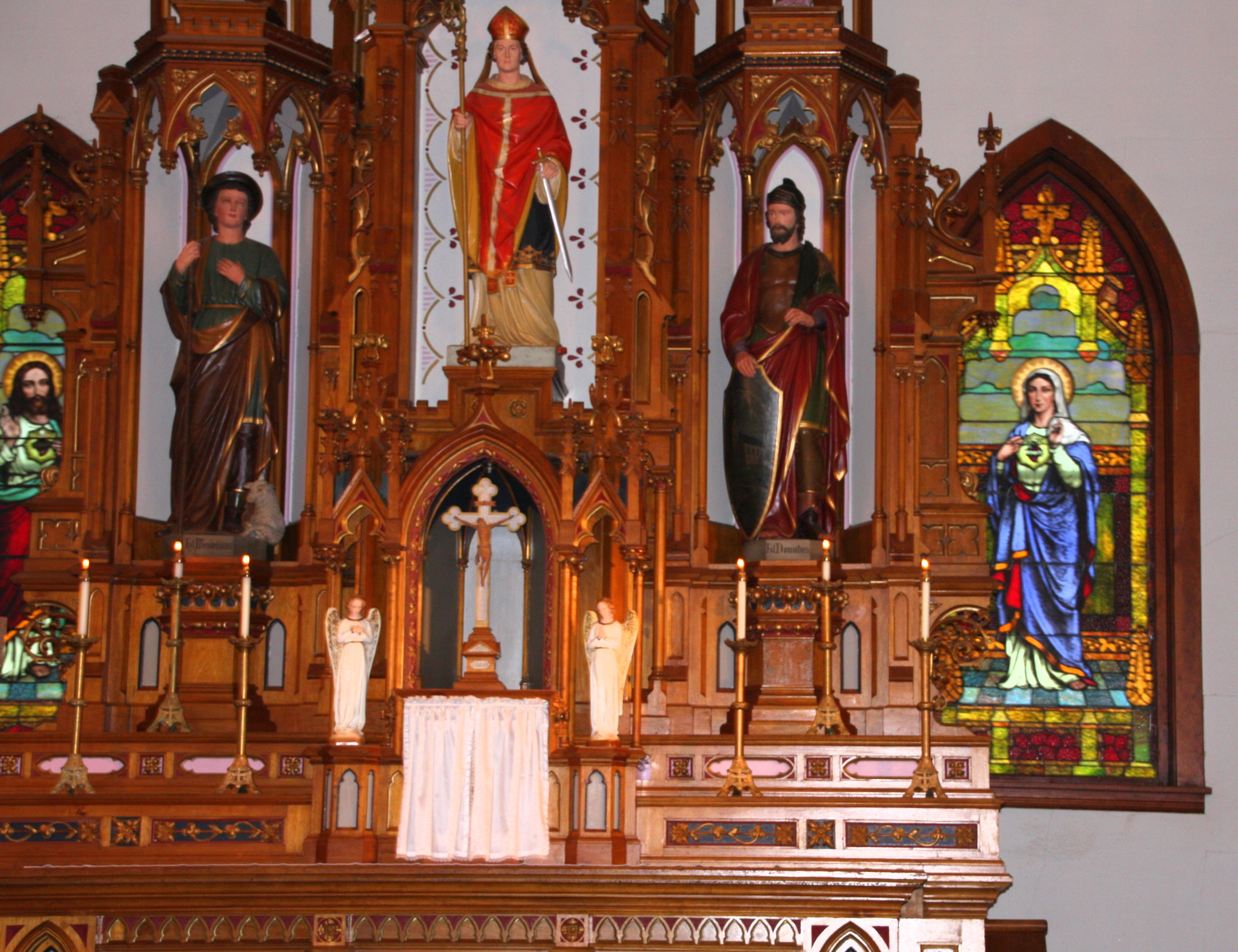
The church's altar

Church of St. Kilian (Catholic) is a historic Roman Catholic church in Wilmont Township, Minnesota, USA. The parish was founded in 1878, when the priest of Church of St. Adrian recognized the increasing number of settlers in the area. The church building was built in 1900.

The building was added to the National Register of Historic Places in 1998. The parish was part of a four-parish cluster with St. Adrian, St. Anthony in Lismore and Our Lady of Good Counsel in Wilmont. In 2017, it became an oratory.

== History ==
The parish of St. Killian was founded in 1878 when the priest of St. Adrian purchased land north of the existing parish to cater to the growing numbers of immigrant German Catholics coming to Nobles County, Minnesota. The Bishop of Saint Paul's, John Ireland supported the move and helped erect the first dedicated church of St. Killian in 1887 after they had previously been worshipping in the local school. After a lightning strike in 1898 destroyed the church, a new one was constructed on its site and completed in 1900. Despite a push for Catholics in Minnesota to use English following anti-German sentiment during the First World War, St. Killian continued to operate in German until 1957 when the last confession in German was heard wherein the church then solely used English.

== Design ==
The church was constructed in Germanic Victorian Gothic style, designed to evoke the style of older churches in Germany. The exterior was originally multicolored with a white trim, but was later whitewashed to make it all-white.
