= Courtland, Minnesota =

City in Minnesota, United States

Courtland
- City
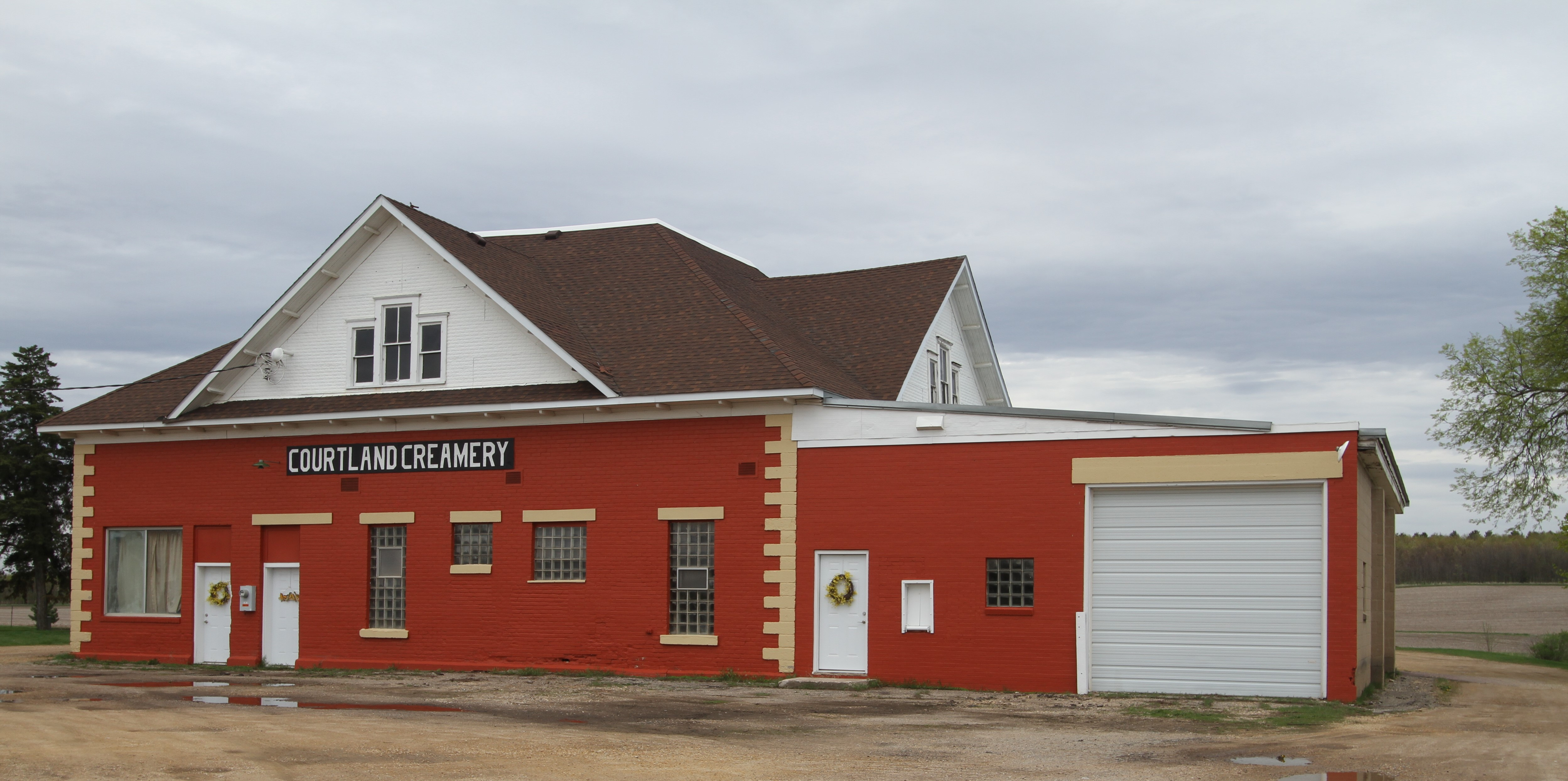
- Courtland Creamery
- Motto: "A Great Place To Call Home"
- Location of Courtland, Minnesota
- Coordinates: 44°16′12″N 94°20′47″W
- Country: United States
- State: Minnesota
- County: Nicollet

Government
  - Type: Mayor – Council
  - Mayor: Allen Poehler

Area
  - Total: 2.62 sq mi (6.78 km^{2})
  - Land: 2.61 sq mi (6.76 km^{2})
  - Water: 0.0077 sq mi (0.02 km^{2})
- Elevation: 938 ft (286 m)

Population (2020)
  - Total: 734
  - Density: 281.1/sq mi (108.52/km^{2})
- Time zone: UTC-6 (Central (CST))
  - Summer (DST): UTC-5 (CDT)
- ZIP code: 56021
- Area code: 507
- FIPS code: 27-13582
- GNIS feature ID: 2393654
- Website: cityofcourtland.com

Courtland is a city in Nicollet County, Minnesota, United States. The population was 734 at the 2020 census. It is part of the Mankato-North Mankato Metropolitan Statistical Area.

== History ==
The place occupied by the current town was named Courtland in 1865, but was previously named Hilo. Courtland was platted in 1882. There are conflicting records for the origin of the name. According to Bryant (1882) the city was named for Cortland County, New York and not spelled the same; however, Stennett (1908) suggests it is named after Courland, a once-Germanized region of present-day Latvia by an emigrant, J.H. Stewart, and was accidentally misspelled on the official record.

== Geography ==
According to the U.S. Census Bureau, the city has a total area of 2.64 square miles (6.84 km^{2}), all land.

== Demographics ==
Historical population
Census	Pop.	Note	%±
1900	174		—
1910	208		19.5%
1920	224		7.7%
1930	260		16.1%
1940	291		11.9%
1950	251		−13.7%
1960	239		−4.8%
1970	300		25.5%
1980	399		33.0%
1990	412		3.3%
2000	538		30.6%
2010	611		13.6%
2020	734		20.1%
U.S. Decennial Census; 2020 Census

=== 2010 census ===
As of the census of 2010, there were 611 people, 237 households, and 176 families living in the city. The population density was 231.4 inhabitants per square mile (89.3/km^{2}). There were 251 housing units at an average density of 95.1 per square mile (36.7/km^{2}). The racial makeup of the city was 99.0% White, 0.2% African American, 0.7% Asian, and 0.2% from two or more races. Hispanic or Latino of any race were 0.7% of the population.

There were 237 households, of which 34.2% had children under the age of 18 living with them, 67.1% were married couples living together, 3.8% had a female householder with no husband present, 3.4% had a male householder with no wife present, and 25.7% were non-families. 19.4% of all households were made up of individuals, and 4.2% had someone living alone who was 65 years of age or older. The average household size was 2.58 and the average family size was 2.96.

The median age in the city was 37.7 years. 24.4% of residents were under the age of 18; 5.8% were between the ages of 18 and 24; 30.3% were from 25 to 44; 30.3% were from 45 to 64; and 9.3% were 65 years of age or older. The gender makeup of the city was 50.6% male and 49.4% female.

=== 2000 census ===
As of the census of 2000, there were 538 people, 188 households, and 150 families living in the city. The population density was 202.5 inhabitants per square mile (78.2/km^{2}). There were 190 housing units at an average density of 71.5 per square mile (27.6/km^{2}). The racial makeup of the city was 98.51% White, 1.12% Asian, 0.37% from other races. Hispanic or Latino of any race were 0.56% of the population.

There were 188 households, out of which 45.2% had children under the age of 18 living with them, 70.2% were married couples living together, 7.4% had a female householder with no husband present, and 20.2% were non-families. 17.0% of all households were made up of individuals, and 8.0% had someone living alone who was 65 years of age or older. The average household size was 2.86 and the average family size was 3.25.

In the city, the population was spread out, with 31.6% under the age of 18, 6.3% from 18 to 24, 31.2% from 25 to 44, 24.3% from 45 to 64, and 6.5% who were 65 years of age or older. The median age was 35 years. For every 100 females, there were 100.7 males. For every 100 females age 18 and over, there were 91.7 males.

The median income for a household in the city was $58,906, and the median income for a family was $66,184. Males had a median income of $40,000 versus $30,461 for females. The per capita income for the city was $23,267. About 1.4% of families and 2.6% of the population were below the poverty line, including 2.9% of those under age 18 and 10.5% of those age 65 or over.
