= Wilmont Township, Nobles County, Minnesota =

Wilmont Township, Minnesota
- Township
- Location within the state of Minnesota Wilmont Township, Minnesota (the United States)
- Coordinates: 43°48′44″N 95°52′58″W
- Country: United States
- State: Minnesota
- County: Nobles

Area
  - Total: 35.5 sq mi (92.0 km^{2})
  - Land: 35.5 sq mi (92.0 km^{2})
  - Water: 0 sq mi (0.0 km^{2})
- Elevation: 1,759 ft (536 m)

Population (2000)
  - Total: 228
  - Density: 6.5/sq mi (2.5/km^{2})
- Time zone: UTC−6 (Central (CST))
  - Summer (DST): UTC−5 (CDT)
- ZIP Code: 56185
- Area code: 507
- FIPS code: 27-70600
- GNIS feature ID: 0666007

Wilmont Township is a township in Nobles County, Minnesota, United States. The population was 228 at the 2000 census.

== Geography ==
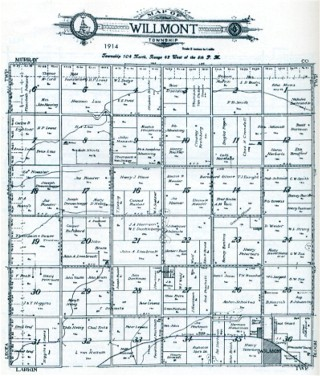
Map of Wilmont Township, 1914—note double L in spelling of Wilmont

1882 Map of Nobles County—again, note double L in spelling of Wilmont Township

According to the United States Census Bureau, the township has a total area of 35.5 square miles (92.0 km²), all land. The main geographic feature of Wilmont Township is the Buffalo Ridge, a drainage divide separating the Mississippi River and Missouri River systems.

Main highways include:

- Minnesota State Highway 91
- Minnesota State Highway 266 (Nobles County 25)
- Nobles County Road 13
- Nobles County Road 16

== History ==
Organization of Willmont Township (note the double-L) was approved by the Nobles County Board on November 12, 1878. There was a general disagreement over the township name, one faction wishing to call it Willumet, and the other favoring Lamont. On November 22, 1878, a compromise was reached, and the township was formally named Willmont. When the town of Wilmont was established in 1899, one L was dropped to distinguish it from Willmont Township. Somewhere along the line, the township name was also changed to Wilmont (single-L). The reason for this change remains obscure.

== Demographics ==
As of the census of 2000, there were 228 people, 80 households, and 67 families residing in the township. The population density was 6.4 people per square mile (2.5/km^{2}). There were 86 housing units at an average density of 2.4/sq mi (0.9/km^{2}). The racial makeup of the township was 97.37% White, 2.19% Asian, and 0.44% from two or more races.

There were 80 households, out of which 32.5% had children under the age of 18 living with them, 71.3% were married couples living together, 6.3% had a female householder with no husband present, and 16.3% were non-families. Of all households 15.0% were made up of individuals, and 7.5% had someone living alone who was 65 years of age or older. The average household size was 2.85 and the average family size was 3.18.

In the township the population was spread out, with 27.6% under the age of 18, 6.6% from 18 to 24, 25.9% from 25 to 44, 23.2% from 45 to 64, and 16.7% who were 65 years of age or older. The median age was 40 years. For every 100 females, there were 94.9 males. For every 100 females age 18 and over, there were 103.7 males.

The median income for a household in the township was $31,528, and the median income for a family was $33,125. Males had a median income of $24,375 versus $18,750 for females. The per capita income for the township was $12,613. About 9.0% of families and 12.9% of the population were below the poverty line, including 25.4% of those under the age of eighteen and 11.8% of those 65 or over.

== Politics ==
Wilmont Township is located in Minnesota's 1st congressional district, represented by Mankato educator Tim Walz, a Democrat. At the state level, Wilmont Township is located in Senate District 22, represented by Republican Doug Magnus, and in House District 22A, represented by Republican Joe Schomacker.

== Local politics ==
Wilmont Township is represented by Nobles County Commissioner Gene Metz.
