= Adrian, Minnesota =

City in Minnesota, United States

- City
- Location of Adrian, Minnesota
- Coordinates: 43°37′59″N 95°55′59″W
- Country: United States
- State: Minnesota
- County: Nobles

Government
  - Type: Mayor - Council
  - Mayor: David Edwards

Area
  - Total: 1.17 sq mi (3.03 km^{2})
  - Land: 1.17 sq mi (3.03 km^{2})
  - Water: 0 sq mi (0.00 km^{2})
- Elevation: 1,552 ft (473 m)

Population (2020)
  - Total: 1,194
  - Density: 1,021.7/sq mi (394.47/km^{2})
- Time zone: UTC-6 (Central (CST))
  - Summer (DST): UTC-5 (CDT)
- ZIP code: 56110
- Area code: 507
- FIPS code: 27-00262
- GNIS feature ID: 2393884
- Website: www.adrian.govoffice2.com

Adrian is a city in Nobles County, Minnesota, United States. As of the 2020 census, Adrian had a population of 1,194.

== Geography ==
According to the United States Census Bureau, the city has a total area of 1.11 square miles (2.87 km^{2}), all land.

Main highways include:

- Interstate 90
- Minnesota State Highway 91
- Nobles County Road 35

== Demographics ==
Historical population
Census	Pop.	Note	%±
1880	193		—
1890	671		247.7%
1900	1,258		87.5%
1910	1,112		−11.6%
1920	1,087		−2.2%
1930	1,000		−8.0%
1940	1,066		6.6%
1950	1,115		4.6%
1960	1,215		9.0%
1970	1,350		11.1%
1980	1,336		−1.0%
1990	1,141		−14.6%
2000	1,234		8.2%
2010	1,209		−2.0%
2020	1,194		−1.2%
U.S. Decennial Census

=== 2010 census ===
As of the census of 2010, there were 1,209 people, 491 households, and 333 families residing in the city. The population density was 1,089.2 inhabitants per square mile (420.5/km^{2}). There were 537 housing units at an average density of 483.8 per square mile (186.8/km^{2}). The racial makeup of the city was 95.3% White, 0.4% African American, 1.2% Asian, 1.1% from other races, and 2.1% from two or more races. Hispanic or Latino of any race were 4.1% of the population.

There were 491 households, of which 29.3% had children under the age of 18 living with them, 56.4% were married couples living together, 7.3% had a female householder with no husband present, 4.1% had a male householder with no wife present, and 32.2% were non-families. 28.1% of all households were made up of individuals, and 12.6% had someone living alone who was 65 years of age or older. The average household size was 2.41 and the average family size was 2.94.

The median age in the city was 42.6 years. 25.1% of residents were under the age of 18; 6.8% were between the ages of 18 and 24; 21.7% were from 25 to 44; 28.2% were from 45 to 64; and 18.2% were 65 years of age or older. The gender makeup of the city was 49.0% male and 51.0% female.

=== 2000 census ===
As of the census of 2000, there were 1,234 people, 493 households, and 330 families residing in the city. The population density was 1,111.5 inhabitants per square mile (429.2/km^{2}). There were 527 housing units at an average density of 474.7 per square mile (183.3/km^{2}). The racial makeup of the city was 96.43% White, 0.24% African American, 0.32% Asian, 1.94% from other races, and 1.05% from two or more races. Hispanic or Latino of any race were 2.92% of the population.

There were 493 households, out of which 30.4% had children under the age of 18 living with them, 57.4% were married couples living together, 6.9% had a female householder with no husband present, and 32.9% were non-families. 30.6% of all households were made up of individuals, and 17.2% had someone living alone who was 65 years of age or older. The average household size was 2.40 and the average family size was 3.01.

In the city, the population was spread out, with 25.3% under the age of 18, 5.8% from 18 to 24, 25.2% from 25 to 44, 21.2% from 45 to 64, and 22.4% who were 65 years of age or older. The median age was 40 years. For every 100 females, there were 93.7 males. For every 100 females age 18 and over, there were 85.5 males.

The median income for a household in the city was $35,927, and the median income for a family was $44,125. Males had a median income of $30,972 versus $21,042 for females. The per capita income for the city was $16,925. About 3.5% of families and 7.2% of the population were below the poverty line, including 8.1% of those under age 18 and 14.8% of those age 65 or over.

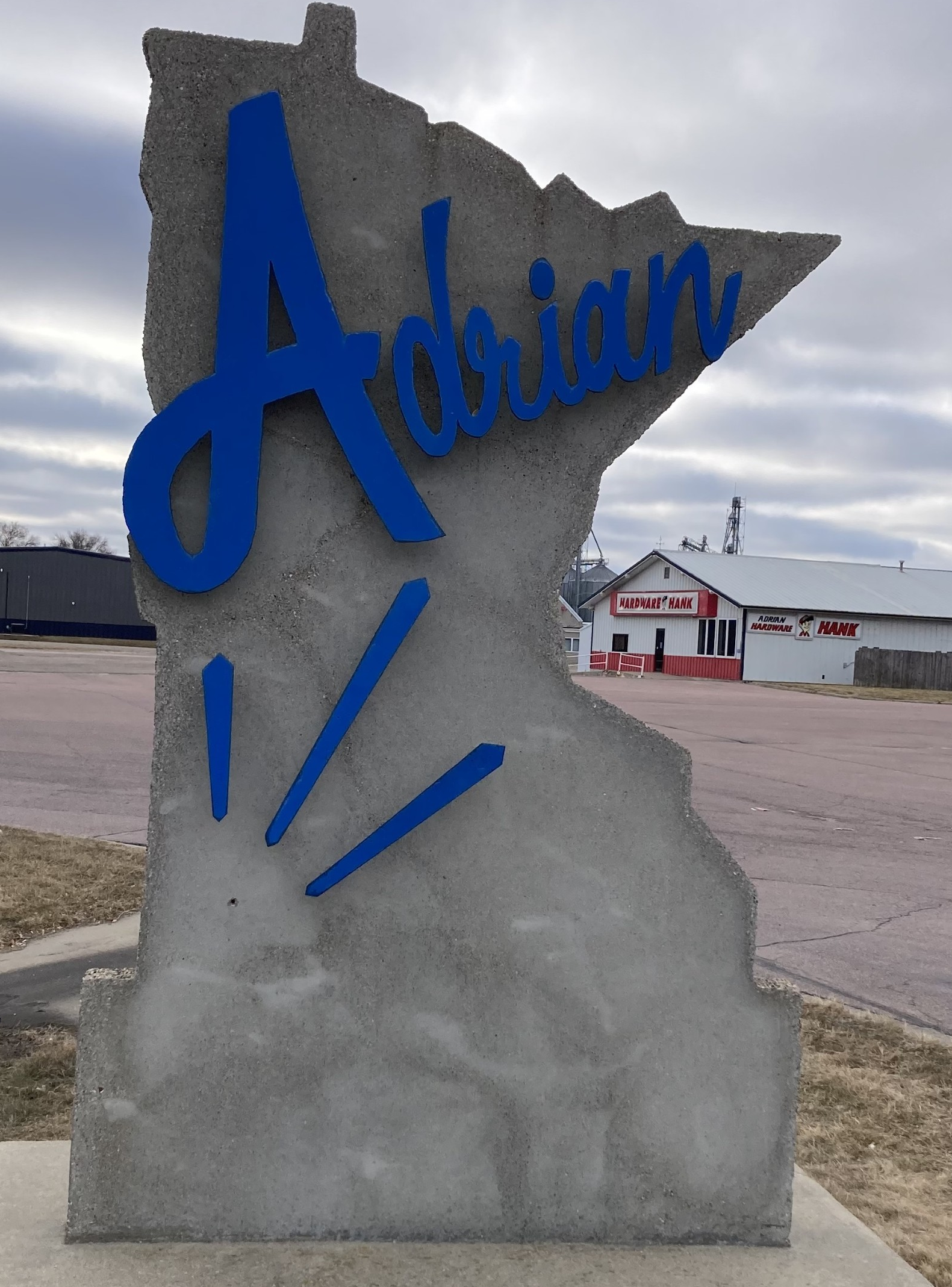
Monument sign identifying Adrian, MN

== History ==
Adrian owes its birth to the St. Paul and Dakota Railroad Company, a branch of the Sioux City and St. Paul Railroad. Railroad employee O.D. Brown surveyed a 16-block town site in May 1876 and track-laying crews arrived in August of that same year. A city plat was dedicated on August 28 and filed on October 4.

=== Name ===
Portrait of Mrs. Adrian Iselin, by John Singer Sargent

Railroad company history states that the city was named after Adrian Iselin, a large stockholder in the Sioux City and St. Paul Railroad. A copy of a portrait of Iselin's wife, painted by John Singer Sargent, has been displayed for years in Adrian City Hall.

=== Railroad era ===
Adrian's early development was largely fostered by the efforts of John Ireland, bishop of the Diocese of Saint Paul. Through the Catholic press, he encouraged Catholics from eastern cities to come to Minnesota, and he used his personal wealth to buy land near Adrian to sell to the new arrivals. In 1877, he bought 20,000 acres (81 km^{2}) of land; seven months later he made an additional purchase of 35,000 acres (140 km^{2}).

In 1877, 100,000 bushels of grain were shipped from the Adrian station, and the town population totaled 193 people as of 1880. By 1882 the local parish reported 250 Catholic families living in the area. The town population increased to 671 in 1890 and 1,258 in 1900. Growth slowed thereafter, as some of Adrian's rail trade had shifted to the towns of Ellsworth, Lismore and Wilmont. In 1893, Adrian tried but failed to split Nobles County into two parts in order to become a county seat.

=== St. Adrian Catholic Church ===
The first St. Adrian Catholic Church was established in 1877. The building burned to the ground Christmas Eve, 1899. The young town responded by building the current church, which was completed in 1901. St. Adrian Church is on the National Register of Historic Places along with the Hotel Slade.

=== Interstate highway era ===
At 2:00 p.m., November 4, 1967, the section of Interstate Highway 90 passing Adrian officially opened to traffic. The previously used highway, U.S. Highway 16, passed directly through town. The by-passing of all east–west traffic forever sealed the character of Adrian as a small town.

== Notable people ==
- Cedric Adams – 1930s–1950s-era WCCO AM radio personality, TV broadcaster and daily newspaper columnist in the Twin Cities. Upper Midwest pilots saw lights flicker out at the end of his 10 p.m. radio news broadcasts. "The Great Mellow Voice of the Midwest" is a 2002 inductee of the Pavek Museum of Broadcasting Hall of Fame.
- Lloyd Voss – 1964 Green Bay Packers' first-round draft pick, member of a Vince Lombardi-coached Packers Super Bowl winner. Pittsburgh Steelers six-year defensive end starter. Missed only three games in nine NFL seasons. Enshrined in Nebraska Football Hall of Fame in 1966.

== Politics ==
Adrian is located in Minnesota's 1st congressional district, represented by Brad Finstad, a Republican. At the state level, Adrian is located in Senate District 22, represented by Republican Bill Weber, and in House District 22A, represented by Republican Joe Schomacker.

== Local politics ==
The mayor of Adrian is Robert Wiese. Adrian city council members are Denny Kruger, Ron Lonneman, Don Shorter, and Robert Wiese. Adrian is located within Olney and Westside Townships, both of which are represented by Nobles County Commissioner Gene Metz
