= Wilmont, Minnesota =

City in Minnesota, United States

Wilmont
- City
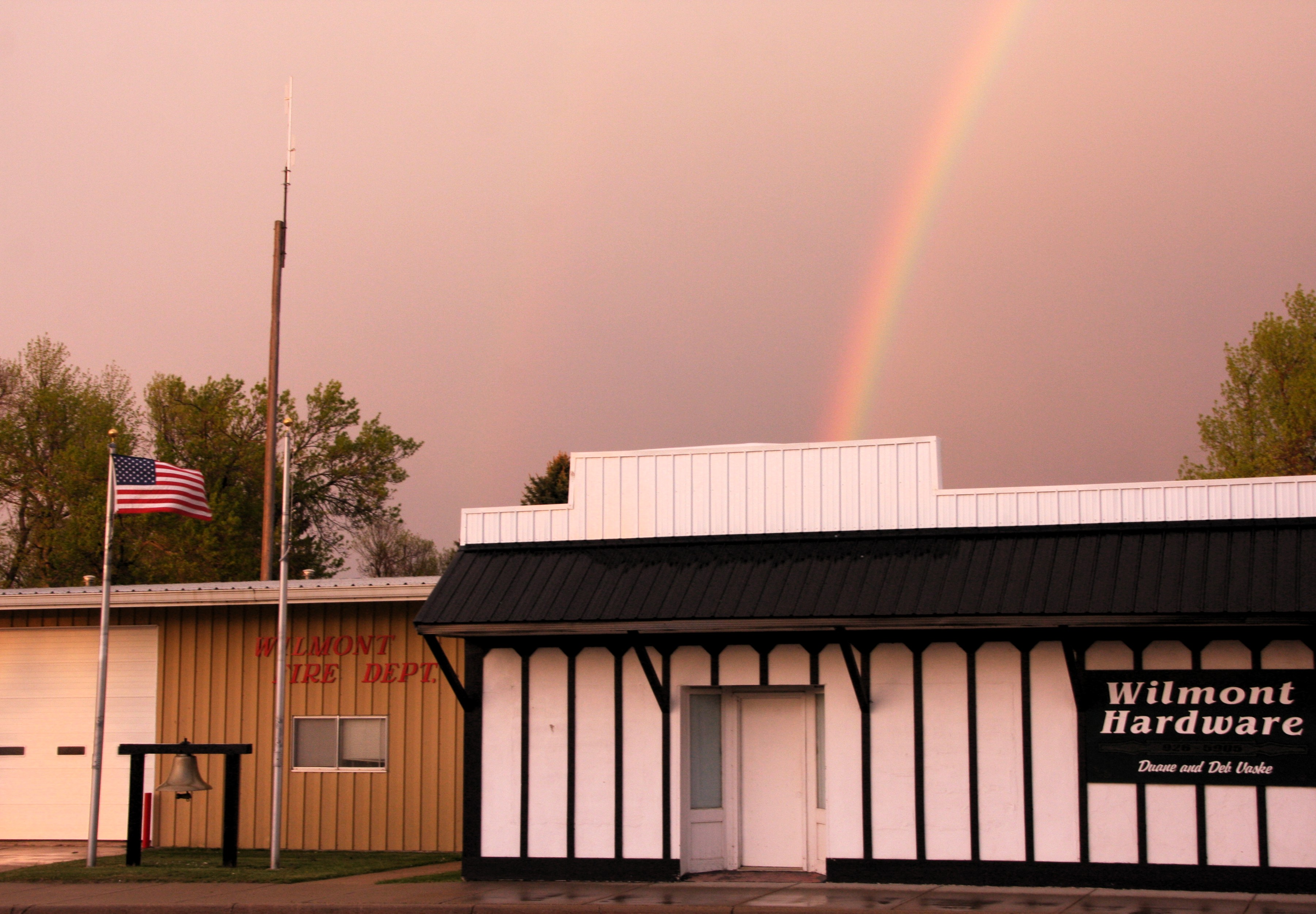
- Wilmont in 2016

- Location of Wilmont, Minnesota
- Coordinates: 43°45′50″N 95°49′35″W
- Country: United States
- State: Minnesota
- County: Nobles

Government
  - Type: Mayor – Council
  - Mayor: Daryl Behrends

Area
  - Total: 0.69 sq mi (1.80 km^{2})
  - Land: 0.69 sq mi (1.80 km^{2})
  - Water: 0 sq mi (0.00 km^{2})
- Elevation: 1,729 ft (527 m)

Population (2020)
  - Total: 332
  - Density: 478.4/sq mi (184.71/km^{2})
- Time zone: UTC−6 (Central (CST))
  - Summer (DST): UTC−5 (CDT)
- ZIP Code: 56185
- Area code: 507
- FIPS code: 27-70582
- GNIS feature ID: 2397329
- Website: https://cityofwilmont.com/

Wilmont is a city in Nobles County, Minnesota, United States. As of the 2020 census, Wilmont had a population of 332.

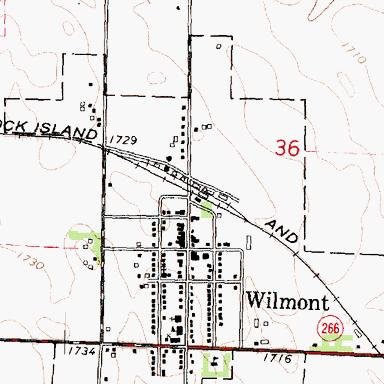
Topographic Map of Wilmont before the removal of the Rock Island Railroad tracks

== Geography ==
Main Street Wilmont, 1904

According to the United States Census Bureau, the city has a total area of 1.14 square miles (2.95 km^{2}), all land. By elevation, Wilmont is the highest incorporated community in Nobles County.

Main highways include:

- Minnesota State Highway 266

(Discontinued in 2003—renamed Nobles County Road 25)

- Nobles County Road 25
- Nobles County Road 16
- Nobles County Road 13

== History ==
1900 plat map of Wilmont when lots for the new town were being sold

The town of Wilmont was established in 1899. The town was named in a roundabout way after the township in which it was located.

Willmont Township (note the double-L) was established in 1878. There was a general disagreement over the township name, one faction wishing to call it Willumet, and the other favoring Lamont. On November 22, 1878, a compromise was reached, and the township was formally named Willmont.

For twenty-one years, the residents of Willmont Township lacked convenient railroad transport. That all changed in the summer of 1899 when the Burlington Railway surveyed a new route extending northwest from Worthington. Railroad right-of-way man Thomas H. Brown selected a site for a new town and named it Wilmont. He made a point of spelling the new town with one L to distinguish it from Willmont Township. The railroad was completed on December 16, 1899, and hundreds of newcomers soon took up residence.

The survey was made, and the plat was dedicated on January 22, 1900. A Post Office was established on February 13, 1900. In April 1900, the first saloon was established in Wilmont by the Stuntebeck Brothers. Construction of a new school was approved in September 1900 with the school opening two years later. When the town celebrated its first birthday in December 1900, the town boasted two churches (Presbyterian and Catholic), three saloons, and nearly two dozen other businesses. The date and reason for Willmont Township's name change from Willmont (double-L) to Wilmont (single-L) remains obscure.

Minnesota State Highway 266 was constructed in 1949, connecting Worthington, Reading, and Wilmont. Responsibility for this highway was transferred to Nobles County in 2003. It has been renamed Nobles County Road 25. The Burlington Railway later was taken over by the Rock Island Railroad. This line was closed, and the tracks torn up, in the 1970s.

Wilmont once boasted both public and Catholic schools. However, the town's last school closed in the 1970s. Children are currently bused to schools in Worthington, Adrian, or Fulda. Minnesota's open-enrollment law allows Wilmont residents this choice.

Despite having no school, railroad, or state highway connection, Wilmont remains a thriving community of 332 residents. As in 1900, life in Wilmont revolves around the town's churches and saloons.

The village of Wilmont, exactly one year after the arrival of the railroad and construction of the first buildings and houses.

== Demographics ==
Historical population
Census	Pop.	Note	%±
1910	258		—
1920	376		45.7%
1930	374		−0.5%
1940	361		−3.5%
1950	473		31.0%
1960	473		0.0%
1970	390		−17.5%
1980	380		−2.6%
1990	351		−7.6%
2000	332		−5.4%
2010	339		2.1%
2020	332		−2.1%
U.S. Decennial Census

=== 2010 census ===
As of the census of 2010, there were 339 people, 143 households, and 97 families residing in the city. The population density was 297.4 inhabitants per square mile (114.8/km^{2}). There were 152 housing units at an average density of 133.3 per square mile (51.5/km^{2}). The racial makeup of the city was 95.9% White, 2.1% African American, 0.3% Native American, 0.6% Asian, 0.3% from other races, and 0.9% from two or more races. Hispanic or Latino of any race were 1.2% of the population.

There were 143 households, of which 30.8% had children under the age of 18 living with them, 53.8% were married couples living together, 11.2% had a female householder with no husband present, 2.8% had a male householder with no wife present, and 32.2% were non-families. Of all households 28.0% were made up of individuals, and 9.1% had someone living alone who was 65 years of age or older. The average household size was 2.37 and the average family size was 2.92.

The median age in the city was 36.9 years. 26.8% of residents were under the age of 18; 7.8% were between the ages of 18 and 24; 21.2% were from 25 to 44; 30.5% were from 45 to 64; and 13.9% were 65 years of age or older. The gender makeup of the city was 49.0% male and 51.0% female.

=== 2000 census ===
As of the census of 2000, there were 332 people, 142 households, and 93 families residing in the city. The population density was 291.4 inhabitants per square mile (112.5/km^{2}). There were 155 housing units at an average density of 136.0 per square mile (52.5/km^{2}). The racial makeup of the city was 99.40% White, 0.30% Native American, and 0.30% from two or more races.

There were 142 households, out of which 28.2% had children under the age of 18 living with them, 51.4% were married couples living together, 7.7% had a female householder with no husband present, and 34.5% were non-families. Of all households 28.9% were made up of individuals, and 16.2% had someone living alone who was 65 years of age or older. The average household size was 2.34 and the average family size was 2.87.

In the city, the population was spread out, with 25.3% under the age of 18, 8.7% from 18 to 24, 26.2% from 25 to 44, 18.7% from 45 to 64, and 21.1% who were 65 years of age or older. The median age was 38 years. For every 100 females, there were 108.8 males. For every 100 females age 18 and over, there were 105.0 males.

The median income for a household in the city was $29,464, and the median income for a family was $37,344. Males had a median income of $28,194 versus $14,375 for females. The per capita income for the city was $16,160. About 4.9% of families and 6.8% of the population were below the poverty line, including none of those under age 18 and 14.7% of those age 65 or over.

== Politics ==
Wilmont is located in Minnesota's 1st congressional district, represented by Brad Finstad, a Republican. At the state level, Wilmont is located in Senate District 21, represented by Republican Bill Weber, and in House District 21A, represented by Republican Joe Schomacker.

=== Local politics ===
The mayor of Wilmont is Daryl Behrends. Council members are Thomas Slater, Carolyn Penning, Isaac Joens, and Alicia Entinger. The city of Wilmont is located within Wilmont Township and is represented by Nobles County Commissioner Gene Metz.
