= List of United States tornadoes in June 2010 =

This is a list of all tornadoes that were confirmed by local offices of the National Weather Service in the United States in June 2010.

== United States yearly total ==
Confirmed tornadoes by Enhanced Fujita rating
EFU	EF0	EF1	EF2	EF3	EF4	EF5	Total
0	768	342	127	32	13	0	1,282

== June ==
Confirmed tornadoes by Enhanced Fujita rating
EFU	EF0	EF1	EF2	EF3	EF4	EF5	Total
0	194	81	28	7	6	0	325

Note: 9 tornadoes were confirmed in the final totals, but do not have a listed rating.

=== June 1 event ===
List of confirmed tornadoes –Tuesday, June 1, 2010 (Note: All dates are based on the local time zone where the tornado touched down; however, all times are in Coordinated Universal Time for consistency.)
EF#	Location	County / Parish	State	Start Coord.	Time (UTC)	Path length	Max width	Summary
EF0	WNW of Sanborn	O'Brien	IA	43.2°N 95.733°W	18:22–18:23	0.3 mi (0.48 km)	50 yd (46 m)	A brief tornado caused no damage.
EF0	ENE of Altona to SE of Wayne	Wayne	NE	42.135°N 96.8568°W	19:58–20:00	1.38 mi (2.22 km)	100 yd (91 m)	Soybean crops were damaged.
EF2	SSW of Tingley	Ringgold	IA	40.8021°N 94.2289°W	22:08–22:11	1.51 mi (2.43 km)	250 yd (230 m)	A strong, intermittent cone tornado struck a large farmstead. A 400 ft (120 m) long metal cattle barn on the farmstead was destroyed at high-end EF2 strength. Other buildings, including the home, received extensive damage but not as significant. Three head of cattle were killed when the cattle barn was destroyed.
EF1	SE of Cedar Creek	Cass	NE	41.0035°N 96.0641°W	23:05–23:06	0.55 mi (0.89 km)	200 yd (180 m)	A brief tornado touchdown caused damage to a pole barn.
EF0	ESE of Buffalo	Johnson	WY	44.1759°N 106.0222°W	23:54–23:56	0.11 mi (0.18 km)	25 yd (23 m)	A motorist on I-90 videoed a landspout.

=== June 2 event ===
List of confirmed tornadoes –Wednesday, June 2, 2010
EF#	Location	County / Parish	State	Start Coord.	Time (UTC)	Path length	Max width	Summary
EF0	WNW of Conneautville to SW of Springboro	Crawford	PA	41.7665°N 80.4119°W	18:40–18:42	1.19 mi (1.92 km)	50 yd (46 m)	Approximately two hundred trees were downed and a barn had minor damage.
EF0	N of New Home	Lynn	TX	33.3634°N 101.92°W	20:55–20:57	0.1 mi (0.16 km)	15 yd (14 m)	A NWS meteorologist observed a short-lived landspout tornado.
EF0	NW of Patten	Penobscot	ME	46.1453°N 68.6551°W	21:06–21:14	2.48 mi (3.99 km)	500 yd (460 m)	A large tornado snapped and uprooted numerous trees.
EF1	ENE of Scroggsfield to NNE of Provo	Carroll, Jefferson	OH	40.5899°N 80.8847°W	21:58–22:05	3.78 mi (6.08 km)	300 yd (270 m)	Trees were downed and snapped. Damage also occurred when a porch roof was torn off, shingles were ripped off roofs, windows were broken and siding was torn off homes. A chimney was knocked down and numerous outbuildings suffered roof or wall damage. A large tree also fell on a mobile home.
EF1	ENE of Mathis to SSW of Papalote	San Patricio, Bee	TX	28.151°N 97.7433°W	03:47–04:02	7.57 mi (12.18 km)	440 yd (400 m)	Crops were flattened, several large crop sprinklers were flipped over, a shed was partially destroyed, and power poles snapped as this tornado rode the San Patricio-Bee county line.
EF0	NNE of Chapman Ranch	Nueces	TX	27.6343°N 97.4542°W	04:15–04:16	0.47 mi (0.76 km)	20 yd (18 m)	A tornado traveled through farm fields.
EF0	NE of Bonnie View	Refugio	TX	28.146°N 97.2825°W	04:18–04:19	0.25 mi (0.40 km)	20 yd (18 m)	A weak tornado flattened crops
EF2	W of Rockport	Aransas	TX	28.0499°N 97.1254°W	04:34–04:44	3.76 mi (6.05 km)	500 yd (460 m)	Several homes were damaged, a RV was flipped, and four boats damaged by a strong tornado. Over twenty large tension poles were snapped completely. Hundreds of trees and tree limbs were snapped. Vehicles at a junkyard were moved several yards, and a garage was completely destroyed. A semi-truck was flipped over as well.

=== June 3 event ===
List of confirmed tornadoes –Thursday, June 3, 2010
EF#	Location	County / Parish	State	Start Coord.	Time (UTC)	Path length	Max width	Summary
EF0	W of Owaneco	Christian	IL	39.4879°N 89.2533°W	18:06–18:07	0.1 mi (0.16 km)	15 yd (14 m)	A tornado briefly touched down in an open field.
EF0	W of Berwyn	Custer	NE	41.3505°N 99.5197°W	23:30–23:34	0.1 mi (0.16 km)	10 yd (9.1 m)	A brief tornado hit a storm chaser's car with debris.

=== June 4 event ===
List of confirmed tornadoes –Friday, June 4, 2010
EF#	Location	County / Parish	State	Start Coord.	Time (UTC)	Path length	Max width	Summary
EF0	N of Richland	St. Mary	LA	29.7916°N 91.7025°W	10:37	0.01 mi (0.016 km)	10 yd (9.1 m)	Local law enforcement reported a brief tornado touchdown.
EF0	NW of Julien to W of Garrel	St. Mary	LA	29.8668°N 91.6447°W	10:47–10:50	1.03 mi (1.66 km)	25 yd (23 m)	A tree fell onto an abandoned mobile home.
EF0	SE of Loeffler	Adair	MO	40.05°N 92.84°W	23:20–23:21	0.1 mi (0.16 km)	20 yd (18 m)	A brief tornado occurred over rural land.
EF0	NNE of Ethel	Macon	MO	39.92°N 92.74°W	23:27–23:28	0.1 mi (0.16 km)	20 yd (18 m)	A tornado was observed over rural fields.
EF0	NE of Wolcott	White	IN	40.7807°N 87.0158°W	00:55–00:56	0.09 mi (0.14 km)	20 yd (18 m)	A trained spotter photographed and videoed a tornado in an open field.

=== June 5 event ===
List of confirmed tornadoes –Saturday, June 5, 2010
EF#	Location	County / Parish	State	Start Coord.	Time (UTC)	Path length	Max width	Summary
EF0	ESE of East Mansfield	Richland	OH	40.7395°N 82.4387°W	17:46–17:47	0.45 mi (0.72 km)	20 yd (18 m)	
EF1	SW of Craftsbury	Orleans	VT	44.62°N 72.42°W	18:30–18:34	2.09 mi (3.36 km)	83 yd (76 m)	
EF1	NW of Berlin to ESE of Sugarcreek	Holmes, Tuscarawas	OH	40.57°N 81.82°W	18:40–19:00	12.84 mi (20.66 km)	100 yd (91 m)	
EF0	Gorham	Coos	NH	44.3996°N 71.22°W	20:14	0.1 mi (0.16 km)	40 yd (37 m)	
EF1	ESE of South Paris to W of West Minot	Oxford	ME	44.2072°N 70.4637°W	21:19–21:28	4.2 mi (6.8 km)	300 yd (270 m)	
EF0	NE of St. Charles	Warren	IA	41.2995°N 93.789°W	23:11–23:12	1.13 mi (1.82 km)	30 yd (27 m)	
EF0	NE of Abingdon	Knox	IL	40.8345°N 90.3554°W	00:34–00:35	4.2 mi (6.8 km)	300 yd (270 m)	
EF1	Northern Maquoketa	Jackson	IA	42.0834°N 90.6883°W	00:40–00:45	2.2 mi (3.5 km)	150 yd (140 m)	
EF2	NNW of Douglas to Elmwood	Knox, Peoria	IL	40.801°N 90.0919°W	00:56–01:04	7.81 mi (12.57 km)	50 yd (46 m)	
EF0	SSE of Preston	Clinton	IA	42.0048°N 90.3729°W	01:00–01:01	0.43 mi (0.69 km)	100 yd (91 m)	
EF1	SW of Southport to SE of Oak Hill	Peoria	IL	40.7732°N 89.9174°W	01:10–01:18	4.86 mi (7.82 km)	100 yd (91 m)	
EF1	NE of Henry to northern Magnolia to SW of Lostant	Putnam, LaSalle	IL	41.1289°N 89.3142°W	01:10–01:30	10.29 mi (16.56 km)	880 yd (800 m)	
EF1	WNW of Olin to N of Edwards	Peoria	IL	40.7616°N 89.8175°W	01:18–01:24	3.88 mi (6.24 km)	75 yd (69 m)	
EF0	Northwestern Peoria	Peoria	IL	40.7652°N 89.67°W	01:32–01:35	2.02 mi (3.25 km)	100 yd (91 m)	
EF0	W of Naplate	LaSalle	IL	41.3269°N 88.9365°W	01:32–01:33	0.21 mi (0.34 km)	50 yd (46 m)	
EF2	SSW of Lostant to southern Streator to NNW of Missal	Marshall, LaSalle	IL	41.1005°N 89.0869°W	01:34–01:57	17.62 mi (28.36 km)	800 yd (730 m)	
EF0	W of Streator	LaSalle	IL	41.1171°N 88.8841°W	01:50–01:51	0.15 mi (0.24 km)	20 yd (18 m)	
EF2	N of Washington to SSE of Metamora	Tazewell, Woodford	IL	40.7457°N 89.4°W	01:51–01:58	3.08 mi (4.96 km)	250 yd (230 m)	
EF3	E of Missal to NW of Nevada	Livingston	IL	41.0998°N 88.7302°W	01:58–02:10	8.55 mi (13.76 km)	440 yd (400 m)	
EF2	E of Nevada to Dwight	Livingston	IL	41.0876°N 88.5213°W	02:12–02:25	5.96 mi (9.59 km)	300 yd (270 m)	1 death –
EF0	WNW of Dwight	Livingston	IL	41.1032°N 88.4914°W	02:16–02:20	2.35 mi (3.78 km)	20 yd (18 m)	
EF0	SW of Blair to SW of Reddick	Livingston	IL	41.0819°N 88.3435°W	02:31–02:38	3.82 mi (6.15 km)	20 yd (18 m)	
EF2	S of South Delta to SE of Brailey	Fulton	OH	41.4879°N 84.0131°W	02:38–02:44	7.24 mi (11.65 km)	700 yd (640 m)	
EF1	NW of Whitehouse	Lucas	OH	41.53°N 83.87°W	03:00–03:05	3.4 mi (5.5 km)	100 yd (91 m)	
EF1	SW of Greenwich	Kankakee	IL	41.0785°N 87.9699°W	03:02–03:03	0.62 mi (1.00 km)	30 yd (27 m)	
EF0	WSW of Wing	Livingston	IL	40.8176°N 88.4182°W	03:08–03:10	0.39 mi (0.63 km)	50 yd (46 m)	
EF3	SE of Aroma Park to NNE of Hopkins Park	Kankakee	IL	41.0636°N 87.7523°W	03:18–03:37	7.75 mi (12.47 km)	175 yd (160 m)	
EF1	NW of Wichert	Kankakee	IL	41.0734°N 87.741°W	03:19–03:20	0.56 mi (0.90 km)	50 yd (46 m)	
EF4	E of Perrysburg to Millbury to NW of Clay Center	Wood, Ottawa	OH	41.5512°N 83.538°W	03:20–03:34	8.8 mi (14.2 km)	400 yd (370 m)	7 deaths –
EF2	NNW of Baroda to WSW of Buckhorn	Berrien	MI	41.9792°N 86.4982°W	03:28–03:35	3.38 mi (5.44 km)	200 yd (180 m)	
EF1	NW of Berrien Springs	Berrien	MI	41.9857°N 86.4199°W	03:36–03:39	1.44 mi (2.32 km)	100 yd (91 m)	
EF0	SW of Beason to SW of Rowell	Logan, DeWitt	IL	40.1212°N 89.2471°W	03:57–04:15	11.83 mi (19.04 km)	300 yd (270 m)	
EF2	SSE of Dowagiac to NNW of Cassopolis	Cass	MI	41.962°N 86.092°W	03:59–04:04	2.73 mi (4.39 km)	200 yd (180 m)	
EF1	Southern Battle Creek	Calhoun	MI	42.2902°N 85.1993°W	04:03–04:05	1.62 mi (2.61 km)	300 yd (270 m)	
EF2	SW of Constantine to SW of Sturgis	St. Joseph	MI	41.8172°N 85.6873°W	04:32–04:30	10.65 mi (17.14 km)	200 yd (180 m)	

=== June 7 event ===
List of reported tornadoes - Monday, June 7, 2010
EF#	Location	County	Coord.	Time (UTC)	Path length	Comments/Damage
Nebraska
EF0	E of Porter	Sioux	42.00°N 103.65°W	0020	1 mile (1.6 km)	Tornado spotted with debris but no damage.
EF1	Scottsbluff area	Scotts Bluff	41.87°N 103.64°W	0123	19 miles (31 km)	Tornado tracked from the east side of town eastward. Several houses, businesses and mobile homes were damaged and four grain bins were thrown.
EF0	NW of Alliance	Box Butte	42.11°N 102.90°W	0124	2 miles (3.2 km)	Tornado remained in open country.
EF0	E of Gering	Scotts Bluff	41.82°N 103.62°W	0125	unknown	Brief tornado touchdown with no damage.
EF0	SW of Scottsbluff	Scotts Bluff	41.87°N 103.60°W	0128	unknown	Brief tornado touchdown with no damage.
EF1	SW of Bayard	Morrill	41.72°N 103.35°W	0154	2 miles (3.2 km)	A recreational vehicle was destroyed by the tornado.
EF0	SE of Broadwater	Morrill	41.55°N 102.77°W	0154	2 miles (3.2 km)	Tornado remained in open country.
North Dakota
EF0	SE of Rhame	Bowman	46.21°N 103.64°W	0111	2 miles (3.2 km)	A metal calf shed was destroyed.
EF0	SW of Bowman	Bowman	46.12°N 103.40°W	0212	unknown	Brief tornado touchdown with no damage.
Sources: NWS Cheyenne, NCDC Storm Data

=== June 8 event ===
List of reported tornadoes - Tuesday, June 8, 2010
EF#	Location	County	Coord.	Time (UTC)	Path length	Comments/Damage
Texas
EF0	Baytown	Harris	29.75°N 94.97°W	1557	unknown	Brief tornado with significant damage to an apartment complex.
Kansas
EF0	W of Melvern	Osage	38.50°N 95.67°W	2155	unknown	Brief tornado damaged three power poles.
EF0	SE of Williamsburg	Franklin	38.46°N 95.44°W	2255	unknown	Brief tornado touchdown with no damage.
EF0	S of Gridley	Coffey	38.06°N 95.87°W	0029	unknown	Tornado moved slowly over open country with no damage.
EF0	W of Welda	Anderson	38.16°N 95.32°W	0047	unknown	Brief tornado pulled up playground equipment but no other damage.
Missouri
EF0	S of Harrisonville	Cass	38.64°N 94.35°W	2239	2 miles (3.2 km)	A church lost parts of its roof, a commercial building sustained minor damage and a few trees were knocked down.
Iowa
EF0	SW of Story City	Story	42.15°N 93.60°W	2302	unknown	Brief tornado touchdown with no damage.
EF0	S of Zearing	Story	42.12°N 93.30°W	2334	unknown	Brief landspout tornado with no damage.
Colorado
EF0	NW of Simla	Elbert	39.25°N 104.12°W	0229	unknown	Brief tornado touchdown with no damage.
Sources: SPC Storm Reports for 06/08/10, NWS Houston/Galveston, NCDC Storm Data

=== June 9 event ===
List of reported tornadoes - Wednesday, June 9, 2010
EF#	Location	County	Coord.	Time (UTC)	Path length	Comments/Damage
Texas
EF1	Nome	Jefferson	30.01°N 94.42°W	1032	3 miles (4.8 km)	About 30 houses were damaged and several barns were destroyed. Many trees and power lines were also damaged.
Kentucky
EF0	W of Columbia	Adair	37.10°N 85.40°W	2310	0.67 miles (1.08 km)	A barn was destroyed with two horses inside (they were not injured). Trees were knocked down, some landing on a garage.
Sources: NWS Lake Charles, NWS Louisville, NCDC Storm Data

=== June 10 event ===
List of reported tornadoes - Thursday, June 10, 2010
EF#	Location	County	Coord.	Time (UTC)	Path length	Comments/Damage
Texas
EF1	SSW of Wheeler Springs	Houston	31.30°N 95.64°W	1556	3 miles (4.8 km)	An old building lost parts of its roof and farm equipment was damaged. Trees were also knocked down.
EF0	W of Wooster	Houston	31.46°N 95.46°W	1629	1 mile (1.6 km)	Three large trees were uprooted and one house sustained minor damage.
Colorado
EF0	NE of Deer Trail	Arapahoe	39.65°N 103.98°W	0052	unknown	Brief tornado touchdown with no damage.
EF0	W of Prospect	Weld	40.05°N 104.42°W	0120	unknown	Brief tornado touchdown with no damage.
EF0	E of Last Chance	Washington	39.72°N 103.55°W	0146	unknown	Brief tornado touchdown with no damage.
EF0	SSE of Akron	Washington	39.88°N 103.05°W	0227	unknown	Brief tornado touchdown with no damage.
Sources: NCDC Storm Data

=== June 11 event ===
List of reported tornadoes - Friday, June 11, 2010
EF#	Location	County	Coord.	Time (UTC)	Path length	Comments/Damage
Ohio
EF0	Lima	Allen	40.75°N 84.13°W	2133	unknown	Brief weak tornado confirmed with damage limited to a flipped trampoline.
Colorado
EF0	SE of Matheson	Elbert	39.12°N 103.92°W	2327	unknown	Brief tornado touchdown with no damage.
EF0	ENE of Genoa	Lincoln	39.32°N 103.38°W	0110	unknown	Brief tornado touchdown with no damage.
Kansas
EF1	NW of Lucerne (1st tornado)	Sheridan	39.50°N 100.25°W	0115	3 miles (4.8 km)	A farmhouse sustained roof, window and door damage. A barn and farm equipment were also damaged.
EF0	NW of Lucerne (2nd tornado)	Sheridan	39.50°N 100.26°W	0117	unknown	Satellite tornado to the 0115 Lucerne tornado with no damage.
EF0	NW of Lucerne (3rd tornado)	Sheridan	39.55°N 100.30°W	0200	1 mile (1.6 km)	One of two distinct tornadoes at the same time with no damage.
EF0	NW of Lucerne (4th tornado)	Sheridan	39.56°N 100.30°W	0200	1 mile (1.6 km)	One of two distinct tornadoes at the same time with no damage.
Nebraska
EF0	S of Elwood	Gosper	40.47°N 99.85°W	0303	unknown	Brief tornado touchdown with no damage.
EF0	SE of Sutherland	Lincoln	41.15°N 101.10°W	0500	unknown	Brief tornado touchdown with no damage.
EF0	WSW of North Platte	Lincoln	41.12°N 100.89°W	0515	unknown	Tornado partially rain-wrapped and was sighted off Interstate 80 with no damage.
Sources: SPC Storm Reports for 06/11/10, NCDC Storm Data

=== June 12 event ===
List of reported tornadoes - Saturday, June 12, 2010
EF#	Location	County	Coord.	Time (UTC)	Path length	Comments/Damage
Texas
EF0	S of Sunray	Moore	35.90°N 101.72°W	2014	1 mile (1.6 km)	Narrow cone tornado remained in open country.
Kansas
EF1	NW of Great Bend	Barton	38.38°N 98.82°W	2253	1 mile (1.6 km)	A couple outbuildings sustained minor damage.
EF0	E of Heizer	Barton	38.42°N 98.80°W	2306	1 mile (1.6 km)	Tornado remained over open fields.
EF0	SW of Claflin	Barton	38.49°N 98.57°W	2332	unknown	Brief tornado touchdown with no damage.
EF0	SSW of Bushton	Rice	38.49°N 98.41°W	2356	unknown	Brief tornado touchdown with no damage.
EF1	SE of Bushton	Rice	38.48°N 98.34°W	0003	2 miles (3.2 km)	A few power poles were knocked down.
Indiana
EF0	SE of Lewisville	Morgan	39.44°N 86.59°W	0026	6 miles (9.7 km)	A modular home sustained roof damage and trees were knocked down.
Sources: NCDC Storm Data

=== June 13 event ===
List of reported tornadoes - Sunday, June 13, 2010
EF#	Location	County	Coord.	Time (UTC)	Path length	Comments/Damage
Oklahoma
EF0	S of Elmwood	Beaver	36.52°N 100.54°W	2052	5 miles (8.0 km)	Tornado remained over open country.
EF0	E of Elmwood	Beaver	36.62°N 100.31°W	2117	3 miles (4.8 km)	Rain-wrapped tornado remained over open country.
EF0	W of Slapout	Beaver	36.62°N 100.29°W	2122	3 miles (4.8 km)	Rain-wrapped tornado remained over open country.
EF0	WNW of Slapout	Beaver	36.62°N 100.29°W	2141	3 miles (4.8 km)	Tornado reported by the Oklahoma Highway Patrol remaining over open country.
Texas
EF0	WSW of Lipscomb	Lipscomb	36.16°N 100.52°W	2224	unknown	Brief rope tornado with no damage.
Nebraska
EF1	SW of Precept	Furnas	40.05°N 99.76°W	2333	2 miles (3.2 km)	Significant damage was reported to several buildings on a farm, including a house, several barns, large propane tank and three grain bins.
Sources: NCDC Storm Data

=== June 14 event ===
List of reported tornadoes - Monday, June 14, 2010
EF#	Location	County	Coord.	Time (UTC)	Path length	Comments/Damage
Texas
EF0	SW of Wilson	Lynn	33.28°N 101.72°W	1940	unknown	Brief tornado tracked by storm chasers with minor damage to their equipment.
EF0	N of Friendship	Dawson	32.70°N 102.04°W	2200	1 mile (1.6 km)	Rope tornado remained over open country.
Sources: NCDC Storm Data

=== June 16 event ===
List of confirmed tornadoes – Wednesday, June 16, 2010 (Note: All dates are based on the local time zone where the tornado touched down; however, all times are in Coordinated Universal Time for consistency.)
EF#	Location	County / Parish	State	Start Coord.	Time (UTC)	Path length	Max width
EF2	SE of Bowler	Carbon	MT	45.18°N 108.69°W	23:00–23:05	1 mi (1.6 km)	75 yd (69 m)
EF2	This strong tornado caused significant damage to electrical infrastructure, destroying four transmission structures, damaging another transmission pole, and shredding two wooden power poles. Some fencing was also damaged.						
EF0	S of Red Elm (1st tornado)	Ziebach	SD	44.9487°N 101.77°W	23:04–23:05	0.1 mi (0.16 km)	20 yd (18 m)
EF0	A brief tornado touched down and caused no damage.						
EF0	S of Red Elm (2nd tornado)	Ziebach	SD	45.01°N 101.77°W	23:30–23:32	0.1 mi (0.16 km)	30 yd (27 m)
EF0	This tornado briefly touched down and remained over open land.						
EF0	S of Red Elm (3rd tornado)	Ziebach	SD	45.01°N 101.77°W	23:40	0.1 mi (0.16 km)	10 yd (9.1 m)
EF0	A small needle-shaped tornado briefly occurred.						
EF0	S of Red Elm (4th tornado)	Ziebach	SD	45.01°N 101.77°W	23:41	0.1 mi (0.16 km)	10 yd (9.1 m)
EF0	No damage occurred from this narrow, brief tornado.						
EF1	ESE of Red Elm to W of Dupree	Ziebach	SD	45.0291°N 101.6809°W	00:22–00:45	2.26 mi (3.64 km)	450 yd (410 m)
EF1	A tornado touched down southwest of Dupree and moved northeast, crossing US 212 and blowing over power poles.						
EF0	W of Dupree	Ziebach	SD	45.0291°N 101.6809°W	00:30	0.1 mi (0.16 km)	10 yd (9.1 m)
EF0	A small satellite tornado to the 0022 UTC tornado caused no damage.						
EF2	Western Dupree	Ziebach	SD	45.0356°N 101.6126°W	00:33–00:49	1.38 mi (2.22 km)	450 yd (410 m)
EF2	This strong tornado touched down just south of Dupree and tracked through the west side of town, causing significant structural damage. The roof was torn off the community center, a nearby house and garage were damaged, and large grain bins were crumpled. Several mobile homes were tossed by the winds. Two people were injured..						
EF0	N of Dupree (1st tornado)	Ziebach	SD	45.0604°N 101.6086°W	00:40–00:42	0.05 mi (0.080 km)	30 yd (27 m)
EF0	This tornado remained over open land.						
EF0	N of Dupree (2nd tornado)	Ziebach	SD	45.0604°N 101.6086°W	00:40–00:42	0.05 mi (0.080 km)	30 yd (27 m)
EF0	A tornado briefly occurred.						
EF0	NNW of Dupree (1st tornado)	Ziebach	SD	45.09°N 101.64°W	00:53	0.05 mi (0.080 km)	30 yd (27 m)
EF0	The first of three tornadoes to briefly occur at the same time. No damage occurred.						
EF0	NNW of Dupree (3rd tornado)	Ziebach	SD	45.09°N 101.64°W	00:53	0.05 mi (0.080 km)	30 yd (27 m)
EF0	The second of three tornadoes to briefly occur at the same time. No damage occurred.						
EF0	NNW of Dupree (3rd tornado)	Ziebach	SD	45.09°N 101.64°W	00:53	0.05 mi (0.080 km)	30 yd (27 m)
EF0	The third of three tornadoes to briefly occur at the same time. No damage occurred.						
EF0	NNW of Dupree (4th tornado)	Ziebach	SD	45.09°N 101.64°W	00:54	0.05 mi (0.080 km)	30 yd (27 m)
EF0	A brief tornado remained over open land.						
EF0	NNW of Dupree (5th tornado)	Ziebach	SD	45.09°N 101.64°W	00:56	0.05 mi (0.080 km)	30 yd (27 m)
EF0	This tornado caused no damage over rural terrain.						
EF0	NNW of Dupree (6th tornado)	Ziebach	SD	45.09°N 101.64°W	00:58	0.05 mi (0.080 km)	30 yd (27 m)
EF0	This small tornado occurred over open land.						
EF0	NNW of Dupree (7th tornado)	Ziebach	SD	45.09°N 101.64°W	00:58	0.05 mi (0.080 km)	30 yd (27 m)
EF0	A tornado occurred over open land, causing no damage.						
EF2	NE of Lantry to NW of Eagle Butte	Dewey	SD	45.06°N 101.33°W	01:35–01:38	0.4 mi (0.64 km)	50 yd (46 m)
EF2	This brief but strong tornado struck a farmstead, inflicting severe structural damage to two homes and destroying several pole barns. Multiple pieces of agricultural equipment were damaged and a horse was mortally wounded.						
EF1	SSW of Frazer	McCone	MT	47.9946°N 106.0854°W	02:56–03:04	2.61 mi (4.20 km)	17 yd (16 m)
EF1	This tornado snapped numerous trees and damaged metal storage sheds.						

=== June 17 event ===
List of confirmed tornadoes – Thursday, June 17, 2010
EF#	Location	County / Parish	State	Start Coord.	Time (UTC)	Path length	Max width
EF1	Southern Hettinger	Adams	ND	45.9918°N 102.6418°W	16:35–16:40	0.62 mi (1.00 km)	20 yd (18 m)
EF1	This tornado formed just outside of Hettinger and crossed Mirror Lake, where it picked up water before moving into the south side of the city. As it moved through Hettinger, tree branches were broken, windows were shattered at an apartment building, and an automobile was damaged. One vehicle with two occupants was briefly lifted a few inches off the ground and dropped back down as the narrow tornado passed overhead and quickly lifted. No injuries were reported.						
EF0	W of Larson	Burke	ND	48.89°N 102.92°W	19:31–19:42	3.48 mi (5.60 km)	25 yd (23 m)
EF0	A tornado occurred over open country and caused no damage.						
EF0	NNE of Streeter to SE of Medina	Stutsman	ND	46.7971°N 99.2611°W	19:35–20:03	2.76 mi (4.44 km)	25 yd (23 m)
EF0	A tornado touched down over rural land. No damage was reported.						
EF0	SE of Twin Valley	Norman	MN	47.22°N 96.2°W	20:28–20:30	1 mi (1.6 km)	25 yd (23 m)
EF0	A weak tornado snapped several tree limbs in a cemetery.						
EF0	E of Sharon	Steele	ND	47.58°N 97.8°W	20:38–20:45	4.32 mi (6.95 km)	30 yd (27 m)
EF0	An off-duty NWS employee observed a tornado that remained over open fields and rangeland.						
EF4	SE of Urbank to NE of New York Mills	Douglas, Otter Tail	MN	46.087°N 95.437°W	20:43–21:45	39.56 mi (63.67 km)	2,288 yd (2,092 m)
EF4	1 death – See section on this tornado – 5 people were injured.						
EF0	NNE of Pingree	Stutsman	ND	47.1905°N 98.8899°W	20:44–20:47	0.4 mi (0.64 km)	25 yd (23 m)
EF0	This brief tornado remained over open country.						
EF4	NNE of Mayville to W of Thompson	Traill, Grand Forks	ND	47.54°N 97.3°W	20:49–21:18	17 mi (27 km)	150 yd (140 m)
EF4	See section on this tornado – One person was injured.						
EF0	E of Vergas	Otter Tail	MN	46.67°N 95.75°W	20:55–20:56	0.2 mi (0.32 km)	15 yd (14 m)
EF0	A brief tornado occurred near Rose Lake.						
EF0	E of Bejou to SW of Fosston	Mahnomen, Polk	MN	46.67°N 95.75°W	21:00–21:10	6 mi (9.7 km)	40 yd (37 m)
EF0	This tornado downed several trees in shelterbelts.						
EF1	NE of Sanborn to SE of Rogers	Barnes	ND	47.01°N 98.11°W	21:01–21:03	1 mi (1.6 km)	100 yd (91 m)
EF1	This tornado snapped a wooden power pole, knocked down several poplar trees, and shredded a portion of an old corn field.						
EF0	WSW of Dazey	Barnes	ND	47.17°N 98.23°W	21:05–21:05	0.2 mi (0.32 km)	15 yd (14 m)
EF0	A brief tornado occurred in an open field.						
EF0	SW of Tokio	Eddy, Benson	ND	47.83°N 98.88°W	21:27–21:28	1.2 mi (1.9 km)	15 yd (14 m)
EF0	A tornado tracked over open rangeland.						
EF2	WSW of Hope to SSE of Finley	Steele	ND	47.31°N 97.78°W	21:28–21:38	7 mi (11 km)	75 yd (69 m)
EF2	This strong tornado produced significant tree damage to shelterbelts and in fields.						
EF1	WNW of Colgate to NE of Hope	Steele	ND	47.25°N 97.67°W	21:30–21:39	7 mi (11 km)	50 yd (46 m)
EF1	This tornado tossed and twisted a center pivot irrigation system and damaged trees in shelterbelts.						
EF2	SE of Emerado to NE of Mekinock	Grand Forks	ND	47.9°N 97.3°W	21:31–21:42	7 mi (11 km)	100 yd (91 m)
EF2	A strong tornado destroyed a pole barn and several farm outbuildings. Multiple large trees were snapped or uprooted as well.						
EF1	S of Zerkel	Clearwater	MN	47.18°N 97.3°W	21:32–21:34	1 mi (1.6 km)	40 yd (37 m)
EF1	This tornado snapped large trees and downed numerous large tree limbs.						
EF2	ENE of Hope	Steele	ND	47.35°N 97.62°W	21:40–21:45	3 mi (4.8 km)	75 yd (69 m)
EF2	A strong tornado severely damaged numerous trees in shelterbelts, destroyed an abandoned farmhouse and damaged farm outbuildings.						
EF1	WNW of Zerkel to SE of Rice Lake	Clearwater	MN	47.34°N 95.49°W	21:41–21:46	3 mi (4.8 km)	30 yd (27 m)
EF1	A tornado tore some shingles, gutters and trim pieces off of a house. Numerous large tree limbs were downed and several trees were snapped or uprooted.						
EF1	NW of Grand Forks to SW of Manvel	Grand Forks	ND	47.96°N 97.21°W	21:47–22:04	10 mi (16 km)	50 yd (46 m)
EF1	This tornado collapsed a pole barn and uprooted and snapped trees.						
EF1	WSW of Hewitt	Otter Tail	MN	46.2963°N 95.23°W	21:48–21:50	1.52 mi (2.45 km)	40 yd (37 m)
EF1	See section on this tornado						
EF4	Wadena to SSE of Sebeka	Otter Tail, Wadena	MN	46.41°N 95.18°W	21:59–22:16	10 mi (16 km)	1,936 yd (1,770 m)
EF4	See article on this tornado – 20 people were injured.						
EF0	W of Hatton	Steele	ND	47.63°N 97.57°W	22:02–22:05	2.98 mi (4.80 km)	50 yd (46 m)
EF0	Several tree tops were snapped by this weak tornado.						
EF0	NW of Elmore to SSW of Blue Earth	Faribault	MN	43.5331°N 94.148°W	22:05–22:10	2.65 mi (4.26 km)	75 yd (69 m)
EF0	Storm chasers recorded a tornado which damaged a metal shed building and uprooted multiple trees.						
EF1	SSE of Goodridge	Pennington	MN	48.1°N 95.78°W	22:10–22:13	2 mi (3.2 km)	30 yd (27 m)
EF1	An intermittent tornado downed several large tree limbs, snapped some smaller trees and shifted heavy farm machinery.						
EF0	W of Lakota	Kossuth	IA	43.3737°N 94.1649°W	22:11–22:12	0.69 mi (1.11 km)	20 yd (18 m)
EF0	A brief tornado touched down and did no damage.						
EF0	N of Dahlen	Nelson	ND	48.16°N 97.97°W	22:15–22:19	3 mi (4.8 km)	25 yd (23 m)
EF0	Several large branches and tree limbs were knocked down in shelterbelts.						
EF1	W of Lake George	Hubbard	MN	47.16°N 95.15°W	22:17–22:26	6 mi (9.7 km)	80 yd (73 m)
EF1	This tornado downed numerous large trees and tree limbs.						
EF1	N of Oslo, MN	Walsh (ND), Marshall (MN)	ND, MN	48.25°N 97.16°W	22:21–22:29	5 mi (8.0 km)	50 yd (46 m)
EF1	Numerous tree were snapped or uprooted in and around the Red River of the North valley.						
EF0	S of Inkster	Grand Forks	ND	48.08°N 97.64°W	22:22–22:24	1 mi (1.6 km)	25 yd (23 m)
EF0	A few large tree limbs were broken by this tornado as it moved northward over open fields.						
EF0	NW of Winsted	McLeod	MN	44.9689°N 94.0823°W	22:23–22:26	0.78 mi (1.26 km)	25 yd (23 m)
EF0	This weak tornado broke some trees, tipped over a gravity box and did minor crop damage.						
EF0	SE of Elmore, MN	Kossuth	IA	43.457°N 94.0286°W	22:24–22:25	0.67 mi (1.08 km)	20 yd (18 m)
EF0	This tornado was observed briefly. No damage occurred.						
EF1	S of Clearbrook	Clearwater	MN	47.64°N 95.43°W	22:29–22:31	1 mi (1.6 km)	40 yd (37 m)
EF1	This tornado downed several trees onto powerlines and snapped one power pole.						
EF0	S of Nimrod to S of Oshawa	Wadena, Cass	MN	46.61°N 94.88°W	22:30–22:48	14.76 mi (23.75 km)	200 yd (180 m)
EF0	See section on this tornado						
EF0	WSW of Thompson to SW of Grand Forks	Grand Forks	ND	47.76°N 97.15°W	22:30–22:43	8 mi (13 km)	30 yd (27 m)
EF0	An intermittent weak tornado broke large tree branches in shelterbelts and near homes.						
EF1	SW of Inkster	Grand Forks	ND	48.09°N 97.69°W	22:35–22:42	4 mi (6.4 km)	75 yd (69 m)
EF1	Several large trees were snapped or uprooted.						
EF0	NNW of St. Clair to S of Eagle Lake	Blue Earth	MN	44.1002°N 93.8794°W	22:37–22:42	3.02 mi (4.86 km)	50 yd (46 m)
EF0	This weak tornado broke two dozen trees, bent a flag pole, inflicted minor damage to sheds, and blew out the windows to a house.						
EF0	NW of Gilby	Grand Forks	ND	48.09°N 97.48°W	22:37–22:40	2 mi (3.2 km)	25 yd (23 m)
EF0	A tornado remained over open fields.						
EF0	NE of Elmore to SSW of Marna	Faribault	MN	43.5275°N 94.0344°W	22:40–22:44	1.73 mi (2.78 km)	20 yd (18 m)
EF0	Storm chasers recorded this tornado as it broke dozens of trees.						
EF1	W of Fordville	Walsh	ND	48.2°N 97.85°W	22:41–22:45	2 mi (3.2 km)	50 yd (46 m)
EF1	Multiple trees were snapped or uprooted.						
EF1	N of Grygla	Marshall, Roseau	MN	48.46°N 95.62°W	22:44–22:51	4 mi (6.4 km)	40 yd (37 m)
EF1	This tornado knocked down or snapped several large trees.						
EF0	WSW of Kabekona	Hubbard	MN	47.2°N 94.91°W	22:48–22:54	4 mi (6.4 km)	30 yd (27 m)
EF0	A tornado downed several tree branches.						
EF0	SSW of Laporte	Hubbard	MN	47.15°N 94.8°W	22:49–22:51	1 mi (1.6 km)	30 yd (27 m)
EF0	Multiple tree branches were snapped by this tornado.						
EF1	NNW of Fisher to WSW of Key West	Polk	MN	47.84°N 96.82°W	22:50–23:00	7 mi (11 km)	150 yd (140 m)
EF1	An off-duty SPC employee observed a tornado that damaged farm buildings and snapped or uprooted numerous trees.						
EF0	NE of Clear Lake	Sherburne	MN	45.4874°N 93.9612°W	22:54–22:55	0.06 mi (0.097 km)	10 yd (9.1 m)
EF0	A storm chaser recorded a tornado that briefly touched down and lifted.						
EF0	NE of Clear Lake to NW of Briggs Lake	Sherburne	MN	45.4836°N 93.9543°W	22:56–23:00	2.54 mi (4.09 km)	30 yd (27 m)
EF0	A weak tornado snapped a few dozen trees.						
EF1	N of Buffalo to SW of Monticello	Wright	MN	45.201°N 93.868°W	23:00–23:08	5.13 mi (8.26 km)	50 yd (46 m)
EF1	This tornado produced isolated tree damage near its initial touchdown, with a few trees damaged early in its path. As it approached Constance Lake, the damage became more concentrated and more intense as multiple tree trunks were snapped on both sides of the lake. Farther north, the tornado weakened but continued to cause intermittent damage, including additional tree damage and the destruction of a small lean-to shelter. The tornado then dissipated shortly afterward as the damage path faded.						
EF1	E of Crookston	Polk	MN	47.78°N 96.49°W	23:00–23:04	3 mi (4.8 km)	150 yd (140 m)
EF1	A tornado caused significant farm damage by tearing a 5,000-bushel steel grain bin off its concrete pad and throwing it approximately half a mile into a nearby field. Along the remainder of its path, several trees were snapped or uprooted within a shelterbelt, and shingles were stripped from the roof of a house, indicating strong localized winds.						
EF0	SW of Bricelyn	Faribault	MN	43.5097°N 93.8644°W	23:05–23:08	0.94 mi (1.51 km)	30 yd (27 m)
EF0	This tornado moved across open fields, causing no damage.						
EF0	E of Rake	Winnebago	IA	43.4896°N 93.8661°W	23:05–23:06	1.53 mi (2.46 km)	30 yd (27 m)
EF0	A cone tornado was briefly observed over open farmland.						
EF0	SSE of Warren	Polk	MN	48.09°N 96.71°W	23:06–23:10	2 mi (3.2 km)	75 yd (69 m)
EF0	A farmstead received minor shingle damage and several large tree limbs were snapped.						
EF0	SW of Bricelyn	Faribault	MN	43.5253°N 93.8356°W	23:10–23:11	0.4 mi (0.64 km)	30 yd (27 m)
EF0	This tornado was recorded by storm chasers as it tracked through open fields, causing no damage.						
EF2	SW of Kiester	Faribault	MN	43.5129°N 93.7331°W	23:13–23:18	1.46 mi (2.35 km)	50 yd (46 m)
EF2	A strong tornado moved through rural areas before dissipating. Along its path, multiple farmsteads were heavily damaged, with several grain bins destroyed and numerous trees damaged or removed. The tornado briefly interacted with the 2316 UTC EF2 tornado, wrapping around it before weakening and lifting.						
EF3	ENE of Maple Bay to Mentor to ENE of Terrebonne	Polk, Red Lake	MN	47.64°N 96.18°W	23:15–23:36	15 mi (24 km)	150 yd (140 m)
EF3	1 death – This intense tornado began in Polk County and tracked northeast for into Red Lake County, producing significant to severe damage along its path. Numerous trees were sheared off or uprooted, and power poles were snapped as the tornado moved toward and through the community of Mentor. Roofs and garages were destroyed, and multiple farm buildings were blown down near the county line. A convenience store and gas station along US 2 were flattened. As the tornado crossed Maple Lake, it caused widespread damage to cabins, campers, boats, and docks, with debris lofted well beyond nearby communities. Additional debris was carried far northeast of Mentor before the tornado finally dissipated. Two injuries also occurred.						
EF2	Northwestern Kiester	Faribault	MN	43.5314°N 93.7229°W	23:16–23:25	2.5 mi (4.0 km)	50 yd (46 m)
EF2	This strong tornado developed just west of Kiester and moved north into the northwestern edge of the town, where it produced widespread tree damage. As it continued north, the tornado became multi-vortex and intensified, causing EF-2 damage within a grove of trees where numerous trees were heavily damaged. Farther along the path, additional trees and gravestones were knocked over in a cemetery. The tornado then turned toward the north-northeast and weakened before dissipating to the northeast of Kiester.						
EF1	ENE of Dorothy	Red Lake	MN	47.93°N 96.38°W	23:16–23:19	2 mi (3.2 km)	50 yd (46 m)
EF1	A tornado blew a parked semi tractor-trailer off a county highway, injuring the driver.						
EF0	E of Kiester	Faribault	MN	43.5365°N 93.6631°W	23:23–23:24	0.26 mi (0.42 km)	50 yd (46 m)
EF0	A brief tornado moved across open fields.						
EF1	N of Radium to W of Newfolden	Marshall	MN	48.27°N 96.64°W	23:26–23:36	7 mi (11 km)	200 yd (180 m)
EF1	This tornado produced widespread tree damage as numerous trees were snapped within shelterbelts along its path. Near Old Mill State Park, the tornado tore the roof off a small shed, scattering debris nearby. In surrounding agricultural areas, row crops exhibited ground scouring, indicating strong localized winds before the tornado dissipated.						
EF1	W of Mansfield	Faribault, Freeborn	MN	43.5692°N 93.6512°W	23:28–23:31	0.58 mi (0.93 km)	50 yd (46 m)
EF1	A brief tornado moved across open fields and groves of trees. Along its path, numerous power poles were snapped about five feet above the ground, and several dozen trees lost large branches. The tornado was photographed and captured on video by storm chasers as it progressed through the area.						
EF4	W of Mansfield to W of Hartland	Freeborn	MN	43.5755°N 93.6404°W	23:33–00:15	16.91 mi (27.21 km)	1,760 yd (1,610 m)
EF4	1 death – See article on this tornado – 14 people were injured.						
EF1	Armstrong	Freeborn	MN	43.6607°N 93.4748°W	23:55–23:59	1.07 mi (1.72 km)	100 yd (91 m)
EF1	This satellite tornado to the 2333 UTC EF4 tornado damaged several grain bins, structures and trees.						
EF3	NW of Albert Lea to S of Lemond	Freeborn, Steele	MN	43.702°N 93.4188°W	00:05–00:44	18.15 mi (29.21 km)	1,320 yd (1,210 m)
EF3	This intense tornado caused a concentrated swath of severe damage as it moved across rural areas, impacting multiple farmsteads along its path. Several homes sustained major structural damage, including one house that was completely destroyed and others that lost large portions of their roofs. Numerous outbuildings were destroyed, with debris scattered across surrounding fields. Hundreds of trees were uprooted or snapped, and some were partially debarked. As the tornado continued into Steele County and changed direction, it maintained a damaging circulation that inflicted additional heavy damage to homes and farm structures before gradually weakening and dissipating.						
EF1	E of Clarks Grove to Geneva to SW of Litomysl	Freeborn, Steele	MN	43.7634°N 93.3179°W	00:15–00:48	12.59 mi (20.26 km)	600 yd (550 m)
EF1	A tornado touched down near I-35, destroying multiple outbuildings and snapping or toppling numerous large trees as it moved northward. After leaving the area near Geneva, it continued into the Steele County, where additional outbuildings were destroyed, a barn lost its roof, and widespread tree damage persisted. The tornado gradually curved to the north-northwest before weakening and dissipating.						
EF1	NE of Albert Lea to W of Hollandale	Freeborn	MN	43.6987°N 93.2945°W	00:42–00:48	4.94 mi (7.95 km)	220 yd (200 m)
EF1	This tornado destroyed a barn, broke dozens of trees, and damaged a few sheds.						
EF3	W of Hollandale to E of Geneva	Freeborn	MN	43.7567°N 93.2367°W	00:47–00:59	5.01 mi (8.06 km)	600 yd (550 m)
EF3	This intense tornado formed west of Hollandale and quickly caused significant damage, completely obliterating a farmstead where nearly all outbuildings were destroyed and the farmhouse was leveled. As it tracked northeast, the tornado tore the roof off another house and destroyed a greenhouse. Near the end of its path, it struck an additional farmstead, damaging several outbuildings, causing minor damage to a residence, and uprooting or snapping a couple dozen trees.						
EF1	E of Geneva to SW of Blooming Prairie	Freeborn	MN	43.8103°N 93.1627°W	01:03–01:07	2.16 mi (3.48 km)	220 yd (200 m)
EF1	A tornado formed and tracked northeast through rural areas. Early in its path, it struck several farmsteads, snapping numerous trees and destroying a shed along with other outbuildings. As it continued northeast, the tornado moved primarily through open fields and groves, producing additional crop damage and breaking more trees. Damage became more sporadic toward the end of the track as the tornado weakened and eventually lifted.						
EF0	NE of Haypoint	Aitkin	MN	46.9134°N 93.5919°W	01:05–01:06	0.69 mi (1.11 km)	25 yd (23 m)
EF0	A weak tornado briefly touched down and caused minimal damage.						
EF3	WSW of Blooming Prairie to SSE of Bixby	Steele	MN	43.8588°N 93.1273°W	01:10–01:19	4.32 mi (6.95 km)	440 yd (400 m)
EF3	This intense tornado began and moved northeast, initially causing sporadic damage by breaking a few trees. As it reached a farm along MN 30 west of Blooming Prairie, damage increased, with additional tree damage and impacts to agricultural property. The tornado continued northeast, severely damaging crops, including areas where bean fields were scoured. It then intensified even further to the northwest of Blooming Prairie, where a house was completely leveled, trees were snapped with large sections of bark stripped away, and a pickup truck was lofted and deposited into the home’s basement. Nearby homes sustained lesser damage such as roof and exterior impacts. The tornado weakened and dissipated just west of US 218.						
EF2	NW of Blooming Prairie to WNW of Hayfield	Steele, Dodge	MN	43.8947°N 93.0903°W	01:25–01:40	6.61 mi (10.64 km)	100 yd (91 m)
EF2	A strong tornado touched down and tracked east-northeast, crossing the earlier damage path left by a stronger tornado from minutes before. Early in its path, a manufactured home was completely destroyed, and a woman inside was thrown roughly 20 ft (6.1 m) before being rescued alive, but injured, from the debris. As the tornado continued east-northeast, multiple outbuildings were destroyed and numerous trees were snapped or blown down. The tornado then moved into Dodge County, where it continued to cause damage across rural areas northeast of Blooming Prairie. In this area, roofs were partially torn off buildings and additional tree damage was observed before the tornado dissipated.						
EF0	N of Blooming Prairie to NE of Bixby	Steele, Dodge	MN	43.8965°N 93.0529°W	01:27–01:35	5.49 mi (8.84 km)	50 yd (46 m)
EF0	A weak tornado caused minor damage to outbuildings and several dozen trees.						
EF2	NW of Benson, WI to NW of Grantsburg, WI	Chisago (MN), Pine (MN), Burnett (WI)	MN, WI	45.7277°N 92.8743°W	01:44–02:05	7.82 mi (12.59 km)	400 yd (370 m)
EF2	This strong tornado touched down in extreme northern Chisago County, uprooting trees and snapping large branches before moving northeast into Pine County. As it intensified, the tornado caused increasingly severe damage, including widespread tree snapping and uprooting across mostly recreational land along the St. Croix River Valley. The most intense damage occurred in far southeastern Pine County, where the tornado destroyed a strapped-down mobile home, injuring two occupants. Numerous trees were snapped or uprooted where the tornado crossed Minnesota State Highway 70, and multiple nearby homes sustained significant structural damage. Continuing northeast, the tornado crossed the St. Croix River into Wisconsin, where damage became less severe but still included significant tree damage and damage to at least one home. The tornado ultimately lifted in rural area.						
EF1	Northern Rochester	Olmsted	MN	44.0649°N 92.5395°W	02:03–02:10	2.38 mi (3.83 km)	150 yd (140 m)
EF1	A tornado produced intermittent damage as it tracked through the north side of Rochester. The tornado moved through residential neighborhoods, damaging numerous homes, with at least one residence destroyed and many others sustaining roof and structural damage. The most significant non-residential impact occurred when the tornado struck a large retail store, causing extensive damage to the building. Overall, media reports indicated that at least thirty homes were damaged along the tornado’s path before it dissipated.						
EF0	NW of Grantsburg	Burnett	WI	45.806°N 92.752°W	02:05–02:06	0.31 mi (0.50 km)	200 yd (180 m)
EF0	A brief tornado occurred and caused no damage.						
EF1	N of Cream	Buffalo	WI	44.32°N 91.79°W	02:57–03:01	2.28 mi (3.67 km)	25 yd (23 m)
EF1	This tornado caused minor damage to a few buildings and snapped several large tree branches.						

=== June 18 event ===
List of confirmed tornadoes – Friday, June 18, 2010
EF#	Location	County / Parish	State	Start Coord.	Time (UTC)	Path length	Max width
EF0	N of St. Charles	Madison	IA	41.3179°N 93.8068°W	21:55–21:56	0.59 mi (0.95 km)	25 yd (23 m)
EF0	A tornado caused no damage.						

=== June 19 event ===
List of reported tornadoes - Saturday, June 19, 2010
EF#	Location	County	Coord.	Time (UTC)	Path length	Comments/Damage
Kansas
EF1	NE of Randall	Jewell	39.66°N 97.99°W	2330	1 mile (1.6 km)	A house was damaged and a garage, barn and grain bins were destroyed. Trees were also damaged.
Sources: NCDC Storm Data

=== June 20 event (Plains) ===
List of reported tornadoes - Sunday, June 20, 2010
EF#	Location	County	Coord.	Time (UTC)	Path length	Comments/Damage
Kansas
EF0	NW of Modoc	Scott	38.51°N 101.11°W	2025	1 mile (1.6 km)	Brief landspout tornado with no damage.
EF0	WNW of Modoc	Scott	38.49°N 101.12°W	2043	unknown	Brief landspout tornado with no damage.
EF0	SSE of Esbon	Jewell	39.78°N 98.40°W	0020	unknown	Brief tornado touchdown with no damage.
Montana
EF2	Billings	Yellowstone	45.80°N 108.47°W	2224	0.5 miles (800 m)	See article on this tornado – One person was injured.
Wyoming
EF0	SE of Chugwater	Platte	41.71°N 104.79°W	2226	7 miles (11 km)	Tornado remained over open country.
EF0	WSW of Bill	Converse	43.15°N 105.55°W	2320	unknown	Brief tornado touchdown with no damage.
Nebraska
EF2	Superior	Nuckolls	40.02°N 98.07°W	0050	1 mile (1.6 km)	Brief but very large tornado destroyed a warehouse, damaged houses and trees and tossed railroad cars.
South Dakota
EF0	Wall	Pennington	44.00°N 102.25°W	2357	unknown	A hangar was destroyed and airplanes were damaged at Wall Municipal Airport by a brief tornado. Trees were also damaged in town.
Sources: NWS Hastings, NWS Billings, NWS Rapid City, NCDC Storm Data

=== June 20 event (Southeast) ===
List of reported tornadoes - Sunday, June 20, 2010
EF#	Location	County	Coord.	Time (UTC)	Path length	Comments/Damage
Florida
EF0	E of Bridgeport	Putnam	29.76°N 81.55°W	2055	3 miles (4.8 km)	A waterspout developed along the St. Johns River with no damage.
Sources: NCDC Storm Data

=== June 21 event ===
List of reported tornadoes - Monday, June 21, 2010
EF#	Location	County	Coord.	Time (UTC)	Path length	Comments/Damage
North Dakota
EF0	ENE of Oakwood	Walsh	48.44°N 97.19°W	1937	2 miles (3.2 km)	Tornado remained over open country.
EF0	N of Northwood	Grand Forks	47.77°N 97.69°W	2055	7 miles (11 km)	Intermittent tornado with minor tree damage.
Minnesota
EF0	NW of Stephen	Marshall	48.41°N 97.14°W	1949	10 miles (16 km)	Intermittent tornado with minor tree damage.
EF0	SW of Florian	Marshall	48.43°N 96.69°W	2059	2 miles (3.2 km)	Several poplar trees were blown down.
EF0	W of Newfolden	Marshall	48.36°N 96.42°W	2130	2 miles (3.2 km)	Intermittent brief tornado touchdowns.
EF0	NW of Red Lake	Beltrami	47.95°N 95.02°W	2300	unknown	Brief waterspouts over Lower Red Lake with no damage.
Iowa
EF0	E of Bentonsport	Van Buren	40.72°N 91.80°W	2125	unknown	Brief tornado touchdown with no damage.
EF0	N of Fort Madison	Lee	40.68°N 91.35°W	2221	unknown	Brief tornado touchdown with no damage.
Illinois
EF0	SW of Melvin	Ford	40.55°N 88.25°W	2158	unknown	Brief tornado touchdown with no damage.
EF0	WNW of East Lynn	Vermilion	40.47°N 87.80°W	2322	unknown	Brief tornado touchdown with no damage.
EF0	SW of Cissna Park	Iroquois	40.50°N 87.89°W	2324	unknown	Brief rain-wrapped tornado with no damage.
EF0	NW of Rossville	Vermilion	40.40°N 87.70°W	0002	1 mile (1.6 km)	Brief tornado touchdown with no damage.
EF0	E of Industry	McDonough	40.32°N 90.56°W	0030	1 mile (1.6 km)	A roof was blown off a barn.
Colorado
EF0	NNE of Bijou	Morgan	40.26°N 103.82°W	2254	unknown	Brief tornado touchdown with no damage.
EF0	W of Dodd	Morgan	40.26°N 103.72°W	2303	unknown	Brief tornado touchdown with no damage.
EF0	E of Pinneo	Washington	40.22°N 103.38°W	2356	unknown	Brief tornado touchdown with no damage.
EF1	SW of Vernon	Yuma	40.22°N 103.38°W	0110	12 miles (19 km)	A small auditorium lost its roof and numerous trailers were heavily damaged. Trees, power poles and farm equipment were also damaged.
Wisconsin
EF1	W of Wiota	Lafayette	42.65°N 89.86°W	0039	2.2 miles (3.5 km)	One house sustained minor damage and trees were uprooted.
EF1	Cross Plains	Dane	43.11°N 89.65°W	0041	0.3 miles (480 m)	Brief tornado with major tree damage and a few shingles removed from houses.
EF1	Busseyville	Jefferson	42.89°N 89.00°W	0115	1 mile (1.6 km)	About 30 houses sustained damage, one of which was heavily damaged by a fallen tree.
EF2	Eagle area	Waukesha	42.88°N 88.47°W	0211	5 miles (8.0 km)	8 houses were destroyed and about 300 other houses were damaged, many of them severely. A horse ranch was also heavily damaged and 18 other businesses sustained minor damage. Thousands of trees were also knocked down and vehicles were thrown by the tornado. About 15 people were injured.
EF1	Muskego area	Waukesha	42.89°N 88.12°W	0236	6 miles (9.7 km)	Minor damage to many houses and businesses and many trees were damaged. Tornado embedded in larger downburst with winds up to 100 mph (160 km/h).
Kansas
EF0	E of Angelus	Sheridan	39.17°N 100.54°W	0245	1 mile (1.6 km)	Tornado remained over open country.
Sources: NWS Milwaukee, NWS Grand Forks, NCDC Storm Data

=== June 22 event (Northeast) ===
List of reported tornadoes - Tuesday, June 22, 2010
EF#	Location	County	Coord.	Time (UTC)	Path length	Comments/Damage
Pennsylvania
EF0	South Annville	Lebanon	40.28°N 76.58°W	2030	200 yards (180 m)	Brief tornado embedded in a downburst with tree damage at a local campground.
EF1	Windham	Bradford	41.99°N 76.36°W	0030	1.7 miles (2.7 km)	Over 100 trees were damaged, some of which fell on houses. A camper was also flipped.
Sources: NWS Binghamton, NWS State College, NCDC Storm Data

=== June 22 event (Plains) ===
List of reported tornadoes - Tuesday, June 22, 2010
EF#	Location	County	Coord.	Time (UTC)	Path length	Comments/Damage
Nebraska
EF0	S of Harrisburg (1st tornado)	Banner	41.48°N 103.75°W	2242	1 mile (1.6 km)	Tornado remained over open country.
EF0	S of Harrisburg (2nd tornado)	Banner	41.51°N 103.75°W	2306	1 mile (1.6 km)	Tornado remained over open country.
EF0	ESE of Harrisburg	Banner	41.49°N 103.55°W	2318	1 mile (1.6 km)	Tornado remained over open country.
EF0	WSW of Rushville	Sheridan	42.70°N 102.48°W	0020	unknown	Brief tornado reported by a sheriff in an open field.
Wyoming
EF0	WNW of Osage	Weston	44.00°N 104.45°W	2338	unknown	Brief tornado touchdown with no damage.
Iowa
EF0	SE of Unique	Humboldt	42.70°N 94.34°W	0112	1 mile (1.6 km)	Damage limited to a few crops.
EF0	WNW of Lytton	Sac	42.45°N 94.92°W	0115	1 mile (1.6 km)	Damage limited to a few crops.
EF0	W of Eagle Grove	Wright	42.68°N 93.94°W	0125	2 miles (3.2 km)	Damage limited to a few crops.
EF0	S of Marcus	Cherokee	42.81°N 95.79°W	0210	1 mile (1.6 km)	Tornado remained over open country.
EF0	SSW of Paullina	O'Brien	42.93°N 95.68°W	0225	unknown	Brief tornado touchdown with no damage.
Sources: NCDC Storm Data

=== June 23 event ===
List of reported tornadoes - Wednesday, June 23, 2010
EF#	Location	County	Coord.	Time (UTC)	Path length	Comments/Damage
Iowa
EF1	W of Tripoli	Bremer	42.80°N 92.31°W	0718	500 yards (460 m)	Brief tornado destroyed an abandoned barn. Tornado embedded in larger microburst with more significant damage.
Wisconsin
EF0	W of Gays Mills	Crawford	43.33°N 90.73°W	0822	3.5 miles (5.6 km)	An outbuilding was damaged and many trees were snapped.
Illinois
EF1	Matteson	Cook	41.51°N 87.74°W	2326	2.5 miles (4.0 km)	A few houses and garages sustained minor damage. Trees were uprooted or snapped.
Indiana
EF1	E of Wakarusa	Elkhart	41.54°N 86.00°W	0059	12 miles (19 km)	An industrial plant was heavily damaged. A barn was destroyed and numerous trees were uprooted.
EF1	Goshen	Elkhart	41.58°N 85.83°W	0109	1 mile (1.6 km)	Brief tornado near Parkside Elementary School damaged a few trees and removed the roof from an industrial buildings.
EF1	Warsaw	Kosciusko	41.24°N 85.85°W	0114	4.5 miles (7.2 km)	Several houses were damaged along with an apartment block and an Advance Auto Parts store. Trees were blown down at a cemetery.
EF1	SW of Middlebury	Elkhart	41.51°N 85.74°W	0115	3 miles (4.8 km)	Many trees were knocked down, a few of which landed on houses.
EF0	SW of Middlebury	Elkhart	41.65°N 85.72°W	0116	unknown	Brief tornado heavily damaged a milking barn.
EF0	SW of Millersburg	Elkhart	41.53°N 85.69°W	0117	2 miles (3.2 km)	A barn sustained significant damage and trees were snapped.
Michigan
EF0	SE of Saline	Washtenaw	42.13°N 83.75°W	0152	3.5 miles (5.6 km)	Numerous trees were damaged.
EF1	S of Milan	Monroe	42.06°N 83.68°W	0206	11.5 miles (18.5 km)	Several houses sustained roof and shingle damage. A pole barn was destroyed and many trees were damaged.
Ohio
EF0	S of Van Wert	Van Wert	40.81°N 84.59°W	0250	1.2 miles (1.9 km)	Four houses sustained minor damage and a barn lost its roof.
Sources: SPC Storm Reports for 06/23/10, NWS Des Moines, NWS Northern Indiana, NWS Detroit, NWS La Crosse, NCDC Storm Data

=== June 24 event (Northeast) ===
List of reported tornadoes - Thursday, June 24, 2010
EF#	Location	County	Coord.	Time (UTC)	Path length	Comments/Damage
Connecticut
EF1	Bridgeport	Fairfield	41.19°N 73.20°W	1825	0.15 miles (240 m)	Brief tornado embedded in widespread straight-line wind damage in the downtown area. Significant damage to several buildings and houses and many trees were knocked down. Three people were injured.
Sources: NWS New York, NCDC Storm Data

=== June 24 event (Plains) ===
List of reported tornadoes - Thursday, June 24, 2010
EF#	Location	County	Coord.	Time (UTC)	Path length	Comments/Damage
North Dakota
EF0	E of Forest River	Walsh	48.22°N 97.44°W	2126	3 miles (4.8 km)	Damage limited to a few tree limbs.
Sources: NCDC Storm Data

=== June 25 event ===
List of reported tornadoes - Friday, June 25, 2010
EF#	Location	County	Coord.	Time (UTC)	Path length	Comments/Damage
Tennessee
EF0	Bolivar	Hardeman	35.27°N 89.02°W	2057	1 mile (1.6 km)	Several businesses were damaged in town.
North Dakota
EF1	SW of Mandan	Morton	46.73°N 100.99°W	2155	2 miles (3.2 km)	Grain bins were destroyed and crops were damaged.
EF0	W of Linton	Emmons	46.24°N 100.52°W	2235	unknown	Brief tornado touchdown with no damage.
Minnesota
EF2	NW of New Ulm	Brown	44.33°N 94.49°W	2255	0.125 miles (200 m)	Brief tornado destroyed a barn and a metal silo on a farm.
EF2	Courtland area	Nicollet	44.27°N 94.34°W	2330	5 miles (8.0 km)	Several farm buildings were damaged, including a barn which was destroyed. Many trees and power poles were also damaged.
EF1	E of Revere	Redwood	44.23°N 95.36°W	2355	2.5 miles (4.0 km)	A house sustained minor damage and two sheds and a grain bin were destroyed.
EF2	W of Rapidan	Blue Earth	44.09°N 94.13°W	2355	1 mile (1.6 km)	A barn and a garage were destroyed.
EF1	SE of Lake Crystal	Blue Earth	44.09°N 94.21°W	2358	4 miles (6.4 km)	A few barns, sheds and outbuildings were destroyed and extensive tree damage.
EF2	NE of Good Thunder	Blue Earth	43.99°N 94.03°W	0005	2 miles (3.2 km)	Several hog barns were damaged, one of which was destroyed.
EF0	N of Storden	Cottonwood	44.20°N 95.30°W	0005	unknown	Brief tornado touchdown with no damage.
EF0	E of Rapidan	Blue Earth	44.09°N 94.02°W	0009	unknown	Brief tornado in a heavily wooded area damaged many trees.
EF0	Hartland	Freeborn	43.80°N 93.49°W	0119	1 mile (1.6 km)	A few sheds were destroyed and trees were snapped. A grain elevator was heavily damaged.
EF0	SSW of Fairmont	Martin	43.62°N 94.45°W	0138	unknown	A barn sustained minor damage and a few trees were snapped.
Nebraska
EF0	WNW of Elsmere	Cherry	42.12°N 100.42°W	2300	1 mile (1.6 km)	Tornado remained over open country.
EF0	SW of Thedford	Thomas	41.79°N 100.83°W	0005	1 mile (1.6 km)	Tornado remained over open country.
Iowa
EF4	Sibley area	Lyon, Osceola	43.39°N 95.73°W	0253	14 miles (23 km)	One house was flattened and several others were severely damaged. Numerous farm buildings were destroyed or flattened and cars were picked up and thrown. Corn was scoured, power poles were knocked down and trees were debarked. 13 people were injured, including motorists on Highway 60.
EF1	S of Little Rock	Lyon	43.43°N 95.90°W	0255	1 mile (1.6 km)	Satellite tornado related to the Sibley wedge. A garage was destroyed and power poles were snapped.
EF0	SE of Ashton	Osceola	43.26°N 95.75°W	0345	unknown	Brief tornado touchdown with no damage.
EF0	SSW of Sheldon	Sioux	43.13°N 95.90°W	0353	unknown	Brief tornado touchdown with no damage.
EF0	NW of Philby	O'Brien	43.08°N 95.84°W	0405	1 mile (1.6 km)	Tornado remained over open country.
EF1	E of Germantown	O'Brien	42.96°N 95.76°W	0442	3 miles (4.8 km)	A house lost part of its roof and its chimney. Trees were also blown down.
Sources: NWS Sioux Falls, NWS Twin Cities, NCDC Storm Data

=== June 26 event ===
List of reported tornadoes - Saturday, June 26, 2010
EF#	Location	County	Coord.	Time (UTC)	Path length	Comments/Damage
North Dakota
EF1	E of Grafton	Walsh	48.42°N 97.32°W	2153	6 miles (9.7 km)	Steel bins were thrown, power poles were snapped and trees were knocked down.
South Dakota
EF0	NE of Wolf Creek	Hutchinson	43.42°N 97.53°W	2227	unknown	Brief tornado touchdown with no damage.
EF0	W of Carthage	Miner	44.16°N 97.72°W	2302	unknown	Brief rain-wrapped tornado with no damage.
Minnesota
EF1	SE of Luna	Marshall	48.22°N 96.71°W	2247	3 miles (4.8 km)	Two houses sustained roof damage and a few trees were damaged.
EF0	NW of Crookston	Polk	47.91°N 96.78°W	0145	8 miles (13 km)	Numerous trees and power poles were damaged.
EF0	N of Lexington	Le Sueur	44.48°N 93.69°W	0211	unknown	Brief tornado touchdown on a farm with several buildings damaged.
EF0	S of New Prague	Le Sueur	44.52°N 93.56°W	0220	1 mile (1.6 km)	Numerous houses sustained minor damage, and many trees were snapped.
EF0	NE of Guckeen	Faribault	43.68°N 94.14°W	0224	3 miles (4.8 km)	Two grain bins were destroyed, several sheds and a granary were damaged and many trees were snapped.
EF0	W of New Market	Scott	44.57°N 93.43°W	0235	1.5 miles (2.4 km)	A silo and several trees were damaged.
EF0	SW of Easton	Faribault	43.75°N 93.93°W	0238	0.5 miles (800 m)	A grain bin was destroyed and a maintenance shed was damaged.
EF0	W of Wells	Faribault	43.74°N 93.75°W	0247	0.75 miles (1.21 km)	Damage to a few stones in a cemetery and many trees were snapped.
Iowa
EF0	NE of Ocheyedan	Osceola	43.42°N 95.54°W	0112	unknown	Brief tornado touchdown with no damage.
EF0	SE of Ashton	Osceola	43.30°N 95.78°W	0115	unknown	Brief tornado touchdown with no damage.
Sources: SPC Storm Reports for 06/26/10, NWS Twin Cities, NCDC Storm Data

=== June 27 event ===
List of reported tornadoes - Sunday, June 27, 2010
EF#	Location	County	Coord.	Time (UTC)	Path length	Comments/Damage
Michigan
EF0	SSE of Gobles	Van Buren	42.34°N 85.85°W	1709	unknown	Two separate tracks confirmed due to tornado lifting. First one was 100 yards long and 50 yards wide. Second was 300 yards long and 50 yards wide.
EF1	N of Carleton	Wayne	42.11°N 83.40°W	1831	1.4 miles (2.3 km)	Touched down at Willow and Waltz Roads. Multiple homes had roof damage, two garages were destroyed, power lines down and other structural damage. Dissipated east of Rust Road.
EF1	W of Wadhams	St. Clair	42.99°N 82.58°W	2307	2.9 miles (4.7 km)	1 death - Tornado hit the Fort Trodd Family Campground site throwing campers around, of which 10 were damaged or destroyed. Four others were injured.
EF0	Marlette	Sanilac	43.32°N 83.07°W	0032	0.5 miles (800 m)	Shingles were blown off a house, a shed was destroyed and trees were snapped.
Wisconsin
EF1	W of Elmwood Park	Racine	42.69°N 87.84°W	1820	3 miles (4.8 km)	Trees were knocked down on Green Ridge and Southwood Drives. A police and a fire station were damaged and two trailers were flipped. One person was injured. Upgraded from EF0 to EF1 in post-analysis.
Ohio
EF1	Conneaut	Ashtabula	41.95°N 80.60°W	2254	2.3 miles (3.7 km)	Several houses and a garage sustained roof damage. Many trees were damaged.
Pennsylvania
EF0	Presque Isle	Erie	42.16°N 80.11°W	2336	250 yards (230 m)	Brief tornado knocked down about 50 trees and destroyed an observation deck.
Illinois
EF0	WNW of Shirley	Jefferson	38.22°N 88.85°W	0205	unknown	Brief tornado with minor damage to a horse barn.
New York
EF1	Paynesville area	Allegany, Steuben	42.01°N 77.77°W	0305	8 miles (13 km)	Three barns were destroyed and numerous trees and power poles were snapped.
Sources: SPC Storm Reports for 06/27/10, NWS Detroit, NWS Milwaukee, NWS Buffalo, NWS Cleveland, NCDC Storm Data

=== June 28 event (Northeast) ===
List of reported tornadoes - Monday, June 28, 2010
EF#	Location	County	Coord.	Time (UTC)	Path length	Comments/Damage
New York
EF0	Herkimer	Herkimer	43.03°N 74.99°W	1938	1 mile (1.6 km)	A few houses in the village sustained minor damage.
EF0	East Palermo	Oswego	43.35°N 76.28°W	0025	1.6 miles (2.6 km)	Trees and fences were damaged.
Sources: NWS Albany, NWS Buffalo, NCDC Storm Data

=== June 28 event (South) ===
List of reported tornadoes - Monday, June 28, 2010
EF#	Location	County	Coord.	Time (UTC)	Path length	Comments/Damage
Texas
EF0	NW of Wharton	Wharton	29.37°N 96.16°W	1811	1 mile (1.6 km)	Brief tornado touchdown with no damage.
Sources: NCDC Storm Data

=== June 30 event ===
- These tornadoes were associated with Hurricane Alex.

List of reported tornadoes - Wednesday, June 30, 2010
EF#	Location	County	Coord.	Time (UTC)	Path length	Comments/Damage
Texas
EF0	E of Wadsworth	Matagorda	28.82°N 95.82°W	0705	unknown	Brief tornado caused minimal damage on pasture land.
EF0	E of Port Isabel	Cameron	26.07°N 97.21°W	1510	unknown	Tree limbs were knocked down and a fence was blown over.
EF0	W of Brownsville	Cameron	25.97°N 97.59°W	1535	0.2 miles (320 m)	Brief tornado damaged a few tree limbs, pushed over a trailer and a water kiosk.
EF0	SW of Tivoli	Refugio	28.33°N 97.02°W	1646	7 miles (11 km)	Tornado spotted by park officials at the Aransas Wildlife Refuge, remaining over open country.
EF0	N of Raymondville	Willacy	26.55°N 97.77°W	1716	1 mile (1.6 km)	Brief tornado reported by military dispatched for hurricane relief with no damage.
EF0	WNW of Robstown	Nueces	27.83°N 97.80°W	1930	100 yards (90 m)	Several trees and telephone lines were knocked down.
EF0	N of Bayside	Refugio	28.15°N 97.24°W	2010	unknown	Tornado reported by the public with no damage.
EF0	NE of Holiday Beach	Aransas	28.14°N 96.98°W	0241	0.5 miles (800 m)	Tornado reported at Goose Island State Park with tree damage.
Sources: NWS Brownsville Report: Hurricane Alex, NWS Corpus Christi

== See also ==
- Tornadoes of 2010
- List of United States tornadoes in May 2010
- List of United States tornadoes in July 2010
