= List of tornadoes in the outbreak and derecho of June 16–18, 2010 =

From June 16–18, 2010, a major tornado outbreak and derechos affected the Northern Plains, Upper Midwest and Ohio Valley.

== Confirmed tornadoes ==
Confirmed tornadoes by Enhanced Fujita rating
EFU	EF0	EF1	EF2	EF3	EF4	EF5	Total
0	48	28	9	4	4	0	93

=== June 16 event ===
List of confirmed tornadoes – Wednesday, June 16, 2010 (Note: All dates are based on the local time zone where the tornado touched down; however, all times are in Coordinated Universal Time for consistency.)
EF#	Location	County / Parish	State	Start Coord.	Time (UTC)	Path length	Max width
EF2	SE of Bowler	Carbon	MT	45.18°N 108.69°W	23:00–23:05	1 mi (1.6 km)	75 yd (69 m)
EF2	This strong tornado caused significant damage to electrical infrastructure, destroying four transmission structures, damaging another transmission pole, and shredding two wooden power poles. Some fencing was also damaged.						
EF0	S of Red Elm (1st tornado)	Ziebach	SD	44.9487°N 101.77°W	23:04–23:05	0.1 mi (0.16 km)	20 yd (18 m)
EF0	A brief tornado touched down and caused no damage.						
EF0	S of Red Elm (2nd tornado)	Ziebach	SD	45.01°N 101.77°W	23:30–23:32	0.1 mi (0.16 km)	30 yd (27 m)
EF0	This tornado briefly touched down and remained over open land.						
EF0	S of Red Elm (3rd tornado)	Ziebach	SD	45.01°N 101.77°W	23:40	0.1 mi (0.16 km)	10 yd (9.1 m)
EF0	A small needle-shaped tornado briefly occurred.						
EF0	S of Red Elm (4th tornado)	Ziebach	SD	45.01°N 101.77°W	23:41	0.1 mi (0.16 km)	10 yd (9.1 m)
EF0	No damage occurred from this narrow, brief tornado.						
EF1	ESE of Red Elm to W of Dupree	Ziebach	SD	45.0291°N 101.6809°W	00:22–00:45	2.26 mi (3.64 km)	450 yd (410 m)
EF1	A tornado touched down southwest of Dupree and moved northeast, crossing US 212 and blowing over power poles.						
EF0	W of Dupree	Ziebach	SD	45.0291°N 101.6809°W	00:30	0.1 mi (0.16 km)	10 yd (9.1 m)
EF0	A small satellite tornado to the 0022 UTC tornado caused no damage.						
EF2	Western Dupree	Ziebach	SD	45.0356°N 101.6126°W	00:33–00:49	1.38 mi (2.22 km)	450 yd (410 m)
EF2	This strong tornado touched down just south of Dupree and tracked through the west side of town, causing significant structural damage. The roof was torn off the community center, a nearby house and garage were damaged, and large grain bins were crumpled. Several mobile homes were tossed by the winds. Two people were injured..						
EF0	N of Dupree (1st tornado)	Ziebach	SD	45.0604°N 101.6086°W	00:40–00:42	0.05 mi (0.080 km)	30 yd (27 m)
EF0	This tornado remained over open land.						
EF0	N of Dupree (2nd tornado)	Ziebach	SD	45.0604°N 101.6086°W	00:40–00:42	0.05 mi (0.080 km)	30 yd (27 m)
EF0	A tornado briefly occurred.						
EF0	NNW of Dupree (1st tornado)	Ziebach	SD	45.09°N 101.64°W	00:53	0.05 mi (0.080 km)	30 yd (27 m)
EF0	The first of three tornadoes to briefly occur at the same time. No damage occurred.						
EF0	NNW of Dupree (3rd tornado)	Ziebach	SD	45.09°N 101.64°W	00:53	0.05 mi (0.080 km)	30 yd (27 m)
EF0	The second of three tornadoes to briefly occur at the same time. No damage occurred.						
EF0	NNW of Dupree (3rd tornado)	Ziebach	SD	45.09°N 101.64°W	00:53	0.05 mi (0.080 km)	30 yd (27 m)
EF0	The third of three tornadoes to briefly occur at the same time. No damage occurred.						
EF0	NNW of Dupree (4th tornado)	Ziebach	SD	45.09°N 101.64°W	00:54	0.05 mi (0.080 km)	30 yd (27 m)
EF0	A brief tornado remained over open land.						
EF0	NNW of Dupree (5th tornado)	Ziebach	SD	45.09°N 101.64°W	00:56	0.05 mi (0.080 km)	30 yd (27 m)
EF0	This tornado caused no damage over rural terrain.						
EF0	NNW of Dupree (6th tornado)	Ziebach	SD	45.09°N 101.64°W	00:58	0.05 mi (0.080 km)	30 yd (27 m)
EF0	This small tornado occurred over open land.						
EF0	NNW of Dupree (7th tornado)	Ziebach	SD	45.09°N 101.64°W	00:58	0.05 mi (0.080 km)	30 yd (27 m)
EF0	A tornado occurred over open land, causing no damage.						
EF2	NE of Lantry to NW of Eagle Butte	Dewey	SD	45.06°N 101.33°W	01:35–01:38	0.4 mi (0.64 km)	50 yd (46 m)
EF2	This brief but strong tornado struck a farmstead, inflicting severe structural damage to two homes and destroying several pole barns. Multiple pieces of agricultural equipment were damaged and a horse was mortally wounded.						
EF1	SSW of Frazer	McCone	MT	47.9946°N 106.0854°W	02:56–03:04	2.61 mi (4.20 km)	17 yd (16 m)
EF1	This tornado snapped numerous trees and damaged metal storage sheds.						

=== June 17 event ===
List of confirmed tornadoes – Thursday, June 17, 2010
EF#	Location	County / Parish	State	Start Coord.	Time (UTC)	Path length	Max width
EF1	Southern Hettinger	Adams	ND	45.9918°N 102.6418°W	16:35–16:40	0.62 mi (1.00 km)	20 yd (18 m)
EF1	This tornado formed just outside of Hettinger and crossed Mirror Lake, where it picked up water before moving into the south side of the city. As it moved through Hettinger, tree branches were broken, windows were shattered at an apartment building, and an automobile was damaged. One vehicle with two occupants was briefly lifted a few inches off the ground and dropped back down as the narrow tornado passed overhead and quickly lifted. No injuries were reported.						
EF0	W of Larson	Burke	ND	48.89°N 102.92°W	19:31–19:42	3.48 mi (5.60 km)	25 yd (23 m)
EF0	A tornado occurred over open country and caused no damage.						
EF0	NNE of Streeter to SE of Medina	Stutsman	ND	46.7971°N 99.2611°W	19:35–20:03	2.76 mi (4.44 km)	25 yd (23 m)
EF0	A tornado touched down over rural land. No damage was reported.						
EF0	SE of Twin Valley	Norman	MN	47.22°N 96.2°W	20:28–20:30	1 mi (1.6 km)	25 yd (23 m)
EF0	A weak tornado snapped several tree limbs in a cemetery.						
EF0	E of Sharon	Steele	ND	47.58°N 97.8°W	20:38–20:45	4.32 mi (6.95 km)	30 yd (27 m)
EF0	An off-duty NWS employee observed a tornado that remained over open fields and rangeland.						
EF4	SE of Urbank to NE of New York Mills	Douglas, Otter Tail	MN	46.087°N 95.437°W	20:43–21:45	39.56 mi (63.67 km)	2,288 yd (2,092 m)
EF4	1 death – See section on this tornado – 5 people were injured.						
EF0	NNE of Pingree	Stutsman	ND	47.1905°N 98.8899°W	20:44–20:47	0.4 mi (0.64 km)	25 yd (23 m)
EF0	This brief tornado remained over open country.						
EF4	NNE of Mayville to W of Thompson	Traill, Grand Forks	ND	47.54°N 97.3°W	20:49–21:18	17 mi (27 km)	150 yd (140 m)
EF4	See section on this tornado – One person was injured.						
EF0	E of Vergas	Otter Tail	MN	46.67°N 95.75°W	20:55–20:56	0.2 mi (0.32 km)	15 yd (14 m)
EF0	A brief tornado occurred near Rose Lake.						
EF0	E of Bejou to SW of Fosston	Mahnomen, Polk	MN	46.67°N 95.75°W	21:00–21:10	6 mi (9.7 km)	40 yd (37 m)
EF0	This tornado downed several trees in shelterbelts.						
EF1	NE of Sanborn to SE of Rogers	Barnes	ND	47.01°N 98.11°W	21:01–21:03	1 mi (1.6 km)	100 yd (91 m)
EF1	This tornado snapped a wooden power pole, knocked down several poplar trees, and shredded a portion of an old corn field.						
EF0	WSW of Dazey	Barnes	ND	47.17°N 98.23°W	21:05–21:05	0.2 mi (0.32 km)	15 yd (14 m)
EF0	A brief tornado occurred in an open field.						
EF0	SW of Tokio	Eddy, Benson	ND	47.83°N 98.88°W	21:27–21:28	1.2 mi (1.9 km)	15 yd (14 m)
EF0	A tornado tracked over open rangeland.						
EF2	WSW of Hope to SSE of Finley	Steele	ND	47.31°N 97.78°W	21:28–21:38	7 mi (11 km)	75 yd (69 m)
EF2	This strong tornado produced significant tree damage to shelterbelts and in fields.						
EF1	WNW of Colgate to NE of Hope	Steele	ND	47.25°N 97.67°W	21:30–21:39	7 mi (11 km)	50 yd (46 m)
EF1	This tornado tossed and twisted a center pivot irrigation system and damaged trees in shelterbelts.						
EF2	SE of Emerado to NE of Mekinock	Grand Forks	ND	47.9°N 97.3°W	21:31–21:42	7 mi (11 km)	100 yd (91 m)
EF2	A strong tornado destroyed a pole barn and several farm outbuildings. Multiple large trees were snapped or uprooted as well.						
EF1	S of Zerkel	Clearwater	MN	47.18°N 97.3°W	21:32–21:34	1 mi (1.6 km)	40 yd (37 m)
EF1	This tornado snapped large trees and downed numerous large tree limbs.						
EF2	ENE of Hope	Steele	ND	47.35°N 97.62°W	21:40–21:45	3 mi (4.8 km)	75 yd (69 m)
EF2	A strong tornado severely damaged numerous trees in shelterbelts, destroyed an abandoned farmhouse and damaged farm outbuildings.						
EF1	WNW of Zerkel to SE of Rice Lake	Clearwater	MN	47.34°N 95.49°W	21:41–21:46	3 mi (4.8 km)	30 yd (27 m)
EF1	A tornado tore some shingles, gutters and trim pieces off of a house. Numerous large tree limbs were downed and several trees were snapped or uprooted.						
EF1	NW of Grand Forks to SW of Manvel	Grand Forks	ND	47.96°N 97.21°W	21:47–22:04	10 mi (16 km)	50 yd (46 m)
EF1	This tornado collapsed a pole barn and uprooted and snapped trees.						
EF1	WSW of Hewitt	Otter Tail	MN	46.2963°N 95.23°W	21:48–21:50	1.52 mi (2.45 km)	40 yd (37 m)
EF1	See section on this tornado						
EF4	Wadena to SSE of Sebeka	Otter Tail, Wadena	MN	46.41°N 95.18°W	21:59–22:16	10 mi (16 km)	1,936 yd (1,770 m)
EF4	See article on this tornado – 20 people were injured.						
EF0	W of Hatton	Steele	ND	47.63°N 97.57°W	22:02–22:05	2.98 mi (4.80 km)	50 yd (46 m)
EF0	Several tree tops were snapped by this weak tornado.						
EF0	NW of Elmore to SSW of Blue Earth	Faribault	MN	43.5331°N 94.148°W	22:05–22:10	2.65 mi (4.26 km)	75 yd (69 m)
EF0	Storm chasers recorded a tornado which damaged a metal shed building and uprooted multiple trees.						
EF1	SSE of Goodridge	Pennington	MN	48.1°N 95.78°W	22:10–22:13	2 mi (3.2 km)	30 yd (27 m)
EF1	An intermittent tornado downed several large tree limbs, snapped some smaller trees and shifted heavy farm machinery.						
EF0	W of Lakota	Kossuth	IA	43.3737°N 94.1649°W	22:11–22:12	0.69 mi (1.11 km)	20 yd (18 m)
EF0	A brief tornado touched down and did no damage.						
EF0	N of Dahlen	Nelson	ND	48.16°N 97.97°W	22:15–22:19	3 mi (4.8 km)	25 yd (23 m)
EF0	Several large branches and tree limbs were knocked down in shelterbelts.						
EF1	W of Lake George	Hubbard	MN	47.16°N 95.15°W	22:17–22:26	6 mi (9.7 km)	80 yd (73 m)
EF1	This tornado downed numerous large trees and tree limbs.						
EF1	N of Oslo, MN	Walsh (ND), Marshall (MN)	ND, MN	48.25°N 97.16°W	22:21–22:29	5 mi (8.0 km)	50 yd (46 m)
EF1	Numerous tree were snapped or uprooted in and around the Red River of the North valley.						
EF0	S of Inkster	Grand Forks	ND	48.08°N 97.64°W	22:22–22:24	1 mi (1.6 km)	25 yd (23 m)
EF0	A few large tree limbs were broken by this tornado as it moved northward over open fields.						
EF0	NW of Winsted	McLeod	MN	44.9689°N 94.0823°W	22:23–22:26	0.78 mi (1.26 km)	25 yd (23 m)
EF0	This weak tornado broke some trees, tipped over a gravity box and did minor crop damage.						
EF0	SE of Elmore, MN	Kossuth	IA	43.457°N 94.0286°W	22:24–22:25	0.67 mi (1.08 km)	20 yd (18 m)
EF0	This tornado was observed briefly. No damage occurred.						
EF1	S of Clearbrook	Clearwater	MN	47.64°N 95.43°W	22:29–22:31	1 mi (1.6 km)	40 yd (37 m)
EF1	This tornado downed several trees onto powerlines and snapped one power pole.						
EF0	S of Nimrod to S of Oshawa	Wadena, Cass	MN	46.61°N 94.88°W	22:30–22:48	14.76 mi (23.75 km)	200 yd (180 m)
EF0	See section on this tornado						
EF0	WSW of Thompson to SW of Grand Forks	Grand Forks	ND	47.76°N 97.15°W	22:30–22:43	8 mi (13 km)	30 yd (27 m)
EF0	An intermittent weak tornado broke large tree branches in shelterbelts and near homes.						
EF1	SW of Inkster	Grand Forks	ND	48.09°N 97.69°W	22:35–22:42	4 mi (6.4 km)	75 yd (69 m)
EF1	Several large trees were snapped or uprooted.						
EF0	NNW of St. Clair to S of Eagle Lake	Blue Earth	MN	44.1002°N 93.8794°W	22:37–22:42	3.02 mi (4.86 km)	50 yd (46 m)
EF0	This weak tornado broke two dozen trees, bent a flag pole, inflicted minor damage to sheds, and blew out the windows to a house.						
EF0	NW of Gilby	Grand Forks	ND	48.09°N 97.48°W	22:37–22:40	2 mi (3.2 km)	25 yd (23 m)
EF0	A tornado remained over open fields.						
EF0	NE of Elmore to SSW of Marna	Faribault	MN	43.5275°N 94.0344°W	22:40–22:44	1.73 mi (2.78 km)	20 yd (18 m)
EF0	Storm chasers recorded this tornado as it broke dozens of trees.						
EF1	W of Fordville	Walsh	ND	48.2°N 97.85°W	22:41–22:45	2 mi (3.2 km)	50 yd (46 m)
EF1	Multiple trees were snapped or uprooted.						
EF1	N of Grygla	Marshall, Roseau	MN	48.46°N 95.62°W	22:44–22:51	4 mi (6.4 km)	40 yd (37 m)
EF1	This tornado knocked down or snapped several large trees.						
EF0	WSW of Kabekona	Hubbard	MN	47.2°N 94.91°W	22:48–22:54	4 mi (6.4 km)	30 yd (27 m)
EF0	A tornado downed several tree branches.						
EF0	SSW of Laporte	Hubbard	MN	47.15°N 94.8°W	22:49–22:51	1 mi (1.6 km)	30 yd (27 m)
EF0	Multiple tree branches were snapped by this tornado.						
EF1	NNW of Fisher to WSW of Key West	Polk	MN	47.84°N 96.82°W	22:50–23:00	7 mi (11 km)	150 yd (140 m)
EF1	An off-duty SPC employee observed a tornado that damaged farm buildings and snapped or uprooted numerous trees.						
EF0	NE of Clear Lake	Sherburne	MN	45.4874°N 93.9612°W	22:54–22:55	0.06 mi (0.097 km)	10 yd (9.1 m)
EF0	A storm chaser recorded a tornado that briefly touched down and lifted.						
EF0	NE of Clear Lake to NW of Briggs Lake	Sherburne	MN	45.4836°N 93.9543°W	22:56–23:00	2.54 mi (4.09 km)	30 yd (27 m)
EF0	A weak tornado snapped a few dozen trees.						
EF1	N of Buffalo to SW of Monticello	Wright	MN	45.201°N 93.868°W	23:00–23:08	5.13 mi (8.26 km)	50 yd (46 m)
EF1	This tornado produced isolated tree damage near its initial touchdown, with a few trees damaged early in its path. As it approached Constance Lake, the damage became more concentrated and more intense as multiple tree trunks were snapped on both sides of the lake. Farther north, the tornado weakened but continued to cause intermittent damage, including additional tree damage and the destruction of a small lean-to shelter. The tornado then dissipated shortly afterward as the damage path faded.						
EF1	E of Crookston	Polk	MN	47.78°N 96.49°W	23:00–23:04	3 mi (4.8 km)	150 yd (140 m)
EF1	A tornado caused significant farm damage by tearing a 5,000-bushel steel grain bin off its concrete pad and throwing it approximately half a mile into a nearby field. Along the remainder of its path, several trees were snapped or uprooted within a shelterbelt, and shingles were stripped from the roof of a house, indicating strong localized winds.						
EF0	SW of Bricelyn	Faribault	MN	43.5097°N 93.8644°W	23:05–23:08	0.94 mi (1.51 km)	30 yd (27 m)
EF0	This tornado moved across open fields, causing no damage.						
EF0	E of Rake	Winnebago	IA	43.4896°N 93.8661°W	23:05–23:06	1.53 mi (2.46 km)	30 yd (27 m)
EF0	A cone tornado was briefly observed over open farmland.						
EF0	SSE of Warren	Polk	MN	48.09°N 96.71°W	23:06–23:10	2 mi (3.2 km)	75 yd (69 m)
EF0	A farmstead received minor shingle damage and several large tree limbs were snapped.						
EF0	SW of Bricelyn	Faribault	MN	43.5253°N 93.8356°W	23:10–23:11	0.4 mi (0.64 km)	30 yd (27 m)
EF0	This tornado was recorded by storm chasers as it tracked through open fields, causing no damage.						
EF2	SW of Kiester	Faribault	MN	43.5129°N 93.7331°W	23:13–23:18	1.46 mi (2.35 km)	50 yd (46 m)
EF2	A strong tornado moved through rural areas before dissipating. Along its path, multiple farmsteads were heavily damaged, with several grain bins destroyed and numerous trees damaged or removed. The tornado briefly interacted with the 2316 UTC EF2 tornado, wrapping around it before weakening and lifting.						
EF3	ENE of Maple Bay to Mentor to ENE of Terrebonne	Polk, Red Lake	MN	47.64°N 96.18°W	23:15–23:36	15 mi (24 km)	150 yd (140 m)
EF3	1 death – This intense tornado began in Polk County and tracked northeast for into Red Lake County, producing significant to severe damage along its path. Numerous trees were sheared off or uprooted, and power poles were snapped as the tornado moved toward and through the community of Mentor. Roofs and garages were destroyed, and multiple farm buildings were blown down near the county line. A convenience store and gas station along US 2 were flattened. As the tornado crossed Maple Lake, it caused widespread damage to cabins, campers, boats, and docks, with debris lofted well beyond nearby communities. Additional debris was carried far northeast of Mentor before the tornado finally dissipated. Two injuries also occurred.						
EF2	Northwestern Kiester	Faribault	MN	43.5314°N 93.7229°W	23:16–23:25	2.5 mi (4.0 km)	50 yd (46 m)
EF2	This strong tornado developed just west of Kiester and moved north into the northwestern edge of the town, where it produced widespread tree damage. As it continued north, the tornado became multi-vortex and intensified, causing EF-2 damage within a grove of trees where numerous trees were heavily damaged. Farther along the path, additional trees and gravestones were knocked over in a cemetery. The tornado then turned toward the north-northeast and weakened before dissipating to the northeast of Kiester.						
EF1	ENE of Dorothy	Red Lake	MN	47.93°N 96.38°W	23:16–23:19	2 mi (3.2 km)	50 yd (46 m)
EF1	A tornado blew a parked semi tractor-trailer off a county highway, injuring the driver.						
EF0	E of Kiester	Faribault	MN	43.5365°N 93.6631°W	23:23–23:24	0.26 mi (0.42 km)	50 yd (46 m)
EF0	A brief tornado moved across open fields.						
EF1	N of Radium to W of Newfolden	Marshall	MN	48.27°N 96.64°W	23:26–23:36	7 mi (11 km)	200 yd (180 m)
EF1	This tornado produced widespread tree damage as numerous trees were snapped within shelterbelts along its path. Near Old Mill State Park, the tornado tore the roof off a small shed, scattering debris nearby. In surrounding agricultural areas, row crops exhibited ground scouring, indicating strong localized winds before the tornado dissipated.						
EF1	W of Mansfield	Faribault, Freeborn	MN	43.5692°N 93.6512°W	23:28–23:31	0.58 mi (0.93 km)	50 yd (46 m)
EF1	A brief tornado moved across open fields and groves of trees. Along its path, numerous power poles were snapped about five feet above the ground, and several dozen trees lost large branches. The tornado was photographed and captured on video by storm chasers as it progressed through the area.						
EF4	W of Mansfield to W of Hartland	Freeborn	MN	43.5755°N 93.6404°W	23:33–00:15	16.91 mi (27.21 km)	1,760 yd (1,610 m)
EF4	1 death – See article on this tornado – 14 people were injured.						
EF1	Armstrong	Freeborn	MN	43.6607°N 93.4748°W	23:55–23:59	1.07 mi (1.72 km)	100 yd (91 m)
EF1	This satellite tornado to the 2333 UTC EF4 tornado damaged several grain bins, structures and trees.						
EF3	NW of Albert Lea to S of Lemond	Freeborn, Steele	MN	43.702°N 93.4188°W	00:05–00:44	18.15 mi (29.21 km)	1,320 yd (1,210 m)
EF3	This intense tornado caused a concentrated swath of severe damage as it moved across rural areas, impacting multiple farmsteads along its path. Several homes sustained major structural damage, including one house that was completely destroyed and others that lost large portions of their roofs. Numerous outbuildings were destroyed, with debris scattered across surrounding fields. Hundreds of trees were uprooted or snapped, and some were partially debarked. As the tornado continued into Steele County and changed direction, it maintained a damaging circulation that inflicted additional heavy damage to homes and farm structures before gradually weakening and dissipating.						
EF1	E of Clarks Grove to Geneva to SW of Litomysl	Freeborn, Steele	MN	43.7634°N 93.3179°W	00:15–00:48	12.59 mi (20.26 km)	600 yd (550 m)
EF1	A tornado touched down near I-35, destroying multiple outbuildings and snapping or toppling numerous large trees as it moved northward. After leaving the area near Geneva, it continued into the Steele County, where additional outbuildings were destroyed, a barn lost its roof, and widespread tree damage persisted. The tornado gradually curved to the north-northwest before weakening and dissipating.						
EF1	NE of Albert Lea to W of Hollandale	Freeborn	MN	43.6987°N 93.2945°W	00:42–00:48	4.94 mi (7.95 km)	220 yd (200 m)
EF1	This tornado destroyed a barn, broke dozens of trees, and damaged a few sheds.						
EF3	W of Hollandale to E of Geneva	Freeborn	MN	43.7567°N 93.2367°W	00:47–00:59	5.01 mi (8.06 km)	600 yd (550 m)
EF3	This intense tornado formed west of Hollandale and quickly caused significant damage, completely obliterating a farmstead where nearly all outbuildings were destroyed and the farmhouse was leveled. As it tracked northeast, the tornado tore the roof off another house and destroyed a greenhouse. Near the end of its path, it struck an additional farmstead, damaging several outbuildings, causing minor damage to a residence, and uprooting or snapping a couple dozen trees.						
EF1	E of Geneva to SW of Blooming Prairie	Freeborn	MN	43.8103°N 93.1627°W	01:03–01:07	2.16 mi (3.48 km)	220 yd (200 m)
EF1	A tornado formed and tracked northeast through rural areas. Early in its path, it struck several farmsteads, snapping numerous trees and destroying a shed along with other outbuildings. As it continued northeast, the tornado moved primarily through open fields and groves, producing additional crop damage and breaking more trees. Damage became more sporadic toward the end of the track as the tornado weakened and eventually lifted.						
EF0	NE of Haypoint	Aitkin	MN	46.9134°N 93.5919°W	01:05–01:06	0.69 mi (1.11 km)	25 yd (23 m)
EF0	A weak tornado briefly touched down and caused minimal damage.						
EF3	WSW of Blooming Prairie to SSE of Bixby	Steele	MN	43.8588°N 93.1273°W	01:10–01:19	4.32 mi (6.95 km)	440 yd (400 m)
EF3	This intense tornado began and moved northeast, initially causing sporadic damage by breaking a few trees. As it reached a farm along MN 30 west of Blooming Prairie, damage increased, with additional tree damage and impacts to agricultural property. The tornado continued northeast, severely damaging crops, including areas where bean fields were scoured. It then intensified even further to the northwest of Blooming Prairie, where a house was completely leveled, trees were snapped with large sections of bark stripped away, and a pickup truck was lofted and deposited into the home’s basement. Nearby homes sustained lesser damage such as roof and exterior impacts. The tornado weakened and dissipated just west of US 218.						
EF2	NW of Blooming Prairie to WNW of Hayfield	Steele, Dodge	MN	43.8947°N 93.0903°W	01:25–01:40	6.61 mi (10.64 km)	100 yd (91 m)
EF2	A strong tornado touched down and tracked east-northeast, crossing the earlier damage path left by a stronger tornado from minutes before. Early in its path, a manufactured home was completely destroyed, and a woman inside was thrown roughly 20 ft (6.1 m) before being rescued alive, but injured, from the debris. As the tornado continued east-northeast, multiple outbuildings were destroyed and numerous trees were snapped or blown down. The tornado then moved into Dodge County, where it continued to cause damage across rural areas northeast of Blooming Prairie. In this area, roofs were partially torn off buildings and additional tree damage was observed before the tornado dissipated.						
EF0	N of Blooming Prairie to NE of Bixby	Steele, Dodge	MN	43.8965°N 93.0529°W	01:27–01:35	5.49 mi (8.84 km)	50 yd (46 m)
EF0	A weak tornado caused minor damage to outbuildings and several dozen trees.						
EF2	NW of Benson, WI to NW of Grantsburg, WI	Chisago (MN), Pine (MN), Burnett (WI)	MN, WI	45.7277°N 92.8743°W	01:44–02:05	7.82 mi (12.59 km)	400 yd (370 m)
EF2	This strong tornado touched down in extreme northern Chisago County, uprooting trees and snapping large branches before moving northeast into Pine County. As it intensified, the tornado caused increasingly severe damage, including widespread tree snapping and uprooting across mostly recreational land along the St. Croix River Valley. The most intense damage occurred in far southeastern Pine County, where the tornado destroyed a strapped-down mobile home, injuring two occupants. Numerous trees were snapped or uprooted where the tornado crossed Minnesota State Highway 70, and multiple nearby homes sustained significant structural damage. Continuing northeast, the tornado crossed the St. Croix River into Wisconsin, where damage became less severe but still included significant tree damage and damage to at least one home. The tornado ultimately lifted in rural area.						
EF1	Northern Rochester	Olmsted	MN	44.0649°N 92.5395°W	02:03–02:10	2.38 mi (3.83 km)	150 yd (140 m)
EF1	A tornado produced intermittent damage as it tracked through the north side of Rochester. The tornado moved through residential neighborhoods, damaging numerous homes, with at least one residence destroyed and many others sustaining roof and structural damage. The most significant non-residential impact occurred when the tornado struck a large retail store, causing extensive damage to the building. Overall, media reports indicated that at least thirty homes were damaged along the tornado’s path before it dissipated.						
EF0	NW of Grantsburg	Burnett	WI	45.806°N 92.752°W	02:05–02:06	0.31 mi (0.50 km)	200 yd (180 m)
EF0	A brief tornado occurred and caused no damage.						
EF1	N of Cream	Buffalo	WI	44.32°N 91.79°W	02:57–03:01	2.28 mi (3.67 km)	25 yd (23 m)
EF1	This tornado caused minor damage to a few buildings and snapped several large tree branches.						

=== June 18 event ===
List of confirmed tornadoes – Friday, June 18, 2010
EF#	Location	County / Parish	State	Start Coord.	Time (UTC)	Path length	Max width
EF0	N of St. Charles	Madison	IA	41.3179°N 93.8068°W	21:55–21:56	0.59 mi (0.95 km)	25 yd (23 m)
EF0	A tornado caused no damage.						
