= Key West (disambiguation) =

Key West is an island and city in the US state of Florida.

Key West may also refer to:

== Places ==
- Key West International Airport
- Key West, Iowa, an unincorporated village in Dubuque County, Iowa
- Key West, Minnesota, an unincorporated community
- Rural Municipality of Key West No. 70, a rural municipality in Saskatchewan, Canada
- Qayyarah Airfield West, air force base in Iraq
- Key West, Virginia

== Other ==
- Key West (Philosopher Pirate), a song by Bob Dylan
- Key West (TV series), a 1993 TV series created by David Beaird
- Key West (film), a 1973 TV film directed by Philip Leacock
- "Key West" (song), a 1978 song by the Village People
- USS Key West, several ships of the US Navy
