= 2010 Conger–Albert Lea tornado =

2010 EF4 tornado in Minnesota

- The tornado seen north of Albert Lea.

Meteorological history
- Formed: June 17, 2010, 6:33 p.m. CDT (UTC−05:00)
- Dissipated: June 17, 2010, 7:15 p.m. CDT (UTC−05:00)
- Duration: 42 minutes

EF4 tornado
- on the Enhanced Fujita scale
- Max width: 1,760 yards (1.00 mi; 1.61 km)
- Path length: 16.91 miles (27.21 km)
- Highest winds: 175 mph (282 km/h)

Overall effects
- Fatalities: 1
- Injuries: 14
- Damage: ~$13.5 million (2011 USD)
- Areas affected: Freeborn County, Minnesota
- Part of the June 2010 Northern Plains tornado outbreak and Tornadoes of 2010

In the evening hours of June 17, 2010, a large and powerful multi-vortex tornado moved across Freeborn County, located in the state of Minnesota. The tornado destroyed several buildings and farmsteads; one person was killed with fourteen others sustaining injuries to varying degrees. The tornado was one of four EF4-rated tornadoes to touch down on June 17, all of which occurred as part of the June 2010 Northern Plains tornado outbreak.

The tornado first touched down near Mansfield, moving in an easterly direction as it moved north of Conger. The tornado then moved through areas near Manchester, before dissipating several minutes later. The tornado was on the ground for 21 miles (34 km), and received an EF4 rating after a damage survey was conducted.

== Meteorological synopsis ==
On June 16, 2010, an upper-level area of low pressure and associated trough moved southeastward across the Rocky Mountains into the Great Plains. Along the base of the trough, the presence of a strong mid-level jet stream provided significant instability; however, warm-air aloft was expected to limit the extent of convective development. Moderate to strong deep layer wind shear along with steep lapse rates would allow for the development of supercell thunderstorms with large hail (greater than 2 in (5.1 cm) in diameter). In light of this, the Storm Prediction Center issued a slight-risk of severe weather for portions of Colorado, Montana, Nebraska, North Dakota, South Dakota and Wyoming.

The Storm Prediction Center issued a moderate risk of severe weather for June 17, 2010, citing a 10% threat for tornadoes, 45% threat for large hail and 45% threat for damaging wind, initially thinking tornadoes would quickly reform into a straight-line wind event. The moderate risk area extended from around Fargo, North Dakota, to Des Moines, Iowa, and Omaha, Nebraska, including the Twin Cities area, with a slight risk area extending across the Upper Midwest. Surface dew points reached the low 70s °F (low 20s °C) with surface temperatures well into 80s °F (near 30 °C) across Minnesota. Surface-based CAPE values were forecast to reach 2000–3000 J/kg.

The first tornadoes were reported across eastern North Dakota during the mid-afternoon hours where a tornado watch was issued for most of the state as well as extreme northwestern Minnesota closer to the Manitoba and northwestern Ontario borders where many tornadoes, some strong to violent, touched down late that afternoon. After several tornadoes affected areas near the Grand Forks area and closer to the Canada–US border, the activity eventually shifted into northwestern Minnesota by the late afternoon hours while storms over northern Iowa moved across southern Minnesota near the Interstate 90 corridor producing many tornadoes. Other storms developed over central Minnesota near Interstate 94 but most activity missed the Twin Cities area. The supercells eventually reached the Wisconsin border later that evening and reformed into a squall line, rapidly ending the severe weather outbreak. Isolated tornado reports also occurred across Wisconsin and Iowa. One of the tornadoes produced by these supercells was the Conger–Albert Lea tornado.

== Tornado summary ==
At 6:30 pm CDT, the tornado developed at the intersection of 610th Avenue and 60th Street, located near Mansfield. As the tornado moved to the northeast, it snapped power poles and trees, including a row of poles on County Road 11, which sustained EF1 damage. Swaths of trees in the area were also damaged, with some being snapped and others having heavy branch damage. Around this time, the tornado rapidly widened, reaching a width of 250 yards (230 m) as it produced EF2 damage for the first time. Rows of corn were flattened by the tornado as it continued to move to the northeast, and a home sustained roof damage. Around this time, a car was flipped and the tornado debarked several trees.

The tornado continued to move to the northeast, carving a path through Freeborn County and producing intense crop damage. As the tornado reached 500 yards (460 m), it began to damage structures at EF3 intensity, including to a farmstead that was heavily damaged. Several grain bins located nearby were also damaged, and a wind turbine was knocked over. Several more farmsteads were hit further northeast, and sustained EF3-rated damage.

The tornado continued to the northeast across County Road 4, where field raking was documented and several trees were ripped out of the ground. Near County Road 89, the tornado turned to the north, growing to 1,000 yards (910 m) and reached EF4 intensity. A farmstead located two miles north of Conger was obliterated, and several nearby structures were also heavily damaged. A car that was thrown 3,200 feet (980 m) away, and heavy tree debarking was documented. The tornado then began to weaken, striking metal buildings at EF3 intensity, while a satellite tornado formed nearby, moving through the town of Armstrong. As the main tornado crossed County Road 74, it hit a farmstead at EF2 intensity, killing a woman who was sheltering inside and another west of Albert Lea.

The tornado crossed Interstate 90, reaching EF3 intensity as it destroyed several farmsteads and damaged homes. The tornado then moved along a northward path, and the tornado destroyed more buildings as it passed west of Manchester. Heavy tree damage was documented in this area, and other structural damage was found during a post-event damage survey conducted by the National Weather Service. A mile north, the tornado weaked and damaged several grain bins at EF2 intensity near County Road 29. The tornado was 1,300 yards (1,200 m) at this point in its life, and the tornado continued to weaken past this point. A farmstead sustained EF1 damage as the tornado moved past, and the tornado dissipated several minutes later, at 7:15 pm.

== Aftermath ==
One person, Kathy Woodside, was killed by the tornado, and fourteen others were sent to nearby hospitals for their injuries. The tornado knocked power out for some time.

== See also ==
- 1992 Chandler–Lake Wilson tornado – an F5 tornado that hit Minnesota in 1992
- 2010 Wadena tornado – another EF4 tornado in Minnesota the same day

== Notes and references ==
=== Sources ===
- National Weather Service, Twin Cities (June 20, 2010). "Conger-Albert Lea tornado Damage Survey" (PDF). National Weather Service.
