= Lawrence B. Anderson =

American architect and educator

Lawrence Anderson
- Born: Lawrence Bernhart Anderson; May 7, 1906; Geneva, Minnesota, U.S.
- Died: April 6, 1994 (aged 87); Concord, Massachusetts, US
- Education: Massachusetts Institute of Technology
- Occupations: Architect; Professor
- Spouse: Rosina du Pont (m. 1936)
- Children: 3
- Awards: Paris Prize in Architecture (1930)

Lawrence Bernhart Anderson (May 7, 1906 – April 6, 1994) was an American architect and educator and an early proponent of the International Style in the US. He was the dean of the School of Architecture and Planning at the Massachusetts Institute of Technology (MIT) from 1965 to 1972.

== Early life and education ==
Lawrence Bernhart Anderson was born in Geneva, Minnesota on May 7, 1906 to parents of Danish descent. His father, a farmer, emigrated as a teenager from Denmark to the United States. His mother was a school teacher.

In 1920, his family moved to Minneapolis, where he attended University High School. There, he developed an interest in architecture from his French teacher, who was being recruited to join the faculty at an architecture school.

Anderson earned a bachelor's degree in liberal arts in 1927 and a bachelor's degree in architecture in 1928, both from the University of Minnesota. Anderson taught at the University of Virginia for two years before earning a master's degree in architecture from MIT in 1930. While a graduate student at MIT, Anderson earned the Paris Prize in Architecture for post-graduate study at the Ecole des Beaux Arts in Paris.

== Career ==
Anderson was hired by MIT in 1933 and taught in the Department of Architecture for 46 years. He served as head of the department from 1947 to 1965 and as dean of the School of Architecture and Planning from 1965 until his retirement in 1972.

In 1939, he joined Anderson & Beckwith, an architecture firm, with MIT professor Herbert Beckwith, later renamed Anderson, Beckwith, & Haible after William Haible joined. The firm designed eleven MIT campus buildings, including the MIT Radiation Laboratory, the student dormitory McCormick Hall, and the MIT Alumni Swimming Pool. The swimming pool was the first major example of International Style architecture in Cambridge. The firm also designed other buildings around the Boston metropolitan area, including the Brookline Town Hall.

Anderson was elected a Fellow of the American Academy of Arts and Sciences in 1953 and of the American Institute of Architects (AIA) in 1965. He became president of the Association of Collegiate Schools of Architecture (ACSA) from 1953 to 1955. In 1957, he was appointed as a Fulbright Lecturer to the Royal Danish Academy of Fine Arts in Copenhagen, Denmark.

Anderson won the AIA/ACSA Topaz Medallion for Excellence in Architectural Education in 1978, awarded to "an individual who has had significant impact upon architectural education and the discipline and practice of architecture".

== Personal life and death ==
In 1936, he married Rosina du Pont.

Anderson was an adviser on civic developments around the United States, such as the competition for the design of Boston City Hall in 1962. He also exhibited watercolor artwork in museums around Boston.

Anderson died from heart and kidney failure at Emerson Hospital in Concord, Massachusetts, on April 6, 1994, at the age of 87.
