= Conger, Minnesota =

City in Minnesota, United States

Conger
- City
- Location of Conger, Minnesota
- Coordinates: 43°36′55″N 93°31′39″W
- Country: United States
- State: Minnesota
- County: Freeborn

Area
  - Total: 0.13 sq mi (0.34 km^{2})
  - Land: 0.13 sq mi (0.34 km^{2})
  - Water: 0 sq mi (0.00 km^{2})
- Elevation: 1,293 ft (394 m)

Population (2020)
  - Total: 153
  - Density: 1,175.4/sq mi (453.84/km^{2})
- Time zone: UTC-6 (Central (CST))
  - Summer (DST): UTC-5 (CDT)
- ZIP code: 56020
- Area code: 507
- FIPS code: 27-12952
- GNIS feature ID: 2393619

Conger is a city in Freeborn County, Minnesota, United States. As of the 2020 census, Conger had a population of 153.

== History ==
A post office called Conger has been in operation since 1901. Conger was named by railroad officials.

== Geography ==
According to the United States Census Bureau, the city has a total area of 0.12 square miles (0.31 km^{2}), all land.

Conger is located along Freeborn County Roads 12 and 17.

== Demographics ==
Historical population
Census	Pop.	Note	%±
1940	131		—
1950	161		22.9%
1960	215		33.5%
1970	167		−22.3%
1980	183		9.6%
1990	143		−21.9%
2000	133		−7.0%
2010	146		9.8%
2020	153		4.8%
U.S. Decennial Census

=== 2010 census ===
As of the census of 2010, there were 146 people, 62 households, and 38 families living in the city. The population density was 1,216.7 inhabitants per square mile (469.8/km^{2}). There were 69 housing units at an average density of 575.0 per square mile (222.0/km^{2}). The racial makeup of the city was 97.3% White, 0.7% Asian, and 2.1% from two or more races.

There were 62 households, of which 33.9% had children under the age of 18 living with them, 50.0% were married couples living together, 6.5% had a female householder with no husband present, 4.8% had a male householder with no wife present, and 38.7% were non-families. 30.6% of all households were made up of individuals, and 14.5% had someone living alone who was 65 years of age or older. The average household size was 2.35 and the average family size was 2.92.

The median age in the city was 32.7 years. 26.7% of residents were under the age of 18; 7.6% were between the ages of 18 and 24; 34.9% were from 25 to 44; 19.2% were from 45 to 64; and 11.6% were 65 years of age or older. The gender makeup of the city was 53.4% male and 46.6% female.

=== 2000 census ===
As of the census of 2000, there were 133 people, 59 households, and 42 families living in the city. The population density was 1,133.0 inhabitants per square mile (437.5/km^{2}). There were 62 housing units at an average density of 528.2 per square mile (203.9/km^{2}). The racial makeup of the city was 99.25% White and 0.75% African American.

There were 59 households, out of which 18.6% had children under the age of 18 living with them, 62.7% were married couples living together, 6.8% had a female householder with no husband present, and 28.8% were non-families. 28.8% of all households were made up of individuals, and 11.9% had someone living alone who was 65 years of age or older. The average household size was 2.25 and the average family size was 2.76.

In the city, the population was spread out, with 17.3% under the age of 18, 7.5% from 18 to 24, 26.3% from 25 to 44, 21.1% from 45 to 64, and 27.8% who were 65 years of age or older. The median age was 45 years. For every 100 females, there were 90.0 males. For every 100 females age 18 and over, there were 89.7 males.

The median income for a household in the city was $32,500, and the median income for a family was $41,250. Males had a median income of $26,875 versus $18,125 for females. The per capita income for the city was $17,944. There were 3.8% of families and 4.1% of the population living below the poverty line, including no under eighteens and 10.3% of those over 64.

== See also ==
- 2010 Conger–Albert Lea tornado
