= Nevada, Illinois =

- Unincorporated community
- Location within Illinois Location within the United States
- Coordinates: 41°05′09″N 88°33′05″W
- Country: United States
- State: Illinois
- County: Livingston
- Township: Nevada
- Elevation: 679 ft (207 m)
- Time zone: UTC-6 (Central (CST))
  - Summer (DST): UTC-5 (CDT)
- Area codes: 815 & 779
- GNIS feature ID: 423015

Nevada is an unincorporated community in Livingston County, in the U.S. state of Illinois.

== History ==
A post office called Nevada was established in 1870, and remained in operation until 1921. The community was named after the state of Nevada.
