= USS Key West =

USS Key West has been the name of three ships in the United States Navy.

- USS Key West (1862), was a steamship used by the Union Navy during the American Civil War
- USS Key West (PF-17), was a Tacoma-class frigate launched in 1943 and scrapped in 1947
- USS Key West (SSN-722), is a Los Angeles-class submarine currently in service

== See also ==
- USS Key (DE-348), a John C. Butler-class destroyer escort launched in 1943 and broken up in 1972
