= Manchester, Minnesota =

City in Minnesota, United States

Manchester
- City
- Location of Manchester, Minnesota
- Coordinates: 43°43′32″N 93°27′03″W
- Country: United States
- State: Minnesota
- County: Freeborn

Area
  - Total: 0.073 sq mi (0.19 km^{2})
  - Land: 0.073 sq mi (0.19 km^{2})
  - Water: 0 sq mi (0.00 km^{2})
- Elevation: 1,283 ft (391 m)

Population (2020)
  - Total: 52
  - Density: 698.7/sq mi (269.78/km^{2})
- Time zone: UTC-6 (Central (CST))
  - Summer (DST): UTC-5 (CDT)
- ZIP code: 56007
- Area code: 507
- FIPS code: 27-39716
- GNIS feature ID: 2395825
- Website: manchestermn.gov

Manchester is a city in Freeborn County, Minnesota, United States. As of the 2020 census, Manchester had a population of 52.

== History ==
Manchester was laid out in 1878, and named after Manchester Township, Illinois, the former home of an early settler. Manchester was platted in 1882. A post office was established at Manchester in 1878, and remained in operation until it was discontinued in 1974.

== Geography ==
According to the United States Census Bureau, the city has a total area of 0.09 square miles (0.23 km^{2}), all land.

Minnesota State Highway 13 serves as a main route in the community, and Interstate 90 is nearby.

== Demographics ==
Historical population
Census	Pop.	Note	%±
1950	113		—
1960	131		15.9%
1970	89		−32.1%
1980	96		7.9%
1990	69		−28.1%
2000	81		17.4%
2010	57		−29.6%
2020	52		−8.8%
U.S. Decennial Census

=== 2010 census ===
As of the census of 2010, there were 57 people, 26 households, and 15 families living in the city. The population density was 633.3 inhabitants per square mile (244.5/km^{2}). There were 30 housing units at an average density of 333.3 per square mile (128.7/km^{2}). The racial makeup of the city was 100.0% White. Hispanic or Latino of any race were 1.8% of the population.

There were 26 households, of which 23.1% had children under the age of 18 living with them, 50.0% were married couples living together, 3.8% had a female householder with no husband present, 3.8% had a male householder with no wife present, and 42.3% were non-families. 38.5% of all households were made up of individuals, and 15.3% had someone living alone who was 65 years of age or older. The average household size was 2.19 and the average family size was 3.00.

The median age in the city was 36.8 years. 26.3% of residents were under the age of 18; 7.1% were between the ages of 18 and 24; 24.6% were from 25 to 44; 22.9% were from 45 to 64; and 19.3% were 65 years of age or older. The gender makeup of the city was 59.6% male and 40.4% female.

=== 2000 census ===
As of the census of 2000, there were 81 people, 32 households, and 23 families living in the city. The population density was 910.2 inhabitants per square mile (351.4/km^{2}). There were 33 housing units at an average density of 370.8 per square mile (143.2/km^{2}). The racial makeup of the city was 100.00% White.

There were 32 households, out of which 28.1% had children under the age of 18 living with them, 43.8% were married couples living together, 15.6% had a female householder with no husband present, and 28.1% were non-families. 18.8% of all households were made up of individuals, and 6.3% had someone living alone who was 65 years of age or older. The average household size was 2.53 and the average family size was 2.96.

In the city, the population was spread out, with 23.5% under the age of 18, 11.1% from 18 to 24, 23.5% from 25 to 44, 24.7% from 45 to 64, and 17.3% who were 65 years of age or older. The median age was 36 years. For every 100 females, there were 97.6 males. For every 100 females age 18 and over, there were 100.0 males.

The median income for a household in the city was $26,786, and the median income for a family was $49,375. Males had a median income of $35,833 versus $19,375 for females. The per capita income for the city was $15,392. There were 15.8% of families and 15.6% of the population living below the poverty line, including 19.2% of under eighteens and none of those over 64.
