= Rapidan, Minnesota =

Unincorporated community in Minnesota, US

Rapidan
- Unincorporated community
- Location within Minnesota Location within the United States
- Coordinates: 44°05′40″N 94°04′07″W
- Country: United States
- State: Minnesota
- County: Blue Earth
- Elevation: 988 ft (301 m)
- Time zone: UTC-6 (Central (CST))
  - Summer (DST): UTC-5 (CDT)
- Area code: 507
- GNIS feature ID: 649825

Rapidan is an unincorporated community in Rapidan Township, Blue Earth County, Minnesota, United States.
