= Radium, Minnesota =

- Incorporated community
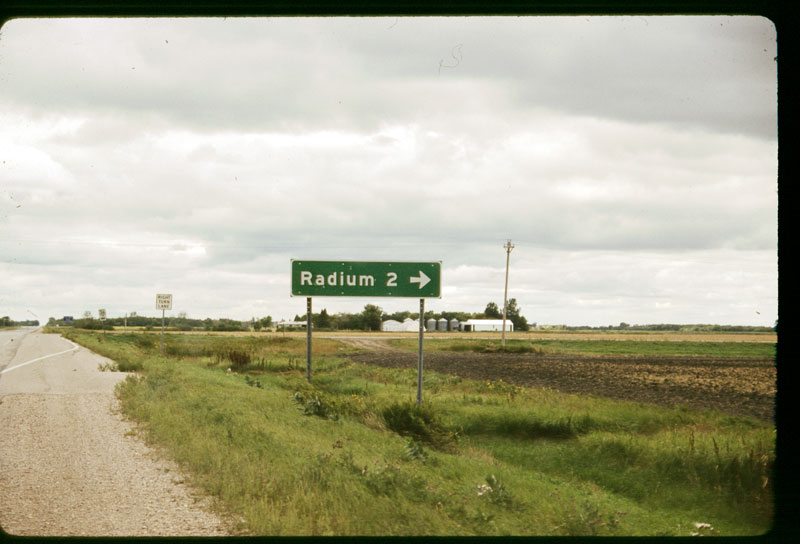
- Road sign

- Location within Minnesota Location within the United States
- Coordinates: 48°13′46″N 96°36′49″W
- Country: United States
- State: Minnesota
- County: Marshall
- Township: Comstock
- Elevation: 925 ft (282 m)

Population
  - Total: 32
- Time zone: UTC-6 (Central (CST))
  - Summer (DST): UTC-5 (CDT)
- Area code: 218
- GNIS feature ID: 649789

Radium is an incorporated community in section 19 of Comstock Township, Marshall County, Minnesota, United States. It was built alongside the Minneapolis, St. Paul and Sault Ste. Marie Railroad (Soo Line Railroad) branch line built in 1905 from Thief River Falls, Minnesota, to Kenmare, North Dakota. (This line still operates under the aegis of the Northern Plains Railroad.) The place was named for the element radium. Radium had its own post office from 1905 to 1984. Since 1984, Radium has been served by the post office in Warren. It is also on the Warren telephone exchange and part of the Warren-Alvarado-Oslo school district. The townsite is being slowly reclaimed for use as farmland. There is still a large grain elevator on the railroad line south of the townsite. A small Lutheran church 1 1/2 miles (2.4 km) south of the town antedates the coming of the railroad; Immanuel Lutheran Church (LCMS) was organized in 1897.

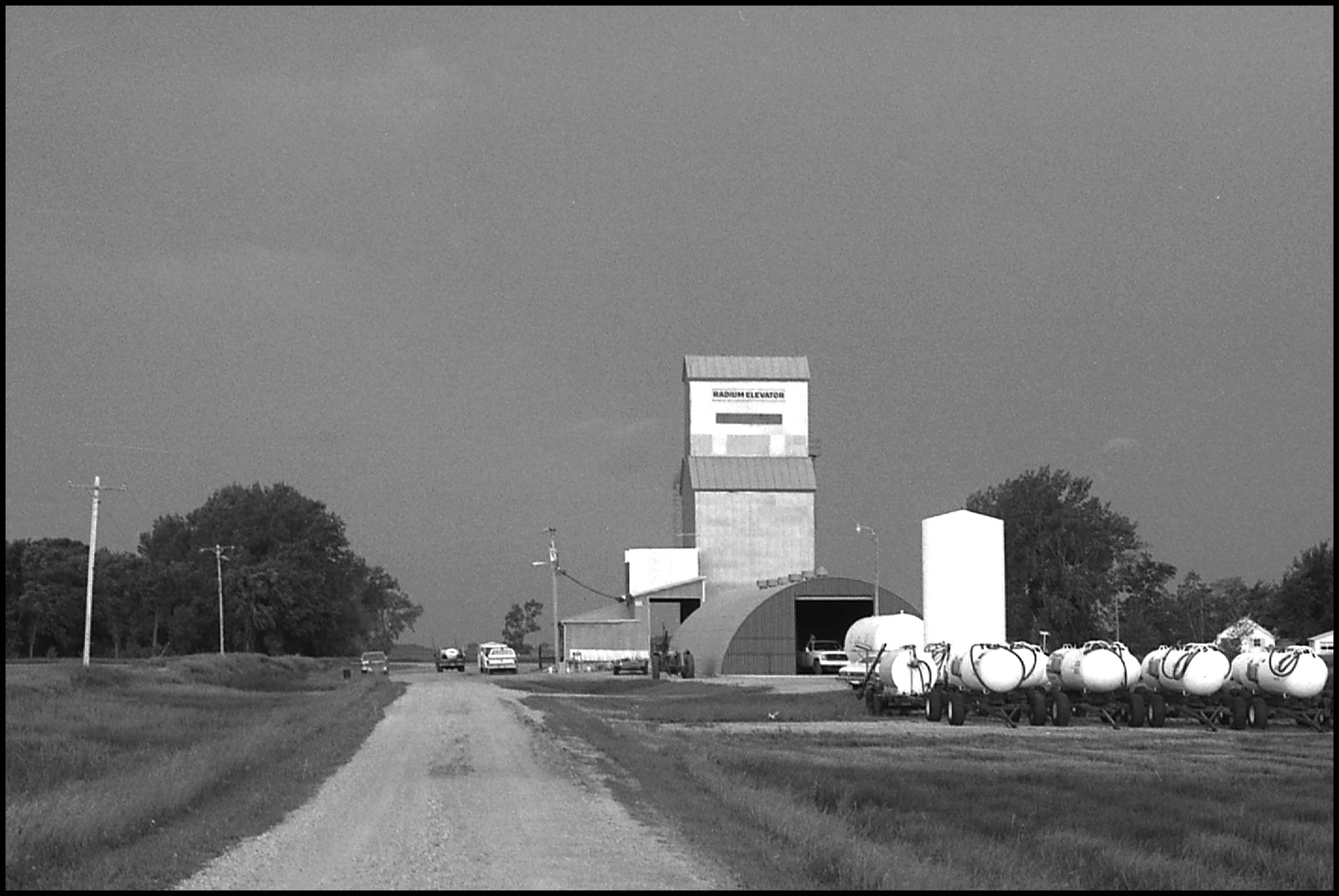
Radium Township, circa 1983
