= Geneva, Minnesota =

City in Minnesota, United States

Geneva
- City
- Location of Geneva, Minnesota
- Coordinates: 43°49′22″N 93°16′06″W
- Country: United States
- State: Minnesota
- County: Freeborn

Area
  - Total: 0.47 sq mi (1.23 km^{2})
  - Land: 0.47 sq mi (1.21 km^{2})
  - Water: 0.0039 sq mi (0.01 km^{2})
- Elevation: 1,227 ft (374 m)

Population (2020)
  - Total: 508
  - Density: 1,086.5/sq mi (419.49/km^{2})
- Time zone: UTC-6 (Central (CST))
  - Summer (DST): UTC-5 (CDT)
- ZIP code: 56035
- Area code: 507
- FIPS code: 27-23354
- GNIS feature ID: 2394876
- Website: https://cityofgenevamn.com/

Geneva is a city in Freeborn County, Minnesota, United States. As of the 2020 census, Geneva had a population of 508.

== History ==
A post office has been in operation at Geneva since 1855. Geneva was platted in 1857. The city was named after Geneva, New York. It was the birthplace of Lawrence B. Anderson (1906-1994), noted architect and educator who lead the architecture school at Massachusetts Institute of Technology.

== Geography ==
According to the United States Census Bureau, the city has a total area of 0.53 square miles (1.37 km^{2}), of which 0.52 square miles (1.35 km^{2}) is land and 0.01 square miles (0.03 km^{2}) is water.

Geneva is along Interstate 35, and Freeborn County Roads 35 and 45.

== Demographics ==
Historical population
Census	Pop.	Note	%±
1900	218		—
1910	140		−35.8%
1920	207		47.9%
1930	245		18.4%
1940	313		27.8%
1950	332		6.1%
1960	347		4.5%
1970	358		3.2%
1980	417		16.5%
1990	444		6.5%
2000	449		1.1%
2010	555		23.6%
2020	508		−8.5%
U.S. Decennial Census

=== 2010 census ===
As of the census of 2010, there were 555 people, 220 households, and 152 families living in the city. The population density was 1,067.3 inhabitants per square mile (412.1/km^{2}). There were 228 housing units at an average density of 438.5 per square mile (169.3/km^{2}). The racial makeup of the city was 98.6% White, 0.2% Asian, 0.2% from other races, and 1.1% from two or more races. Hispanic or Latino of any race were 1.1% of the population.

There were 220 households, of which 35.9% had children under the age of 18 living with them, 57.7% were married couples living together, 5.0% had a female householder with no husband present, 6.4% had a male householder with no wife present, and 30.9% were non-families. 25.5% of all households were made up of individuals, and 10.9% had someone living alone who was 65 years of age or older. The average household size was 2.52 and the average family size was 3.06.

The median age in the city was 38.3 years. 27.2% of residents were under the age of 18; 6.5% were between the ages of 18 and 24; 26.3% were from 25 to 44; 26.3% were from 45 to 64; and 13.7% were 65 years of age or older. The gender makeup of the city was 49.5% male and 50.5% female.

=== 2000 census ===
As of the census of 2000, there were 449 people, households, and families living in the city. The population density was 1,097.3 inhabitants per square mile (423.7/km^{2}). There were 186 housing units at an average density of 454.5 per square mile (175.5/km^{2}). The racial makeup of the city was 99.55% White, 0.22% Native American and 0.22% Asian. Hispanic or Latino of any race were 0.45% of the population.

There were 184 households, out of which 29.3% had children under the age of 18 living with them, 62.0% were married couples living together, 4.9% had a female householder with no husband present, and 31.5% were non-families. 28.3% of all households were made up of individuals, and 14.7% had someone living alone who was 65 years of age or older. The average household size was 2.40 and the average family size was 2.95.

In the city, the population was spread out, with 25.4% under the age of 18, 8.0% from 18 to 24, 27.4% from 25 to 44, 22.9% from 45 to 64, and 16.3% who were 65 years of age or older. The median age was 38 years. For every 100 females, there were 96.1 males. For every 100 females age 18 and over, there were 105.5 males.

The median income for a household in the city was $39,375, and the median income for a family was $50,893. Males had a median income of $32,000 versus $25,375 for females. The per capita income for the city was $17,129. About 2.3% of families and 5.2% of the population were below the poverty line, including 3.5% of those under age 18 and 10.0% of those age 65 or over.
