= Hartland, Minnesota =

City in Minnesota, United States

Hartland
- City
- Location of Hartland, Minnesota
- Coordinates: 43°48′15″N 93°29′04″W
- Country: United States
- State: Minnesota
- County: Freeborn

Area
  - Total: 0.27 sq mi (0.70 km^{2})
  - Land: 0.27 sq mi (0.70 km^{2})
  - Water: 0 sq mi (0.00 km^{2})
- Elevation: 1,253 ft (382 m)

Population (2020)
  - Total: 321
  - Density: 1,188.1/sq mi (458.72/km^{2})
- Time zone: UTC-6 (Central (CST))
  - Summer (DST): UTC-5 (CDT)
- ZIP code: 56042
- Area code: 507
- FIPS code: 27-27404
- GNIS feature ID: 2394311
- Website: https://www.hartlandmn.com/

Hartland is a city in Freeborn County, Minnesota, United States. As of the 2020 census, Hartland had a population of 321.

== History ==
Hartland was platted in 1877. The name is derived from Hartland, Vermont.

On December 15, 2021, parts of Hartland sustained significant damage after the town was struck by an EF2 tornado. The tornado was one of over 100 to occur during the December 2021 Midwest derecho and tornado outbreak.

== Geography ==
According to the United States Census Bureau, the city has a total area of 0.30 square miles (0.78 km^{2}), all land.

Minnesota State Highway 13 serves as a main route in the community.

== Demographics ==
Historical population
Census	Pop.	Note	%±
1880	107		—
1900	317		—
1910	227		−28.4%
1920	229		0.9%
1930	228		−0.4%
1940	224		−1.8%
1950	300		33.9%
1960	330		10.0%
1970	331		0.3%
1980	322		−2.7%
1990	270		−16.1%
2000	288		6.7%
2010	315		9.4%
2020	321		1.9%
U.S. Decennial Census

=== 2010 census ===
As of the census of 2010, there were 315 people, 140 households, and 78 families living in the city. The population density was 1,050.0 inhabitants per square mile (405.4/km^{2}). There were 148 housing units at an average density of 493.3 per square mile (190.5/km^{2}). The racial makeup of the city was 97.8% White, 1.0% from other races, and 1.3% from two or more races. Hispanic or Latino of any race were 2.2% of the population.

There were 140 households, of which 26.4% had children under the age of 18 living with them, 43.6% were married couples living together, 6.4% had a female householder with no husband present, 5.7% had a male householder with no wife present, and 44.3% were non-families. Of all households 35.0% were made up of individuals, and 12.2% had someone living alone who was 65 years of age or older. The average household size was 2.25 and the average family size was 2.91.

The median age in the city was 36.8 years. 23.8% of residents were under the age of 18; 7.9% were between the ages of 18 and 24; 25.7% were from 25 to 44; 22.8% were from 45 to 64; and 19.7% were 65 years of age or older. The gender makeup of the city was 49.2% male and 50.8% female.

=== 2000 census ===
As of the census of 2000, there were 288 people, 134 households, and 84 families living in the city. The population density was 1,052.0 inhabitants per square mile (406.2/km^{2}). There were 144 housing units at an average density of 526.0 per square mile (203.1/km^{2}). The racial makeup of the city was 98.61% White, 1.39% from other races. Hispanic or Latino of any race were 1.39% of the population.

There were 134 households, out of which 23.1% had children under the age of 18 living with them, 52.2% were married couples living together, 6.0% had a female householder with no husband present, and 37.3% were non-families. Of all households 32.8% were made up of individuals, and 13.4% had someone living alone who was 65 years of age or older. The average household size was 2.15 and the average family size was 2.74.

In the city, the population was spread out, with 20.5% under the age of 18, 7.6% from 18 to 24, 31.3% from 25 to 44, 21.9% from 45 to 64, and 18.8% who were 65 years of age or older. The median age was 39 years. For every 100 females, there were 108.7 males. For every 100 females age 18 and over, there were 108.2 males.

The median income for a household in the city was $37,500, and the median income for a family was $46,250. Males had a median income of $29,792 versus $26,458 for females. The per capita income for the city was $22,429. About 5.1% of families and 3.8% of the population were below the poverty line, including none of those under the age of eighteen or sixty five or over.

== Notable person ==
- American model and actress Audra Lynn, Miss October 2003 in Playboy magazine.
