= Bowler, Montana =

Unincorporated community in Montana, US

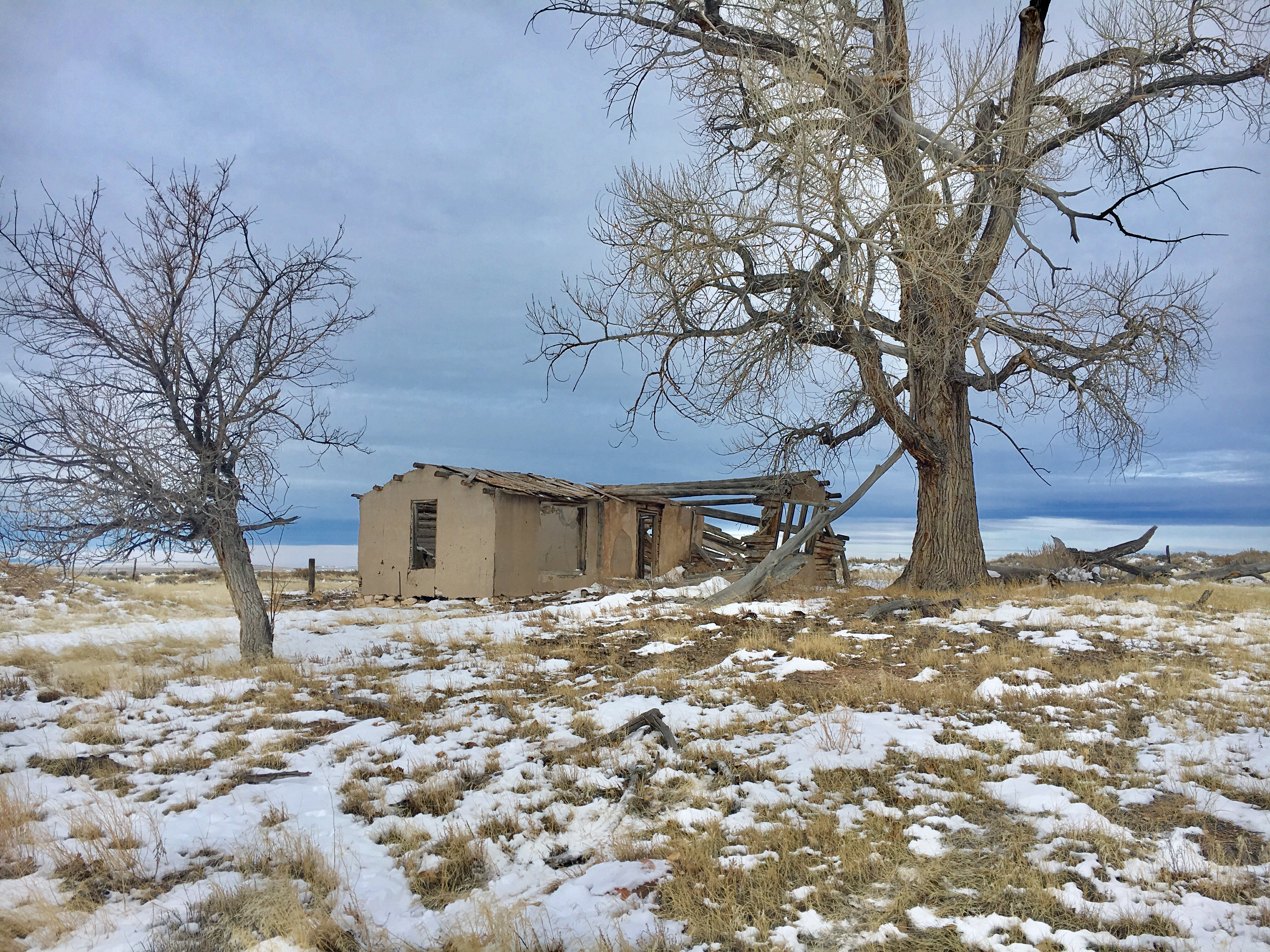
Remains of an old stage coach stop near Bowler, MT.

Bowler is an unincorporated community located in Carbon County, Montana, United States at 45°12′18″N 108°43′08″W.

The elevation is 4,698 feet. Bowler appears on the Bowler U.S. Geological Survey Map.

== History ==
Bowler was an isolated agricultural community established in the late 1890s, situated in a valley at the foot of the Pryor Mountains. A post office operated in Bowler from 1894 to 1936, there was also a bar and a cemetery situated just outside town. A few buildings and foundations located away from Pryor Mountain Road are all that remains today.
