= Marna, Minnesota =

Unincorporated community in Minnesota, United States

Marna
- Unincorporated community
- Location within Minnesota Location within the United States
- Coordinates: 43°36′21″N 94°00′28″W
- Country: United States
- State: Minnesota
- County: Faribault
- Elevation: 1,109 ft (338 m)
- Time zone: UTC-6 (Central (CST))
  - Summer (DST): UTC-5 (CDT)
- Area code: 507
- GNIS feature ID: 654820

Marna is an unincorporated community in Faribault County, in the U.S. state of Minnesota.

== History ==
Marna contained a post office from 1901 until 1911. The community was named after the Marne River, in France.
