= Red Elm, South Dakota =

Unincorporated community in South Dakota, U.S.

Coordinates: 45°03′19″N 101°47′03″W

Red Elm is an unincorporated community in Ziebach County, in the U.S. state of South Dakota.

== History ==
Red Elm had its start in 1910 when the railroad was extended to that point. The community was named for red elm trees near the original town site. A post office called Red Elm was established in 1911, and remained in operation until 1960.
