= Elmore, Minnesota =

City in Minnesota, United States

Elmore
- City
- Location of Elmore, Minnesota
- Coordinates: 43°30′23″N 94°05′18″W
- Country: United States
- State: Minnesota
- County: Faribault

Government
  - Type: Mayor - Council
  - Mayor: Bjorn Olson

Area
  - Total: 0.85 sq mi (2.19 km^{2})
  - Land: 0.85 sq mi (2.19 km^{2})
  - Water: 0 sq mi (0.00 km^{2})
- Elevation: 1,125 ft (343 m)

Population (2020)
  - Total: 549
  - Density: 649/sq mi (250.5/km^{2})
- Time zone: UTC-6 (Central (CST))
  - Summer (DST): UTC-5 (CDT)
- ZIP code: 56027
- Area code: 507
- FIPS code: 27-18998
- GNIS feature ID: 2394675
- Website: https://www.elmoremn.com/

Elmore is a city in Faribault County, Minnesota, United States. As of the 2020 census, Elmore had a population of 549. Elmore was the boyhood home of former U.S. Vice President and Democratic presidential candidate Walter F. Mondale.

== History ==
A post office called Elmore has been in operation since 1863. The city was named for Andrew E. Elmore, an early settler.

== Geography ==
According to the United States Census Bureau, the city has a total area of 0.92 square miles (2.38 km^{2}), all land. Elmore borders the state of Iowa to its south.

U.S. Highway 169 serves as a main route in the community.

== Demographics ==
Historical population
Census	Pop.	Note	%±
1890	488		—
1900	924		89.3%
1910	795		−14.0%
1920	904		13.7%
1930	744		−17.7%
1940	935		25.7%
1950	1,074		14.9%
1960	1,078		0.4%
1970	910		−15.6%
1980	882		−3.1%
1990	709		−19.6%
2000	735		3.7%
2010	663		−9.8%
2020	549		−17.2%
U.S. Decennial Census

=== 2010 census ===
As of the census of 2010, there were 663 people, 266 households, and 158 families living in the city. The population density was 720.7 inhabitants per square mile (278.3/km^{2}). There were 320 housing units at an average density of 347.8 per square mile (134.3/km^{2}). The racial makeup of the city was 92.2% White, 2.7% African American, 1.7% Native American, 0.2% Asian, 1.7% from other races, and 1.7% from two or more races. Hispanic or Latino of any race were 13.1% of the population.

There were 266 households, of which 24.8% had children under the age of 18 living with them, 41.7% were married couples living together, 12.0% had a female householder with no husband present, 5.6% had a male householder with no wife present, and 40.6% were non-families. 36.1% of all households were made up of individuals, and 15.1% had someone living alone who was 65 years of age or older. The average household size was 2.23 and the average family size was 2.82.

The median age in the city was 38.6 years. 29.3% of residents were under the age of 18; 7.4% were between the ages of 18 and 24; 18.1% were from 25 to 44; 26.7% were from 45 to 64; and 18.4% were 65 years of age or older. The gender makeup of the city was 49.5% male and 50.5% female.

=== 2000 census ===
As of the census of 2000, there were 735 people, 305 households, and 185 families living in the city. The population density was 815.9 inhabitants per square mile (315.0/km^{2}). There were 338 housing units at an average density of 375.2 per square mile (144.9/km^{2}). The racial makeup of the city was 92.11% White, 1.77% African American, 1.22% Native American, 1.22% Asian, 2.31% from other races, and 1.36% from two or more races. Hispanic or Latino of any race formed 4.76% of the population.

There were 305 households, of which 21.6% had children under the age of 18 living with them, 48.5% were married couples living together, 8.2% had a female householder with no husband present, and 39.3% were non-families. 36.1% of all households were made up of individuals, and 19.7% had someone living alone who was 65 years of age or older. The average household size was 2.13 and the average family size was 2.73.

In the city, the population was spread out, with 28.7% under the age of 18, 7.6% from 18 to 24, 18.2% from 25 to 44, 23.1% from 45 to 64, and 22.3% who were 65 years of age or older. The median age was 42 years. For every 100 females, there were 109.4 males. For every 100 females age 18 and over, there were 88.5 males.

The median income for a household in the city was $26,146, and the median income for a family was $34,583. Males had a median income of $23,906 versus $19,375 for females. The per capita income for the city was $15,761. About 8.1% of families and 11.8% of the population were below the poverty line, including 15.0% of those under age 18 and 14.7% of those age 65 or over.
