= Armstrong, Minnesota =

Unincorporated community in Minnesota, United States

Armstrong
- Unincorporated community
- Location within Minnesota Location within the United States
- Coordinates: 43°39′53″N 93°28′05″W
- Country: United States
- State: Minnesota
- County: Freeborn
- Elevation: 1,280 ft (390 m)
- Time zone: UTC-6 (Central (CST))
  - Summer (DST): UTC-5 (CDT)
- Area code: 507
- GNIS feature ID: 639442

Armstrong is an unincorporated community in Freeborn County, in the U.S. state of Minnesota.

== History ==
Armstrong was laid out in 1878, and named for Thomas H. Armstrong, a Minnesota politician who had the local grain elevator built. A post office was established at Armstrong in 1878, and remained in operation until it was discontinued in 1957.
