= Key West, Minnesota =

Key West
- Unincorporated community
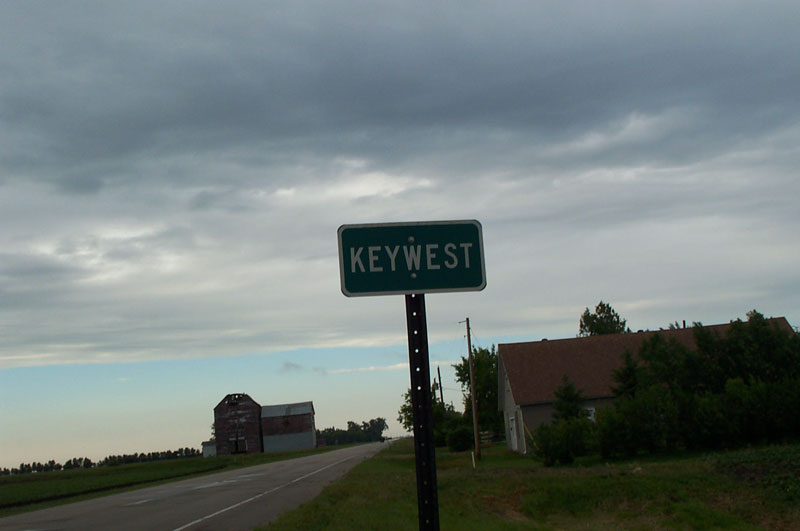

- Location within Minnesota Location within the United States
- Coordinates: 47°56′05″N 96°47′00″W
- Country: United States
- State: Minnesota
- County: Polk
- Elevation: 856 ft (261 m)
- Time zone: UTC-6 (Central (CST))
  - Summer (DST): UTC-5 (CDT)
- Area code: 218
- GNIS feature ID: 654777

Key West is an unincorporated community in Polk County, in the U.S. state of Minnesota.

== History ==
An old variant name was Bockersville. The present name of Key West may be derived from nearby Keystone Township, according to local history. A post office was established under the name Bockersville in 1892, the name was changed to Keywest in 1896, and the post office was discontinued in 1910.
