= Mansfield, Minnesota =

Unincorporated community in Minnesota, United States

Mansfield
- Unincorporated community
- Location within Minnesota Location within the United States
- Coordinates: 43°34′21″N 93°36′32″W
- Country: United States
- State: Minnesota
- County: Freeborn
- Elevation: 1,247 ft (380 m)
- Time zone: UTC-6 (Central (CST))
  - Summer (DST): UTC-5 (CDT)
- Area code: 507
- GNIS feature ID: 647450

Mansfield is an unincorporated community in Mansfield Township, Freeborn County, Minnesota, United States.
