= West Union =

West Union may refer to several places in the United States:

- West Union, Illinois
- West Union, Indiana, Parke County
- West Union (Busro), Indiana, an abandoned Shaker community in Knox County
- West Union, Iowa
- West Union, Minnesota
- West Union, Missouri, an extinct hamlet in Cass County, Missouri
- West Union, Holt County, Missouri, an extinct hamlet; see Dallas, Missouri
- West Union, New York
- West Union, Ohio
- West Union, Oregon
- West Union, South Carolina
- West Union, West Virginia, Doddridge County
- West Union, Pocahontas County, West Virginia
- Dallas, West Virginia, Marshall County, also known as West Union
- West Union Creek, a stream in San Mateo County, California

== See also ==
- West Union Township (disambiguation)
