= Union Township =

Union Township may refer to:

== Arkansas ==
- Union Township, Ashley County, Arkansas
- Union Township, Baxter County, Arkansas
- Union Township, Conway County, Arkansas
- Union Township, Faulkner County, Arkansas
- Union Township, Fulton County, Arkansas
- Union Township, Greene County, Arkansas
- Union Township, Independence County, Arkansas
- Union Township, Izard County, Arkansas
- Union Township, Jackson County, Arkansas
- Union Township, Lee County, Arkansas
- Union Township, Marion County, Arkansas
- Union Township, Nevada County, Arkansas
- Union Township, Ouachita County, Arkansas
- Union Township, Perry County, Arkansas
- Union Township, Prairie County, Arkansas
- Union Township, Randolph County, Arkansas
- Union Township, Saline County, Arkansas
- Union Township, Stone County, Arkansas
- Union Township, Van Buren County, Arkansas
- Union Township, White County, Arkansas

== Illinois ==
- Union Township, Cumberland County, Illinois
- Union Township, Effingham County, Illinois
- Union Township, Fulton County, Illinois
- Union Township, Livingston County, Illinois

== Indiana ==
- Union Township, Adams County, Indiana
- Union Township, Benton County, Indiana
- Union Township, Boone County, Indiana
- Union Township, Clark County, Indiana
- Union Township, Clinton County, Indiana
- Union Township, Crawford County, Indiana
- Union Township, DeKalb County, Indiana
- Union Township, Delaware County, Indiana
- Union Township, Elkhart County, Indiana
- Union Township, Fulton County, Indiana
- Union Township, Gibson County, Indiana
- Union Township, Hendricks County, Indiana
- Union Township, Howard County, Indiana
- Union Township, Huntington County, Indiana
- Union Township, Jasper County, Indiana
- Union Township, Johnson County, Indiana
- Union Township, LaPorte County, Indiana
- Union Township, Madison County, Indiana
- Union Township, Marshall County, Indiana
- Union Township, Miami County, Indiana
- Union Township, Montgomery County, Indiana
- Union Township, Ohio County, Indiana
- Union Township, Parke County, Indiana
- Union Township, Perry County, Indiana
- Union Township, Porter County, Indiana
- Union Township, Randolph County, Indiana
- Union Township, Rush County, Indiana
- Union Township, St. Joseph County, Indiana
- Union Township, Shelby County, Indiana
- Union Township, Tippecanoe County, Indiana
- Union Township, Union County, Indiana
- Union Township, Vanderburgh County, Indiana
- Union Township, Wells County, Indiana
- Union Township, White County, Indiana
- Union Township, Whitley County, Indiana

== Iowa ==
- Union Township, Adair County, Iowa
- Union Township, Adams County, Iowa
- Union Township, Appanoose County, Iowa
- Union Township, Benton County, Iowa
- Union Township, Black Hawk County, Iowa
- Union Township, Boone County, Iowa
- Union Township, Calhoun County, Iowa
- Union Township, Carroll County, Iowa
- Union Township, Cass County, Iowa
- Union Township, Cerro Gordo County, Iowa
- Union Township, Crawford County, Iowa
- Union Township, Dallas County, Iowa
- Union Township, Davis County, Iowa
- Union Township, Delaware County, Iowa
- Union Township, Des Moines County, Iowa
- Union Township, Fayette County, Iowa
- Union Township, Floyd County, Iowa
- Union Township, Guthrie County, Iowa
- Union Township, Hardin County, Iowa
- Union Township, Harrison County, Iowa
- Union Township, Jackson County, Iowa
- Union Township, Johnson County, Iowa
- Union Township, Kossuth County, Iowa
- Union Township, Louisa County, Iowa
- Union Township, Lucas County, Iowa
- Union Township, Madison County, Iowa
- Union Township, Mahaska County, Iowa
- Union Township, Marion County, Iowa, in Marion County, Iowa
- Union Township, Mitchell County, Iowa
- Union Township, Monroe County, Iowa
- Union Township, O'Brien County, Iowa
- Union Township, Plymouth County, Iowa
- Union Township, Polk County, Iowa
- Union Township, Poweshiek County, Iowa
- Union Township, Ringgold County, Iowa
- Union Township, Shelby County, Iowa
- Union Township, Story County, Iowa
- Union Township, Union County, Iowa, in Union County, Iowa
- Union Township, Van Buren County, Iowa
- Union Township, Warren County, Iowa, in Warren County, Iowa
- Union Township, Wayne County, Iowa, in Wayne County, Iowa
- Union Township, Woodbury County, Iowa
- Union Township, Worth County, Iowa

== Kansas ==
- Union Township, Barton County, Kansas
- Union Township, Butler County, Kansas
- Union Township, Clay County, Kansas
- Union Township, Dickinson County, Kansas
- Union Township, Doniphan County, Kansas
- Union Township, Jefferson County, Kansas
- Union Township, Kingman County, Kansas
- Union Township, McPherson County, Kansas
- Union Township, Pottawatomie County, Kansas, in Pottawatomie County, Kansas
- Union Township, Rawlins County, Kansas, in Rawlins County, Kansas
- Union Township, Republic County, Kansas
- Union Township, Rice County, Kansas
- Union Township, Rush County, Kansas, in Rush County, Kansas
- Union Township, Sedgwick County, Kansas
- Union Township, Sheridan County, Kansas
- Union Township, Sherman County, Kansas
- Union Township, Stafford County, Kansas, in Stafford County, Kansas
- Union Township, Washington County, Kansas, in Washington County, Kansas

== Michigan ==
- Union Charter Township, Michigan
- Union Township, Branch County, Michigan
- Union Township, Grand Traverse County, Michigan

== Minnesota ==
- Union Township, Houston County, Minnesota

== Missouri ==
- Union Township, Barton County, Missouri
- Union Township, Benton County, Missouri
- Union Township, Bollinger County, Missouri
- Union Township, Cass County, Missouri
- Union Township, Clark County, Missouri
- Union Township, Crawford County, Missouri
- Union Township, Daviess County, Missouri
- Union Township, Dunklin County, Missouri
- Union Township, Franklin County, Missouri
- Union Township, Harrison County, Missouri
- Union Township, Holt County, Missouri
- Union Township, Iron County, Missouri
- Union Township, Jasper County, Missouri
- Union Township, Laclede County, Missouri
- Union Township, Lewis County, Missouri
- Union Township, Lincoln County, Missouri
- Union Township, Marion County, Missouri
- Union Township, Monroe County, Missouri
- Union Township, Nodaway County, Missouri
- Union Township, Perry County, Missouri
- Union Township, Polk County, Missouri
- Union Township, Pulaski County, Missouri
- Union Township, Putnam County, Missouri
- Union Township, Randolph County, Missouri
- Union Township, Ripley County, Missouri
- Union Township, Ste. Genevieve County, Missouri
- Union Township, Scotland County, Missouri
- Union Township, Stone County, Missouri
- Union Township, Sullivan County, Missouri
- Union Township, Washington County, Missouri
- Union Township, Worth County, Missouri
- Union Township, Webster County, Missouri
- Union Township, Wright County, Missouri

== Nebraska ==
- Union Township, Butler County, Nebraska
- Union Township, Dodge County, Nebraska
- Union Township, Knox County, Nebraska
- Union Township, Phelps County, Nebraska
- Union Township, Saunders County, Nebraska

== New Jersey ==
- Union Township, Camden County, New Jersey, defunct township
- Union Township, Hudson County, New Jersey, defunct township
- Union Township, Hunterdon County, New Jersey
- Union Township, Union County, New Jersey

== North Carolina ==
- Union Township, Pender County, North Carolina
- Union Township, Randolph County, North Carolina
- Union Township, Robeson County, North Carolina
- Union Township, Rutherford County, North Carolina
- Union Township, Wilkes County, North Carolina

== North Dakota ==
- Union Township, North Dakota

== Ohio ==
- Union Township, Auglaize County, Ohio
- Union Township, Belmont County, Ohio
- Union Township, Brown County, Ohio
- Union Township, Carroll County, Ohio
- Union Township, Champaign County, Ohio
- Union Township, Clermont County, Ohio
- Union Township, Clinton County, Ohio
- Union Township, Fayette County, Ohio
- Union Township, Hancock County, Ohio
- Union Township, Highland County, Ohio
- Union Township, Knox County, Ohio
- Union Township, Lawrence County, Ohio
- Union Township, Licking County, Ohio
- Union Township, Logan County, Ohio
- Union Township, Madison County, Ohio
- Union Township, Mercer County, Ohio
- Union Township, Miami County, Ohio
- Union Township, Morgan County, Ohio
- Union Township, Muskingum County, Ohio
- Union Township, Pike County, Ohio
- Union Township, Putnam County, Ohio
- Union Township, Ross County, Ohio
- Union Township, Scioto County, Ohio
- Union Township, Tuscarawas County, Ohio
- Union Township, Union County, Ohio
- Union Township, Van Wert County, Ohio
- Union Township, Warren County, Ohio
- West Chester Township, Butler County, Ohio, formerly known as Union Township

== Oklahoma ==
- Union Township, Canadian County, Oklahoma
- Union Township, Garfield County, Oklahoma
- Union Township, Grady County, Oklahoma
- Union Township, Kingfisher County, Oklahoma
- Union Township, Lincoln County, Oklahoma
- Union Township, Payne County, Oklahoma
- Union Township, Washita County, Oklahoma
- Union Township, Woodward County, Oklahoma

== Pennsylvania ==
- Union Township, Adams County, Pennsylvania
- Union Township, Berks County, Pennsylvania
- Union Township, Centre County, Pennsylvania
- Union Township, Clearfield County, Pennsylvania
- Union Township, Crawford County, Pennsylvania
- Union Township, Erie County, Pennsylvania
- Union Township, Fulton County, Pennsylvania
- Union Township, Huntingdon County, Pennsylvania
- Union Township, Jefferson County, Pennsylvania
- Union Township, Lawrence County, Pennsylvania
- Union Township, Lebanon County, Pennsylvania
- Union Township, Luzerne County, Pennsylvania
- Union Township, Mifflin County, Pennsylvania
- Union Township, Schuylkill County, Pennsylvania
- Union Township, Snyder County, Pennsylvania
- Union Township, Tioga County, Pennsylvania
- Union Township, Union County, Pennsylvania
- Union Township, Washington County, Pennsylvania

== South Dakota ==
- Union Township, Brule County, South Dakota, in Brule County, South Dakota
- Union Township, Butte County, South Dakota
- Union Township, Davison County, South Dakota, in Davison County, South Dakota
- Union Township, Day County, South Dakota, in Day County, South Dakota
- Union Township, Edmunds County, South Dakota, in Edmunds County, South Dakota
- Union Township, Faulk County, South Dakota, in Faulk County, South Dakota
- Union Township, McCook County, South Dakota, in McCook County, South Dakota
- Union Township, Meade County, South Dakota, in Meade County, South Dakota
- Union Township, Moody County, South Dakota, in Moody County, South Dakota
- Union Township, Sanborn County, South Dakota, in Sanborn County, South Dakota
- Union Township, Spink County, South Dakota, in Spink County, South Dakota

== See also ==
- North Union Township (disambiguation)
- West Union Township (disambiguation)
- Union Grove Township (disambiguation)
- Union (disambiguation)
