= North Union =

North Union may refer to:

- North Union Railway, a British railway company formed in 1834
- North Union, Indiana, an unincorporated community
- North Union Township, Pennsylvania (disambiguation)
  - North Union Township, Fayette County, Pennsylvania
  - North Union Township, Schuylkill County, Pennsylvania
- North Union High School (disambiguation)
