= June 2010 tornado outbreak =

The June 2010 tornado outbreak may refer to the following tornado outbreaks:

- The tornado outbreak of June 5–6, 2010: An outbreak that produced 47 tornadoes across the Midwestern United States and the Lower Great Lakes on June 5–6, 2010, killing six in Ohio and one in Illinois
- The June 2010 Northern Plains tornado outbreak: An outbreak that produced over 60 reported tornadoes across the Northern Plains of the United States on June 17, 2010, killing at least three in Minnesota
