= Union Township, Michigan =

Union Township is a name or alternative name for several places in the United States:

- Union Township, Branch County, Michigan
- Union Township, Grand Traverse County, Michigan
- Union Charter Township, Michigan, in Isabella County

See also

- Union Township (disambiguation)
