= Union Township, Pennsylvania =

Union Township is the name of some places in the U.S. state of Pennsylvania:

- Union Township, Adams County, Pennsylvania
- Union Township, Berks County, Pennsylvania
- Union Township, Centre County, Pennsylvania
- Union Township, Clearfield County, Pennsylvania
- Union Township, Crawford County, Pennsylvania
- Union Township, Erie County, Pennsylvania
- Union Township, Fulton County, Pennsylvania
- Union Township, Huntingdon County, Pennsylvania
- Union Township, Jefferson County, Pennsylvania
- Union Township, Lawrence County, Pennsylvania
- Union Township, Lebanon County, Pennsylvania
- Union Township, Luzerne County, Pennsylvania
- Union Township, Mifflin County, Pennsylvania
- Union Township, Schuylkill County, Pennsylvania
- Union Township, Snyder County, Pennsylvania
- Union Township, Tioga County, Pennsylvania
- Union Township, Union County, Pennsylvania
- Union Township, Washington County, Pennsylvania

== See also ==
- East Union Township, Pennsylvania
- North Union Township, Fayette County, Pennsylvania
- North Union Township, Schuylkill County, Pennsylvania
- South Union Township, Pennsylvania
- Union Township (disambiguation)
