= Joseph Yoder =

American Mennonite writer (1872–1956)

Joseph Yoder (September 22, 1872 – November 13, 1956) was an educator, musicologist, and writer, the first successful Mennonite literary figure in the United States, especially known for his semi-fictional account of his mother's life, Rosanna of the Amish (1940), and for his investigation of the sources of the Amish tunes of the Ausbund, along with his efforts to record and preserve traditional Amish music.

== Life ==
Joseph Warren Yoder was born on September 22, 1872, in Belleville, Pennsylvania, United States, in the Kishacoquillas Valley (known locally as the Big Valley) region of Mifflin County. He received a traditional Amish education supplemented by participation in one of the "singing schools" that became popular in the Big Valley during the 1890s. He was a schoolteacher in Milltown, Pennsylvania, for two years from 1892 to 1894. He attended the Brethren Normal School (later Juniata College) in Huntingdon and was graduated in 1895. He later attended the Elkhart Institute (later Goshen College) in Indiana, also teaching English and music there. In 1898 he switched to Northwestern University in Illinois. He also taught at Lock Haven State Teachers College in Pennsylvania. Much of his subsequent working career he worked as a college recruiter for Juniata College in Pennsylvania. He also organized and conducted singing schools for Mennonites throughout that state. He additionally attempted to achieve reforms within the Amish and Mennonite churches in the Mifflin and Huntingdon County areas.

At almost age sixty he married Emily Lane of Lane's Mills, Jefferson County on February 18, 1932. They lived in Huntingdon, Pennsylvania. Late in life he taught at Belleville Mennonite School.

He commenced his writing career in reaction to the harsh depictions of another writer, Ruth Lininger Dobson, whose 1937 novel Straw in the Wind, written while she was a student at the University of Michigan, received that school's Hopwood Award. That book's depiction of the Amish of Indiana motivated Yoder to correct its harsh stereotypes with a better book about Amish life, so in 1940 he wrote Rosanna of the Amish, the story of his mother's life (and his own). He later wrote a sequel, Rosanna's Boys (1948), as well as other books presenting and recording what he regarded as a truer picture of Amish culture.

His musical background enabled him to transcribe traditional Amish slow music into musical notation (Amische Lieder, 1942). He documented what he and others feel are surprising historic parallels between some of the traditional Amish tunes and Gregorian Chant; some Amish were reportedly initially distressed by this kind of analysis. Much of the rest of his writing consists of recording Amish customs and of theological and Biblical exegesis relating to Amish practice, particularly the practice of Meidung, or shunning, of those who join and then later leave the Amish church.

Joseph Yoder died on November 13, 1956, in Huntingdon, Pennsylvania, of lung cancer. He is buried in the Locust Grove Cemetery in nearby Belleville.

== Works ==
- Rosanna of the Amish. Huntingdon, PA: Yoder Publishing Co., 1940.
- Amische Lieder. (Amish Songs). Huntingdon, PA: Yoder Publishing Co., 1942.
- Rosanna's Boys: A Sequel to Rosanna of the Amish. Huntingdon, PA: Yoder Publishing Co., 1948.
- Amish Traditions. Huntingdon, PA: Yoder Publishing Co., 1950.
- The Prayer Veil Analyzed. Huntingdon, PA: Yoder Publishing Co., 1954.
