= Renno Amish =

Religious denomination

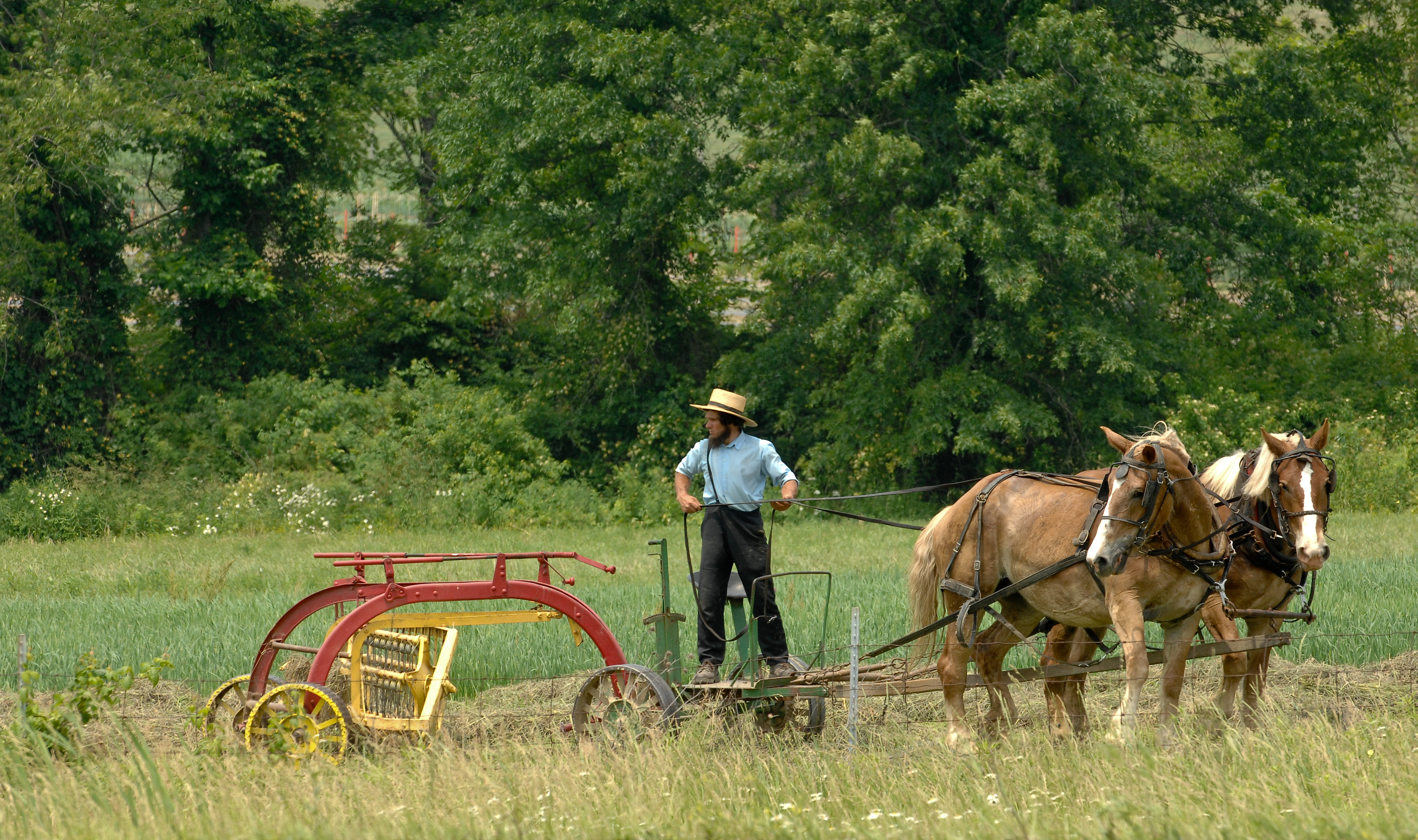
Amish man with only one suspender

The Renno Amish, also called Peachey Amish or "black toppers" are a subgroup of Amish that was formed in 1863 in Mifflin County, Pennsylvania. They are the moderately conservative Old Order Amish group in Kishacoquillas Valley, locally called Big Valley, but still relatively conservative compared with the Amish of other regions.

== History ==
Amish settled in Mifflin County as early as 1791, coming from Lancaster County, Pennsylvania. In the 1840s there were three Amish congregations in the region. In 1849 one district divided from the two others, forming the Byler Amish, the first subgroup in North America that divided because of doctrinal differences.

The Peachey Amish emerged from a conflict between two bishops of the remaining districts, Abraham Peachey, and Solomon Beiler, in the 1850s. Beiler was one of several Amish Bishops at that time that had begun to baptize his congregation in streams rather than homes, a practice that did not sit well with Peachey, who preferred the traditional method of house baptism. In 1861, when it became clear that the conflict could not be resolved, the two districts separated, with Peachey's district becoming the Peachey Amish. The group that followed Beiler became Amish Mennonites and eventually Mennonites.

== Belief and practice ==
The Renno Amish have a more relaxed attitude concerning dress and home decoration than other Old Order Amish of the region. Homes are painted white and barns are typically red as in many Amish groups. Half-length curtains and screens are commonly found in homes and indoor plumbing is allowed. Their Ordnung allows men to wear only one suspender, while women wear black bonnets. Because their buggies have black tops they are called "black toppers". There are also Amish with white (Nebraska Amish) and yellow (Byler Amish) tops in the Big Valley.

== Settlements and congregations ==
In 1900 the Peache y Amish—i.e., the Renno Amish—had 3 districts with 250 members, in 1956 they had 3 districts with 205 members. As of 2000, the Renno Amish had about a dozen church districts primarily in Pennsylvania. Around 2011 they had 19 congregations in four settlements in two states.
