= North Union High School =

North Union High School may refer to:

- North Union High School (Iowa), part of the North Union Community School District, Armstrong, Iowa, U.S.
- North Union High School (Ohio), Richwood, Ohio, U.S.

== See also ==
- North Union (disambiguation)
