= Byler Amish =

Religious denomination

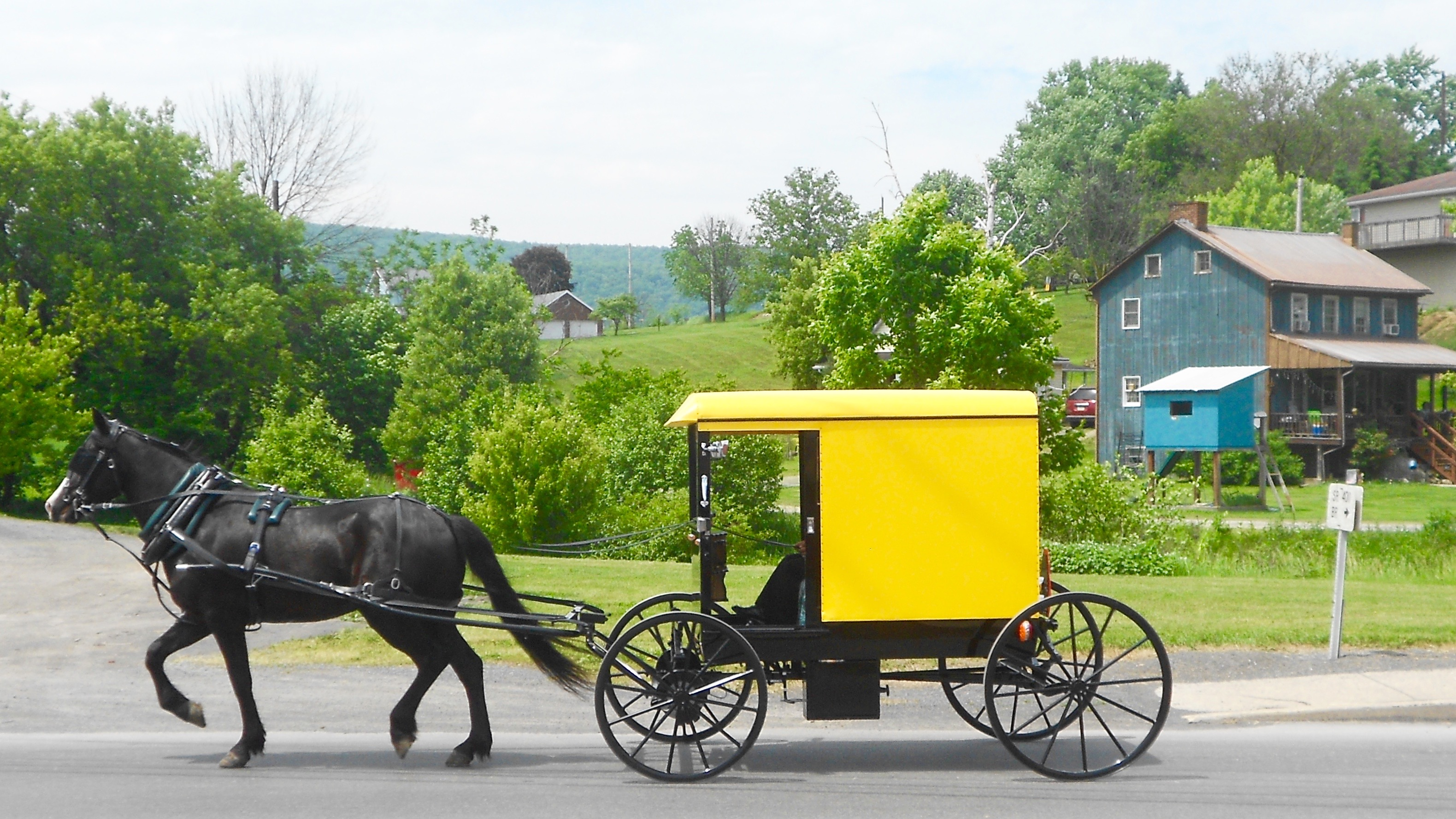
Yellow topped buggy of the Byler Amish in Belleville, Pennsylvania

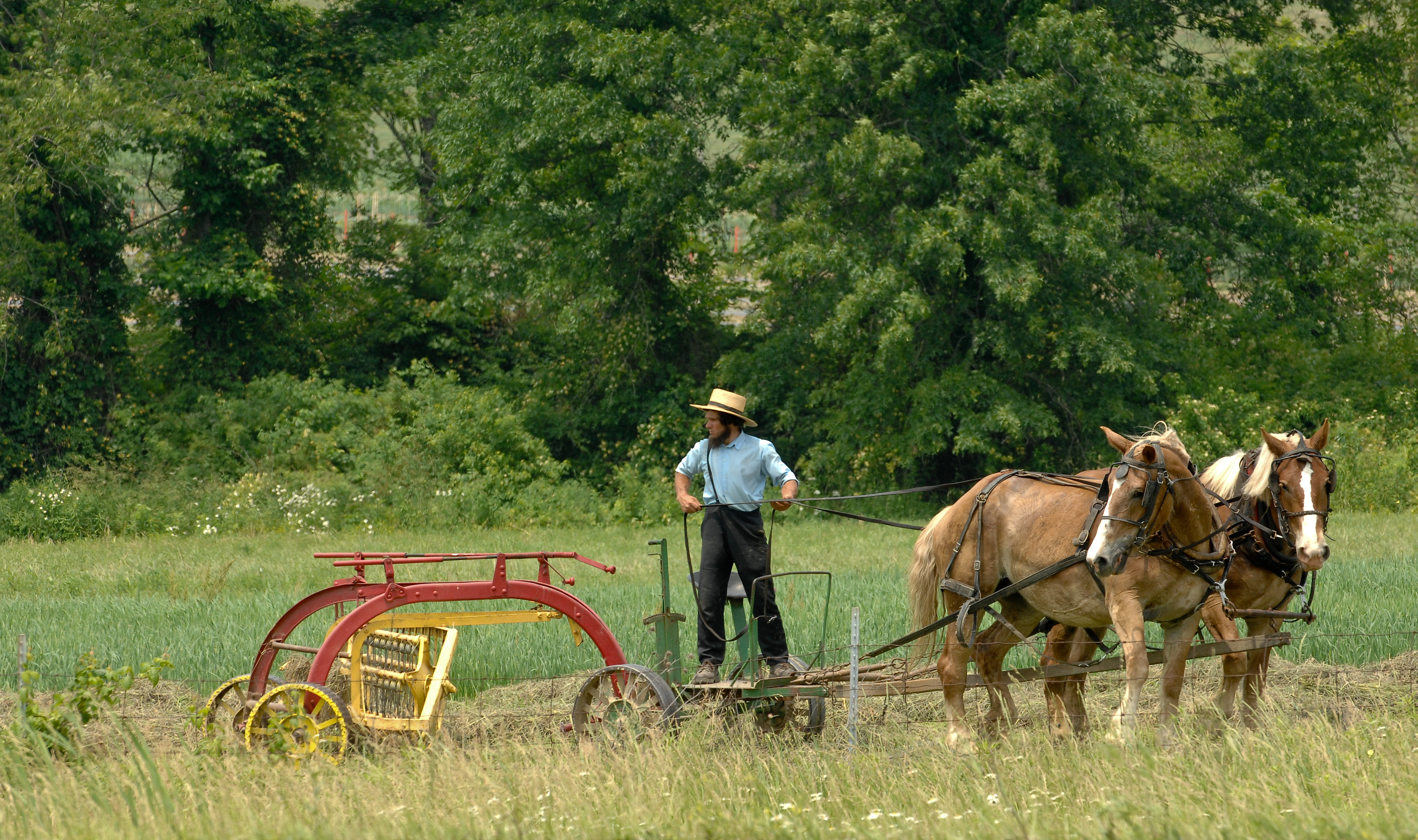
Amish man with only one suspender

The Byler Amish, also called Alt Gemee (Old Church), are a small conservative subgroup of the Amish. They are known for the yellow color of their buggies, which earned them the nickname "yellow-toppers" and for wearing only one suspender. They are the oldest Old Order Amish affiliation that separated for doctrinal and not for geographical reasons.

== History ==
Amish settled in the Mifflin County region of Pennsylvania as early as 1791, coming from Lancaster County, Pennsylvania. In the 1840s there were three Amish congregations in the region. In 1849 Samuel B. King, a conservative bishop who warned against adopting the use of rubber tires on buggies and who was also accused of giving sermons that were too long, was "silenced", that is he was removed from his ministerial duties. One of the three districts, the "lower" district sided with King and split from the other two districts. This split was actually the culmination of mounting tensions over several issues and led to more conservatism in this branch. In 1881 the Nebraska Amish, the most conservative group of Old Order Amish, split from the Byler Amish, led by Bishop Yost H. Yoder.

== Practice and belief ==
Byler Amish men wear only one suspender, like the Renno Amish, but shirts in different colors. Women wear brown bonnets. The use of tractors is allowed for belt power, but not for field work. In their homes, screens on doors and half-length curtains are allowed, while carpets are not.

== Members and congregations ==
In 1956 the Byler Amish had one church district with 40 members. In his 1981 book Plain Buggies Stephen Scott writes that the Byler Amish have "only one district around Belleville" and "about 90 members". As of 2000, the Byler had three churches in Mifflin County and are also affiliated with districts near New Wilmington, Pennsylvania. As of 2011, the Byler Amish had 5 church districts.
