= Tornado outbreak and derecho of June 16–18, 2010 =

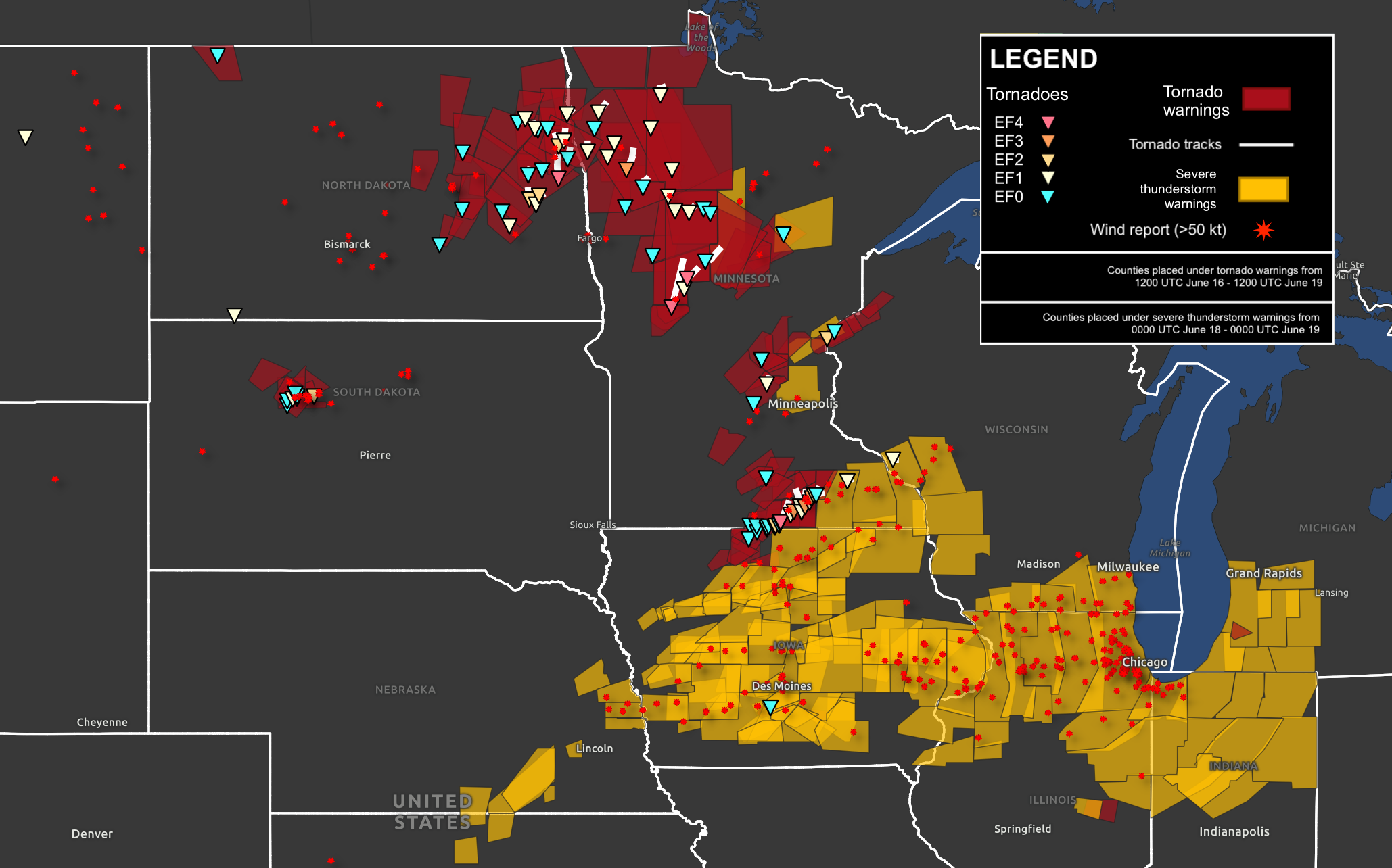
- Map of tornado warnings, confirmed tornadoes, wind reports and severe thunderstorm warnings from the outbreak and derechos (from June 16–18)

Meteorological history
- Duration: June 16–18, 2010

Tornado outbreak
- Tornadoes: 93 confirmed
- Max. rating: EF4 tornado
- Duration: 56 hours, 52 minutes
- Highest winds: Tornadic – 185 mph (298 km/h) (Holmes, North Dakota EF4 on June 17)
- Highest gusts: Non-tornadic – 90 mph (140 km/h) (Southwest Michigan, derecho on June 18)

Extratropical cyclone
- Lowest pressure: 986 hPa (mbar); 29.12 inHg
- Max. rainfall: 4–6 in (10–15 cm) in southern Alberta, Canada

Overall effects
- Fatalities: 3 fatalities (+ 2 non-tornadic)
- Injuries: 43 injuries
- Damage: $117.7 million (2010 USD)
- Areas affected: Northern Plains, Midwestern United States, Ohio Valley and southern Canada
- Part of the tornado outbreaks of 2010

One of the most prolific summer tornado outbreaks in the Northern Great Plains of the United States on record occurred from June 16–18, 2010. The outbreak began on June 16, with several tornadoes in South Dakota and Montana. The most intense storms took place the following day across much of eastern North Dakota and much of Minnesota. The system produced 93 tornadoes reported across four states while killing three people in Minnesota. Four of the tornadoes were rated as EF4 on the Enhanced Fujita scale, one in eastern North Dakota, and three in west-central and southern Minnesota. It was the most violent tornadoes in a 24-hour period since there were five within 15 hours in the 2008 Super Tuesday tornado outbreak.

Significant damage was reported west of Grand Forks, North Dakota, and in the Wadena, Minnesota, area, and a tornado emergency was issued for areas north of Wadena and again later for areas near Plummer, Minnesota, where significant damage was reported. Much of Wadena was destroyed by its tornado. Three people were killed; one in Almora, Minnesota, one in Mentor, Minnesota; and a third in Freeborn County, Minnesota. This was the region's first major tornado outbreak of the year and one of the largest on record in the region, comparable to a similar outbreak in June 1992. The 48 tornadoes that touched down in Minnesota on June 17 marked the most active single day in the state's history. June 17 was the second largest tornado day on record in the meteorological summer, behind the most prolific day of the 2003 South Dakota tornado outbreak on June 24, 2003.

Associated with the tornado outbreak was a destructive derecho, spawned by a cluster of thunderstorms over Nebraska that developed into a squall line over Iowa during the morning of June 18. This line swept eastward bringing 75 mph winds to Des Moines, Iowa and 60 mph winds to the Quad Cities. It continued across northern Illinois and extreme southern Wisconsin hitting Chicago at 1 pm bringing 70-80 mph winds to the city. The line continued into Michigan and Indiana dramatically growing in size, stretching from Danville, IL to Fort Wayne, IN to Lansing, MI. A 90 mph wind gust was recorded in La Porte, IN. Behind this line, a second squall line developed over northeast Iowa and traveled across the same areas as the first hitting the Quad Cities 6 hours after the first one and Chicago 5 hours after the first line. The first line began dissipating around 9pm EDT over Ohio while the second one would fall below severe limits. 2 people died in the first line while it is unclear if the second one met derecho criteria.

== Meteorological synopsis ==
=== June 16 ===
SPC outlooks on June 17, 2010.

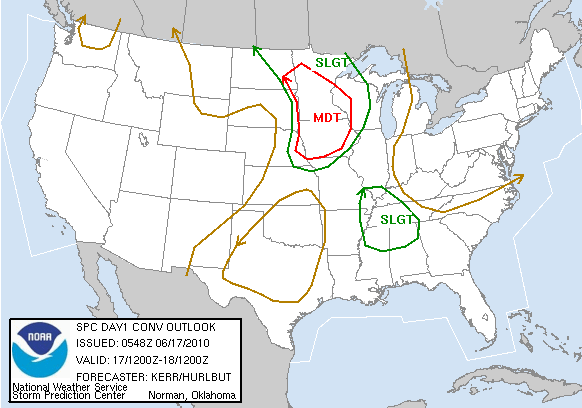
Day 1 06z categorical outlooks.

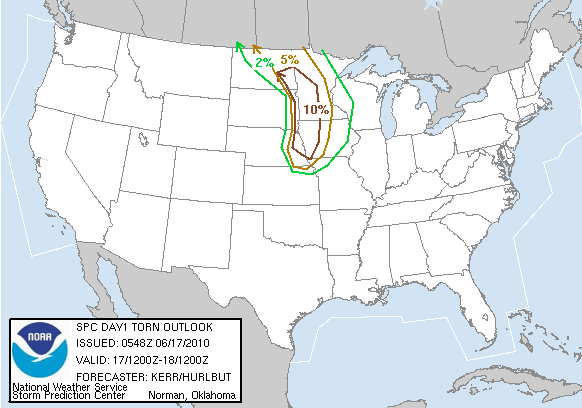
Day 1 06z tornado outlooks.

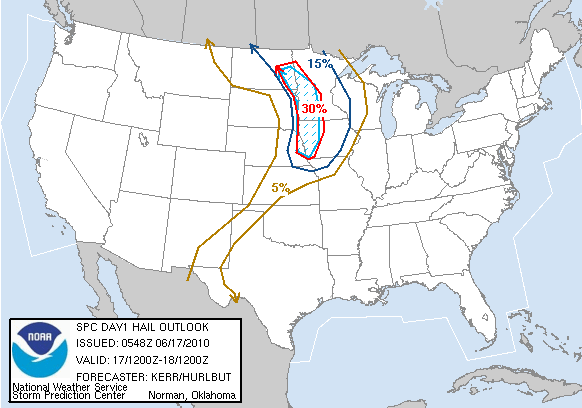
Day 1 06z hail outlooks.

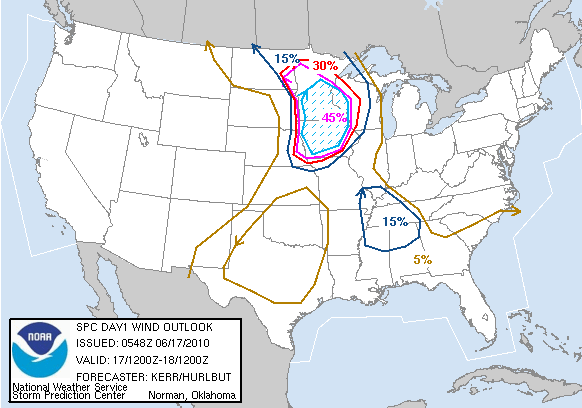
Day 1 06z wind outlooks.

On June 16, 2010, an upper-level area of low pressure and associated trough moved southeastward across the Rocky Mountains into the Great Plains. Along the base of the trough, the presence of a strong mid-level jet stream provided significant instability; however, warm-air aloft was expected to limit the extent of convective development. Moderate to strong deep layer wind shear along with steep lapse rates would allow for the development of supercell thunderstorms with large hail (greater than 2 in (5.1 cm) in diameter). In light of this, the Storm Prediction Center issued a slight-risk of severe weather for portions of Colorado, Montana, Nebraska, North Dakota, South Dakota and Wyoming.

=== June 17–18 ===
The Storm Prediction Center issued a moderate risk of severe weather for June 17, 2010, citing a 10% threat for tornadoes, 45% threat for large hail and 45% threat for damaging wind, initially thinking tornadoes would quickly reform into a straight-line wind event. The moderate risk area extended from around Fargo, North Dakota, to Des Moines, Iowa, and Omaha, Nebraska, including the Twin Cities area, with a slight risk area extending across the Upper Midwest. Surface dew points reached the low 70s °F (low 20s °C) with surface temperatures well into 80s °F (near 30 °C) across Minnesota. Surface-based CAPE values were forecast to reach 2000–3000 J/kg.

The first tornadoes were reported across eastern North Dakota during the mid-afternoon where a tornado watch was issued for most of the state as well as extreme northwestern Minnesota closer to the Manitoba and northwestern Ontario borders where many tornadoes, some strong to violent, touched down late that afternoon. After several tornadoes affected areas near the Grand Forks area and closer to the Canada–US border, the activity eventually shifted into northwestern Minnesota by the late afternoon while storms over northern Iowa moved across southern Minnesota near the Interstate 90 corridor producing many tornadoes. Other storms developed over central Minnesota near Interstate 94 but most activity missed the Twin Cities area. The supercells eventually reached the Wisconsin border later that evening and reformed into a squall line, rapidly ending the severe weather outbreak. Isolated tornado reports also occurred across Wisconsin and Iowa. Three people were killed according to KARE-TV including one in Mentor (Polk County), one in Almora (Otter Tail County) and one near Albert Lea (Freeborn County) an area that sustained heavy damage from a long-tracked EF4 tornado. Large tornadoes were sighted in Kiester in Faribault County and near Ellendale and Blooming Prairie in Steele County, Minnesota.

The town of Wadena was also hard hit; the high school was heavily damaged by a tornado that prompted a tornado emergency. Extensive damage was also reported in various other communities in Minnesota as well as in North Dakota from either tornadoes or widespread damaging winds such as in the Rochester, Minnesota, area where several buildings, including homes, were heavily damaged on the northern side of the town. A local emergency was declared in Rochester by the mayor following the storms. The three tornado fatalities in Minnesota were the most for a single outbreak since 1978, and the three EF4 tornadoes were the most on a single day since 1967.

A moderate risk of severe weather was issued for parts of southern Iowa, northern Missouri and northwestern Illinois during the mid-morning of June 18 citing mostly the threat for damaging winds (45%), though a few tornadoes would be possible as CAPE values of 4000 j/kg were forecast across the Missouri and mid-Mississippi Valleys, especially behind the main derecho. Such did not materialize, however.

== Confirmed tornadoes ==
Confirmed tornadoes by Enhanced Fujita rating
EFU	EF0	EF1	EF2	EF3	EF4	EF5	Total
0	48	28	9	4	4	0	93

=== Almora–Deer Creek–Bluffton, Minnesota ===
Almora–Deer Creek–Bluffton, Minnesota
- The massive EF4 tornado at peak width.

Meteorological history
- Formed: June 17, 2010, 3:43 p.m. CDT (UTC−05:00)
- Dissipated: June 17, 2010, 4:45 p.m. CDT (UTC−05:00)
- Duration: 1 hour, 2 minutes

EF4 tornado
- on the Enhanced Fujita scale
- Highest winds: 175 mph (282 km/h)

Overall effects
- Fatalities: 1
- Injuries: 5

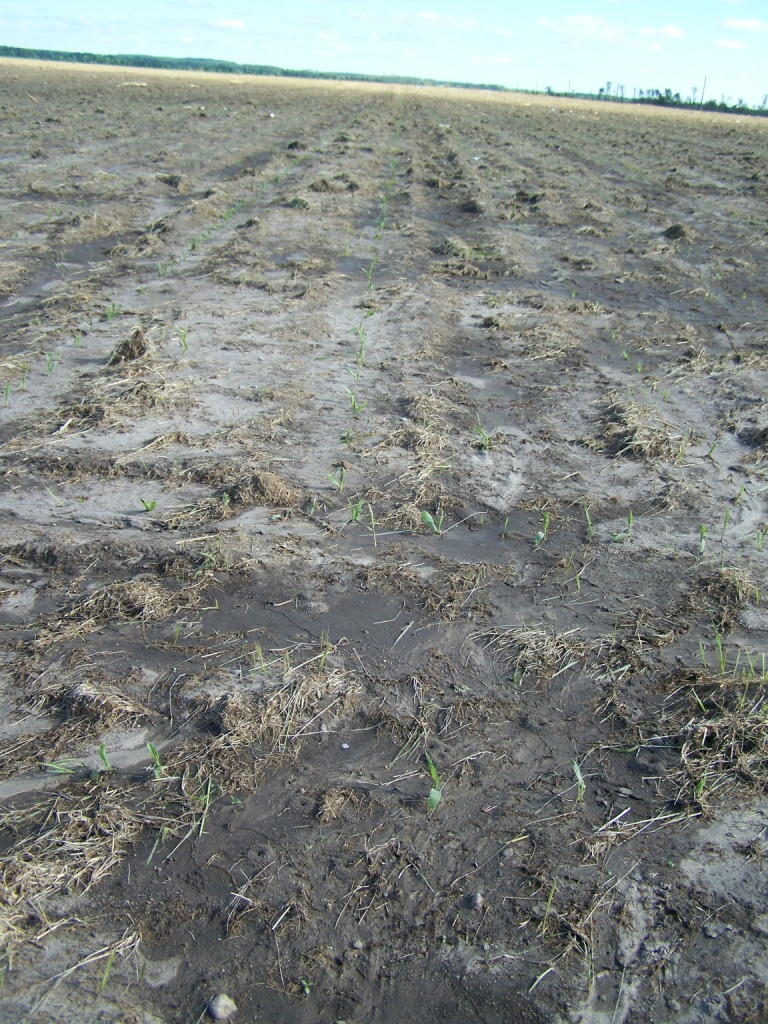
Heavy scouring of farm fields caused by the tornado.

At approximately 3:43 p.m. CDT (2043 UTC), a long-lived tornado touched down in northern Douglas County, southeast of Urbank. Numerous trees were broken and snapped at EF1 intensity at this point. The tornado would also display strong multiple-vortex characteristics at this time, as it began to cross over into Otter Tail County to the north, where it would cause immense damage across eastern parts of the county. The tornado caused mostly insignificant damage as it passed west of Parkers Prairie, until it approached the small community of Almora. Just to the south, a farmhouse was destroyed, where a woman was killed. The tornado would approach Almora to the east, narrowly avoiding a direct hit, though some homes on the eastern side suffered some levels of damage.

The tornado would head more northeast and widen to 2,288 yd (2,092 m) or 1.3 mi wide as it began to pass southeast of Deer Creek. The massive tornado would level many rural homes in the vicinity, as it continued to intensify even further. Along a county highway, the tornado would become violent as it wiped seven farmhouses off their foundations at EF4 intensity southwest of Bluffton. Many trees were extensively debarked and outbuildings were blown away as the tornado headed due north, passing west of Bluffton and demolishing more farmsteads.

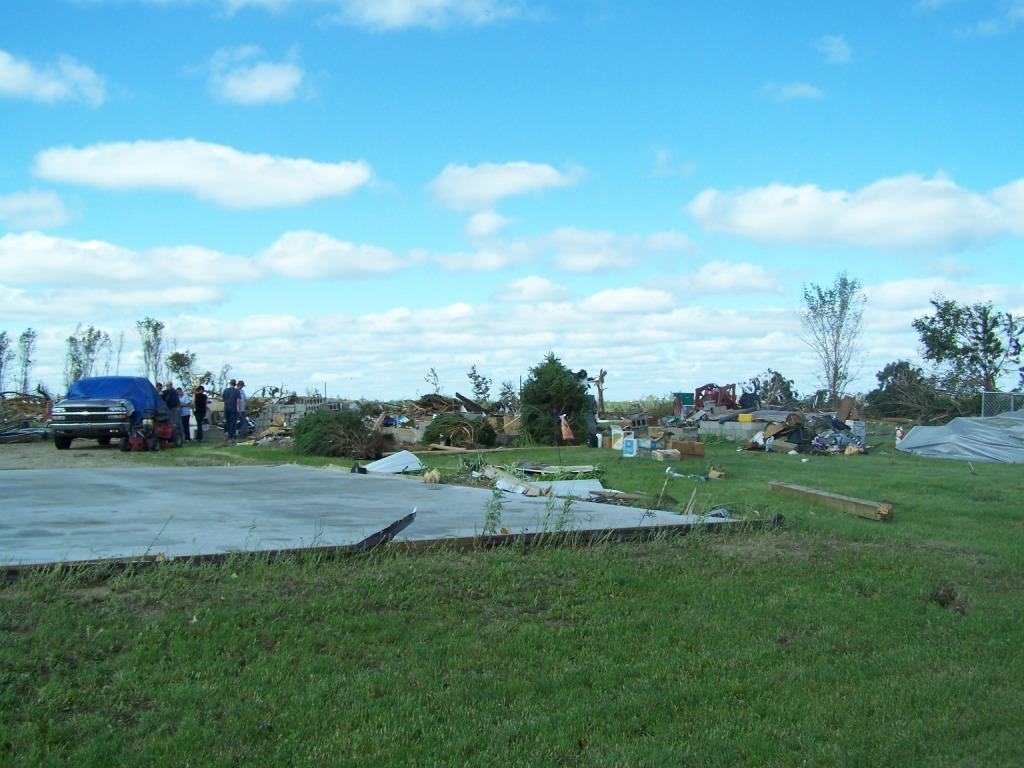
A destroyed farmstead in Otter Tail County.

After several miles, the storm would start to weaken. At 4:45 p.m. CDT (2145 UTC) the tornado would dissipate northeast of New York Mills, after being on the ground for more than an hour, and tracking for 39.56 mi (63.67 km).

It was the first of four tornadoes to be classified as EF4 during the historic outbreak. It as well was it the first time a violent tornado struck the state of Minnesota, since the F4 tornado that struck Granite Falls on July 25, 2000. The Almora–Bluffton tornado was also the longest tracked, and longest lived event of the entire June 17 outbreak, as it traversed for nearly 40 mi (64 km) through for almost the entire eastern side of Otter Tail County, in the west-central parts of Minnesota. It was also the largest tornado of the outbreak by width, as it spanned over a mile and a quarter along portions of its track. A separate and long-lived supercell produced another violent EF4 tornado, with that one touching down a few minutes after this tornado passed through in the same area, crossing over into neighboring Wadena County and impact Wadena proper.

This tornado was featured on the Storm Chasers TV series, on the Discovery Channel. Storm chaser Reed Timmer and Team Dominator in their Dominator 1 interceptor vehicle, were having a competitive showdown with Sean Casey and his Tornado Intercept Vehicle (TIV) crew in their TIV 2, as they were intercepting the EF4 Almora–Bluffton tornado.

=== Mayville–Holmes–Thompson, North Dakota ===
Mayville–Holmes–Thompson, North Dakota
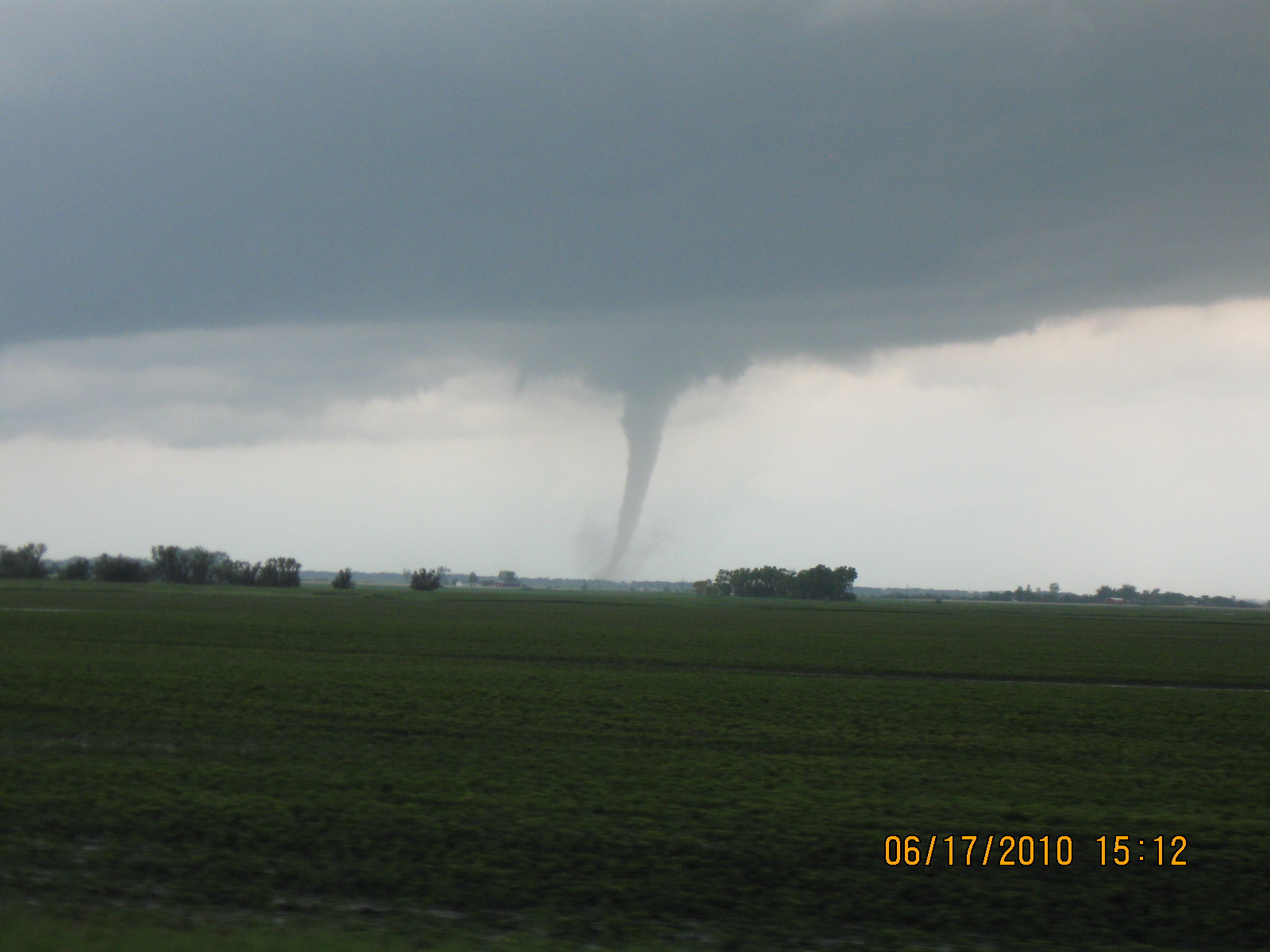
- A photo of the violent tornado near Holmes.

Meteorological history
- Formed: June 17, 2010, 3:49 p.m. CDT (UTC−05:00)
- Dissipated: June 17, 2010, 4:18 p.m. CDT (UTC−05:00)
- Duration: 29 minutes

EF4 tornado
- on the Enhanced Fujita scale
- Highest winds: 185 mph (298 km/h)

Overall effects
- Fatalities: 0
- Injuries: 1

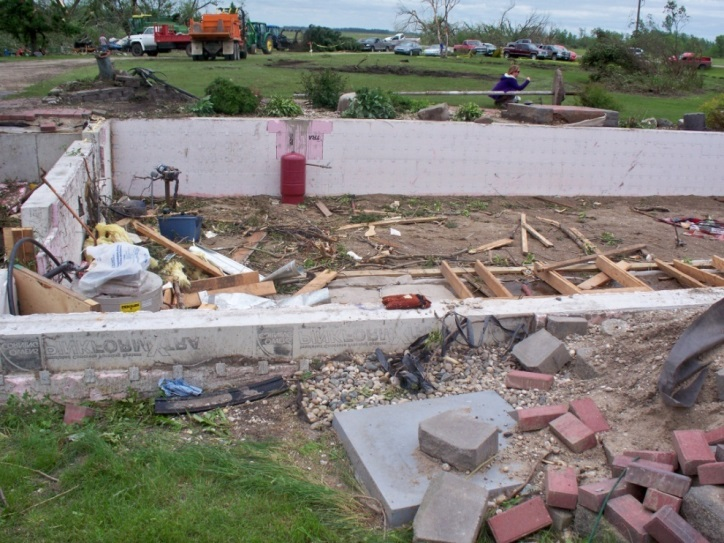
A farmhouse was swept off its foundation in the Holmes area, west of Thompson.

This narrow but violent drillbit tornado touched down north to northeast of Mayville, at 3:49 p.m. CDT (2049 UTC). Approximately 5.5 mi (8.9 km) to the north of town in rural Traill County, the tornado impacted a farm shop, completely destroying the structure. One man on the property was inside and was covered under piles of rubble, surviving with cuts to his hand. The tornado caused severe damage to the nearby outbuildings on the property, but didn't disturb the contents of a storage building, nor a desk that was located in the middle of the shop.

The tornado continued its journey, heading north and approaching the Traill–Grand Forks County border, to the east of Hatton. Many trees in shelterbelts and in farmsteads were snapped, uprooted, or sheared off. Law enforcement from the Traill County Sheriff's Office recorded the tornado as it was seen churning across the fields. The tornado began to occlude, but intensify even further as it began approaching the Holmes area in Grand Forks County.

Along one road in the vicinity, nine miles west to southwest of Thompson, the tornado would impact a farmstead at peak intensity. The main residence was completely swept off its foundation, leaving only an empty basement behind, and numerous trees and outbuildings nearby were destroyed. A chair was found thrown into a tree, while another had a computer hard drive found embedded within. After exiting the property, the tornado would continue to weaken and after two miles traveling, would dissipate to the west of Thompson at 4:18 p.m. CDT (2118 UTC).

This tornado traveled for 17 mi (27 km) across the two counties, and lasted for nearly half an hour. It was the only violent tornado of the outbreak to occur in North Dakota. It was also the highest rated, reaching winds in the upper echelon of EF4 intensity. It was one of the last violent (EF4+) tornadoes to occur in the state of North Dakota, until an EF5 tornado occurred over 15 years, and 3 days later on June 20, 2025.

=== Stevens County–Cass County, Minnesota supercell ===
Stevens County–Cass County, Minnesota supercell
- A rain-wrapped EF4 tornado approaching Wadena

Meteorological history
- Formed: June 17, 2010, 3:20 p.m. CDT (UTC−05:00)
- Dissipated: June 17, 2010, 6:30 p.m. CDT (UTC−05:00)
- Duration: 3 hours, 10 minutes

Tornado family
- Tornadoes: 3
- Max. rating: EF4 tornado
- Highest winds: 170 mph (270 km/h)

Overall effects
- Fatalities: 0
- Injuries: 20
- Damage: $32 million (2010 USD)

Confirmed tornadoes by Enhanced Fujita rating
EFU	EF0	EF1	EF2	EF3	EF4	EF5	Total
0	1	1	0	0	1	0	6

Around 3:20 p.m. CDT (2120 UTC), a supercell thunderstorm developed over Stevens County, Minnesota, and initially tracked north-northeastward before turning fully northeast. Once over Otter Tail County, the storm intensified and a brief EF1 tornado touched down around 4:48 pm CDT (2248 UTC) southeast of Deer Creek. The rear-flank downdraft of the storm quickly obscured the tornado from view; however, it was later determined the tornado was on the ground for 1.5 mi (2.4 km), uprooting small trees and snapping limbs of larger ones. Two minutes prior at 4:56 pm CDT (2256 UTC), a tornado warning was issued for portions of Becker, Clearwater, Hubbard, Otter Tail and Wadena Counties.

A few minutes after the warning was issued, the second and strongest tornado the storm produced, rated low-end EF4 touched down about 3 mi (4.8 km) southwest of the city of Wadena, in Otter Tail County. Within three minutes of forming, this violent multiple vortex tornado rapidly intensified, producing extreme tree damage with many trees snapped or uprooted as it moved northeast. Before crossing the Otter Tail-Wadena County border, the storm's width had reached 1,936 yd (1,770 m), or 1.1 mi.

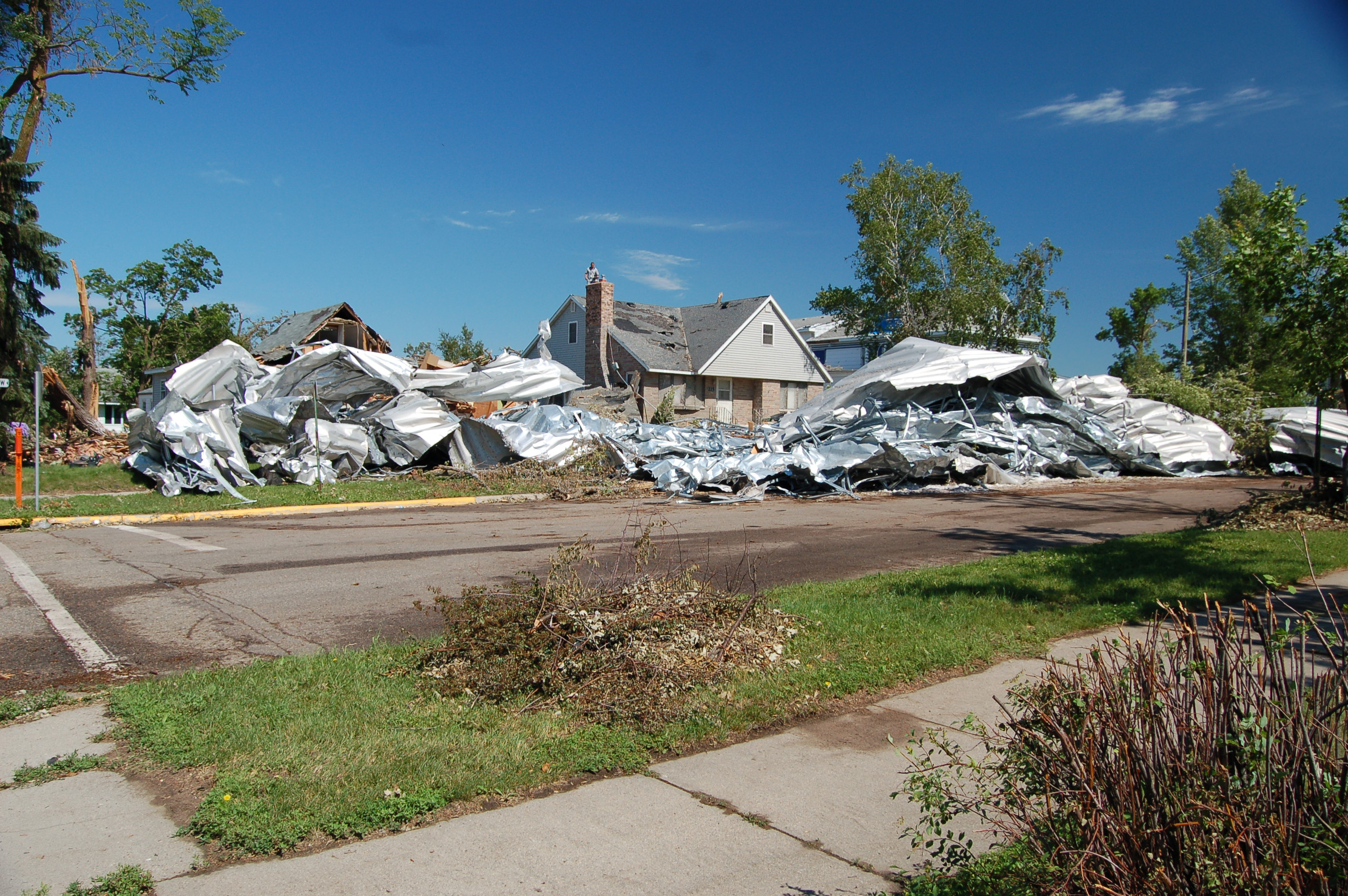
Tornado damage in the city of Wadena.

The tornado then struck the western side of Wadena, causing widespread severe damage. Two houses were blown away from their foundations and many other houses and businesses were destroyed by this large wedge tornado. Many other structures were damaged to lesser degrees as well. Wadena-Deer Creek Middle/High School lost large sections of its roof and suffered extensive damage to its interior. A bus garage and an apartment complex were also damaged, and school buses were thrown into the air. Trees were also debarked and snapped throughout the town. Cars were tossed by the tornado and headstones were toppled at a cemetery in Wadena. About 20 people were injured. Damage from the tornado reached $32 million, making it the most destructive of the outbreak. In light of the damage in the city, a tornado emergency was declared for Sebeka and Nimrod; however, substantial damage never took place in these areas. Continuing northeastward, the tornado gradually weakened before dissipating at 5:16 pm CDT (2316 UTC), ending its 10 mi (16 km) track.

At 5:30 pm CDT (2230 UTC), a third tornado, rated EF0, touched down within the supercell, this time roughly 1.5 mi (2.4 km) south-southwest of Nimrod. Over the following 18 minutes, this storm made several touchdowns along a 14.8 mi (23.8 km) track that continued into Cass County. Damage from this tornado was largely limited to broken tree limbs. Continuing northeast, the supercell eventually dissipated over Cass County around 6:30 pm CDT (2330 UTC).

=== Conger–Albert Lea–Manchester–Hartland, Minnesota ===
Conger–Albert Lea–Manchester–Hartland, Minnesota
- The tornado north of Albert Lea

Meteorological history
- Formed: June 17, 2010, 6:33 p.m. CDT (UTC−05:00)
- Dissipated: June 17, 2010, 7:15 p.m. CDT (UTC−05:00)
- Duration: 42 minutes

EF4 tornado
- on the Enhanced Fujita scale
- Highest winds: 175 mph (282 km/h)

Overall effects
- Fatalities: 1
- Injuries: 14

This large, violent tornado touched down west of Mansfield at 6:33 p.m. CDT (2333 UTC), and passed by areas west and north of the Albert Lea area, producing very intense damage early in its life where a home on the edge of the circulation sustained roof and siding damage, a barn was destroyed down to its brick foundation, a vehicle was flipped, and some trees showed debarking.

As the tornado intensified further across Freeborn County, it caused extensive crop damage in a wide swath with fields raked down to bare stalks. At several farmsteads, the tornado completely destroyed multiple swine barns, blew away empty grain bins, toppled a tall wind turbine tower, and left soybean fields nearly unrecognizable. The tornado maintained strong intensity while toppling silos, flattening additional farm buildings, and knocking down large numbers of trees.

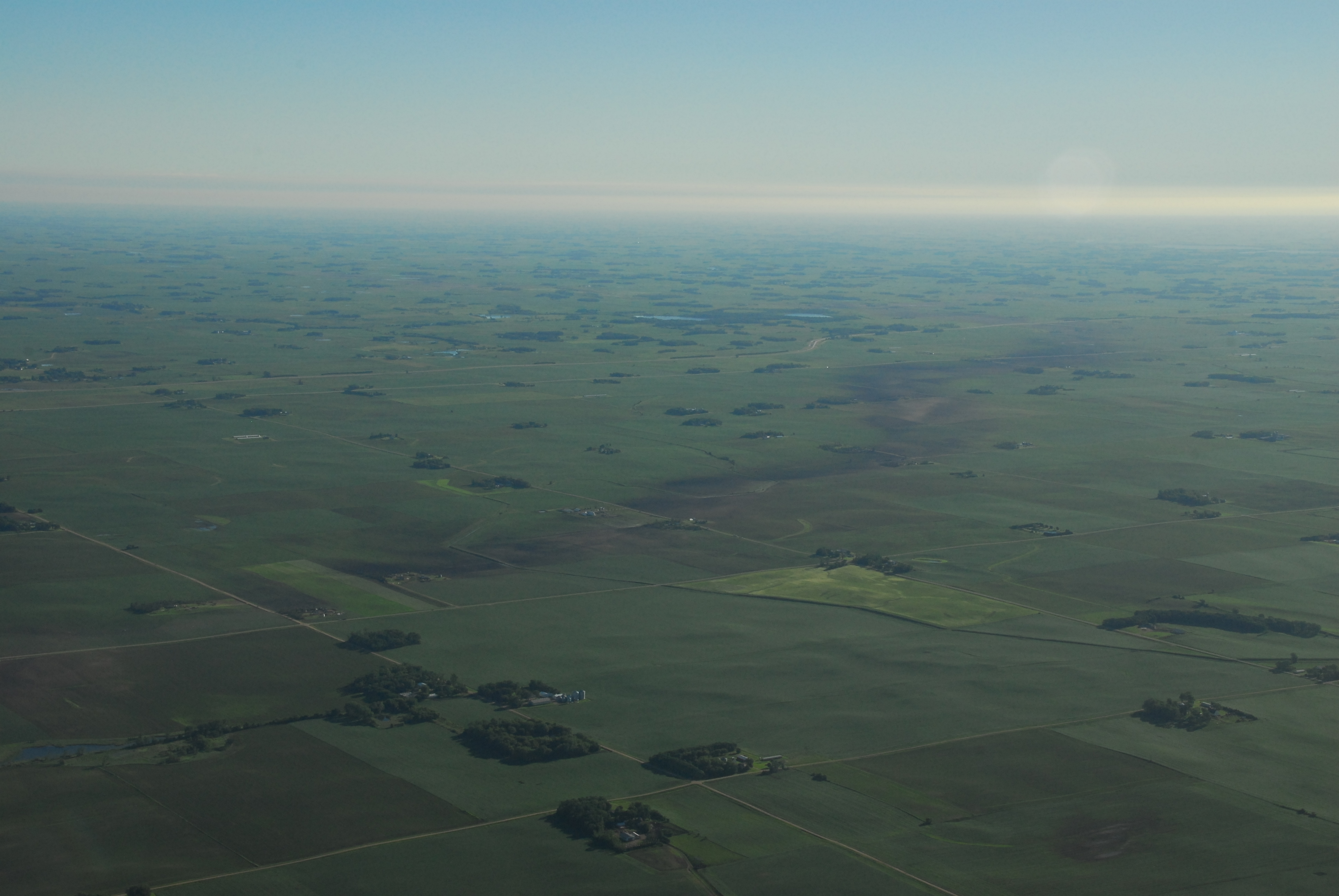
Aerial view of field scouring in western Freeborn County.

It then reached its peak strength north of Conger as it completely destroyed a farmhouse, barn, and other buildings, extensively debarked trees, and tumbled a car more than half a mile into an open field. After slightly weakening, the tornado continued to destroy and severely damage additional homes, barns, and grain bins, including rotating a house off its foundation. Debris from destroyed structures was lofted long distances, with sheet metal carried as far as I-90, which the tornado later crossed while re-intensifying. Several farmsteads suffered total losses in this phase, including homes and multiple barns, and the tornado widened to nearly a mile across.

Farther north, the tornado gradually weakened but continued to damage grain bins, trees, and farm structures before narrowing and dissipating west of Hartland, along a 16.91 mi (27.21 km) path at 7:15 p.m. CDT (0015 UTC). One woman was killed inside a manufactured home near Armstrong. Fourteen people were injured.

== Non-tornadic impacts ==
=== Canadian Prairies flooding ===
North of the tornadic supercells, heavy rain affected areas of the southern Canadian Prairies where at least 4 to 6 in (100 to 150 mm) of rain fell across southern Alberta and Saskatchewan on June 16 – 17 causing widespread flooding. A state of emergency was declared at the Blood Tribe Indian Reserve where people were stranded in homes due to flood waters. Nine municipal governments in Alberta also declared state of emergencies due to the flooding as did some areas of southern Saskatchewan. Portions of the Trans-Canada Highway were closed for 3 km (1.9 mi) due to flooding along the border between Saskatchewan and Alberta on June 18 and remained shut down until June 26. At times, 30,000 to 40,000 acres (12,000 to 16,000 ha) of land around the highway was submerged by flood waters. Other roads and bridges were flooded and in some cases washed away. The Cypress Hills Interprovincial Park was also left inaccessible. In and around Medicine Hat, Alberta, most residents were forced to evacuate as water reached depths of 2 ft (0.61 m). Agricultural areas sustained considerable losses throughout the region as entire harvests were lost to the floods and much of the growing season had past leaving no time to re-plant crops. Throughout Alberta, losses reached C$69 million ($70.3 million), including C$54 million ($55 million) in Medicine Hat alone. A total of 340 homes were affected by the floods, 11 of which had to be condemned. Additionally, 490 ft (150 m) of the Trans-Canada Highway had been washed out.

Due to the prolonged shut down of the Trans-Canada Highway, many businesses along the road experienced hundreds of thousands of dollars in lost profits. Some stores reported a 95 percent decrease in income, roughly C$4,000 daily. On June 25, some residents in Medicine Hat were given C$3,000 in aid from the Provincial Disaster Assistance Program. In the weeks after the disaster, reconstruction of roadways and bridges washed out by the floods began. Engineers estimated that it would take four to five weeks to repair the Trans-Canada Highway.

=== June 18 Midwest derechos ===
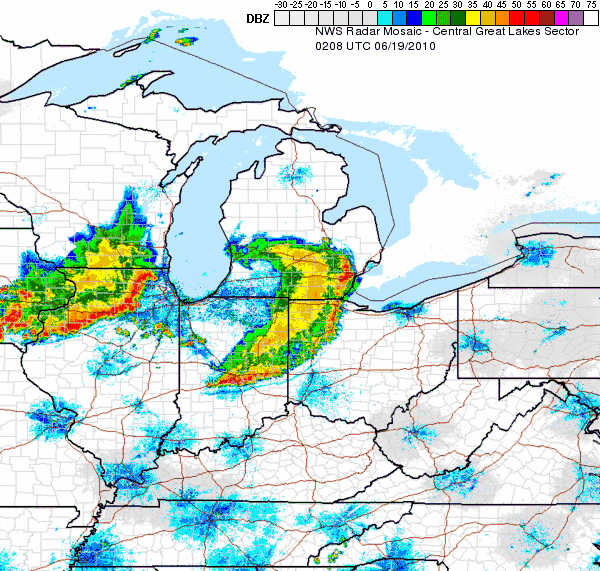
A NWS enhanced radar image of the two derechos in the Midwest on the night of June 18th, 2010.

Following the prolific tornado outbreak, a mesoscale convective system developed across eastern Nebraska in the Omaha area during the morning of June 18. It gradually intensified before moving into the Des Moines area near midday. The bow echo intensified into an intense progressive derecho over eastern Iowa and propagated eastward into northern Illinois and southern Wisconsin that afternoon. Extensive damage was reported from the derecho, including in the Chicago metropolitan area as the derecho reached that region shortly before 4:00 pm CDT (2100 UTC). Nearly 300,000 customers lost power and windows were blown out of high-rise buildings in downtown Chicago. Some counties utilized warning sirens due to the derecho's extreme winds, despite the fact that there was no formal tornado warning.

The derecho continued eastward, maintaining its strength over southern Lower Michigan and northern Indiana in the early evening. Winds as high as 90 mph (140 km/h) were reported in southwest Michigan with widespread damage over the region). The storm knocked out power to nearly 300,000 customers of Commonwealth Edison in the Chicago area. Windows were blown out of several high rises in downtown Chicago, including the tallest building, the Willis Tower. More than 100,000 lost power in the immediate Detroit region including in Oakland and Wayne Counties, over 75,000 in the Grand Rapids/Kalamazoo regions and over 50,000 in northern Indiana and southwestern Michigan. The derecho finally weakened and rapidly dissipated as it reached Lake Erie.

During the evening of June 18, a second, weaker derecho formed over Iowa and began following a path similar to the first one, and by 8:45 pm CDT (0145 UTC) the storm was moving across Illinois causing damage in areas already affected by the initial derecho event before weakening and dissipating. One fatality was reported from the event in northern Indiana and in Dexter, Michigan. This storm also produced dangerous lightning with two homes hit by lightning in Dexter and Scio Township in Michigan.

== Aftermath ==
=== Recovery and efforts ===
The day following the outbreak, the Minnesota National Guard arrived into Wadena to help residents and provide assistance. This was issued by former Minnesota governor Tim Pawlenty in response to the severe tornado and weather outbreak in the region. The Wadena City Council, which consisted of county commissioners from Wadena and Otter Tail counties, declared the city to be a major disaster area. Then preliminary assessments concluded that the tornado significantly damaged about 234 homes and 20 city blocks in southwestern and northwestern Wadena. On June 22, FEMA and state surveyors assessed the damage in the city, and several counties throughout northwestern and southern Minnesota, whether a major disaster declaration was sufficient to be granted by former US President Barack Obama. On July 2, the Obama administration granted a federal emergency declaration (FEMA-1921-DR) for Minnesota. Areas that were affected by the severe weather events were Faribault, Freeborn, Olmsted, Polk, Steele, Otter Tail and Wadena counties, as parts of the state were also flooded after the tornadoes, which lasted until June 26.

== See also ==
- Weather of 2010
- List of F4 and EF4 tornadoes
  - List of F4 and EF4 tornadoes (2010–2019)
- List of North American tornadoes and tornado outbreaks
- Tornado outbreak of June 16–18, 2014 – A violent tornado outbreak that occurred across portions of the northern Great Plains exactly 4 years later
- Tornado outbreak and derecho of June 19–22, 2025 – Another historic tornado outbreak and derecho that swept across the northern Great Plains and United States 15 years later
  - 2025 Enderlin tornado – A historic EF5 tornado that swept across southeastern North Dakota, becoming the first violent tornado in the state in 15 years
