= Belleville Mennonite School =

Belleville Christian School

Location
- 4105 Front Mountain Road; Belleville, Pennsylvania 17004; United States; 40.5912°N 77.7270°W

Information
- School type: Private with Public Grants, Christian
- Opened: 1945
- School district: Mifflin County School District
- Superintendent: Nicholas Wilson
- Principal: Nicholas Wilson
- Grades: Pre-k–12
- Enrollment: 235
- Average class size: 16
- Hours in school day: 8:00 AM to 3:02 PM
- Campus type: Rural
- Colors: Red and White
- Mascot: Thunder
- Website: www.bmsprek12.org

Belleville Christian School is located in Belleville, Pennsylvania, United States. It is situated between Stone Mountain and Jacks' Mountain. The valley they form is known as Big Valley. Belleville Mennonite is a member of the Association of Christian Schools International.

This private, Christian school is currently led by superintendent, Nicholas Wilson, along with high school principal, Mr. Jon Farley, middle school principal, Mrs. Jessica Geissinger, and elementary principal, Mrs. Becky Williams. The school educates around 235 students with more 25 faculty members.

Belleville Mennonite School underwent a rebranding beginning in the 2012–2013 school year. First, the school introduced a new mascot known as the "Belleville Thunder". Later, they made changes in their public image by introducing a new website and logo. "The new logo features a thunder bolt. In the summer of 2025, they will change to Belleville Christian School."

== History ==
The school was founded in 1945 by assimilated Mennonites in order to establish control over the education of their children at a time of school reorganization. At first, it was considered to be a complete Mennonite school, based on the community's religion. The school is now more diverse and is the largest Christian school in Mifflin County.

== Academic standards ==
The 2007 PSSA test score results showed that BMS students performed above the national average.

== Notable faculty ==
- Joseph Yoder (22 September 1872 - 13 November 1956), educator, musicologist, and writer who taught at the school.
