= Union Grove Township =

Union Grove may refer to:

- Union Grove Township, Whiteside County, Illinois
- Union Grove Township, Meeker County, Minnesota
- Union Grove Township, Iredell County, North Carolina
