= West Union Township, Todd County, Minnesota =

West Union Township, Minnesota
- Township
- Location within the state of Minnesota West Union Township, Minnesota (the United States)
- Coordinates: 45°48′30″N 95°3′57″W
- Country: United States
- State: Minnesota
- County: Todd

Area
  - Total: 29.7 sq mi (76.8 km^{2})
  - Land: 28.8 sq mi (74.7 km^{2})
  - Water: 0.81 sq mi (2.1 km^{2})
- Elevation: 1,332 ft (406 m)

Population (2020)
  - Total: 254
  - Density: 11/sq mi (4.2/km^{2})
- Time zone: UTC-6 (Central (CST))
  - Summer (DST): UTC-5 (CDT)
- ZIP code: 56389
- Area code: 320
- FIPS code: 27-69754
- GNIS feature ID: 0665974

West Union Township is a township in Todd County, Minnesota, United States. The population was 312 at the 2000 census and 254 in the 2020 census. The incorporated village of West Union is within the township of the same name.

West Union Township was organized on March 12, 1867.

== Geography ==
According to the United States Census Bureau, the township has a total area of 29.7 square miles (76.8 km^{2}); 28.8 square miles (74.7 km^{2}) is land and 0.8 square mile (2.1 km^{2}) (2.73%) is water.

Guernsey Lake is in Section 1 of the township. The Lake is 121.08 acres with a maximum dept of 19 feet. Some of the fish species include black bullhead, black crappie, bluegill, brown bullhead, green sunfish, hybrid sunfish, large mouth bass, and northern pike. The Lake has a public water access located where the Sauk River enters the lake. William Lake is in parts of Sections 12 and 13.

== Demographics ==
As of the census of 2000, there were 312 people, 97 households, and 89 families residing in the township. The population density was 10.8 people per square mile (4.2 people/km^{2}). There were 103 housing units at an average density of 3.6 units per square mile (1.4 units/km^{2}). The racial makeup of the township was 98.72% White, 0.96% Native American and 0.32% Asian.

There were 97 households, out of which 45.4% had children under the age of 18 living with them, 84.5% were married couples living together, 1.0% had a female householder with no husband present, and 8.2% were non-families. 8.2% of all households were made up of individuals, and 6.2% had someone living alone who was 65 years of age or older. The average household size was 3.22 and the average family size was 3.40.

In the township the population was spread out, with 31.7% under the age of 18, 8.0% from 18 to 24, 26.0% from 25 to 44, 23.7% from 45 to 64, and 10.6% who were 65 years of age or older. The median age was 35 years. For every 100 females, there were 109.4 males. For every 100 females age 18 and over, there were 115.2 males.

The median income for a household in the township was $41,406, and the median income for a family was $41,875. Males had a median income of $25,000 versus $18,750 for females. The per capita income for the township was $15,175. About 9.1% of families and 7.9% of the population were below the poverty line, including 9.1% of those under age 18 and 25.0% of those age 65 or over.
