= Union Township, North Dakota =

- Township
- Location within North Dakota
- Coordinates: 47°42′57″N 97°18′13″W
- Country: United States
- State: North Dakota
- County: Grand Forks

Area
  - Total: 35.95 sq mi (93.12 km^{2})
  - Land: 35.93 sq mi (93.06 km^{2})
  - Water: 0.020 sq mi (0.052 km^{2})
- Elevation: 978 ft (298 m)

Population (2020)
  - Total: 190
  - Density: 5.3/sq mi (2.0/km^{2})
- Time zone: UTC-6 (Central (CST))
  - Summer (DST): UTC-5 (CDT)
- ZIP codes: 58240 (Hatton); 58267 (Northwood); 58275 (Reynolds); 58278 (Thompson)
- Area code: 701
- FIPS code: 38-80740
- GNIS feature ID: 1036587

Union Township is a township on the southern border of Grand Forks County, North Dakota, United States. The population was 190 at the 2020 census.

== Geography ==
Union Township has a total area of 35.952 square miles (93.12 km^{2}), of which 35.932 square miles (93.06 km^{2}) is land and 0.020 square miles (0.052 km^{2}) is water.

The unincorporated community of Holmes is located in Union Township.

=== Major highways ===
- North Dakota Highway 15

== Demographics ==
As of the 2024 American Community Survey, there were an estimated 49 households with a margin of error of 19.
