= Holmes, North Dakota =

- Unincorporated community
- Location within North Dakota
- Coordinates: 47°42′57″N 97°17′48.7″W
- Country: United States
- State: North Dakota
- County: Grand Forks
- Township: Union
- Established: ca. 1872
- Elevation: 981 ft (299 m)
- Time zone: UTC-6 (Central (CST))
  - Summer (DST): UTC-5 (CDT)
- ZIP code: 58275 (Reynolds)
- Area code: 701
- GNIS feature ID: 1029501

Holmes is an unincorporated community in Union Township, Grand Forks County, North Dakota, United States.

== History ==
Holmes was established circa 1872. Etymology is uncertain, with the settlement either being named after local land surveyor David M. Holmes or Union Township's first clerk Holmes Wyman. A post office was established in 1886; it closed in 1954. The population was approximately 25 for much of its history, centered around a country store which closed in 1962.
