= West Union, Missouri =

Extinct hamlet in Missouri, U.S.

Coordinates: 38.696399°N 94.538287°W

West Union is an extinct town in Cass County, in the U.S. state of Missouri.

West Union was platted in 1872. A post office called West Union was established in 1871, and remained in operation until 1903.
