= West Union, Minnesota =

City in Minnesota, United States

- City
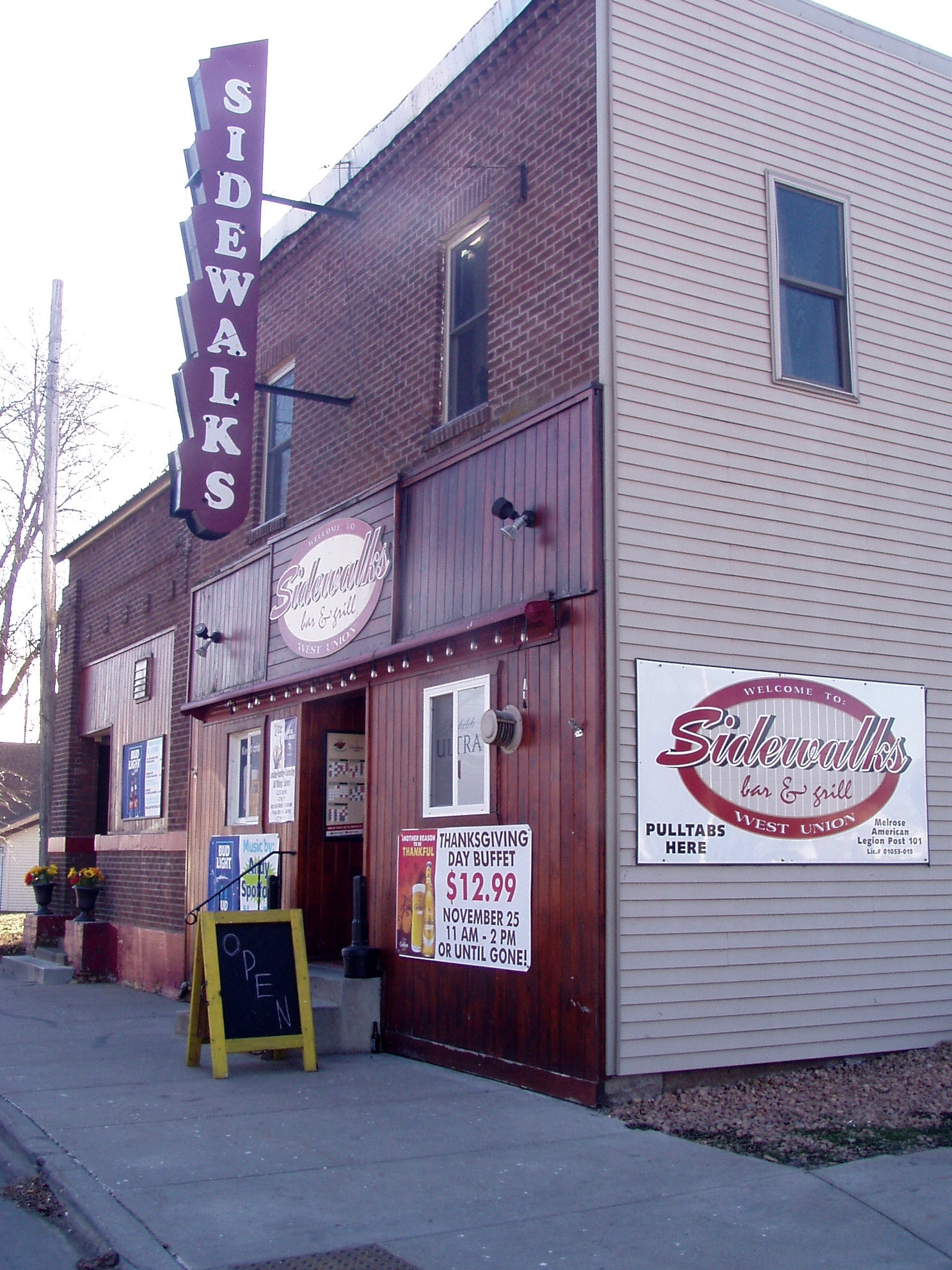
- Building in West Union

- Location of West Union, Minnesota
- Coordinates: 45°48′03″N 95°05′01″W
- Country: United States
- State: Minnesota
- County: Todd
- Organized: March 12, 1867
- Platted: June 1881
- Incorporated: 1900

Government
  - Mayor: Roger Engle

Area
  - Total: 0.479 sq mi (1.240 km^{2})
  - Land: 0.444 sq mi (1.151 km^{2})
  - Water: 0.033 sq mi (0.086 km^{2})
- Elevation: 1,335 ft (407 m)

Population (2020)
  - Total: 92
  - Estimate (2022): 92
  - Density: 207.0/sq mi (79.94/km^{2})
- Time zone: UTC−6 (Central (CST))
  - Summer (DST): UTC−5 (CDT)
- ZIP Code: 56389
- Area code: 320
- FIPS code: 27-69736
- GNIS feature ID: 2397276
- Sales tax: 7.375%

West Union is a city in Todd County, Minnesota, United States. The population was 92 at the 2020 census.

== History ==
West Union was platted in 1881 and incorporated in 1900. The West Union post office closed in 1996. It had been open since 1860. The village had a Great Northern Railway station in section 21 of West Union township.

== Geography ==
According to the United States Census Bureau, the city has a total area of 0.444 square miles (1.15 km^{2}), all land. West Union Lake borders the western boundary of the village.

Interstate 94/U.S. Highway 52 serves as the main route to the community.

== Demographics ==
Historical population
Census	Pop.	Note	%±
1910	161		—
1920	169		5.0%
1930	132		−21.9%
1940	78		−40.9%
1950	100		28.2%
1960	83		−17.0%
1970	71		−14.5%
1980	74		4.2%
1990	54		−27.0%
2000	87		61.1%
2010	111		27.6%
2020	92		−17.1%
2022 (est.)	92		0.0%
U.S. Decennial Census; 2020 Census

=== 2010 census ===
As of the 2010 census, there were 111 people, 42 households, and 31 families living in the city. The population density was 264.3 inhabitants per square mile (102.0/km^{2}). There were 43 housing units at an average density of 102.4 per square mile (39.5/km^{2}). The racial makeup of the city was 99.1% White and 0.9% from two or more races.

There were 42 households, of which 35.7% had children under the age of 18 living with them, 54.8% were married couples living together, 9.5% had a female householder with no husband present, 9.5% had a male householder with no wife present, and 26.2% were non-families. 23.8% of all households were made up of individuals, and 4.8% had someone living alone who was 65 years of age or older. The average household size was 2.64 and the average family size was 3.10.

The median age in the city was 35.8 years. 24.3% of residents were under the age of 18; 12.6% were between the ages of 18 and 24; 20.7% were from 25 to 44; 33.3% were from 45 to 64; and 9% were 65 years of age or older. The gender makeup of the city was 51.4% male and 48.6% female.

=== 2000 census ===
As of the 2000 census, there were 87 people, 31 households, and 19 families living in the city. The population density was 252.8 inhabitants per square mile (97.6/km^{2}). There were 32 housing units at an average density of 93.0 per square mile (35.9/km^{2}). The racial makeup of the city was 100.00% White.

There were 31 households, out of which 41.9% had children under the age of 18 living with them, 51.6% were married couples living together, 3.2% had a female householder with no husband present, and 35.5% were non-families. 32.3% of all households were made up of individuals, and 6.5% had someone living alone who was 65 years of age or older. The average household size was 2.81 and the average family size was 3.70.

In the city, the population was spread out, with 40.2% under the age of 18, 3.4% from 18 to 24, 31.0% from 25 to 44, 9.2% from 45 to 64, and 16.1% who were 65 years of age or older. The median age was 32 years. For every 100 females, there were 112.2 males. For every 100 females age 18 and over, there were 116.7 males.

The median income for a household in the city was $24,643, and the median income for a family was $39,375. Males had a median income of $24,167 versus $19,375 for females. The per capita income for the city was $10,441. There were 15.8% of families and 23.1% of the population living below the poverty line, including 36.4% of under eighteens and 15.0% of those over 64.
