= West Union Township =

West Union Township may refer to one of the following places in the United States:

- West Union Township, Todd County, Minnesota
- West Union Township, Custer County, Nebraska

See also

- West Township (disambiguation)
