= West Union, Pocahontas County, West Virginia =

West Union, West Virginia
- Unincorporated community
- Location within West Virginia Location within the United States
- Coordinates: 38°16′10″N 80°08′24″W
- Country: United States
- State: West Virginia
- County: Pocahontas
- Elevation: 2,608 ft (795 m)
- Time zone: UTC-5 (Eastern (EST))
  - Summer (DST): UTC-4 (EDT)
- Area codes: 304 & 681
- GNIS feature ID: 1728196

West Union is an unincorporated community in Pocahontas County, West Virginia, United States. West Union is 4 miles (6.4 km) northwest of Marlinton.
