= North Union Township, Pennsylvania =

North Union Township is the name of some places in the U.S. state of Pennsylvania:

- North Union Township, Fayette County, Pennsylvania
- North Union Township, Schuylkill County, Pennsylvania

== See also ==
- East Union Township, Pennsylvania
- South Union Township, Pennsylvania
- Union Township, Pennsylvania (disambiguation)
