= Belleville, Pennsylvania =

Unincorporated community in Pennsylvania, US

Belleville
- CDP
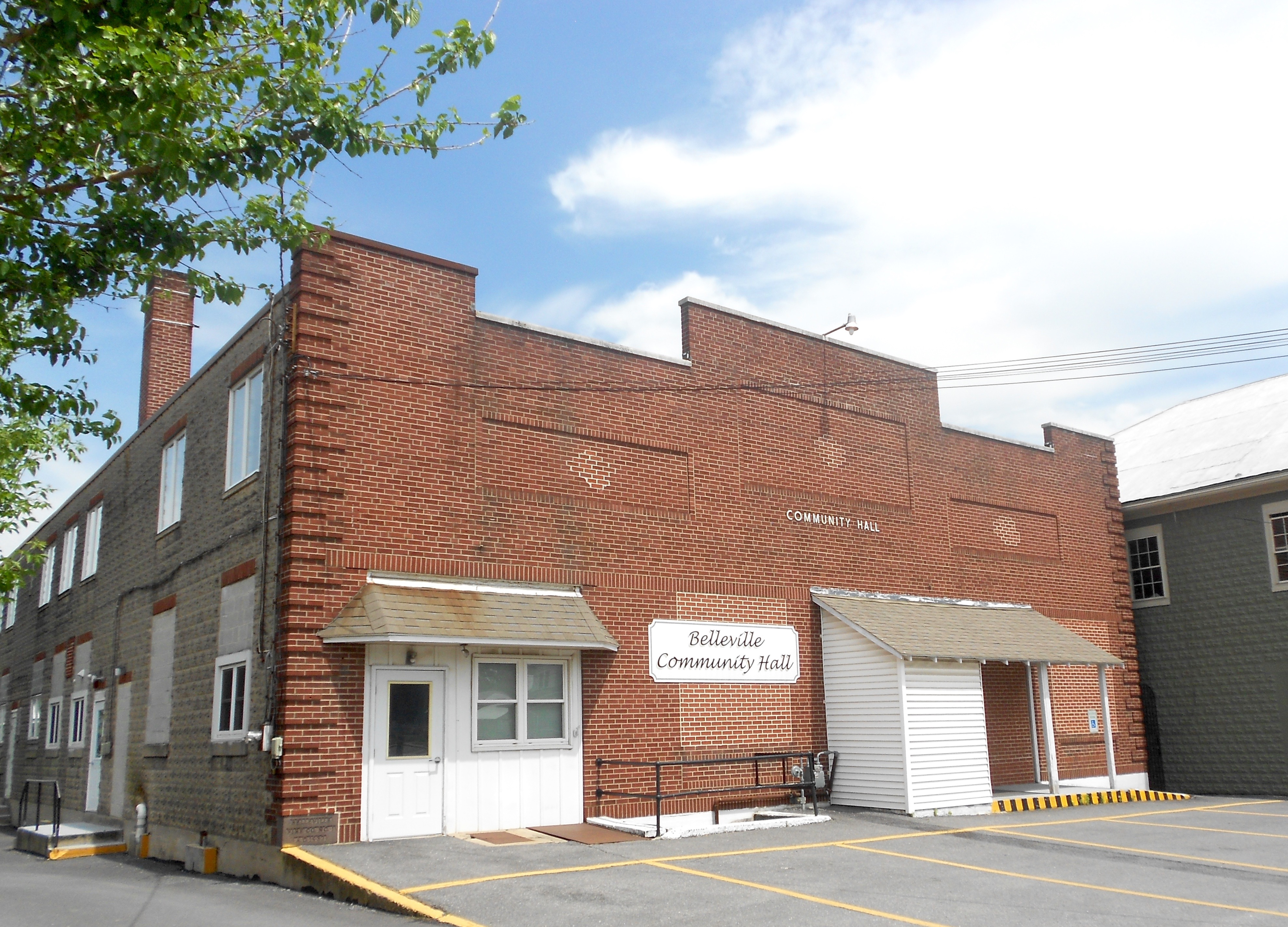
- Community Center

- Location within the U.S. state of Pennsylvania Belleville (the United States)
- Coordinates: 40°36′12″N 77°43′29″W
- Country: United States
- State: Pennsylvania
- County: Mifflin

Area
  - Total: 2.00 sq mi (5.17 km^{2})
  - Land: 2.00 sq mi (5.17 km^{2})
  - Water: 0 sq mi (0.00 km^{2})

Population (2020)
  - Total: 1,947
  - Density: 975.6/sq mi (376.67/km^{2})
- Time zone: UTC-5 (Eastern (EST))
  - Summer (DST): UTC-4 (EDT)
- ZIP codes: 17004
- Area code: 717
- GNIS feature ID: 42-05304

Belleville is a census-designated place (CDP) in the Kishacoquillas Valley of Mifflin County, Pennsylvania, United States. As of the 2020 census, Belleville had a population of 1,947. Much of the population is Amish or Mennonite.

== History ==
Amish settled in the area by 1791. Mennonites arrived soon after and the two groups dominate the area's population. Though some Amish churches in the area allow members to drive motorized vehicles, most local Amish drive horse-powered buggies. The color of the buggy tops, yellow, white, or black, indicate the owner's church membership.

The auction in Belleville is a popular destination every Wednesday. Locally grown produce, homemade baked goods, and farm-raised animals are available. A flea market is held at the same time.

Children attend schools in the Mifflin County School District.

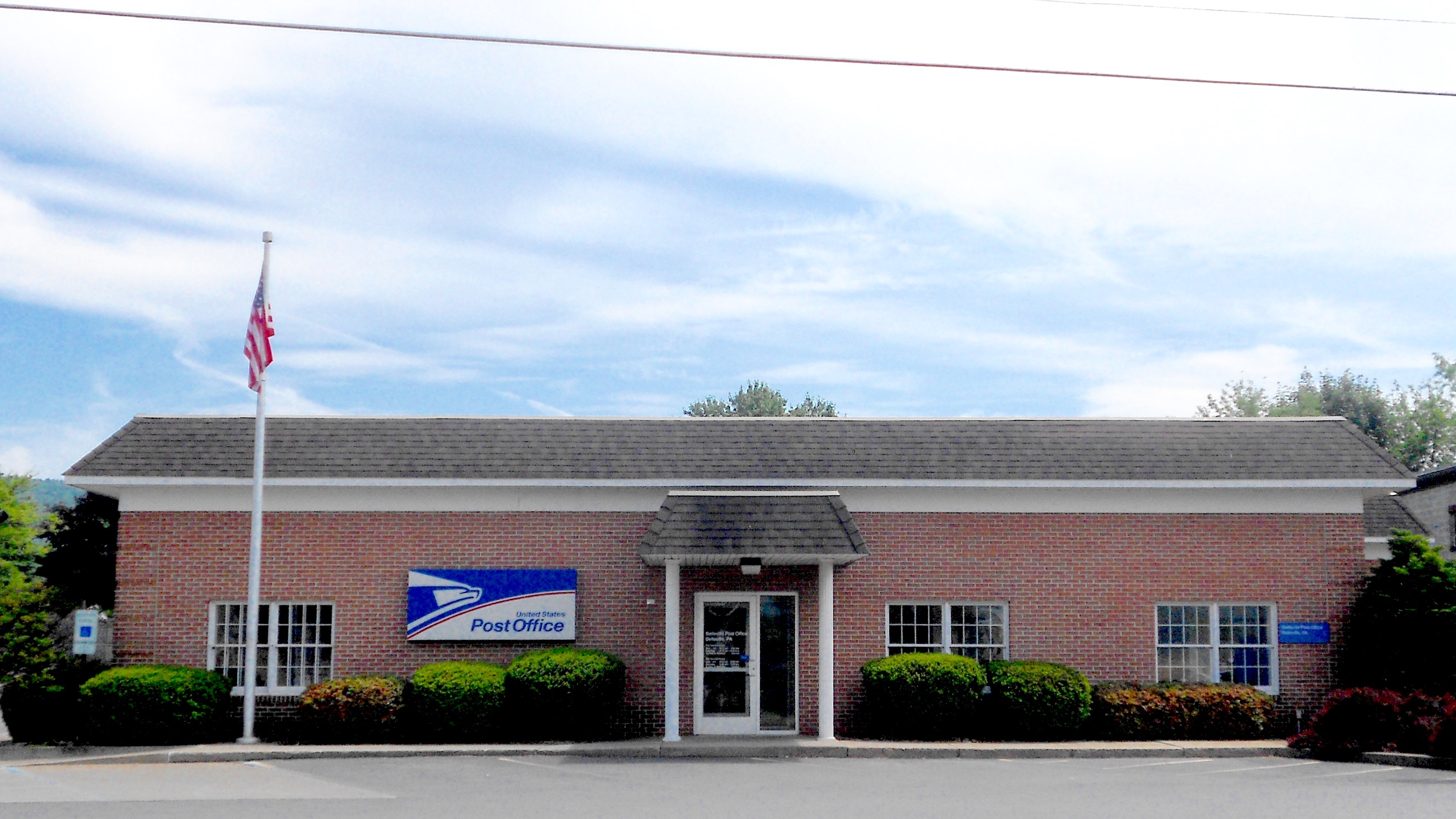
Post Office, ZIP code 17004

Belleville is the place where World champion Horseshoe pitcher Darle Esh was born. He was classed in the top 3% in the world.

== Geography ==
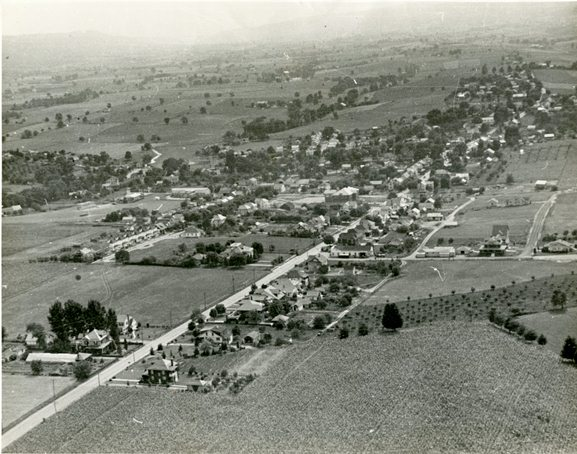
1939 aerial view

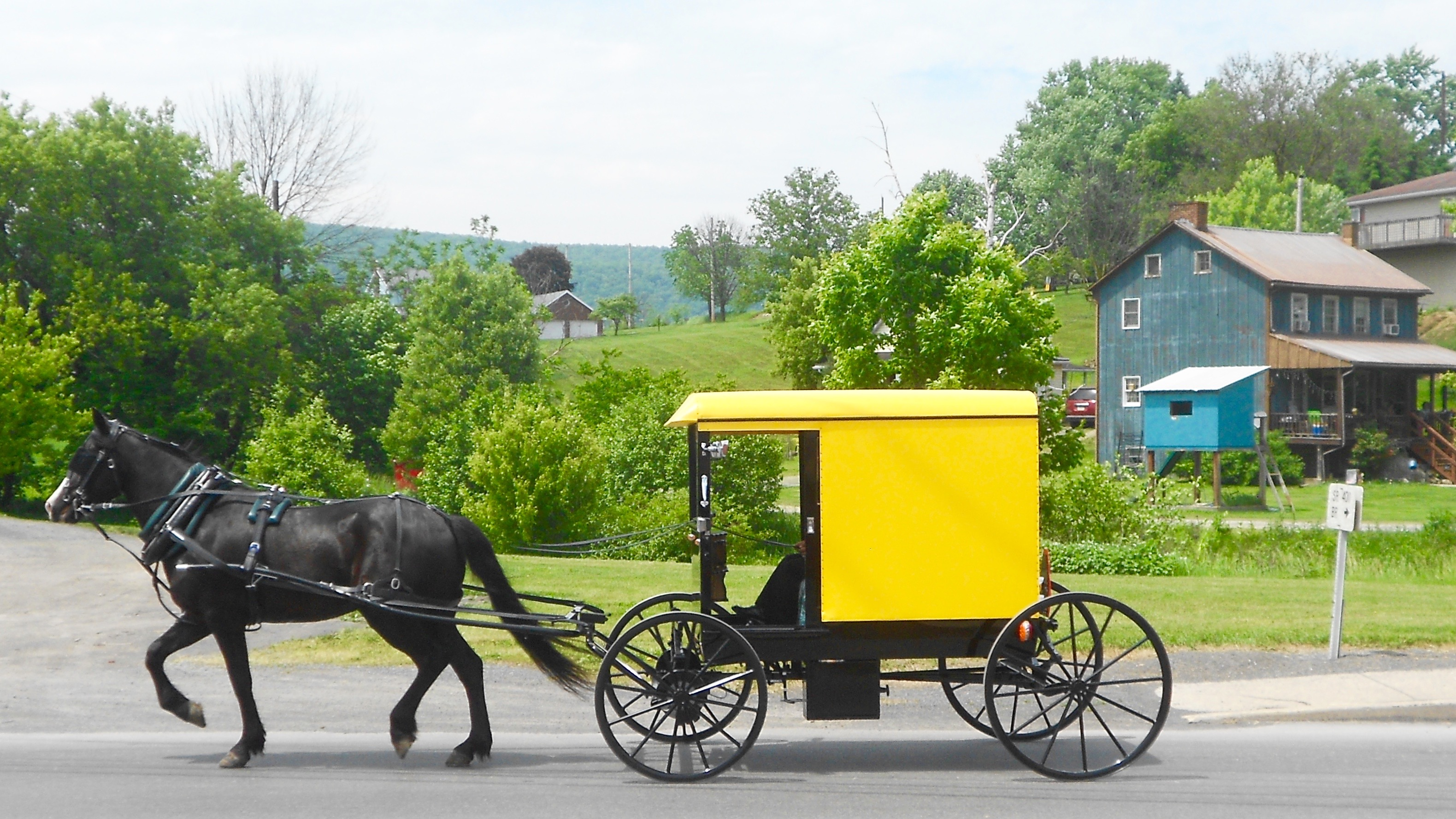
Yellow topped buggy of the Byler Amish in Belleville

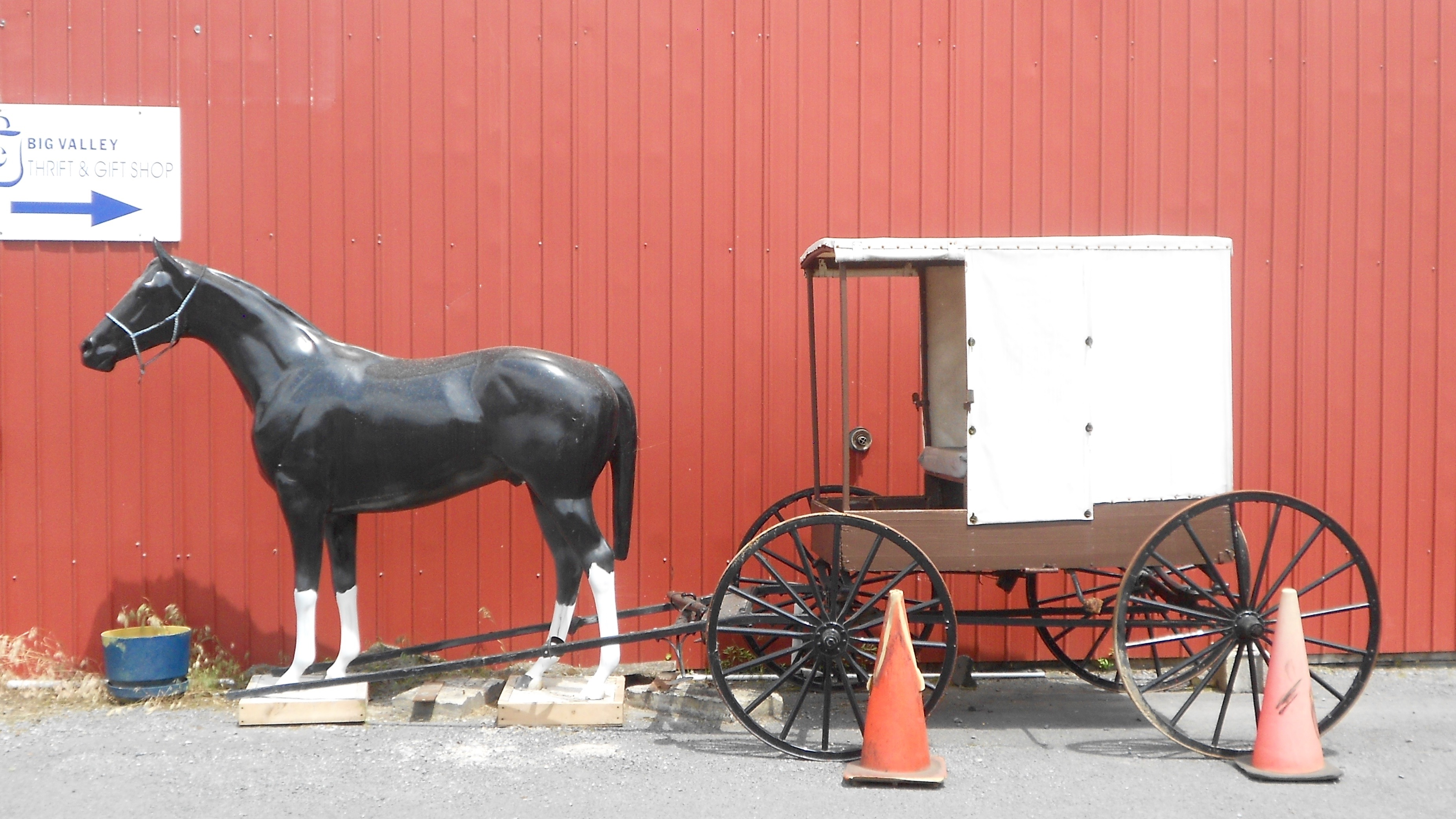
White topped buggy of the Nebraska Amish with a model horse on Main Street

Belleville is located at 40°36′12″N 77°43′29″W (40.603376, -77.724822) in Union Township. Pennsylvania Route 655 is known as Main Street within the village, with residences and a few businesses spread out within about two blocks of Main Street.

According to the United States Census Bureau, the CDP has a total area of 2.1 square miles (5.4 km^{2}), all land.

== Demographics ==
Historical population
Census	Pop.	Note	%±
2020	1,947		—
U.S. Decennial Census

As of the census of 2000, there were 1,386 people, 572 households, and 407 families residing in the CDP. The population density was 667.4 inhabitants per square mile (257.7/km^{2}). There were 589 housing units at an average density of 283.6 per square mile (109.5/km^{2}). The racial makeup of the CDP was 99.64% White, 0.07% African American, 0.07% Native American, 0.14% Asian, and 0.07% from two or more races. Hispanic or Latino of any race were 0.36% of the population.

There were 572 households, out of which 27.1% had children under the age of 18 living with them, 62.2% were married couples living together, 6.3% had a female householder with no husband present, and 28.7% were non-families. 26.9% of all households were made up of individuals, and 14.0% had someone living alone who was 65 years of age or older. The average household size was 2.42 and the average family size was 2.93.

In the CDP, the population was spread out, with 24.3% under the age of 18, 5.6% from 18 to 24, 24.9% from 25 to 44, 25.0% from 45 to 64, and 20.2% who were 65 years of age or older. The median age was 42 years. For every 100 females, there were 90.1 males. For every 100 females age 18 and over, there were 86.3 males.

The median income for a household in the CDP was $34,352, and the median income for a family was $40,096. Males had a median income of $32,933 versus $21,490 for females. The per capita income for the CDP was $15,202. About 2.0% of families and 6.1% of the population were below the poverty line, including 5.2% of those under age 18 and 9.1% of those age 65 or over.

== See also ==
- Belleville Mennonite School
