= Union Township, Mifflin County, Pennsylvania =

Township in Pennsylvania, US

Coordinates: 40°37′36″N 77°45′29″W

- Township
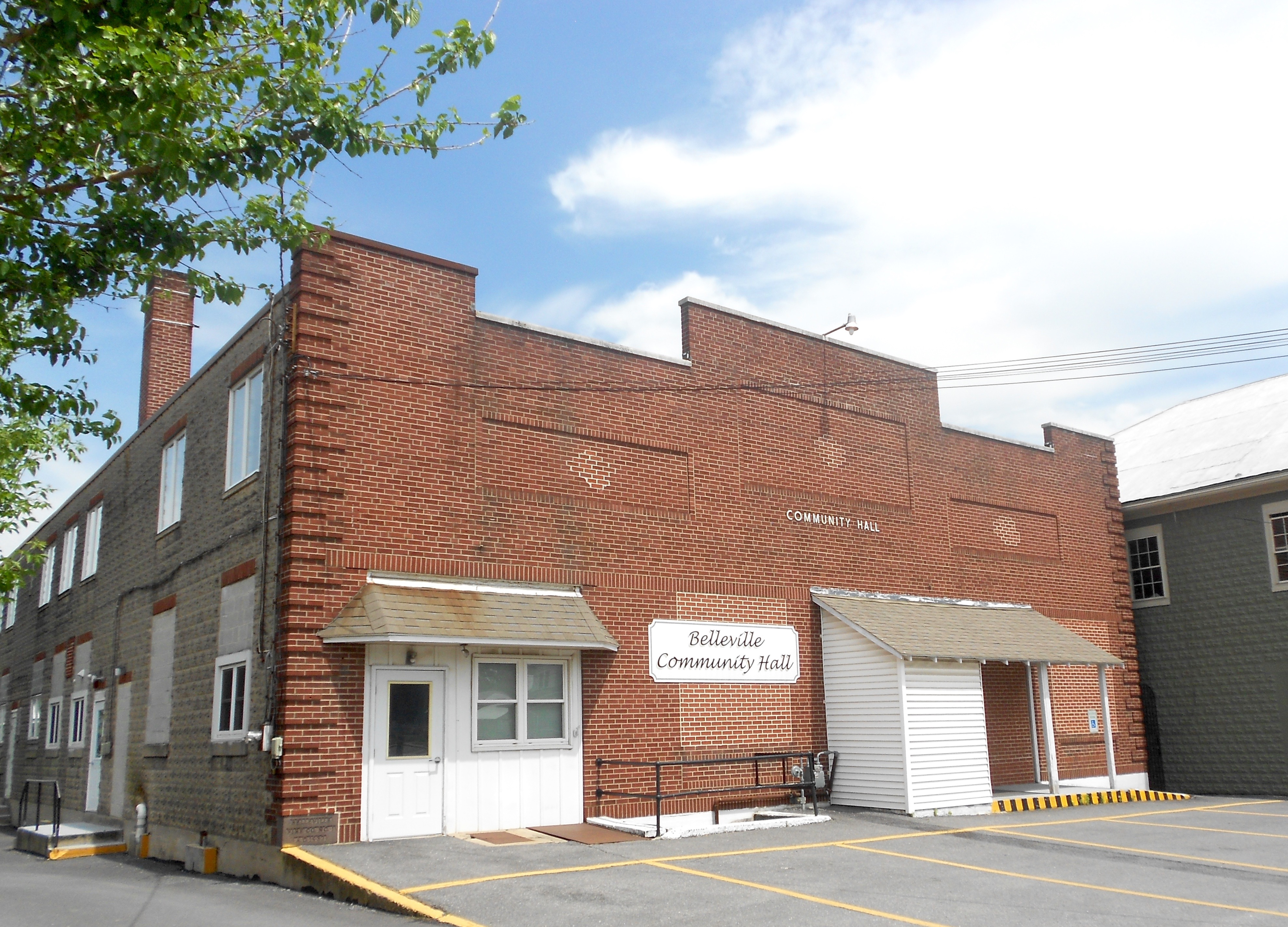
- Community Center in Belleville

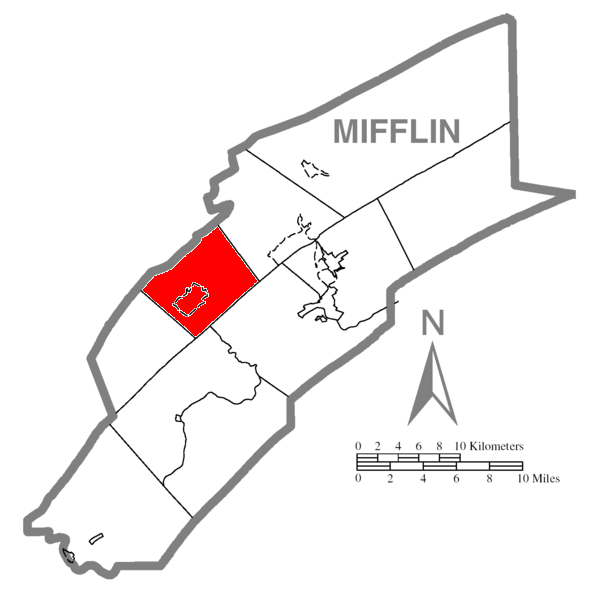
- Map of Mifflin County, Pennsylvania highlighting Union Township

- Map of Mifflin County, Pennsylvania
- Country: United States
- State: Pennsylvania
- County: Mifflin
- Settled: 1754
- Incorporated: 1790

Government
  - Type: Board of Supervisors
  - Chairman: Brian Glick
  - Vice Chairman: Keith Mernin
  - Supervisor: James Treaster, Jr.

Area
  - Total: 25.50 sq mi (66.05 km^{2})
  - Land: 25.46 sq mi (65.95 km^{2})
  - Water: 0.039 sq mi (0.10 km^{2})

Population (2020)
  - Total: 3,655 ▼
  - Estimate (2022): 3,686
  - Density: 136.2/sq mi (52.57/km^{2})
- Time zone: UTC-5 (Eastern (EST))
  - Summer (DST): UTC-4 (EDT)
- Zip code: 17004
- Area code: 717
- FIPS code: 42-087-78392
- Local phone exchange: 935

Union Township is a township in Mifflin County, Pennsylvania, United States. The population was 3,655 at the time of the 2020 census.

== Geography ==
According to the United States Census Bureau, the township has a total area of 25.5 square miles (66.1 km^{2}), all of it land. It contains the census-designated place of Belleville.

== Demographics ==
Historical population
Census	Pop.	Note	%±
2010	3,460		—
2020	3,655		5.6%
2022 (est.)	3,686		0.8%
U.S. Decennial Census

As of the census of 2000, there were 3,313 people, 1,163 households, and 860 families residing in the township.

The population density was 129.8 inhabitants per square mile (50.1/km^{2}). There were 1,242 housing units at an average density of 48.7 per square mile (18.8/km^{2}).

The racial makeup of the township was 99.28% White, 0.21% African American, 0.06% Native American, 0.09% Asian, 0.15% from other races, and 0.21% from two or more races. Hispanic or Latino of any race were 0.30% of the population.

There were 1,163 households, out of which 30.6% had children under the age of eighteen living with them; 66.3% were married couples living together, 5.7% had a female householder with no husband present, and 26.0% were non-families. 24.5% of all households were made up of individuals, and 15.3% had someone living alone who was sixty-five years of age or older.

The average household size was 2.71 and the average family size was 3.25.

In the township the population was spread out, with 27.8% under the age of eighteen, 6.4% from eighteen to twenty-four, 22.8% from twenty-five to forty-four, 19.6% from forty-five to sixty-four, and 23.3% who were sixty-five years of age or older. The median age was forty years.

For every one hundred females, there were 84.8 males. For every one hundred females who were aged eighteen or older, there were 80.1 males.

The median income for a household in the township was $32,530, and the median income for a family was $40,000. Males had a median income of $30,965 compared with that of $20,441 for females.

The per capita income for the township was $14,185.

Roughly 6.2% of families and 10.5% of the population were living below the poverty line, including 13.0% of those who were under the age of eighteen and 14.2% of those who were aged sixty-five or older.
