= National Register of Historic Places listings in Brown County, Minnesota =

Location of Brown County in Minnesota

This is a list of the National Register of Historic Places listings in Brown County, Minnesota. It is intended to be a complete list of the properties and districts on the National Register of Historic Places in Brown County, Minnesota, United States. The locations of National Register properties and districts for which the latitude and longitude coordinates are included below, may be seen in an online map.

There are 39 properties and districts listed on the National Register in the county. A supplementary list includes six additional sites that were formerly listed on the National Register.

This National Park Service list is complete through NPS recent listings posted August 7, 2026.

== Current listings ==
	Name on the Register	Image	Date listed	Location	City or town	Description
1	Bendixon-Schmid House	Bendixon-Schmid House	December 31, 1979 (#79001218)	123 N. Marshall St. 44°14′27″N 94°58′32″W	Springfield	1894 Queen Anne house representative of Springfield's enclave of large, professional-class homes, owned successively by two notable figures in the city's development as an early commercial center.
2	C. Berg's Hotel	C. Berg's Hotel	February 6, 2012 (#11001084)	145 W. Main St. 44°17′49″N 94°43′27″W	Sleepy Eye	1899 hotel whose first-class accommodations, dining room, and display space for traveling salesmen were a key amenity in a regional milling and commerce center.
3	Bjorneberg Garage	Bjorneberg Garage	December 31, 1979 (#79001197)	Broadway St. 44°08′52″N 94°29′38″W	Hanska	Otherwise typical representative of the first automobile service stations—built c. 1919—made distinctive by its concrete bas-reliefs of motoring scenes.
4	Boesch, Hummel, and Maltzahn Block	Boesch, Hummel, and Maltzahn Block	December 31, 1979 (#79001201)	6-12 N. Minnesota St. 44°18′49″N 94°27′33″W	New Ulm	Most elaborate intact example—built in 1890—of the Main Street commercial blocks constructed in area towns around the turn of the 20th century. Also a contributing property to the New Ulm Commercial Historic District.
5	Chicago and North Western Depot	Chicago and North Western Depot	June 25, 1992 (#92000822)	Oak St., NW. 44°17′54″N 94°43′25″W	Sleepy Eye	Large 1902 railway station, a major component of Sleepy Eye's transportation infrastructure in the first half of the 20th century when the city was a key railroad center in Southern Minnesota.
6	Chicago and North Western Railroad Depot	Chicago and North Western Railroad Depot	December 31, 1979 (#79001202)	S. Valley St. 44°18′47″N 94°27′13″W	New Ulm	Circa-1895 railway station attesting to the late-19th-century rail network that made New Ulm an important junction between the agricultural hinterland and urban markets.
7	District No. 50 School	District No. 50 School	January 24, 2017 (#100000564)	20837 U.S. 14; 44°19′33″N 94°35′24″W	Milford Township	Unusually intact 1912 one-room school built on a state-issued architectural plan. Also noted for representing efforts to provide nearby, locally-controlled education for rural Minnesota youth. Now the Milford Town Hall.
8	Bernard Fesenmaier House	Bernard Fesenmaier House	December 31, 1979 (#79001203)	426 N. State St. 44°19′01″N 94°27′58″W	New Ulm	One of the most intact examples of New Ulm's late-19th-century German-style houses, built c. 1888 with polychrome brick.
9	Flandrau State Park CCC/WPA/Rustic Style Historic Resources	Flandrau State Park CCC/WPA/Rustic Style Historic Resources	October 25, 1989 (#89001658)	Off County Highway 13 southeast of New Ulm; 44°17′32″N 94°28′13″W	New Ulm	Park facilities with 24 contributing properties built 1934–42 with Germanic architectural elements, significant as examples of New Deal federal work relief, early Minnesota state park development, and National Park Service rustic design that uniquely harmonizes with local cultural context.
10	Wanda Gág Childhood Home	Wanda Gág Childhood Home	December 31, 1979 (#79001204)	226 N. Washington St. 44°18′51″N 94°27′56″W	New Ulm	Home from birth to age 20 of artist and author Wanda Gág (1893–1946), whose 1928 children's book Millions of Cats helped establish the picture book format. Now a museum.
11	Grand Hotel	Grand Hotel	June 21, 1990 (#90000986)	210 N. Minnesota St. 44°18′57″N 94°27′40″W	New Ulm	1876 Italianate hotel expanded in 1899, a key amenity in New Ulm's economic development and its finest example of commercial Victorian architecture. Also a contributing property to the New Ulm Commercial Historic District.
12	Hermann Monument	Hermann Monument	October 2, 1973 (#73000965)	Hermann Heights Park; 44°18′26″N 94°28′22″W	New Ulm	Landmark 120-foot (37 m) monument built 1887–89 by the Sons of Hermann society to honor the nation's German American heritage.
13	Frederick W. Kiesling House	Frederick W. Kiesling House	February 23, 1972 (#72000674)	220 N. Minnesota St. 44°18′58″N 94°27′40″W	New Ulm	One of New Ulm's few remaining early houses—built in 1861—and a rare survivor of the Battles of New Ulm during the Dakota War of 1862. Also a contributing property to the New Ulm Commercial Historic District.
14	Kreitinger Garage	Kreitinger Garage	December 31, 1979 (#79001219)	1 N. Cass St. 44°14′21″N 94°58′27″W	Springfield	Circa-1911 car dealership with ornamental brickwork, a striking remnant of the early years of automobile use in Brown County.
15	Lampert Lumber Company Line Yard	Lampert Lumber Company Line Yard	December 31, 1979 (#79001196)	Center St. 44°19′30″N 94°36′19″W	Essig	Nominated as an extremely rare intact example of a small-town lumber store, built in 1919. Demolished except for an outlying shed.
16	Liberal Union Hall	Liberal Union Hall	December 31, 1979 (#79001198)	Broadway and Main Sts. 44°08′56″N 94°29′38″W	Hanska	1910 community center founded by the Unitarian separatists of the Nora Free Christian Church; noted as a long-serving local event venue and a symbol of a regionally unique religious group.
17	Gov. John Lind House	Gov. John Lind House	December 31, 1974 (#74001005)	622 Center St. 44°18′45″N 94°27′43″W	New Ulm	1887 Queen Anne house of populist politician John Lind (1854–1930), four-term congressman and 14th governor of Minnesota.
18	Melges Bakery	Melges Bakery	June 28, 1974 (#74001006)	213 S. Minnesota St. 44°18′39″N 94°27′23″W	New Ulm	One of New Ulm's few intact 19th-century commercial buildings, an 1865 butcher shop converted and expanded into a bakery in 1871.
19	New Ulm Armory	New Ulm Armory	December 31, 1979 (#79001205)	205 N. Broadway St. 44°18′53″N 94°27′47″W	New Ulm	1914 armory, leading example of the fortresslike style used in Minnesota before World War I, and home of one of the state's oldest National Guard companies, originating in 1871.
20	New Ulm Commercial Historic District	New Ulm Commercial Historic District	December 21, 2005 (#05001438)	Roughly bounded by Minnesota St. between 1st St., S. and 3rd St., N. 44°18′51″N 94°27′36″W	New Ulm	Four-block downtown district important in the economic development of south-central Minnesota, with 63 contributing properties—including retail, bank, and service buildings, plus theatres, meeting halls, and government offices—mostly built between the 1880s and 1948.
21	New Ulm High School	New Ulm High School	July 21, 2015 (#15000438)	1 N. State St. 44°18′44″N 94°27′46″W	New Ulm	1915 school expanded in 1939 and 1956, reflecting the transformation of public high school education from the Progressive Era of the original section to the federal work relief of the 1930s and the Post–World War II baby boom. Later used as the New Ulm Junior High School.
22	New Ulm Oil Company Service Station	New Ulm Oil Company Service Station	December 31, 1979 (#79001206)	Broadway and Fifth Streets; 44°19′04″N 94°27′54″W	New Ulm	Fanciful 1926 gas station flanked by two towers, a rare surviving example of the eyecatching custom designs built throughout southern Minnesota by a local company as automobile use expanded in the 1920s.
23	New Ulm Post Office	New Ulm Post Office	April 28, 1970 (#70000287)	2 N. Broadway; 44°18′47″N 94°27′37″W	New Ulm	Striking 1909 Renaissance Revival post office designed to reflect the heritage of New Ulm's original Germanic settlers. Also a contributing property to the New Ulm Commercial Historic District. Now houses the Brown County Historical Society.
24	Nora Free Christian Church	Nora Free Christian Church	August 4, 1988 (#88001176)	Minnesota Highway 257; 44°08′36″N 94°28′53″W	Hanska	1883 church, 1906 parsonage, and cemetery associated with Norwegian intellectual Kristofer Janson (1841–1917) and his protégé Amandus Norman, who founded a liberal Unitarian minority among the state's conservative Lutheran Norwegian immigrants.
25	Adolph C. Ochs House	Adolph C. Ochs House	December 31, 1979 (#79001220)	303 N. Marshall St. 44°14′32″N 94°58′33″W	Springfield	1911 Colonial Revival house of the founder of the A.C. Ochs Brick and Tile Company, a major local industry.
26	Old Main, Dr. Martin Luther College	Old Main, Dr. Martin Luther College	December 31, 1979 (#79001208)	College Heights, Martin Luther College campus 44°18′21″N 94°28′16″W	New Ulm	1884 original building of a Lutheran college; a leading example of Gothic Revival architecture in Minnesota and a distinctive symbol of local religious education.
27	August Schell Brewing Company	August Schell Brewing Company	December 27, 1974 (#74001007)	20th South St. 44°17′21″N 94°26′59″W	New Ulm	Only surviving example of New Ulm's seven early breweries—established in 1860—with highly intact industrial buildings, residences, and gardens.
28	Otto Schell House	Otto Schell House	December 31, 1979 (#79001210)	Point Lookout; 44°17′29″N 94°26′50″W	New Ulm	Circa-1895 house of the second-generation manager of the August Schell Brewing Company, significant for its well-preserved Queen Anne architecture and association with an important local business.
29	Shady Lane Stock Farm	Shady Lane Stock Farm	December 31, 1979 (#79001221)	U.S. Route 14; 44°15′04″N 94°56′48″W	Springfield	Farm with four structures built 1898–1913, significant for its regional influence in progressive farming (especially stock breeding), owner LaForest E. Potter's extensive agricultural association activity, and its prototype of the brick "A.C.O." silos erected throughout the Midwest.
30	Sleepy Eye Milling Company	Sleepy Eye Milling Company	February 8, 1991 (#91000038)	Junction of 4th and Oak Sts., NE. 44°17′55″N 94°43′06″W	Sleepy Eye	Flour milling complex with 20 contributing properties built 1901–1921, southern Minnesota's most complete example of an important agricultural processing industry.
31	W. W. Smith House	W. W. Smith House	December 31, 1979 (#79001211)	101 Linden St., SW. 44°17′34″N 94°43′24″W	Sleepy Eye	Circa-1901 house, Sleepy Eye's best-preserved example of the large residences erected by its professional class at the turn of the 20th century. Now a bed and breakfast.
32	South Broadway Historic District	South Broadway Historic District	December 31, 1979 (#79001212)	200–308 S. Broadway; 44°18′39″N 94°27′33″W	New Ulm	Locally distinctive row of eight brick houses constructed 1895–1906, and associated with a cross-section of New Ulm's professional class at the turn of the 20th century.
33	South German Street Historic District	South German Street Historic District	December 31, 1979 (#79001217)	110–312 S. German St. 44°18′43″N 94°27′21″W	New Ulm	Eight houses mostly built 1884–1899, significant as Southwest Minnesota's best collection of large, late-19th-century residences and for their association with the era's business leaders in New Ulm.
34	St. Michael's School and Convent	St. Michael's School and Convent	December 31, 1979 (#79001213)	500 N. State St. 44°19′02″N 94°27′59″W	New Ulm	1872 Italianate parochial building with a slightly later Second Empire height addition and 1898 Gothic Revival chapel, a rare example of early institutional architecture in Brown County.
35	Synsteby Site	Synsteby Site	May 12, 1975 (#75000976)	Address restricted 44°06′59″N 94°32′53″W	Hanska	Archaeological site unique in Minnesota for exhibiting four distinct cultural components: two separate Woodland period occupations, a Mississippian culture phase, and an 1863 Euro-American fort. Now preserved within Lake Hanska County Park.
36	Thormodson Barn	Thormodson Barn	December 31, 1979 (#79001199)	Off Minnesota Highway 257; 44°07′50″N 94°26′27″W	Hanska	1912 hexadecagonal barn, Brown County's only known example of the round barn fad and one of the few in southwestern Minnesota.
37	Turner Hall	Turner Hall	December 31, 1979 (#79001215)	102 S. State St. 44°18′37″N 94°27′39″W	New Ulm	1873 gymnasium and meeting hall of the Turners group that helped settle New Ulm in 1856; a symbol of the city's founding, its German-American heritage, and this once-common immigrant organization.
38	The Way of the Cross	The Way of the Cross	November 2, 2020 (#100004756)	1500 5th St. N. 44°18′44″N 94°28′39″W	New Ulm	One of the nation's first Stations of the Cross, with 18 contributing properties built 1903–04. Associated with the rising influence of Catholics among New Ulm's German Americans under the leadership of Reverend Alexander Berghold (1838–1918).
39	Winona and St. Peter Freight Depot	Winona and St. Peter Freight Depot	December 31, 1979 (#79001216)	Oak St., NE. 44°17′55″N 94°43′17″W	Sleepy Eye	Circa-1887 Winona and St. Peter Railroad depot, oldest surviving building associated with the transformative first years of rail access in Brown County.

== Former listings ==
	Name on the Register	Image	Date listed	Date removed	Location	City or town	Description
1	Chicago and North Western Section House	Chicago and North Western Section House	December 31, 1979 (#79001195)	March 28, 1990	Railroad and Brown Sts. (original address); Current coordinates are 44°04′29″N 95°39′54″W	Comfrey	c. 1899 section house, nominated as Brown County's last remaining structure associated with its later granger rail lines. Moved to End-O-Line Railroad Park in Currie, Minnesota in 1988.
2	Cobden Jail	Cobden Jail	December 31, 1979 (#79001194)	August 8, 1991	2nd Street; 44°17′11″N 94°51′01″W	Cobden	Built c. 1900. Significantly altered in 1989.
3	New Ulm Roller Mill Complex	New Ulm Roller Mill Complex	December 31, 1979 (#79001207)	June 25, 1986	222 1st South St.	New Ulm	Flour mill complex dating to 1910. Burned down in the early 1980s.
4	Ruemke Mercantile Store		December 31, 1979 (#79001209)	May 4, 1984	226 N. Minnesota	New Ulm	1895 Queen Anne commercial building. Demolished in 1981.
5	Tivoli Gardens		December 31, 1979 (#79001214)	May 15, 1987	313 1st North St.	New Ulm	1885 restaurant. Demolished in 1985.
6	Twente Farm Elevator and Granary		December 31, 1979 (#79001200)	September 25, 1987	off Co. Rd. 16	Albin Township	1885 agricultural buildings. Demolished in 1986.

== See also ==
- List of National Historic Landmarks in Minnesota
- National Register of Historic Places listings in Minnesota
