= Brown County Courthouse (Minnesota) =

United States historic place

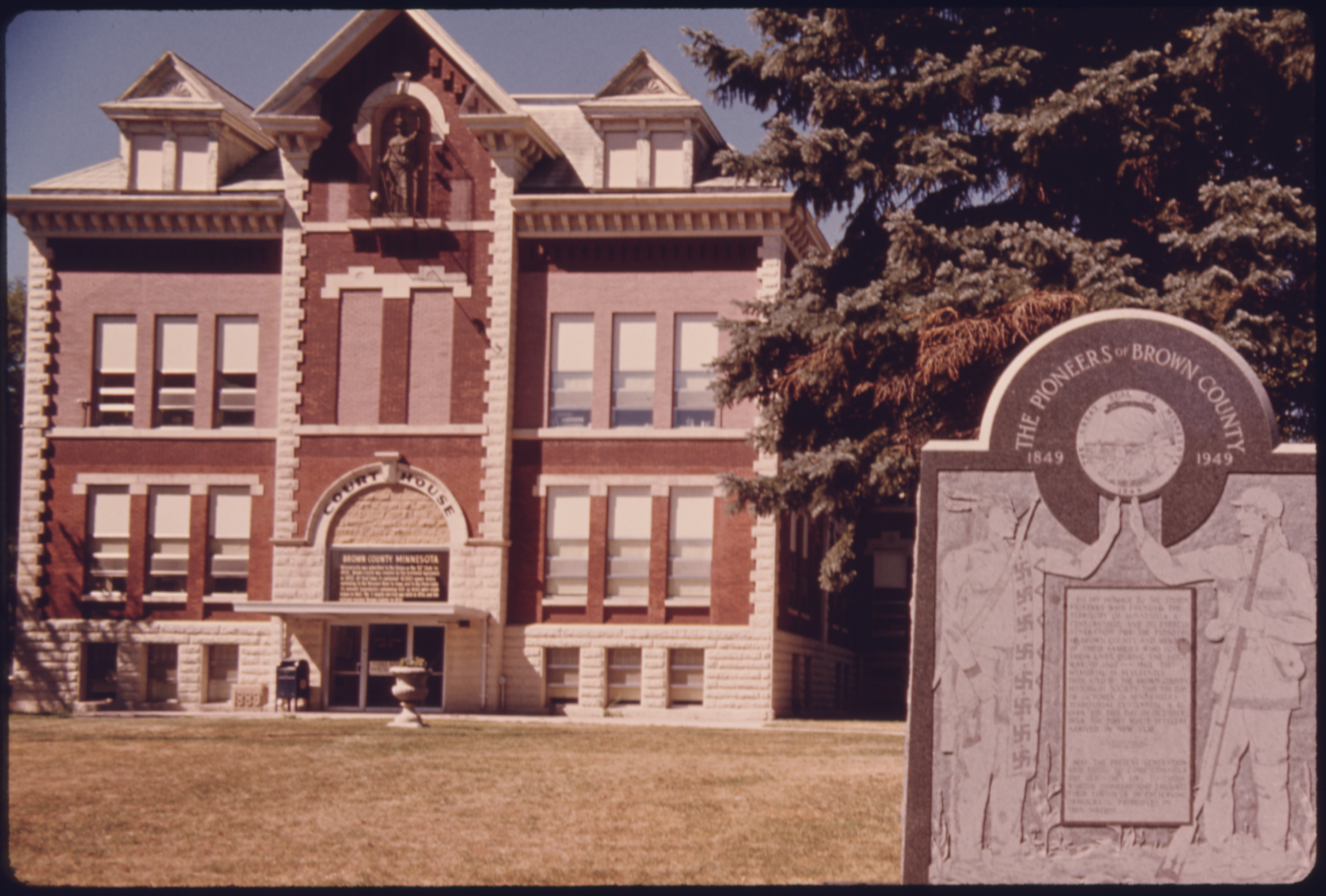
- Brown County Courthouse c. 1974 by Flip Schulke
- Interactive map of the Brown County Courthouse area

General information
- Architectural style: Renaissance Revival
- Location: 14 South State Street; New Ulm, Minnesota 56073
- Coordinates: 44.311°N 94.462°W
- Construction started: 1889
- Completed: 1891
- Renovated: 1918; 1930
- Cost: $35,000 (1889)

Technical details
- Floor count: 2

Design and construction
- Architects: Carl Struck and Henry Hanschen
- Main contractor: Adolph Casimir Ochs; Schapekahn Brothers Construction Company

Renovating team
- Architects: Herman Koop & Sons; Puhlman Brothers

The Brown County Courthouse is a courthouse in New Ulm, Minnesota, United States, the county seat of Brown County, Minnesota. It was constructed from 1889 to 1891 and currently serves as the county's courthouse.

== History ==
Previous to the construction of a formal courthouse the local Turner hall in New Ulm served as an impromptu courtroom with an adjacent jail. Brown County's first courthouse was formally constructed by Julius Berndt in 1865 at the cost of $2,964, the 1865 courthouse was eventually razed in 1889. Berndt later designed the famous Hermann Heights Monument in New Ulm. In 1873 a new brick courthouse was constructed for $10,000 by Anton Zieher and Jenry Spoerhase, the 1873 courthouse was demolished in 1904.

The current courthouse was designed by architects Carl F. Struck of Minneapolis and Henry Hanschen. The courthouse was built by Adolph Casimir Ochs (A.C. Ochs) and the Schapekahn Brothers Construction Company at a cost of $35,000 beginning in 1889 and completed by 1901. The courthouse's architecture is German Renaissance Revival and consisted of a two story brick building with a central pavilion, a square tower, and several peaked gables. A jail and sheriff's office were both added to the courthouse from 1903 to 1904 at a cost of $20,000. The tower was formally removed in 1930, the Justice statue in the tower was moved into a niche which replaced the tower. Eight paintings in the courtroom were provided by local German artist Alexander Schwendinger (1862–1934), an associate of Anton Gag.

Additions were later added to the courthouse including a one story addition by Herman Koop & Sons of New Ulm in 1918 for a further $6,623. Later additions included female restrooms, HVAC, terrazzo flooring, and other modern amenities. In 1944 the entire building was painted in order to blend the various brickwork. Since 1965 the Brown County courthouse has had a further $1.1 million spent on modernizing the building including the addition of new offices, repainting, cleaning, and new windows, among other expenses. The courthouse currently serves Minnesota's 5th Judicial District.

== See also ==
- List of county courthouses in Minnesota
