= German Order of Harugari =

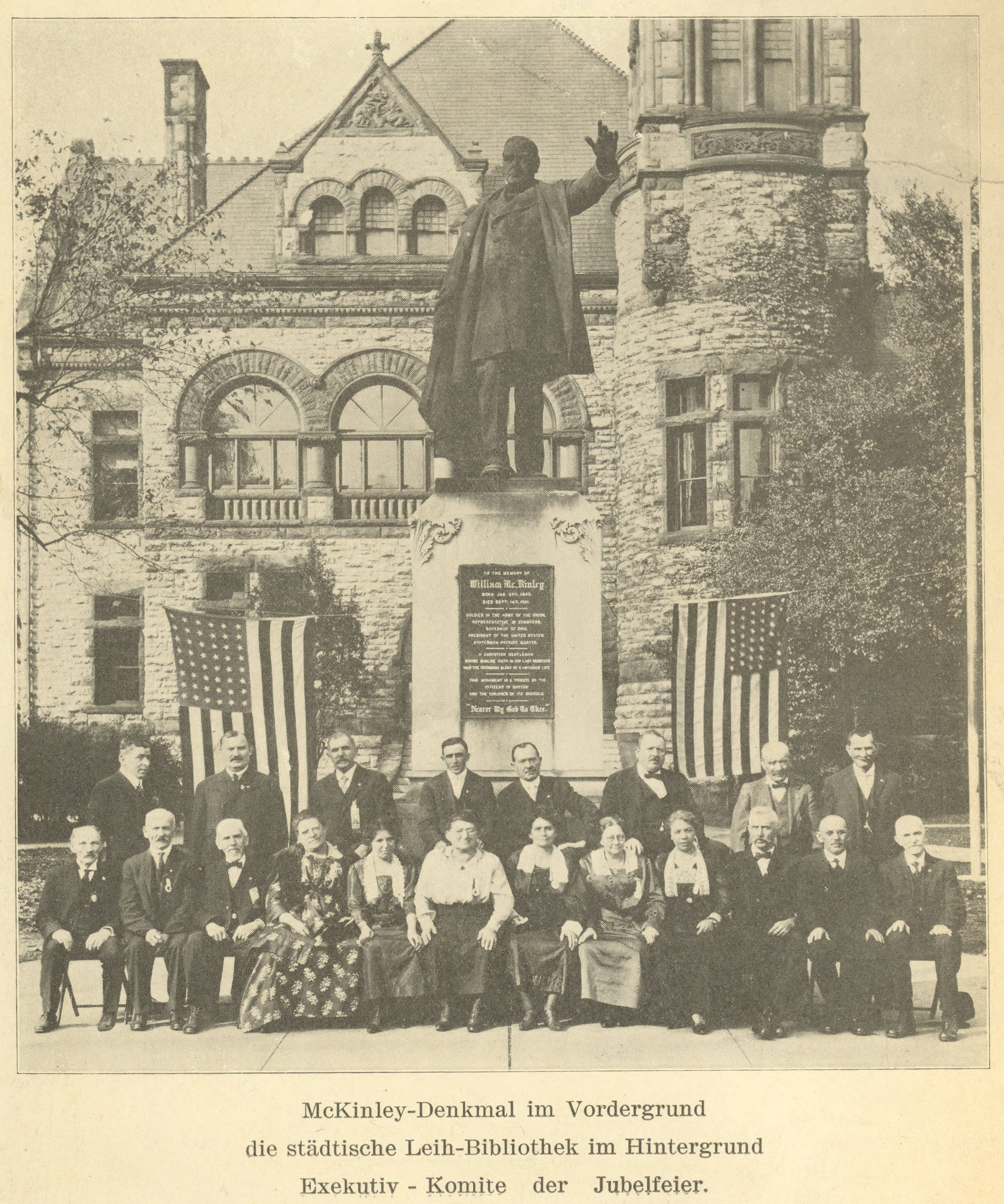
A group from the German Order of Harugari seated in front of the Old Main Library in Dayton, Ohio in February 1922. Photo from a commemorative book honoring the group's diamond jubilee celebration, February 21, 1922.

The German Order of Harugari, sometimes called the Ancient Order of Harugari or by its German name, Der Deutsche Orden der Harugari, is a mutual benefit and cultural association of German Americans founded in New York City in 1847 that was at one time the largest German secret society in the United States.

== History ==
The order was established on March 9, 1847, by Philipp Merkle, Fredrich Germann, Peter Schnatz, T. Rodrian, J. Deger, I. Germann, W. Schwartz, A. Glahn, V. Denzer, and S. Merz. The objectives were mutual protection in a time of high German immigration and anti-German sentiment in the U.S., and preservation of German language and culture. The order forbade discussion of religion, politics, or social issues.

The word harugari refers to worshipers in a sacred grove, or haruc, and demonstrates the founders' inspiration in Germanic paganism. It was also identified with the ancient Germanic tribe, the Cherusci; the order's first lodge, Arminia #1, was named for their leader Arminius, who defeated Publius Quinctilius Varus and destroyed three Roman legions in the Battle of the Teutoburg Forest.

The order grew slowly but steadily, being introduced successively into Pennsylvania, Illinois, Massachusetts, New Jersey, Maryland and Ohio.

Membership declined in the final decades of the nineteenth century as German immigrants became more assimilated.

In 1860 there was a split between two competing sections of the order, the Independent Order of Harugari and the Ancient German Order of Harugari. These merged in January 1869 into Der Deutsche Orden der Harugari. There was also a German Order of the Harugari of Illinois, organized in 1869 and incorporated independently in that state. A Harugari Cemetery was established in 1877 in Manchester, Missouri.

== Organization and membership ==
The order had a three-tier structure, with local subordinate lodges under the direction of grand lodges, which in turn were controlled by the Grand Lodge of the United States. Harugari was the largest of the German associations; by 1854 it had grown to 5,119 members, and by 1871 to over 20,000; in the 1870s there were over 300 Harugari lodges. It was hard-hit by the depression during that decade but rebounded. By 1896 there were 30,000 members in 300 lodges in 27 states. At one time its headquarters was located in Ozone Park, Queens. Alvin J. Schmidt was unable to ascertain whether it still existed in 1979, but in 1994 there were reportedly 90 members. Supreme officers were called "Bards" and members "Bretheren."

At the request of the New York and Pennsylvania state grand lodges, starting in 1890 the order instituted affiliates for women, known as "Hertha-lodges." There were 7,000 female members in 1896.

Like the Sons of Hermann, Harugari attracted more working-class members than other fraternal groups such as the Freemasons. In 1870 the head of the order described its membership as belonging to "the workers' estate."

There were three membership degrees. The order's motto was "Friendship, Love, and Humanity." Although it was considered altruistic, its critics accused it of being antagonistic to the Catholic Church.

== Cultural activities ==
Harugari promoted German-language singing; in 1887 there were 20,000 members in Harugari Singing Societies, and in 1895 the New York Times mentioned 50 Maennerchors and biennial Saengerfests. Surviving units of the Harugari still exist.
