= Turner Hall (New Ulm, Minnesota) =

- New Ulm Turner Hall
- U.S. National Register of Historic Places
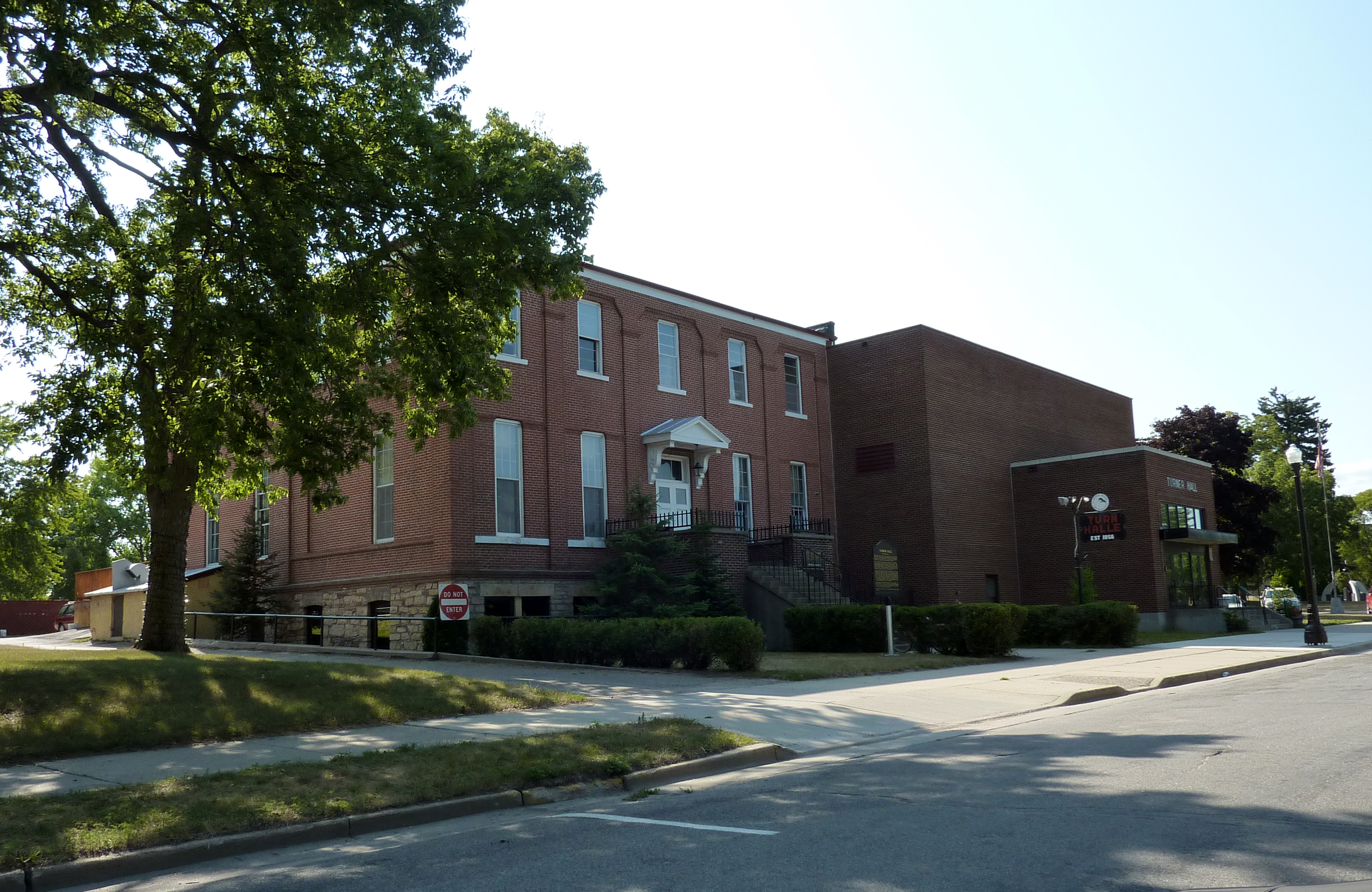
- Turner Hall in 2009

- Location within Minnesota Location within the United States
- Location: 102 S State St, New Ulm, Minnesota
- Coordinates: 44°18′37″N 94°27′39″W
- Area: 1 City Block
- Built: 1866, 1873–1954
- Architect: Julius Berndt
- Architectural style: Romanesque Revival architecture; Rundbogenstil
- Website: http://www.newulmturnerhall.org/
- MPS: Brown County MRA
- NRHP reference No.: 79001215
- Added to NRHP: December 31, 1979

The New Ulm Turner Hall or simply Turner Hall (German: Turnhalle) is an 1873 two-story gymnasium, rathskeller, and social club created by German-American Turners who helped settle New Ulm, Minnesota in the mid-nineteenth century. The building is a symbol of the city's founding, its German-American heritage, and a once-common German immigrant organization. According to the New Ulm Chamber of Commerce, the Turner Hall is the oldest bar and gymnasium in Minnesota still in operation.

== History ==
New Ulm, named after Ulm and Neu-Ulm, Germany is an ethnic German exurb and the county seat of Brown County, Minnesota. The city was founded in 1854 by Frederick Beinhorn, William Pfaender, and other German Americans, many of which were Turners, German revolutionaries, Forty-eighters, and adherents to governmental reform, classical liberalism, and federalism.

In the United States many German Turners formed associations (German: Vereins) throughout the eastern, midwestern, and western states. Turnvereins were the largest secular German-American organizations within the country in the nineteenth century and held various conventions as a political body. Turners were not only athletic but also political, many of which also acted as sporting clubs, social clubs, hunting clubs, and in times of need, militias.

Many of the Germans who settled New Ulm came from Cincinnati which had a large German diaspora, others came from Louisville, Kentucky which also had a large German neighborhood. Many Germans left Ohio and Kentucky after the Bloody Monday riots which killed several German Catholic immigrant families. On his own initiative, Frederick Beinhorn founded the Chicago Land Association and later with William Pfaender created the German Land Association in Chicago which speculated land in Minnesota Territory which eventually became the city of New Ulm.

== The First Turner Hall ==
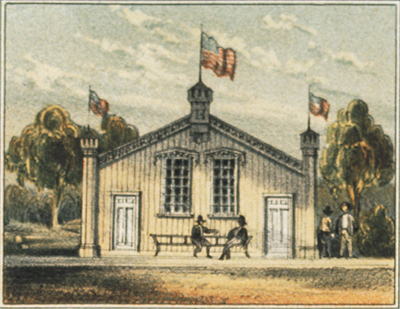
Image of the 1850s Turner Hall in New Ulm, Minnesota

The New Ulm Turnverein was founded on November 11, 1856, the first Turner Hall was erected in New Ulm that same year and finished in late 1856 to early 1857. According to writer Alice Felt Tyler:

"The first Turner Hall in New Ulm was built in 1857 as a genuine community enterprise, for the work was done on Sundays and the logs were felled and floated downstream to the sawmill "borrowed" for the occasion. The building was the largest in town, forty by seventy feet, with a small tower at each end. It was used for all Turner activities, for a school until one could be built, and for all varieties of public meetings. The first of many theatrical performances was held there in 1858".

During the Dakota War of 1862 the original wooden Turner Hall was burned during the Battles of New Ulm and destroyed. The current hall sits on top of the location of the original 1856 Turner Hall's location.

== The Second Turner Hall ==
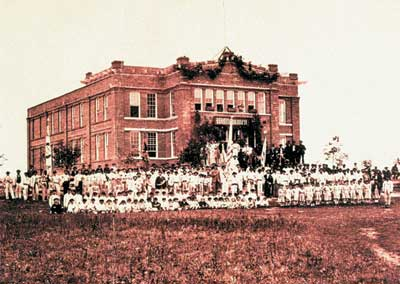
The Second Turner Hall during Turnfest c. 1866. Brown County Museum.

In 1866 a second Turner Hall was erected by local German-born architect Julius Berndt on top of the previous site of the 1856 hall. Berndt was later the architect of the Hermann Heights Monument. A large addition was added to the southern portion of the building in 1873. The northern section has been replaced twice; the southern 1873 section still remains standing. The first replacement to the building was a separate gymnasium and theatre facilities, superseded the 1866 section of the building which was later burned in a fire on January 7, 1952.

=== Later additions ===
The second (existing) northern section of the Turner Hall was completed in 1954 after the 1952 fire. This addition, a simple rectangular brick structure, made partial use of remaining walls, eliminated an auditorium, and included a rathskeller on the lower level and a gymnasium on the upper level.

Surviving portions of the 1873 section of the building include a two-story (plus basement) rectangular brick building, five bays wide at the front and includes symmetrical windows, brickwork, and an early pedimented entrance hood which still remain intact. In the meantime small modifications took place, such as the removal of pilasters and a small alteration to the original entrance staircase. The interior includes a lounge on the lower level and meeting rooms on the top two floors.

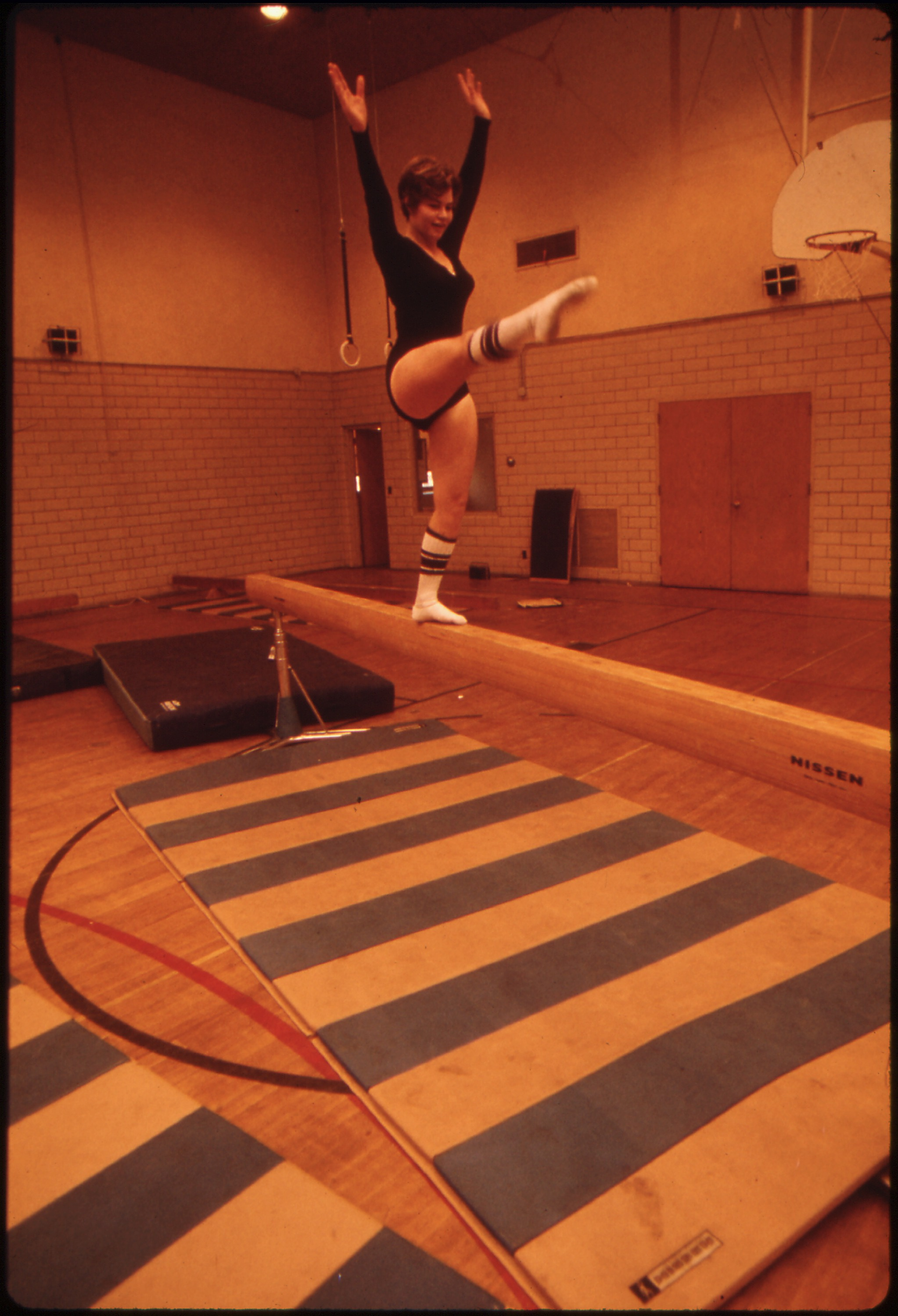
A young gymnast training at the New Ulm Turner Hall gymnasium c. 1970. National Archives and Records Administration.

Since its creation the building was used as a social club as well as for public meetings, concerts, and theatre. On December 31, 1979, the building was added to the National Register of Historic Places for its cultural significance to both the city of New Ulm and the broader county.

=== Rathskeller and murals ===
The basement of the Turner Hall includes a Rathskeller which has been heavily utilized by the local chapter of the Sons of Hermann, among other local clubs and societies well into the 21st-century. Wall murals in the Rathskeller were originally painted in 1873 by Guido Scheller, the husband of actress Marie Methua-Scheller, which depict various German scenes. Other artists including Christian Heller (1887), Anton Gag (1901), and Carl Pfänder, among others, completed additional artwork within the Rathskeller. The murals were covered up and hidden during the World War I era when Anti-German sentiment was heavy in the state of Minnesota. From November 2012 to June 2014 the murals were part of a series of projects by the Minnesota Historical and Cultural Heritage Grants which allowed them to be conserved.

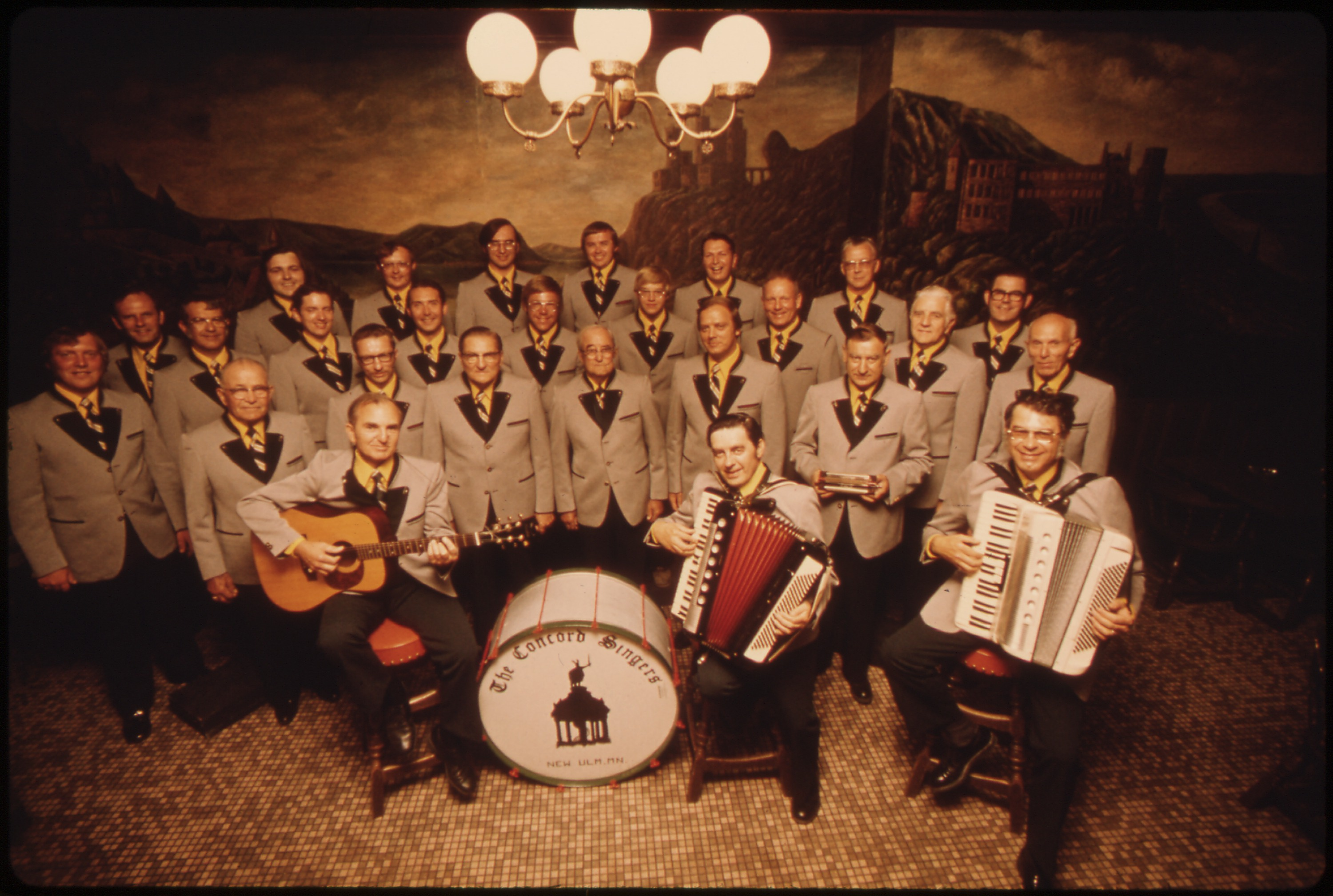
Members of the Concord Singers photographed at the Turner Hall c. 1970. National Archives and Records Administration.

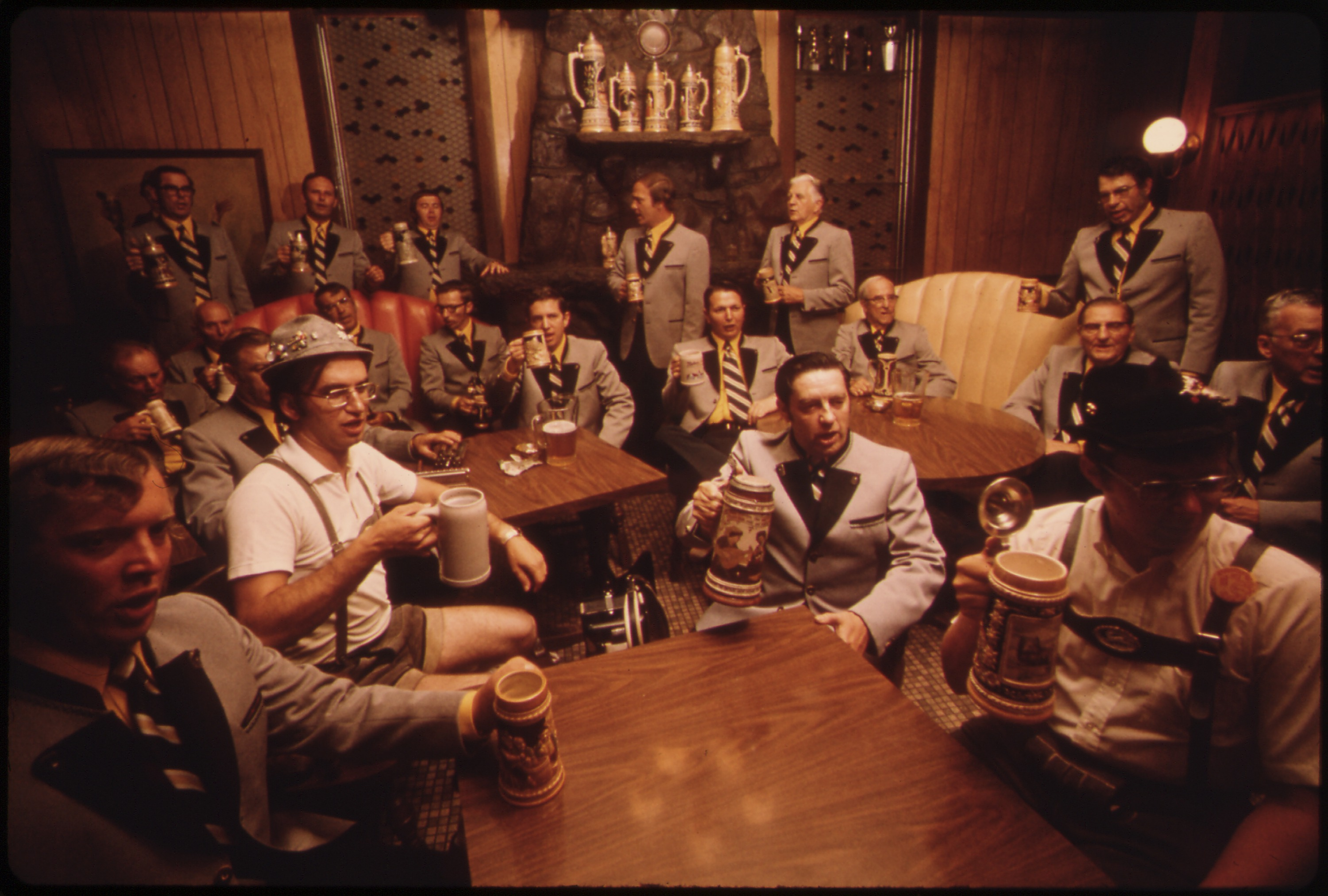
Members of the Concord Singers drinking beer at the Turner Hall. c. 1970. National Archives and Records Administration.

== Turnfest ==
Turnfest is a national festival which celebrates the history of German Americans, Turners, and gymnastics. It is held every four years, with the first celebration taking place in 1851 in Philadelphia. The New Ulm Turner Hall has been chosen on multiple occasions to be the host of Turnfest as far back as 1865-66. In recent history the New Ulm Turner Hall and Rathskeller are utilized as a venue for weddings, celebrations, clubs, and ceremonies.

== Notable patrons ==
Notable patrons and contributors to the New Ulm Turner Hall include: William Pfaender, Joseph Bobleter, Anton Gag, Carl Pfänder, Christian Heller, Guido Scheller, and Julius Berndt, among others.

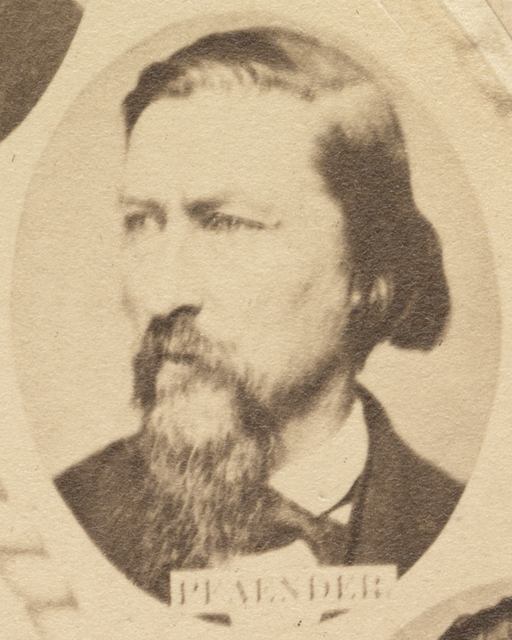
William Pfaender

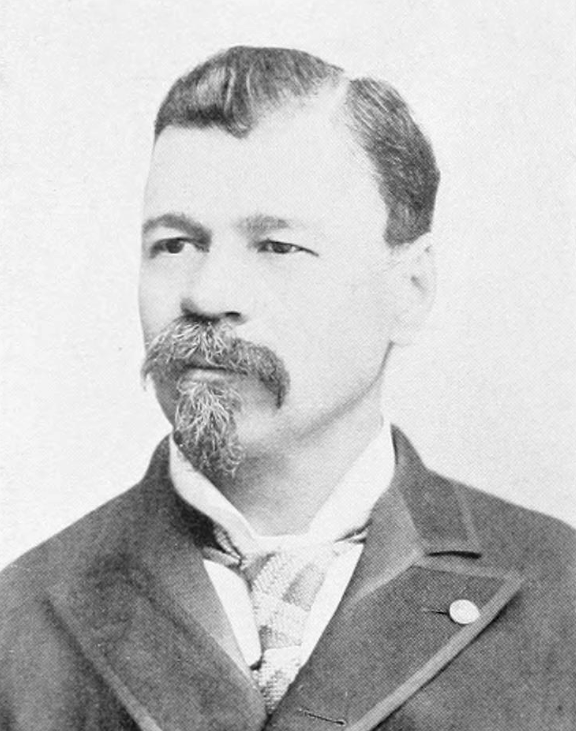
Joseph Bobleter

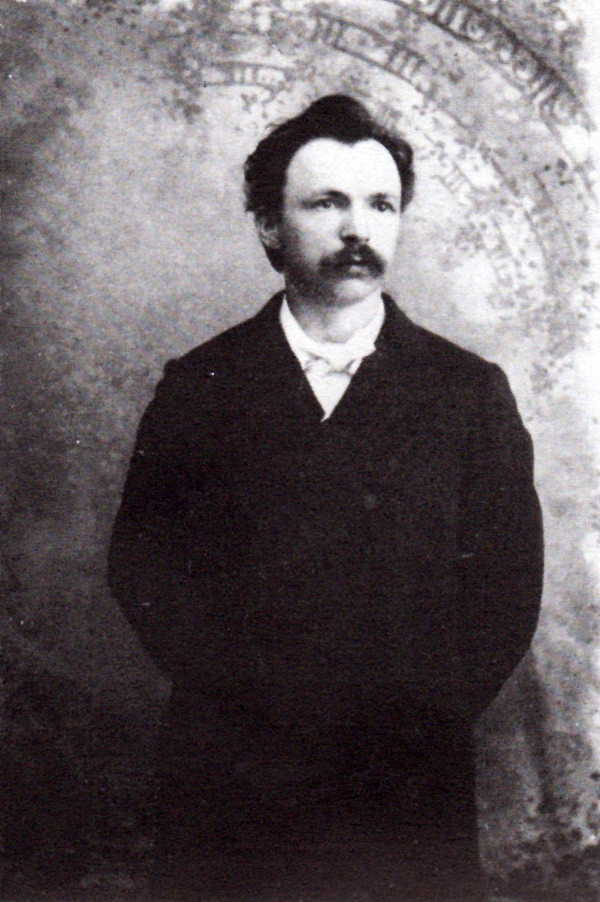
Anton Gag

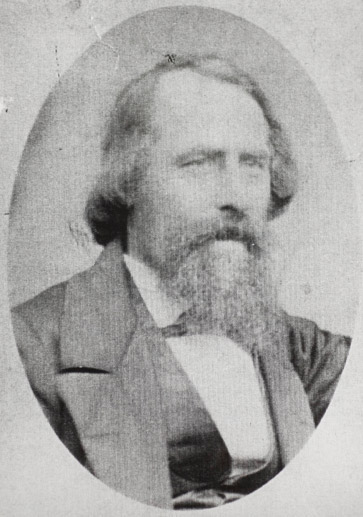
Carl Pfänder
