= South Broadway Historic District =

South Broadway Historic District may refer to the following places:

- South Broadway Historic District (New Ulm, Minnesota), listed on the National Register of Historic Places
- South Broadway Historic District (De Pere, Wisconsin), listed on the National Register of Historic Places
