= Julius Berndt =

American architect (1832–1916)

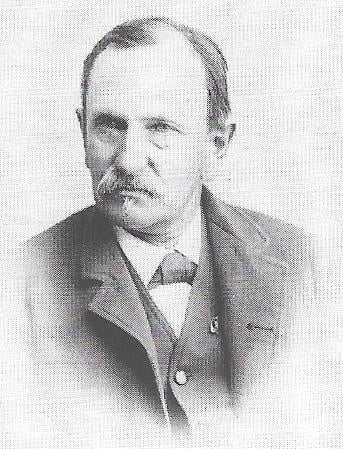
- Berndt c. 1890
- Born: March 18, 1832; Heinrichau, Province of Silesia, (modern day Henryków, Poland)
- Died: July 13, 1916 (aged 84); New Ulm, Minnesota, US
- Citizenship: Prussia; United States
- Occupations: Draftsman; Architect
- Notable work: Hermann Heights Monument; Grand Hotel (New Ulm, Minnesota)
- Style: Italianate; Neoclassical; Graeco-Roman
- Political party: Republican
- Spouse: Wilhelmina "Mina" Kiesling
- Relatives: Anton Gag (son-in-law); William Pfaender (In-law)

Julius Berndt (March 18, 1832 – July 13, 1916) was a German American architect, drafter, surveyor, general contractor, and early settler of the city of New Ulm, Minnesota. Many structures in New Ulm were designed by Berndt including both the Hermann Heights Monument and the Grand Hotel.

== Early life ==
Berndt was born on March 18, 1832 in Heinrichau, Province of Silesia, then part of Prussia, to Johann and Josepha (Kottvitz) Berndt. Johann was a merchant in Breslau. Seeking to improve his life, he emigrated to the United States around 1850 and worked in Chicago. Johann was later joined in 1853 by two of his sons, Julius and Herman, who helped him as clerks. Johann would eventually die from cholera during the 1846–1860 cholera pandemic.

Julius was educated at the University of Warsaw in drafting, civil engineering, and architecture. In 1857 Julius joined William Pfaender's Chicago Land Association (German: Chicago Landverein) and eventually purchased land in Brown County, Minnesota which would eventually be the city of New Ulm.

Berndt was elected as the first surveyor of Brown County and became a general contractor for the city from 1857 until his retirement in 1899. During the Dakota War of 1862 Berndt was elected as one of the Provost Marshals for the city and was later appointed as a Lieutenant of the Brown County militia's light artillery battery under the command of the 22nd Infantry Regiment.

== Architectural career ==
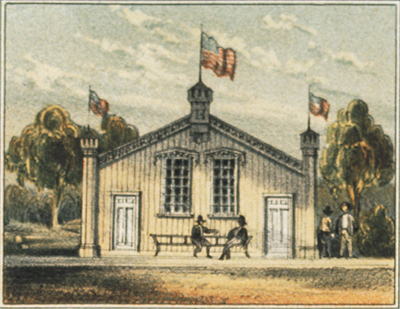
The first New Ulm Turner Hall c.1857

=== New Ulm's First Turner Hall ===
Berndt began his career as a building contractor and architect in New Ulm by drafting and building the first Turner Hall in 1857 which was later burned during the Battles of New Ulm during the Dakota War of 1862.

=== Brown County courthouse ===
Berndt's first major contract was to build a courthouse and adjoining jail for the local Sheriff Charles L. Roos. This building was completed at the cost of $2,964. According to the Minnesota Judicial Branch "Berndt's 1865 courthouse was a simple two-story Georgian style building with a hipped roof, central doorway, and evenly spaced paneled windows". Berndt was later contracted in 1873 to make a larger courthouse, this time at the cost of $10,000.

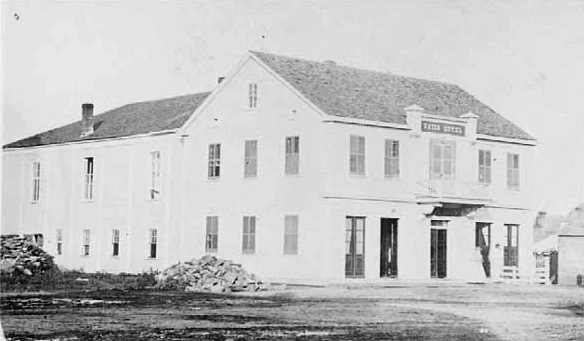
The original Minnesota Haus Hotel, or Union Hotel, which was owned by Phillip H. Gross. The building was later destroyed by a fire on July 5, 1875.

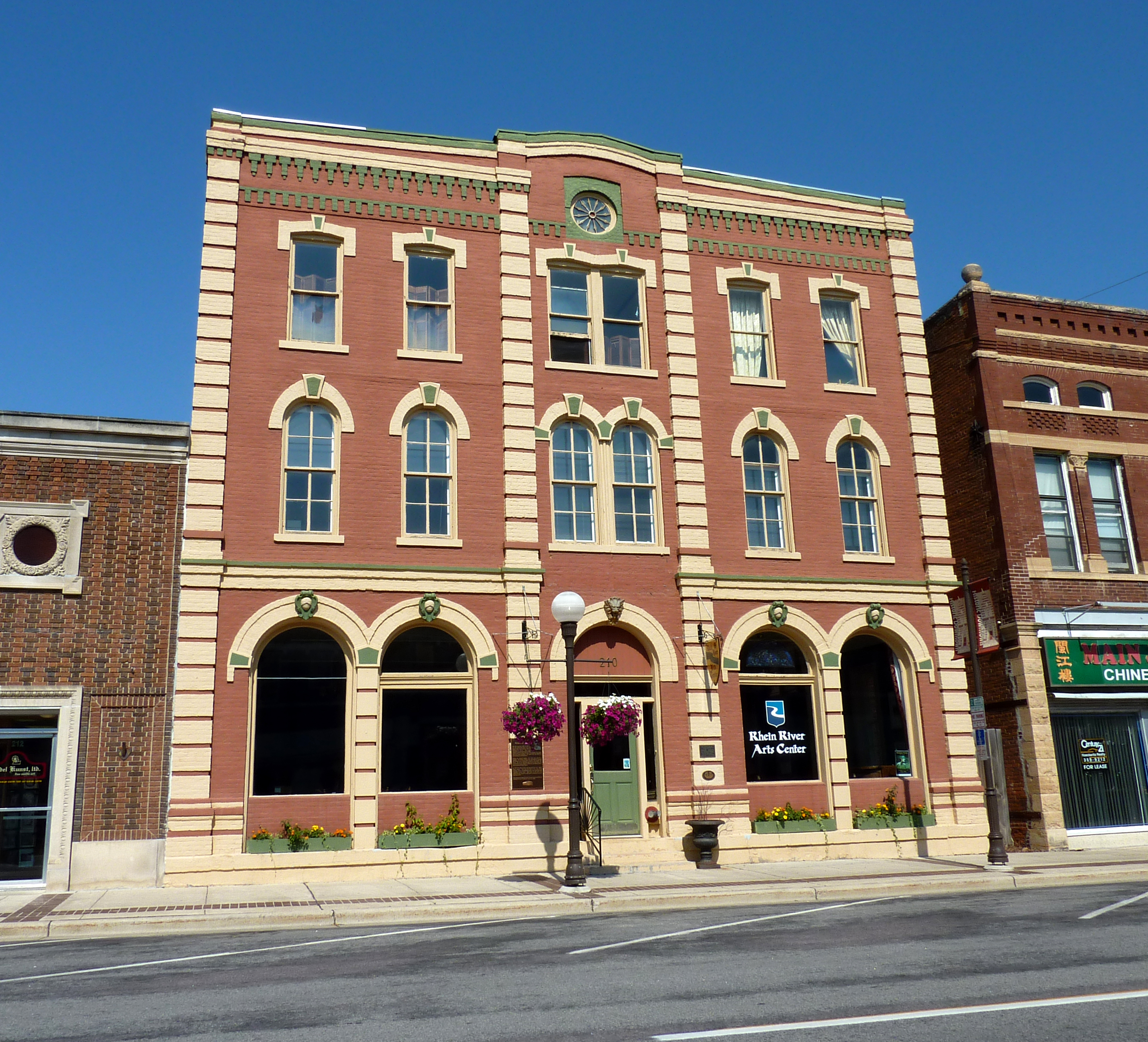
The Grand Hotel in New Ulm, built by Berndt in 1876.

=== New Ulm's Grand Hotel ===
In 1876 Berndt constructed the Union Hotel, later called the Grand Hotel, in New Ulm's historic business district. The building was once the site of the Minnesota Haus, the only room and board available in New Ulm until 1875 when it was burned in a fire. The three-story Italianate-style brick building is a great example of Berndt's exploration into Italianate architecture. The first iteration of the Union Hotel originally consisted of only two stories. The third story was added in 1899 when it was refurbished and renovated by new proprietors. The Grand Hotel was added to the National Register of Historic Places on June 21, 1990 and is listed as a culturally significant property to both the city of New Ulm and Brown County.

=== Henry Subilia House ===
Born in Gressoney-Saint-Jean, Henry A. Subilia (1819-1899) was of Swiss-Italian ancestry and was a Forty-Eighter who had come to the United States after the German revolutions of 1848–1849. Subilia was an early member of the New Ulm community and established the Waraju Distillery in 1861 which produced Whisky. The distillery was later destroyed during the Battles of New Ulm. Subilia was also the County Auditor from 1863-1864. Berndt was contracted to build Subilia's home in the 1870's-1880's. The Subilia home once stood at 504 S Minnesota Street in New Ulm, but it has since been demolished.

The early 20th-century emblem of the Sons of Hermann which features Berndt's Hermann Monument.

=== Hermann Monument ===
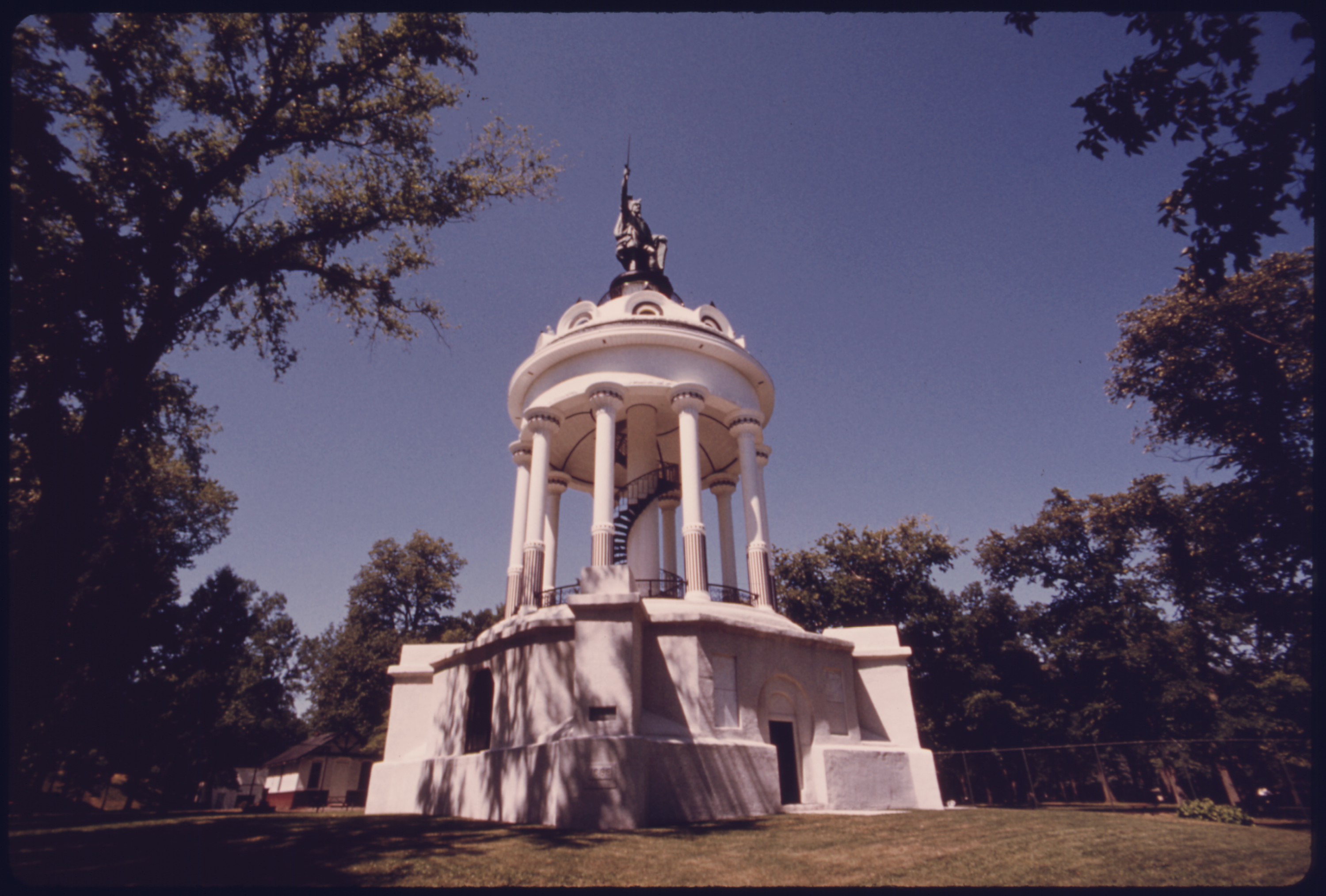
The Hermann Heights monument c.1970 National Archives and Records Administration

The Hermann Heights Monument, also called the Hermann Monument, or simply Hermann the German, was arguably Berndt's magnum opus. The idea of Berndt's monument was derived from the Hermannsdenkmal near Detmold by German sculptor, painter, and architect Ernst von Bandel. Bandel's statue of Arminius (German: Hermann), a Cherusci warrior who fought against the Roman Empire in the Battle of the Teutoburg Forest, became a national symbol of Germany in 1875 which was popular shortly after the Franco-Prussian War and the Unification of Germany. The Hermannsdenkmal was ultimately the greatest influence and inspiration for Berndt to create his own regional monument dedicated to German Americans.

Berndt was the head of the New Ulm lodge of the Order of the Sons of Hermann (German: Orden der Hermann’s-Soehne), which was a patriotic German fraternalorganization similar to the Odd Fellows and other organizations during the Golden Age of Fraternalism. In September 1881 Berndt first proposed making an American version of Bandel's Hermann monument at the fifteenth national convention of the Sons of Hermann. Many cities were debated as the host city of the monument including both Milwaukee and St. Paul, both of which had large German populations. New Ulm was ultimately chosen however, as the city was the epitome of deutschtum or "Germanness" in the United States.

Berndt eventually advertised the project nationwide on a campaign to raise money from 1881-1888. The cornerstone for the monument was eventually laid in June 1888. Berndt's Hermann sculpture was contracted by the W. H. Mullins Manufacturing Company of Salem, Ohio which was created by Alfonso Pelzer, a German sculptor. Pelzer eventually completed the copper sculpture in 1889. According to the monuments official website:

"The statue was shipped to New Ulm in pieces on a rail gondola in July 1889. However, financial problems hindered completion of the base and the statue was stored in a shed for many years".

The monument is made of a variety of materials including Kasota limestone, red brick, marble and iron. The Hermann monument stands at 102 feet (31.08 meters), making Berndt's Hermann the third tallest copper statue in the United States following Portlandia and the Statue of Liberty. The copper statue itself stands on a 70 ft (21 m) iron column encircled by a spiral staircase to the cupola, which is supported by 10 iron columns and a Kasota limestone base.

Berndt's monument was completed in 1897 and was unveiled to the public on Sunday September 26, 1897 to a crowd of several thousand people. So many patrons turned out to see the monument that New Ulm was described as the "German Mecca" by the New Ulm Review. The monument underwent several renovations throughout the years including spot repairs, reinforcement of the metal sculpture, and water leaks among others.

The Hermann Heights Monument was added to the National Register of Historic Places on October 2, 1973 and is listed as a culturally significant monument to both the city of New Ulm and Brown County, as well as German Americans. In 2000 the 106th United States Congress recognized Berndt's monument as a culturally significant symbol to the contributions of Germans in the United States.

== Personal life ==
Berndt married Wilhelmina "Mina" Kiesling (1844-1933) whose family was from the Kingdom of Saxony and were among the first of the people to settle New Ulm. In total the Berndt's had 12 children, 7 boys and 5 girls. One of Berndt's daughters, Sophia "Sophie" Berndt, would marry William Pfaender Jr., the son of William Pfaender. Another one of Berndt's daughters, Ida Berndt, married the famous artist Anton Gag but would die at the young age of 23.

Berndt was a very active member in the New Ulm community. He was an original member of the local Turner Hall, the Sons of Hermann, and local Freemason lodge where he held the rank of Tyler.

== Later life ==
Berndt's later work includes a variety of parade triumphal arches and ice palaces among other projects in New Ulm. Berndt died on July 13, 1916 in New Ulm at the age of 84. His funeral rites were conducted by the Sons of Hermann.

== Notable works ==
Several of Berndt's works can still be seen in New Ulm, Minnesota including:

- The First New Ulm Turner Hall (destroyed by fire during the Battles of New Ulm).
- The Hermann Heights Monument.
- The Grand Hotel (New Ulm, Minnesota).
- Local Whisky distillery owner Henry A. Subilia's house at 504 South Minnesota Street in New Ulm (demolished).
- The Julius Berndt House (demolished).
- The Brown County Courthouse (Minnesota).
