= Ochs Building =

Ochs Building may refer to:

- Ochs Building (Davenport, Iowa), formerly listed on the National Register of Historic Places in Scott County, Iowa
- Adolph C. Ochs House, Springfield, Minnesota, listed on the National Register of Historic Places in Brown County, Minnesota
- Ochs Building (Chattanooga, Tennessee), listed on the National Register of Historic Places in Hamilton County, Tennessee
