= Philipp Merkle =

Philipp Merkle, also known as Philip Merkle and Philip Merkel (March 20, 1811, Frainshaims, Rhineland-Palatinate – May 5, 1899, New York City) was a prominent German-American Freethinker and preacher in New York in the nineteenth century who was active as a Masonic leader and also co-founded two influential German-American fraternal societies, one of which became the largest such organization.

Merkle attended the University of Würzburg to study medicine, but at his father's request transferred to Heidelberg University and studied theology. He was imprisoned for political activities in connection with the 1832 uprisings, but was released on appeal and graduated as a minister, second highest in his class. Unable to find an appointment because of his record, he emigrated to the United States in 1833. He became pastor of the German Lutheran Church in Newark, New Jersey, then after a year started the German Universal Christian Church at 143 Chrystie Street in New York. He was the minister there until 1857, when he was appointed Special Examiner of Drugs for New York State, then City Excise Commissioner, then elected City Coroner. He was active in Democratic politics, for many years a member of the General Committee of Tammany Hall, and one of the leaders of the successful defence against increasing Republican influence in Little Germany in the 1856 and 1860 elections.

Merkel was a Freemason leader in the German-American community. After being initiated in 1844, he founded and headed two new lodges, in 1853 and 1857, and was made an honorary member of four others.

Before that, in 1847 he was the primary founder of the German Order of Harugari, which became the largest German-American fraternal order. Merkle left his position as minister to concentrate on promoting Harugari, which he saw as a continuation of German workers' radicalism.

He also led the group that founded the Sons of Hermann in 1840.
