= Grand Hotel (New Ulm, Minnesota) =

- U.S. National Register of Historic Places
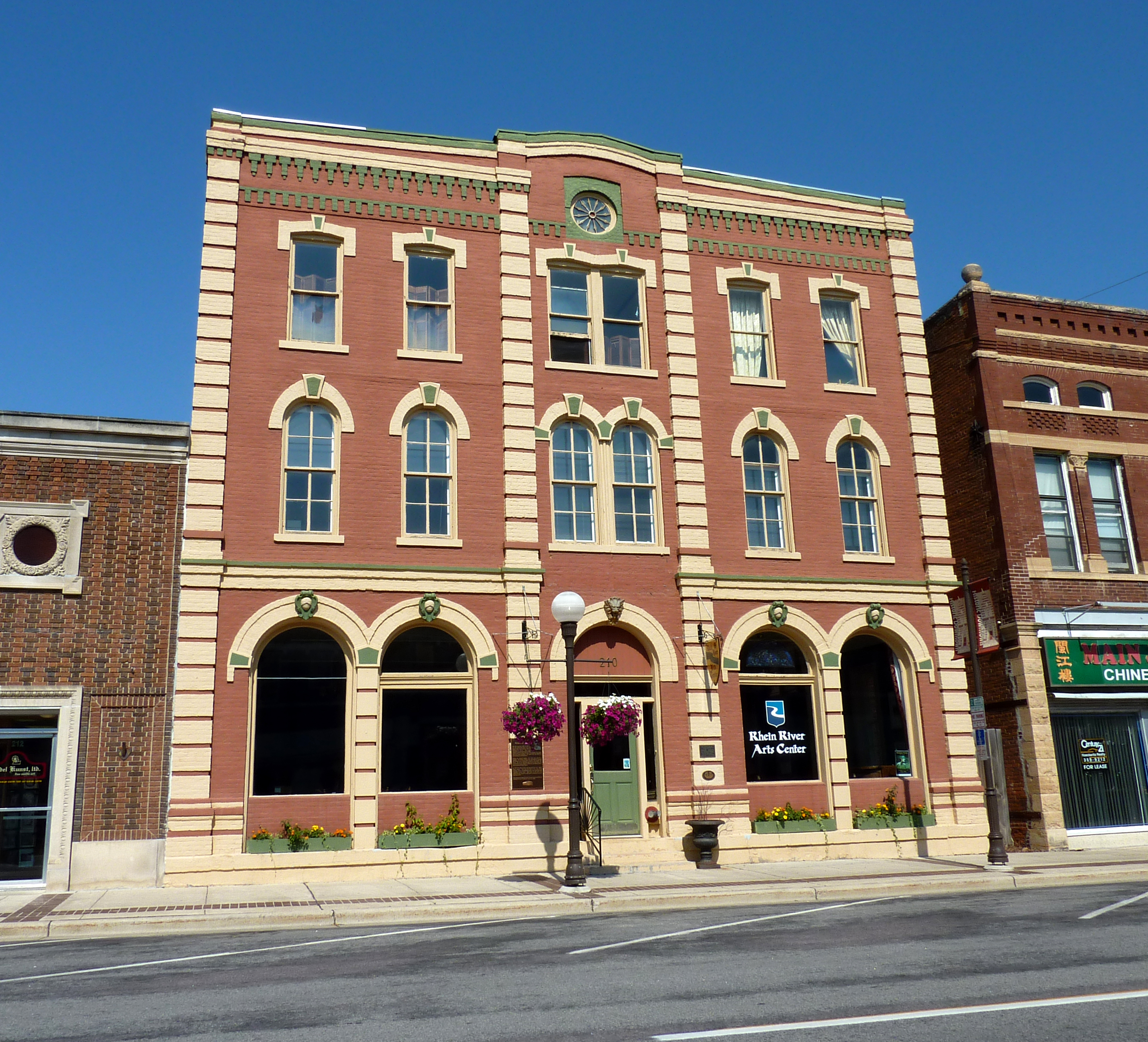

- Location within Minnesota Location within the United States
- Location: 210 N. Minnesota St., New Ulm, Minnesota
- Coordinates: 44°18′56.8″N 94°27′39.5″W
- Area: less than one acre
- Built: 1876
- Architect: Julius Berndt
- Architectural style: Italianate
- NRHP reference No.: 90000986
- Added to NRHP: June 21, 1990

The Grand Hotel is a historic hotel in New Ulm, Minnesota, United States. The private, commercial structure was placed on the National Register of Historic Places (NRHP) on June 21, 1990. The building is notable because of its association with the development of New Ulm's business district and as an example of Italianate architecture in a commercial building.

== Structure ==
The Grand Hotel is a three-story Italianate-style brick building located in the center of New Ulm's historic business district. The structure originally had only two stories when it opened as the Union Hotel in 1876. New owners added the third story in 1899 during a thorough renovation where heating, plumbing and lighting fixtures were upgraded and a brick addition was extended from the rear; they renamed it the Grand Hotel.

The south-facing street facade is divided into three bays by pilasters; the center bay is narrower than the other two. Fenestration is different on the three levels: the first floor consists of a transomed central entrance with sidelights flanked by rusticated brick pilasters and large, paired plate glass storefront windows. All five of the first floor openings are set in semicircular brick arches; each window has a decorative cartouche as a keystone. In the center of the arched doorway is a carved lion's head. The formal balance used by the Italianate design is accentuated by the brick quoins. The window to the immediate right of the main entrance was a storefront entrance, but it was altered on an unknown date to match the remaining windows. A corbel table provides horizontal division between the first and second floors. The second story consists of six identical four by four double hung windows featuring stone sills and raised brick Gothic arches with keystones. The two center windows are paired. The remnants of a cornice are visible just above the keystones on the second story. The windows on the top floor are similar to the second except they are one by one sash and have nearly flat brick arches with keystones. A row of corbeled brick in the form of dentils surmount these windows, and there is a large round window centered in the facade. Additional corbeled bricks serve as an elaborate terminus to the building. The gable roof has a slight pitch and each wall as a parapet.

The west sidewall is pierced on the third floor by five double hung windows, two of which are one by one sash. The east elevation features eight double hung windows on the first floor, seven on the second, and six on the third; all of these opening have stone sills with segmental brick arches. The rear of the building has the 1899 one-story brick addition with a skillion roof.

Other than minor repainting and the removal of the awnings, the exterior of the building has undergone few changes since the 1899 redesign. The building was sandblasted in 1970, and in 1987 the building was tuckpointed and a new roof and fire sprinkler system was added. The building has since been repainted to look as it did in the late 19th century.

== History ==
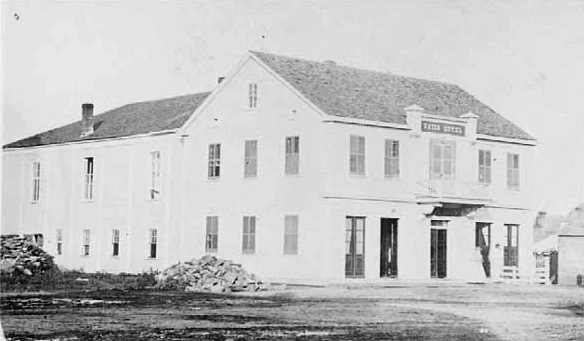
The Union Hotel, the second hotel on the site, c. 1862.

After treaties were signed with local Native American tribes in 1851, the Minnesota River Valley was opened for settlement. In 1854, the first large group of settlers from the Chicago Land Society arrived in Brown County. The Society was organized by German immigrants in Chicago who desired to establish their own Midwestern colony, and New Ulm was platted in 1855. They were soon joined by Turner Germans from Cincinnati and formed the German Land Association of Minnesota. New Ulm was planned as a trading and agricultural center, but was unlike other area settlements in that it was not planned by or for the railroad; rather, the development relied on steamboats on the Minnesota River until the 1870s.

The 1860 population of New Ulm was 635, with only two of non-German descent. Among the predominantly German population was Phillip H. Gross. Gross was born in Germany on October 12, 1809, and was a baker by trade. His first wife was a widow with three children, and together they had five more; she died in 1853 and he married again and had another five children with his second wife. He came to the United States in 1854, spending his first two years in Milwaukee, Wisconsin. In 1856 he joined a group going to New Ulm and started a hotel.

The two-story wood-frame building was called the Minnesota Haus, and was the only business in the community providing room and board to visitors. Business was good, and after the hotel burned down in 1860, Gross rebuilt and renamed it as the larger Union Hotel. The hotel became a focal point of activity in New Ulm and during the Dakota War of 1862, when New Ulm itself was put under siege, served as a hospital as over 185 of the city's buildings were burned. Among the doctors at the hospital was William Worrall Mayo, who would later found the Mayo Clinic in Rochester, Minnesota. Commercial activity increased after the conflict increased as a new influx of settlers arrived to take advantage of land provided through the Homestead Act. New Ulm began developing into a producer, exporter and processor of agricultural products and became a regional center once the railroad arrived in the area in 1872. The Union Hotel flourished, but was destroyed by fire on July 5, 1875. The fire began in an adjacent large barn belonging to the hotel which spread to the main structure; the hotels furniture was saved but fire fighting efforts moved to saving other structures on the street. The loss was estimated at $6,000; Gross was insured to $4,200.

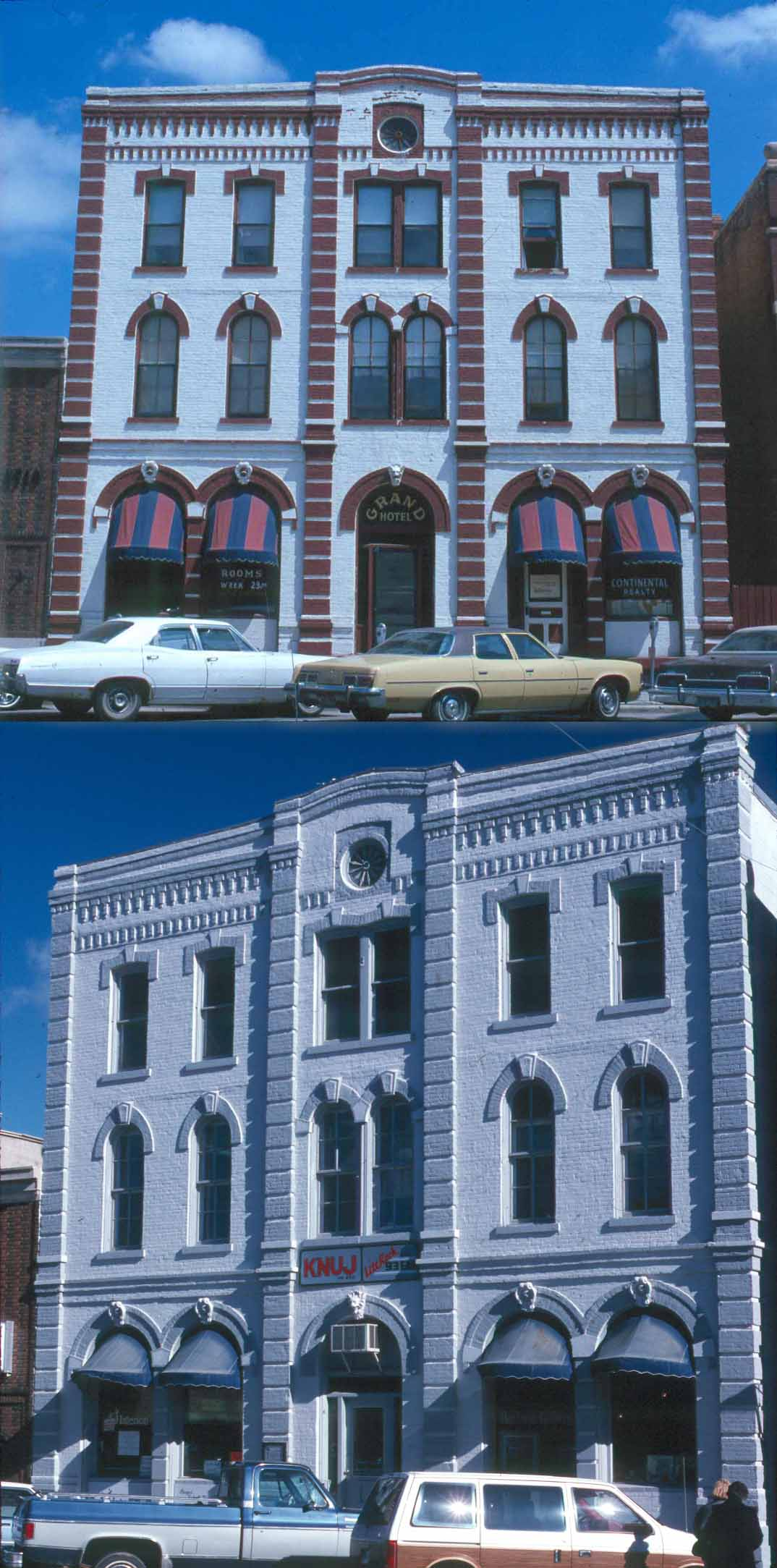
The Grand Hotel has had several color schemes over its lifetime before the most recent owner reverted it back to its late-1800s look.

Gross immediately rebuilt the hotel as a two-story brick structure, hiring architect Julius Berndt, who would go on to design the Hermann Monument. Gross operated it until retiring in 1885; he died on September 19, 1895. His son-in-law, Wenzel Schotzko, took over managing the hotel. Meanwhile, by 1884 two other hotels opened in New Ulm and in 1899 a new owner of the Union Hotel added the third floor and conducted renovations that brought the hotel's exterior to its present form. The renamed Grand Hotel had thirty sleeping rooms, an office, a new kitchen and large dining room which occupied half of the first floor. As a result of these changes, the hotel continued to play an important role in downtown New Ulm into the 20th century.

Over the ensuing years, the building fell out of use as a hotel and went through a succession of owners and various occupants. In 1970 it was purchased and turned into a boarding house. In the 1990s it housed a coffee shop, framing gallery and radio station KNUJ; the third floor was vacant. In 2000, Anne Makepeace, the great-great-granddaughter of Philip Gross, purchased the building with her husband and members of her family. In February 2003, the Makepeaces began restoring the building to its original appearance in the late 19th century. It currently houses a restaurant, the Grand Kabaret, and shops.

== Significance ==
The Grand Hotel is significant because of its association with the development of New Ulm's business district, which played a central role in the economic growth of the southern Minnesota River Valley in the late 19th and early 20th centuries. It is also architecturally noteworthy as a good example of an Italianate commercial building. It is the finest largely unaltered example of mid-Victorian period commercial design in New Ulm and the surrounding area. Other commercial buildings of larger size with greater detailing remain in New Ulm, but the majority were constructed at least ten years later and have had their street level facades dramatically altered (see the Boesch, Hummel, and Maltzahn Block); as such, no building in the downtown commercial district has retained such a high degree of historic architectural integrity.
