= Nora Unitarian Universalist Church =

Historic church in Minnesota, United States

- Nora Free Christian Church
- U.S. National Register of Historic Places
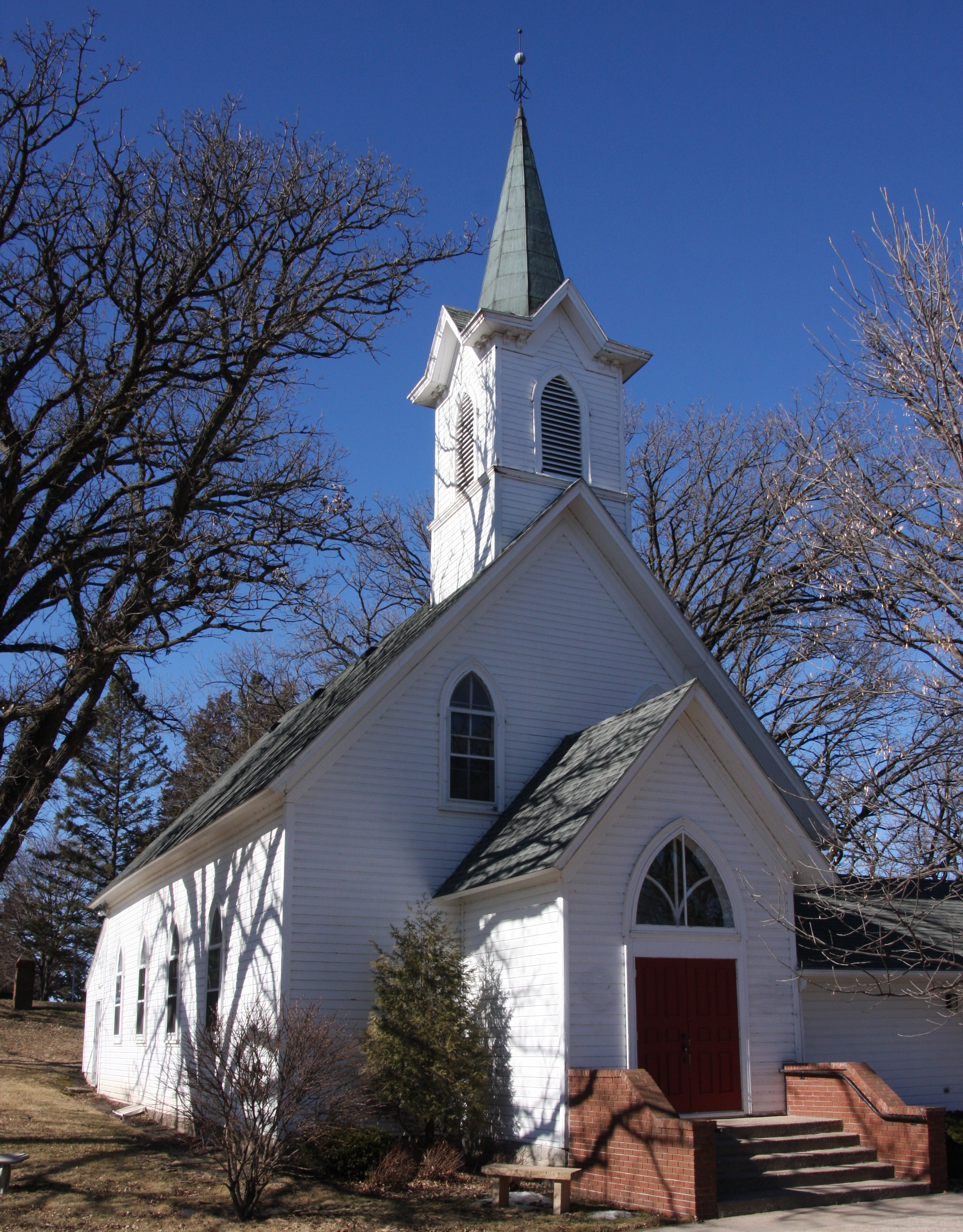
- The church in 2017

- Location within Minnesota Location within the United States
- Nearest city: Hanska, Minnesota
- Coordinates: 44°8′36″N 94°28′52″W
- Area: 4.1 acres (1.7 ha)
- Built: 1883
- Architectural style: Gothic, Queen Anne
- NRHP reference No.: 88001176
- Added to NRHP: August 4, 1988

Nora Unitarian Universalist Church, originally called Nora Free Christian Church, is a historic church in Hanska, Minnesota, United States. The congregation was formed by a number of Brown County citizens who dissented from the Norwegian Lutheran community. They found Kristofer Janson, who also had some dissenting opinions from the Lutheran Church of Norway and who was visiting the Midwest on a lecture tour. Janson had previously founded the Free Christian Church of Minneapolis, later known as the Nazareth Church. The organizers of the church in Hanska asked Janson to be their minister, and he came to the area and established the church in January 1882. By the fall of 1882, the congregation had raised enough money to build a church. It was built the next spring and hosted its first service on July 8, 1883. The next week's service on July 15 would be the last, because the building was demolished by a tornado on July 21. Some critics said it was God's punishment for a group of dissenters.

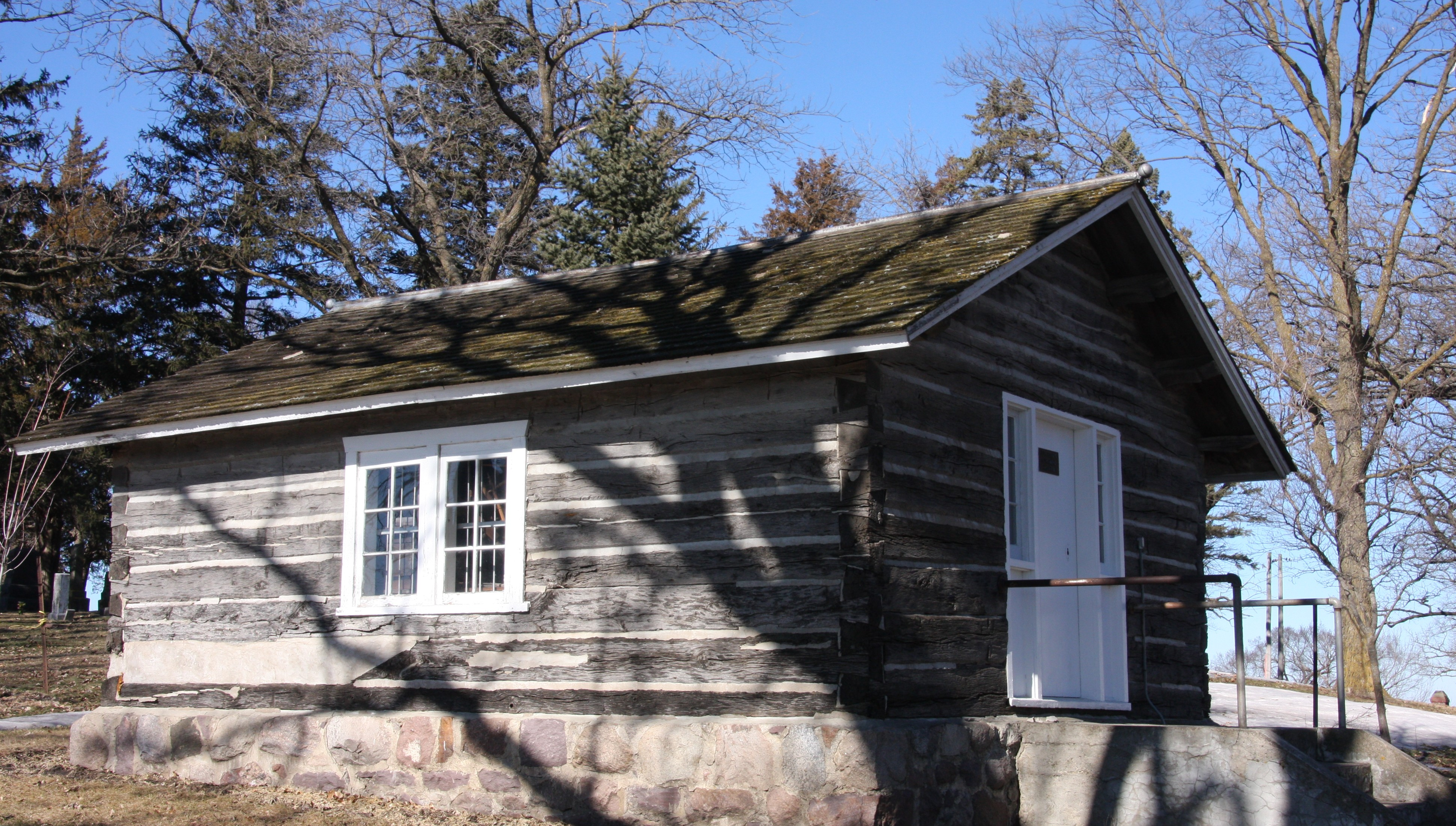
Nora church museum

The church was rebuilt later in 1883, and it was dedicated on July 13, 1884. Janson spent his summers at the church in Hanska and spent his winters in Minneapolis, and he called the Nora church a refuge from city life and a "paradise".

Janson returned to Norway in 1893 and continued his ministry there, but he continued to correspond with his former congregation until he died in 1917. The successor pastor, Amandus Norman, served until 1931, and the church has continued to grow and flourish since then. It was listed on the National Register of Historic Places in 1988.
