= Monumental Bronze Company =

The Monumental Bronze Company of Bridgeport, Connecticut was a monumental mason firm specializing in the production of white bronze (zinc) monumental masonry, active between 1875 and 1912 with subsidiaries throughout the United States (Des Moines, Iowa, Detroit, Michigan, Chicago, Illinois), and Canada.

There were a number of American companies in the 1880s that through their catalogs sold zinc ornaments nationwide, such as “urns, eagles, civic ornaments, architectural details, and even cigar store Indians.” Mullins of Salem, Ohio was the most prominent but only Monumental Bronze purveyed it in grave markers.

A popular white bronze model was the "Infantryman" that was used in the 1880s by many American towns, to commemorate those who served in the Civil War.

In the late 1800s, the company sold two versions of a Civil War soldier memorial, with nearly identical designs. The Union model had "U.S." (United States) on the belt buckle, while the Confederate model had "C.S." (Confederate States).

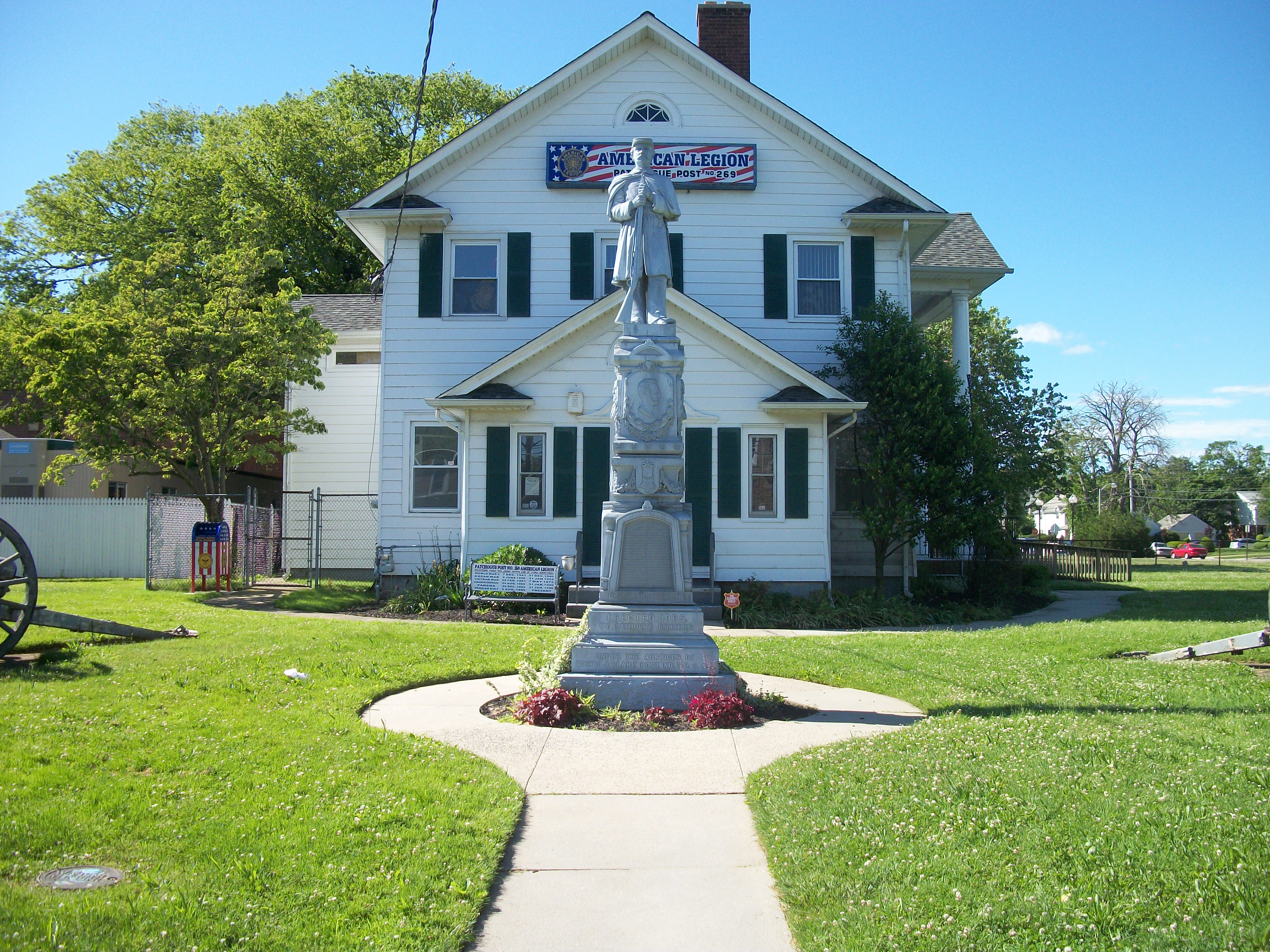
Civil War Soldiers monument in White Bronze, 1885, Patchogue, New York

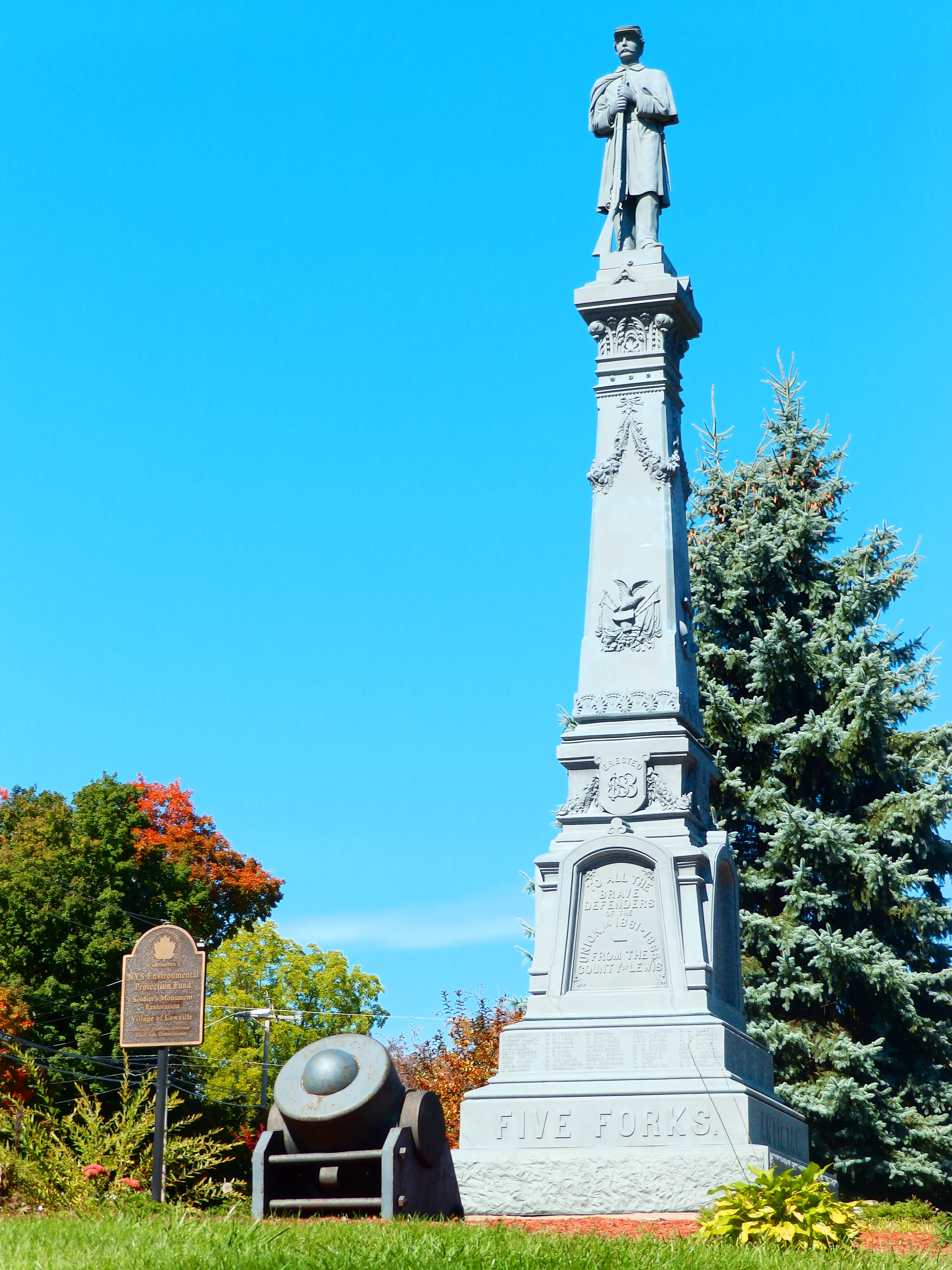
Lewis County Soldiers' and Sailors' Monument, 1883, Lowville, New York

== See also ==
- J. L. Mott Iron Works
- J. W. Fiske & Company
