= White bronze =

Alloy

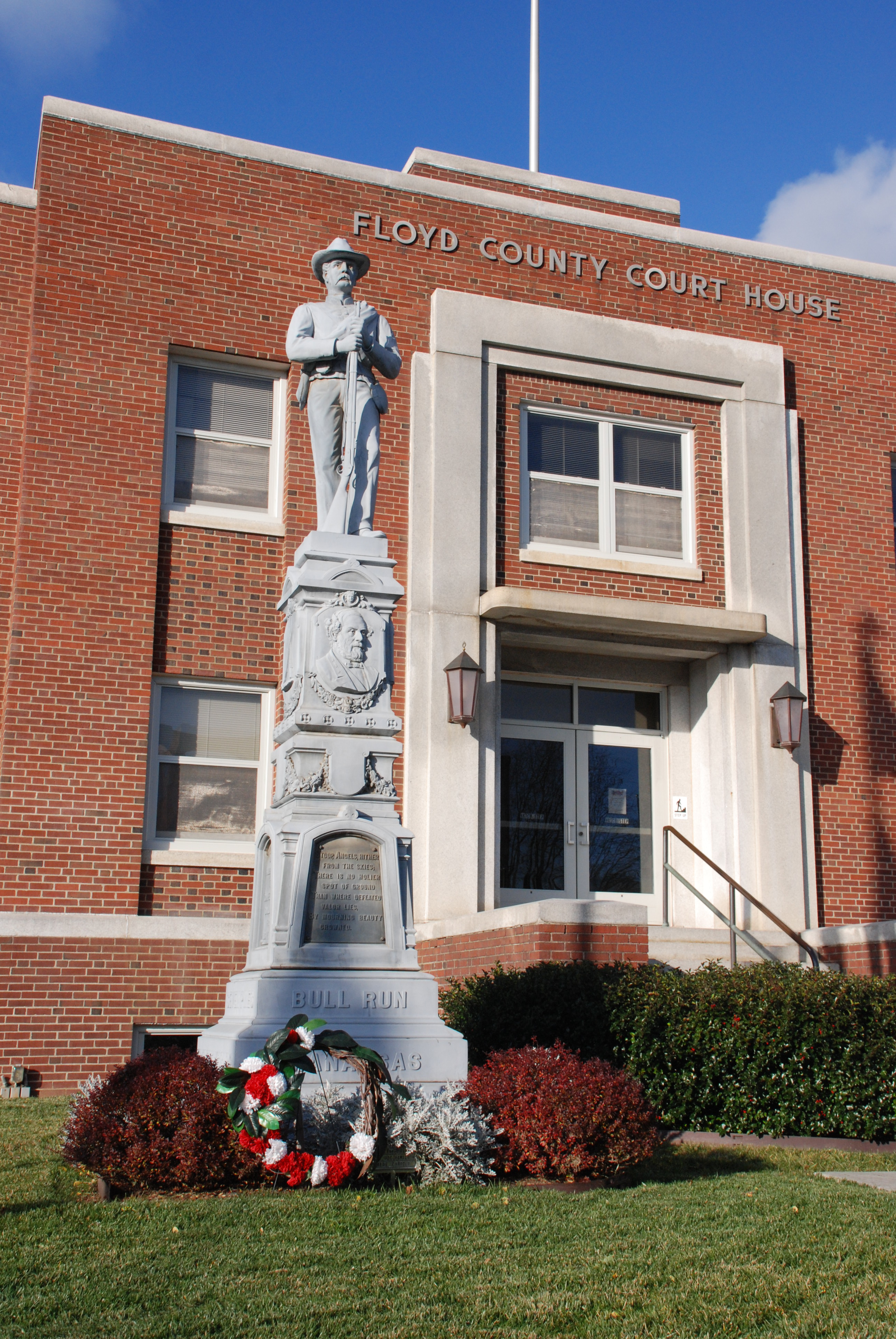
Confederate monument made of white bronze in Floyd, Virginia

White bronze is a white-coloured alloy. Examples include various alloys composed of copper, tin and zinc or composed of zinc, copper, aluminum and magnesium. A modern composition contains 55% copper, 30% tin and 15% zinc. A 1904 patent for "white bronze" is composed of 86% zinc, 9.9% copper, 4% aluminum and 0.1% magnesium.

== History ==
=== Use in monuments ===
In the United States, starting in the 1870s, white bronze was a material used in monuments, particularly gravestones. White bronze gravestones are most common in East Coast cemeteries, but can be found throughout the country. White bronze was also commonly used in Civil War memorials. White bronze monuments could be mass produced, providing a more affordable alternative to more traditional materials like bronze, marble, and granite. Northern manufacturers, like the Monumental Bronze Company in Bridgeport, Connecticut, and the National Fine Art Foundry in New York City, often produced both Union monuments for Northern communities and Confederate monuments for Southern communities. Southern communities tended to be less forthcoming about the Northern origins of the statues. The monuments in the different parts of the country were often very similarly designed, with only minuscule details such as the letters on belt buckles differentiating them. The durability and longevity of the monuments made from this material was advertised by manufacturers; however, they were particularly weak around the seams. The demand for white bronze monuments declined after World War I.
