= New Ulm Oil Company Service Station =

- U.S. National Register of Historic Places
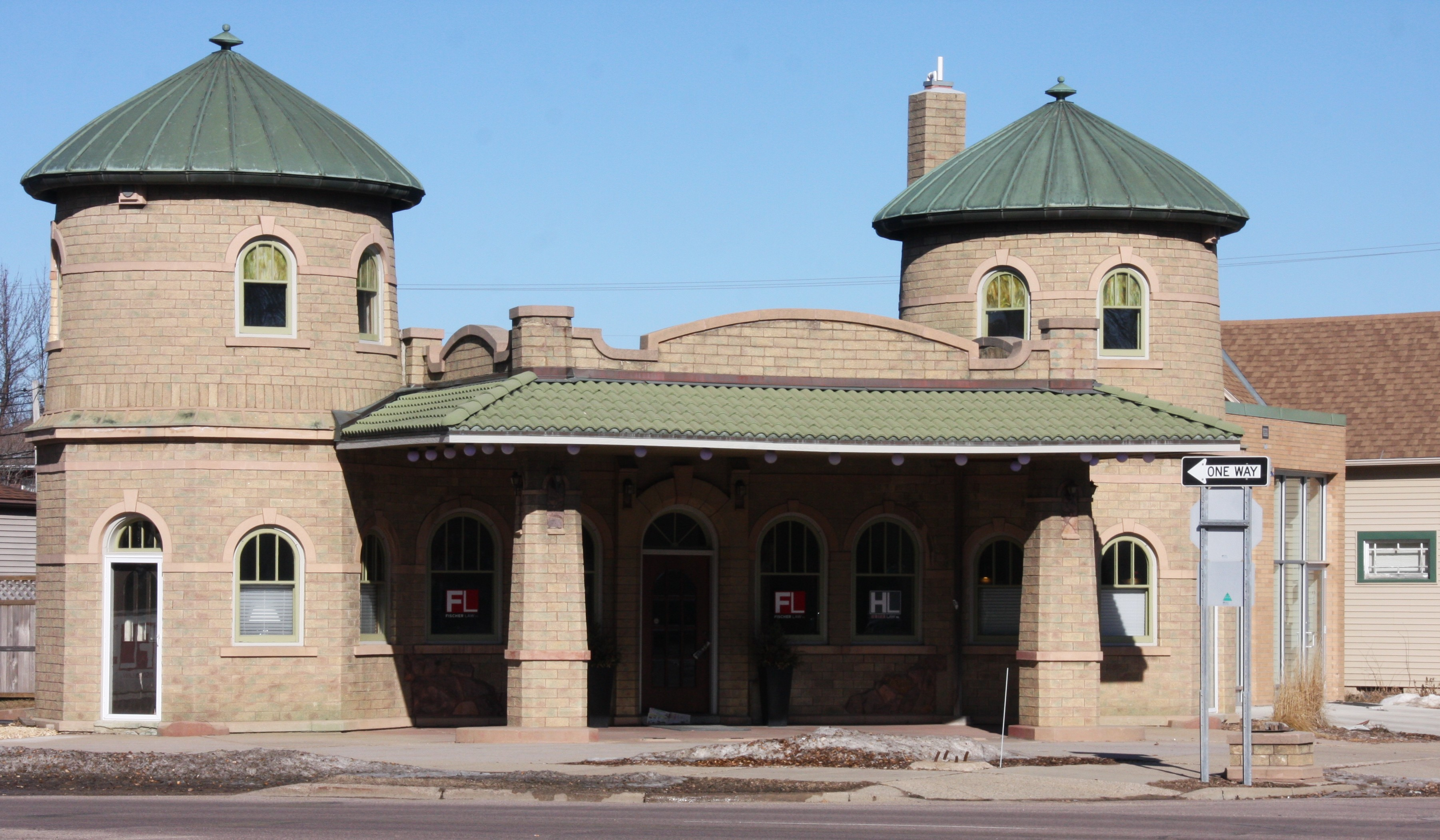

- Location within Minnesota Location within the United States
- Location: Broadway and Fifth Street, New Ulm, Minnesota
- Coordinates: 44°19′4″N 94°27′54″W
- Area: less than one acre
- Built: 1926
- Architect: George Saffert
- MPS: Brown County MRA
- NRHP reference No.: 79001206
- Added to NRHP: December 31, 1979

The New Ulm Oil Company Service Station is a historic gas station in New Ulm, Minnesota. The private, commercial structure was placed on the National Register of Historic Places (NRHP) on December 31, 1979. Its strong, fanciful visual images exemplify independent gas station designs of the 1920s.

== Structure ==
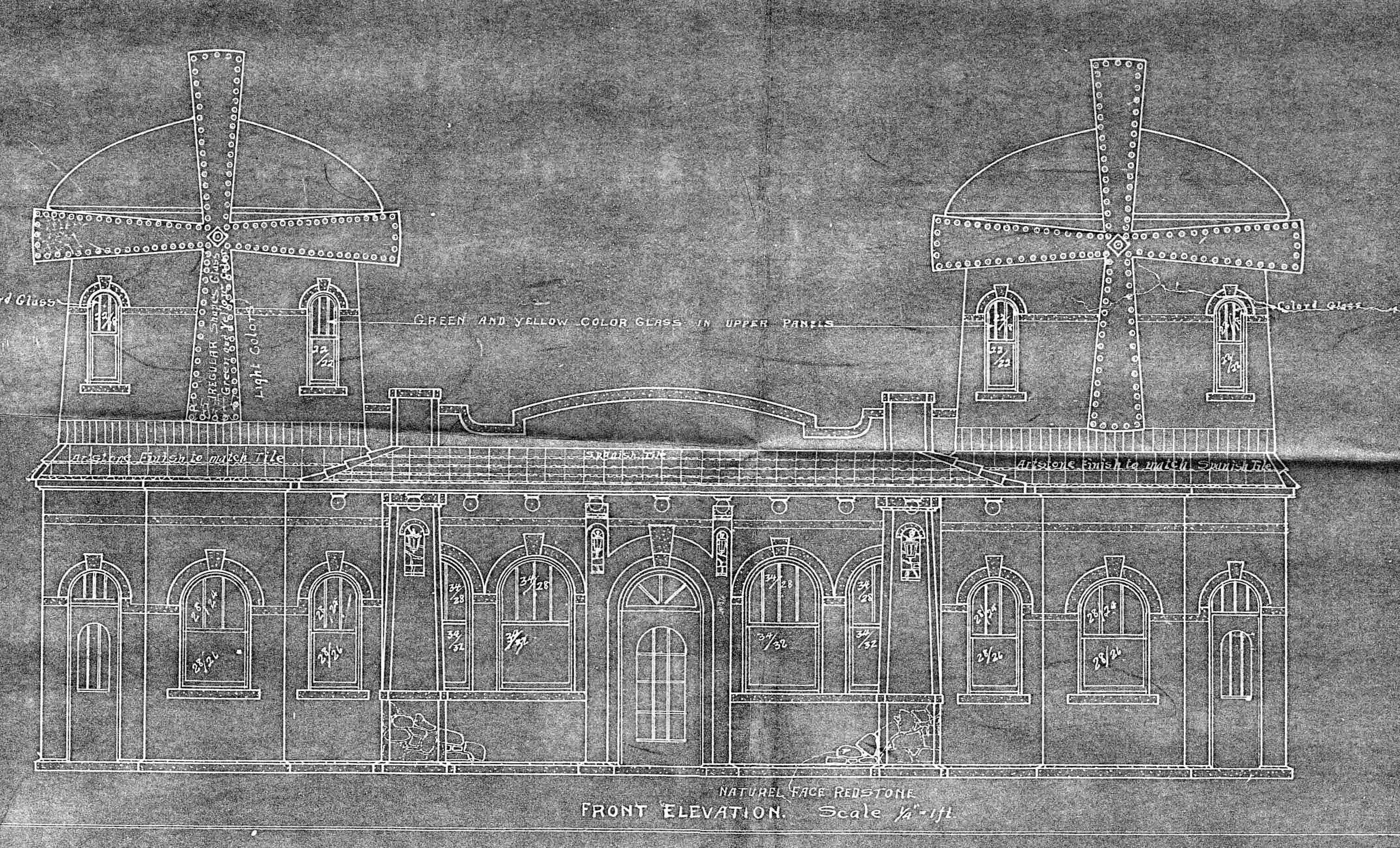
This original architectural elevation shows the decorative windmill blades originally intended for each tower.

The Service Station is built on a diagonal axis facing the intersection of North Broadway Street and North 5th Street in New Ulm. The main facade is flanked by two imposing, copper-roofed towers, octagonal at the first level and circular at the second. A one-story office/retail area is located between the two towers, and from it projects a single-lane drive-through canopy with the gas pump area at the front. The upper sides of the canopy are capped by a parapet with a curvilinear profile. The fenestration consists of arched window and door openings under the canopy and on the two towers; all are capped by precast concrete units which join to form a decorative belt course. The entire structure is built of the rainbow Artstone block manufactured by the company that designed the building.

The building was originally designed with windmill blades at the top of each tower, but they were never installed. Over the life of the building some reversible modifications were made: the red tile roof of the canopy was replaced with asphalt shingle and a wooden screen was added to the front of the canopy. In the years after being listed on the NRHP, the wooden screen and gas pumps were removed.

== Significance ==
The Service Station was a part of the boom of gas stations built throughout the country during the 1920s, corresponding with the years of expanding automobile use; the era was one of crucial development for a rural county like Brown County. The gas station was one of a series of stations designed by the Saffert Construction Company (now American Artstone Company) of New Ulm during the 1920s. These stations projected strong, fanciful design, incorporating features such as windmills and lighthouses. Differing from the standardized plans adopted by national chains, these stations were custom-designed for specific locations belonging to independent oil companies. The New Ulm Oil Company Service Station is one of two known to survive with a high degree of historic integrity.
