= Hermann Heights Monument =

- Hermann Monument
- U.S. National Register of Historic Places
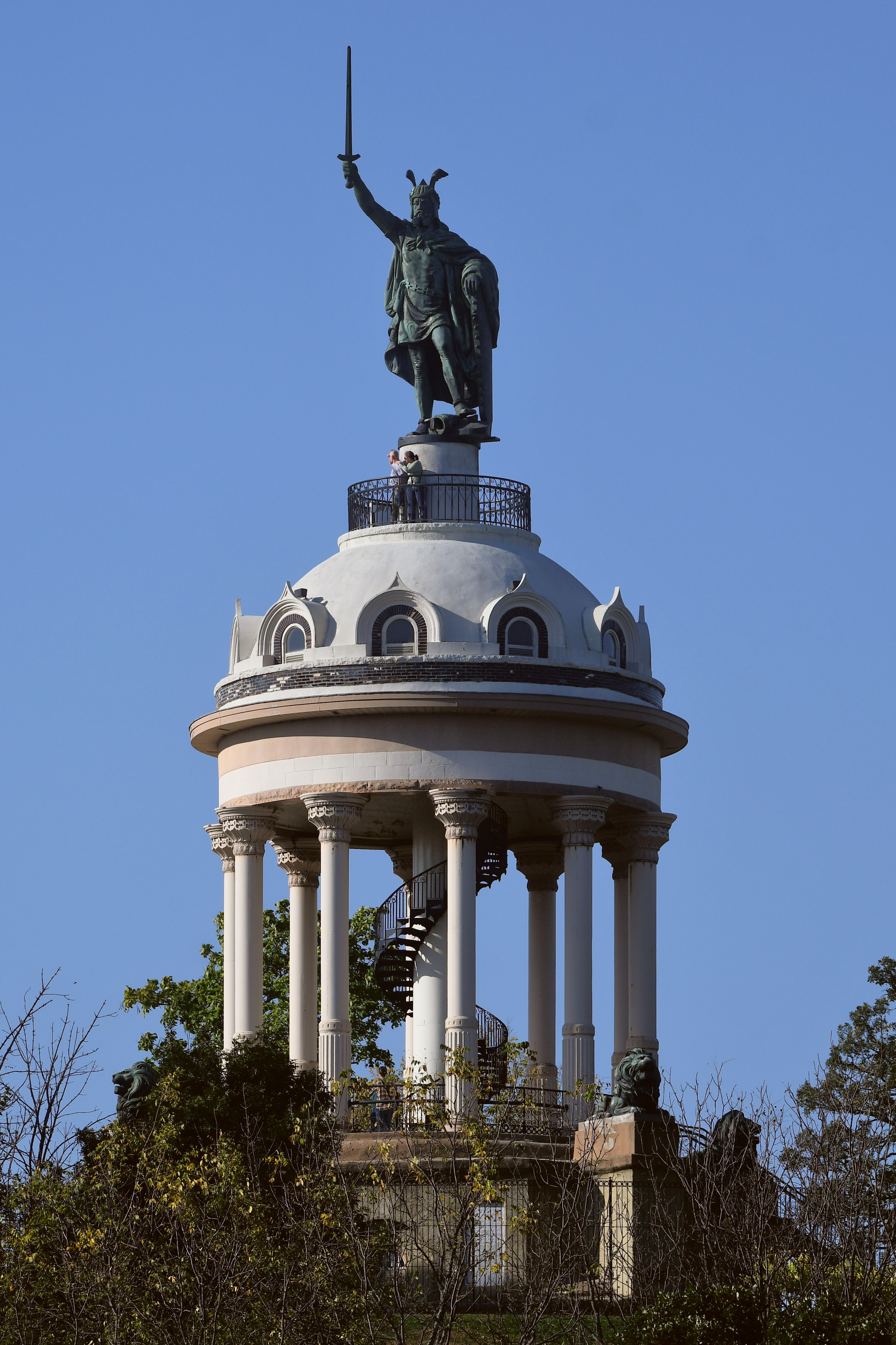
- Hermann Heights Monument in 2024

- Location within Minnesota Location within the United States
- Location: Hermann Heights Park, New Ulm, Minnesota
- Coordinates: 44°18′25.52″N 94°28′21.47″W
- Built: 1888–1897
- Architect: Julius Berndt
- Sculptor: Alfonz Pelzer
- NRHP reference No.: 73000965
- Added to NRHP: October 2, 1973

The Hermann Heights Monument is a statue erected in New Ulm, Minnesota, United States. The statue depicts Arminius (German: Hermann), an ancient Cheruscan, but locals refer to the statue as Hermann the German. The only National Register of Historic Places property of its kind in Minnesota, the monument is a remembrance of the German ancestry of many Minnesotans. Visitors to the statue can climb the spiral staircase to an observation platform at the base of the statue, which commands a view of the town and the Minnesota River Valley below.

== Significance ==
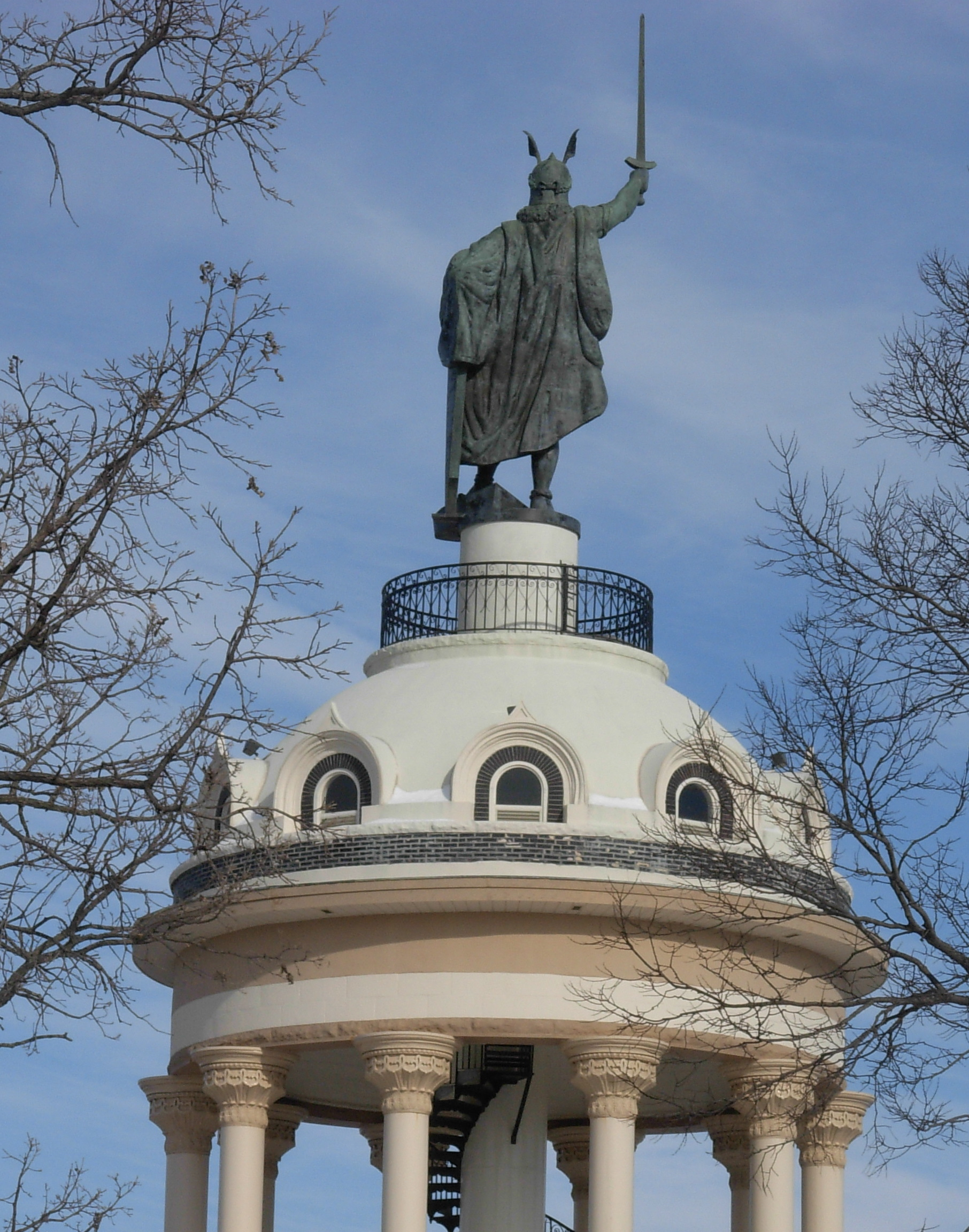
The monument rises above New Ulm

This statue commemorates the German victory over the Romans at the Battle of the Teutoburg Forest, a symbol of German patriotism.

While Arminius had been known in Germany since the rediscovery of the writings of Tacitus in the 15th century, German Protestant intellectuals in the first half of the 18th century christened him "Hermann Deutsch" and promoted his status from that of a local tribal leader with family ties to Rome to that of a hero of Alemmani resistance to "Roman" (i.e. Papal) authority; the 19th century added another layer of meaning, namely Pan-German unity and resistance to Revolutionary France and her language. As depicted in this statue, Hermann's eastward gaze and upraised sword signify freedom from Rome. Perhaps not coincidentally, a statue of St. Paul atop the nearby Roman Catholic Cathedral of the Holy Trinity also gazes eastward, with his sword point-down, planted firmly in the ground.

== Characteristics ==
The Hermann Monument has a total height of approximately 102 feet (31 m). Constructed of sheet copper molded over iron, the 27 feet (8.2 m) statue stands on a 70 feet (21 m) iron column encircled by a spiral staircase to the dome, which is supported by 10 iron columns and a Kasota stone base.

== History ==
Following the completion of the similarly commemorative Hermannsdenkmal statue in Detmold, Germany, in 1875, the Germanic-American fraternal order of the Sons of Hermann, under the leadership of Julius Berndt, who headed the New Ulm chapter and was then national secretary of the order, paid for the erection of the American monument. Berndt designed the monument setting, for which the cornerstone was laid in 1888. The statue was created by Alfonz Pelzer of the W. H. Mullins Manufacturing Company in Salem, Ohio and shipped to New Ulm. It arrived in 1890 and was dedicated in 1897. Structural and cosmetic restoration projects were carried out in 1998 and again in 2004.

The Hermann Heights Monument was added to the National Register of Historic Places in 1973. It is the third largest copper statue in the United States after the Statue of Liberty and Portlandia in Portland, Oregon.

The 106th United States Congress (2000) designated the Hermann Monument in New Ulm to be a symbol of all citizens of Germanic heritage.

== In popular culture ==
The legend of Hermann the German inspired a stage play, Hermann the German: The Scandal that Rocked New Ulm!. Co-written by Minneapolis comic Bill Young, the play was a comedy based on the real-life attempt by the city of New Ulm to boost tourism by creating a fictitious legend about a giant cement footprint supposedly made by the legendary Hermann. The play was first staged as part of the 2014 Minnesota Fringe Festival, then ran at the New Ulm Actors Community Theatre later that year.

== Gallery ==
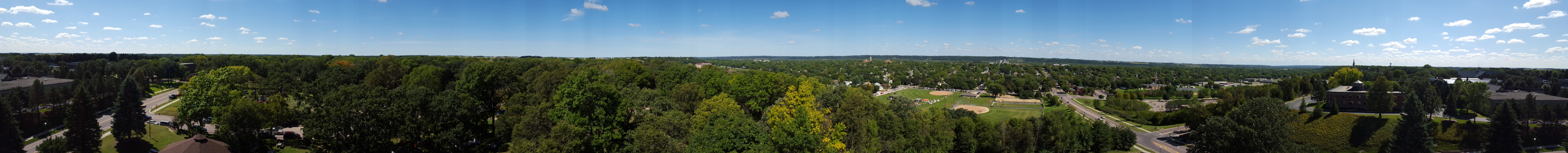
Panoramic view from the top of the Hermann Heights Monument
