= Mullins of Salem, Ohio =

Mullins of Salem, Ohio, was the most well-known American zinc ornament producer in the late nineteenth century. The foundry was in Salem, Ohio and was one of many American companies in the 1880s that through their catalogs sold ornaments nationwide, such as “urns, eagles, civic ornaments, architectural details, and even cigar store Indians.” They did not purvey grave markers, which were the sole domain of the Monumental Bronze Company of Bridgeport, Connecticut.
