= Hanska, Minnesota =

City in Minnesota, United States

Hanska
- City
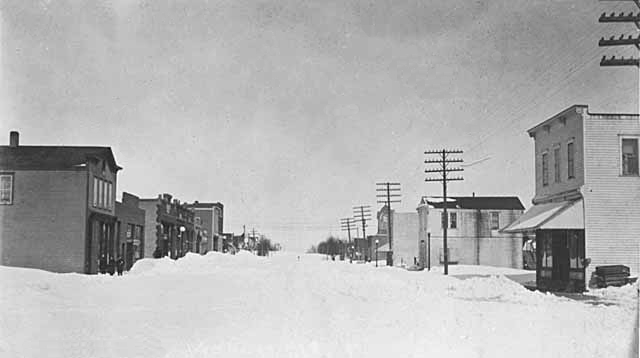
- Hanska, 1917

- Location of Hanska, Minnesota
- Coordinates: 44°08′55″N 94°29′40″W
- Country: United States
- State: Minnesota
- County: Brown

Government
  - Type: Mayor - Council
  - Mayor: Daniel J Vee

Area
  - Total: 0.25 sq mi (0.64 km^{2})
  - Land: 0.25 sq mi (0.64 km^{2})
  - Water: 0 sq mi (0.00 km^{2})
- Elevation: 1,020 ft (310 m)

Population (2020)
  - Total: 382
  - Density: 1,548.9/sq mi (598.03/km^{2})
- Time zone: UTC−6 (Central (CST))
  - Summer (DST): UTC−5 (CDT)
- ZIP Code: 56041
- Area code: 507
- FIPS code: 27-27008
- GNIS feature ID: 2394291
- Website: www.cityofhanska.com

Hanska is a city in Brown County, Minnesota, United States. As of the 2020 census, Hanska had a population of 382.

== History ==
A post office called Hanska has been in operation since 1890. Hanska was platted in 1899, and incorporated as a village in 1901.

== Geography ==
According to the United States Census Bureau, the city has a total area of 0.24 square miles (0.62 km^{2}), all land.

== Demographics ==
Historical population
Census	Pop.	Note	%±
1910	310		—
1920	412		32.9%
1930	359		−12.9%
1940	461		28.4%
1950	473		2.6%
1960	491		3.8%
1970	442		−10.0%
1980	429		−2.9%
1990	443		3.3%
2000	443		0.0%
2010	402		−9.3%
2020	382		−5.0%
U.S. Decennial Census

=== 2010 census ===
As of the census of 2010, there were 402 people, 176 households, and 105 families living in the city. The population density was 1,675.0 inhabitants per square mile (646.7/km^{2}). There were 197 housing units at an average density of 820.8 per square mile (316.9/km^{2}). The racial makeup of the city was 99.5% White, 0.2% African American, and 0.2% Asian. Hispanic or Latino of any race were 0.5% of the population.

There were 176 households, of which 31.3% had children under the age of 18 living with them, 46.0% were married couples living together, 7.4% had a female householder with no husband present, 6.3% had a male householder with no wife present, and 40.3% were non-families. Of all households, 35.8% were made up of individuals, and 12.5% had someone living alone who was 65 years of age or older. The average household size was 2.28 and the average family size was 2.98.

The median age in the city was 38.3 years. 24.9% of residents were under the age of 18; 6.5% were between the ages of 18 and 24; 30.1% were from 25 to 44; 23% were from 45 to 64; and 15.7% were 65 years of age or older. The gender makeup of the city was 51.7% male and 48.3% female.

=== 2000 census ===
As of the census of 2000, there were 443 people, 187 households, and 123 families living in the city. The population density was 1,856.5 inhabitants per square mile (716.8/km^{2}). There were 196 housing units at an average density of 821.4 per square mile (317.1/km^{2}). The racial makeup of the city was 99.10% White, 0.45% African American, 0.23% Native American and 0.23% Asian. Hispanic or Latino of any race were 0.23% of the population.

There were 187 households, out of which 31.6% had children under the age of 18 living with them, 55.6% were married couples living together, 3.2% had a female householder with no husband present, and 34.2% were non-families. Of all households, 28.3% were made up of individuals, and 16.0% had someone living alone who was 65 years of age or older. The average household size was 2.37 and the average family size was 2.92.

In the city, the population was spread out, with 24.6% under the age of 18, 9.0% from 18 to 24, 28.0% from 25 to 44, 21.4% from 45 to 64, and 16.9% who were 65 years of age or older. The median age was 35 years. For every 100 females, there were 103.2 males. For every 100 females age 18 and over, there were 103.7 males.

The median income for a household in the city was $40,114, and the median income for a family was $43,125. Males had a median income of $29,423 versus $18,611 for females. The per capita income for the city was $16,803. About 3.7% of families and 3.1% of the population were below the poverty line, including 1.9% of those under age 18 and 9.8% of those age 65 or over.
