= Sons of Hermann =

German-American mutual aid society

- Hermannssöhne (German)
- Named after: Hermann
- Established: July 20, 1840 (186 years ago)
- Founded at: New York, New York
- Type: Mutual aid society
- Region served: United States
- Website: hermannsonslife.org sonsofherman.com

The Order of the Sons of Hermann (German: Orden der Hermannssöhne) is a mutual aid society for German immigrants that was formed in New York City on July 20, 1840, and remains active in Connecticut, California, Ohio, and Texas today. Now open to members of any heritage, the order provides low-cost insurance and mutual aid and has historically promoted the preservation of the German language and traditions.

The organization is named for Hermann the Cherusker, also known as Arminius, a German hero who overthrew his people's Roman oppressors.

== History ==
An emblem commonly used by the society in the early 20th century depicted Hermann (Arminius) with his sword aloft; other common symbols that were used included German oaks and beehives.

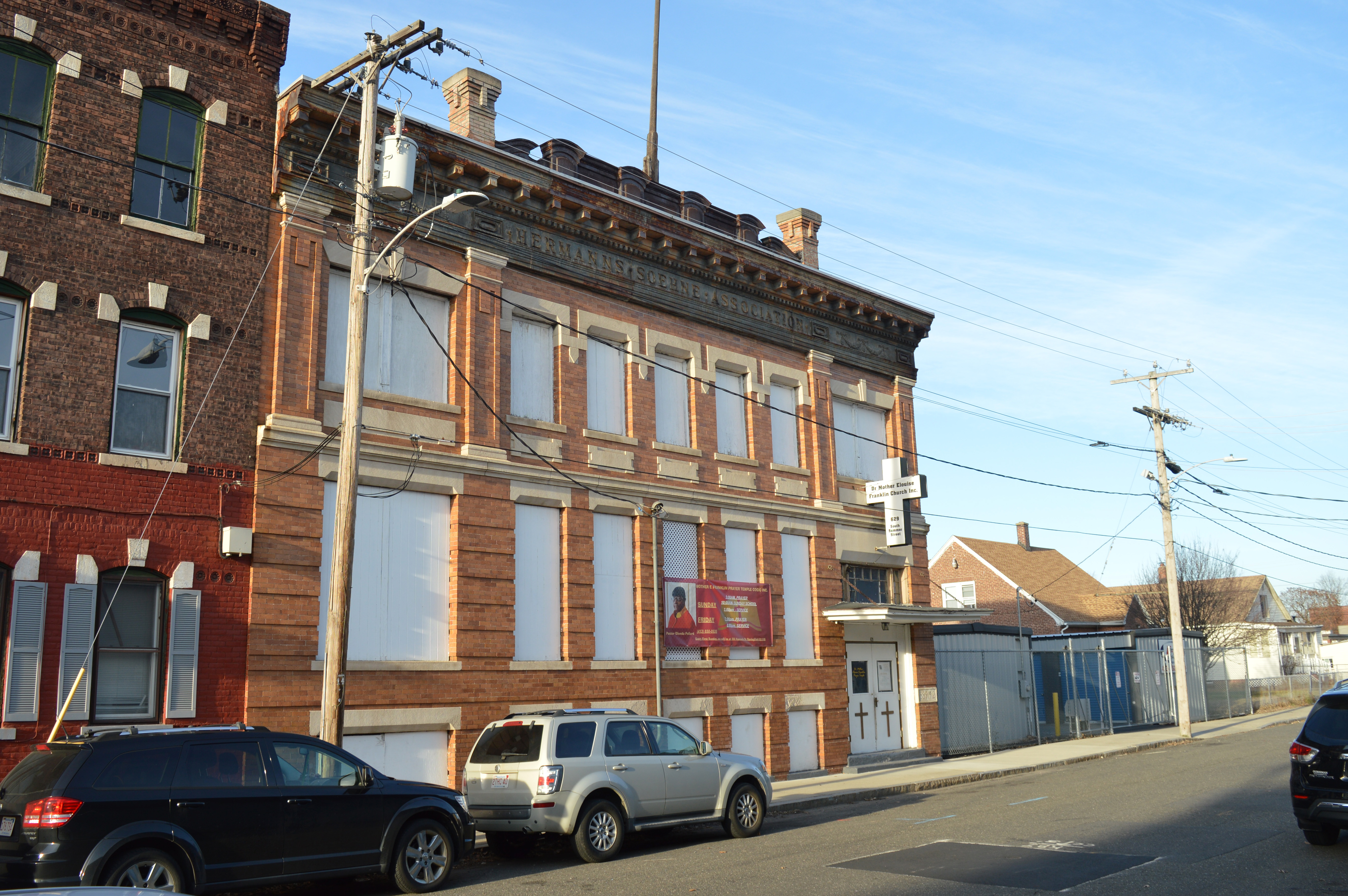
A former meeting hall of the Sons of Hermann built in 1912, and subsequently converted to a church, in South Holyoke, Massachusetts

The Sons of Hermann society was formed by Dr. Philip Merkel, George Heiner, John Blatz, A. Auer, R. Schwendel, W. Kohler, and Philipp Germann on the Lower East Side, in response to anti-German sentiment during a period of heavy German immigration to the United States. One account, published in the St. Paul Morning Call in 1896, is that the order was founded after the funeral procession for a German was hindered and the mourners insulted by nativists, prompting protest meetings of German Americans, at one of which a speaker said another Hermann (Arminius) was needed to protect the Germans from their enemies. It was an offshoot of the Odd Fellows. By 1848, the organization had grown to six groups with 800 members, and on December 25, 1848, a national grand lodge was formed in Milwaukee. Hundreds of lodges were organized during the nineteenth century; by 1895 there were about 30,000 members, and in 1896 there were Grand Lodges in California, Connecticut, Colorado, Illinois, Kansas, Massachusetts, Michigan, Minnesota, Missouri, New Jersey, Ohio, Pennsylvania, Texas and Washington in addition to New York, as well as scattered members in 15 other states with a total membership of 90,000. A German-language account ten years after that mentions affiliates in Canada and in Germany itself. However, renewed anti-German sentiment with the outbreak of World War I led to the order's sharp decline.

German Jews participated fully in the Sons of Hermann; the order's insurance fund was led by Jacob Brandeis and Rabbi Emanuel Gerechter, the former also directing the order's choral group in Milwaukee. At one point the order had a female auxiliary called the Daughters of Hermann, open to the wives, mothers, sisters, and daughters of the Sons.

Harmonia Lodge No. 1 in San Antonio was the first Sons of Hermann lodge to offer its members nonprofit life insurance (proposed in 1873). Starting on July 1, 1875, the national organization required members to purchase a life insurance policy. This is now a major feature of membership; ritual initiation is not required.

== Ritual and symbolism ==
The order's symbolic colors are black, red, and gold, representing German unity - black for ignorance, prejudice, and indifference; red for the light and enlightenment spread by German culture and the German spirit; and gold for true freedom, at which man arrives through knowledge and labor. The order never had degrees. It has had rituals since its inception; at one point, the Roman Catholic Church refused church burial to members of the Sons of Hermann because of their ritual. By the 1970s, though, neither the initiation rite nor the burial rite was required. The burial rite mentions that the departed is now with the Almighty, but the order does not limit its membership to believers in a supreme being.

== Minnesota ==
=== Hermann Monument, New Ulm, Minnesota ===
Under the leadership of Julius Berndt, then-national secretary, the Sons of Hermann paid for an American monument to Hermann modeled on the Hermannsdenkmal in Germany. It was completed in 1897 and is located in New Ulm, Minnesota, where Berndt was head of the local chapter. Following the First World War, anti-German sentiment remained in America and the local order disbanded thereafter, donating the statue and grounds to the City of New Ulm in 1929.

== Texas ==
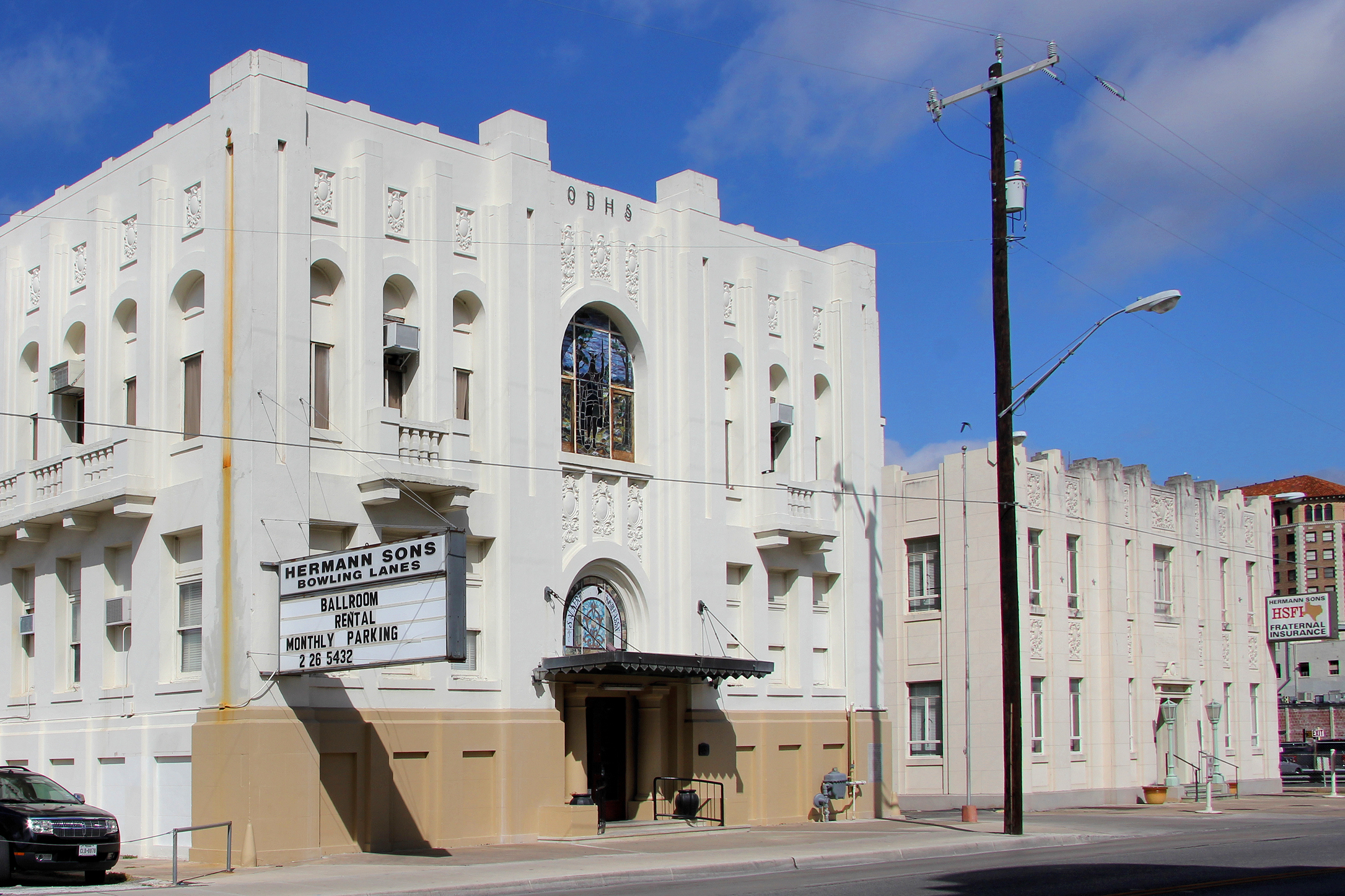
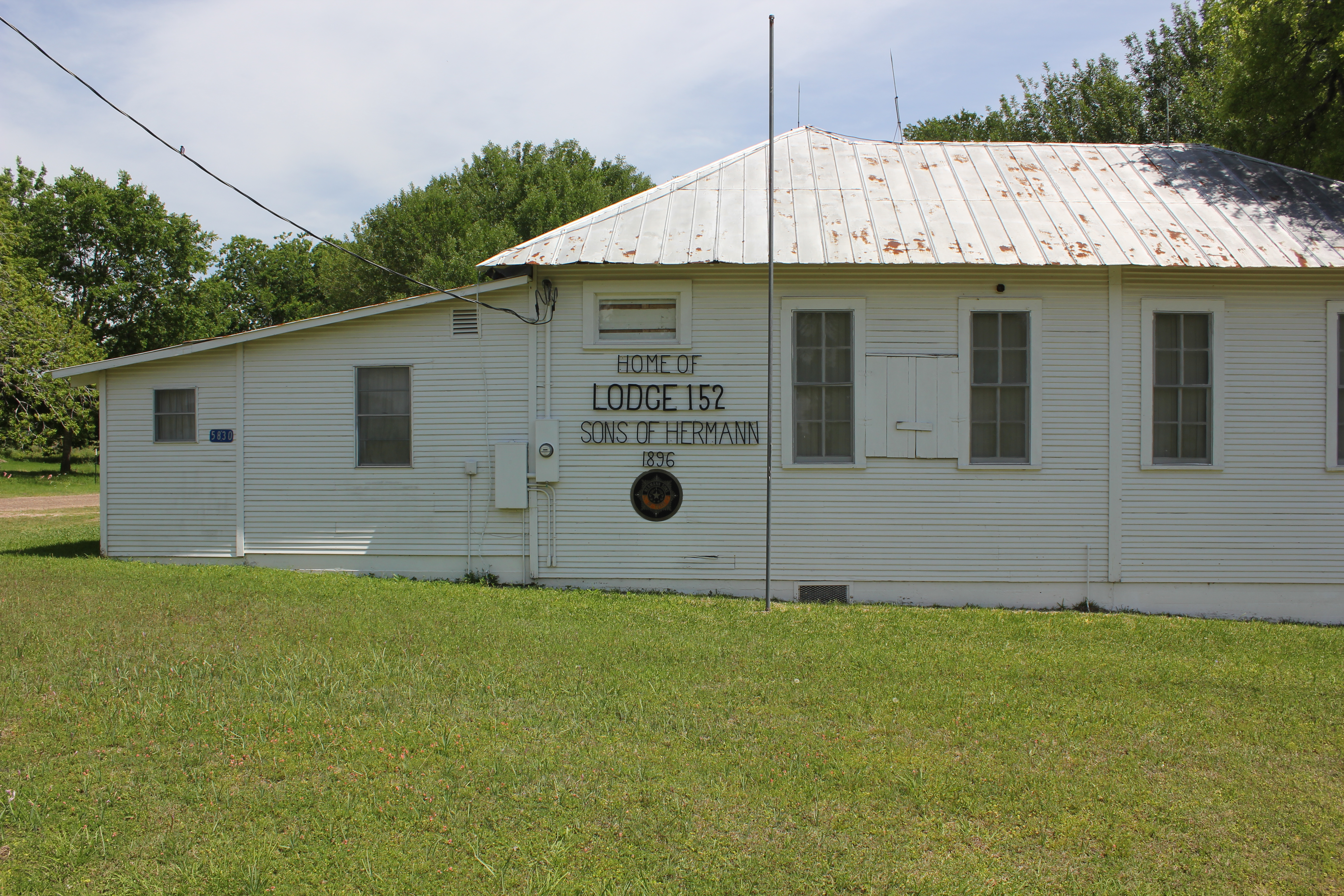
Left to right: The Hermann Sons Lodge in San Antonio, Texas; Lodge 152 in Rutersville, Texas

In 1861, the first lodge in Texas, Harmonia Lodge No. 1, was organized in San Antonio. On March 27, 1890, the Texas Grand Lodge was formed, consisting of Harmonia Lodge of San Antonio and seven other lodges in Austin, Taylor, Temple, Waco, La Grange, Brenham, and Houston, with a combined membership of 242; 92 more lodges were formed in the next year. In 1896, the first sister lodge for women was dedicated in Sherman, and in 1920, the first mixed lodge for both men and women was orgaized in San Antonio. In 1920, the Order of the Sons of Hermann in Texas, which by then was wealthier and had more members than all other Hermann lodges elsewhere in the United States combined, declared itself independent of the national order.

The Texas order phased out the German language (Texas German) in favor of English by 1937. By 1965, only half the membership was of German heritage, and by 1994, membership was open to all. Membership grew as restrictions were lifted.

The Texas order had 80,000 members in 1995, and as of 2008 had more than 74,000 members in more than 140 lodges.

The Texas order has operated a retirement home in Comfort since 1916 and summer youth camps, also on property it owns in Comfort, since 1954. Local lodges offer scholarships to students in their communities.

=== Sons of Hermann Hall, Dallas ===
The Sons of Hermann Hall in Deep Ellum, Dallas, was built in 1910 by the four Dallas lodges and is currently used by two lodges (Columbia Lodge 66 and Dallas Lodge 22), as well as being available for rent. It is a popular venue for the local music scene. A profile of it by Ray Wylie Hubbard appears in Pat Green's Dance Halls & Dreamers.
