= Albin Township, Brown County, Minnesota =

Township in Minnesota, United States

Albin Township
- Township
- Location within the state of Minnesota Albin Township (the United States)
- Coordinates: 44°8′56″N 94°41′8″W
- Country: United States
- State: Minnesota
- County: Brown

Area
  - Total: 35.6 sq mi (92.2 km^{2})
  - Land: 34.4 sq mi (89.0 km^{2})
  - Water: 1.2 sq mi (3.1 km^{2})
- Elevation: 1,040 ft (317 m)

Population (2000)
  - Total: 329
  - Density: 9.6/sq mi (3.7/km^{2})
- Time zone: UTC-6 (Central (CST))
  - Summer (DST): UTC-5 (CDT)
- FIPS code: 27-00748
- GNIS feature ID: 0663404

Albin Township is a township in Brown County, Minnesota, United States. The population was 329 at the 2000 census. Albin Township was organized in 1870.

== Geography ==
According to the United States Census Bureau, the township has a total area of 35.6 square miles (92 km^{2}), of which 34.4 square miles (89 km^{2}) is land and 1.2 square miles (3.1 km^{2}) is water. The total area is 3.40% water.

=== Major highway ===
- Minnesota State Highway 4

=== Lake ===
- Lake Hanska

=== Adjacent townships ===
- Stark Township (north)
- Sigel Township (northeast)
- Lake Hanska Township (east)
- Riverdale Township, Watonwan County (southeast)
- Nelson Township, Watonwan County (south)
- Adrian Township, Watonwan County (southwest)
- Mulligan Township (west)

== Demographics ==
As of the census of 2000, there were 329 people, 126 households, and 99 families residing in the township. The population density was 9.6 people per square mile (3.7/km^{2}). There were 132 housing units at an average density of 3.8/sq mi (1.5/km^{2}). The racial makeup of the township was 97.57% White, 0.30% Asian, and 2.13% from two or more races. Hispanic or Latino of any race were 0.61% of the population.

There were 126 households, out of which 28.6% had children under the age of 18 living with them, 70.6% were married couples living together, 5.6% had a female householder with no husband present, and 21.4% were non-families. 19.8% of all households were made up of individuals, and 7.9% had someone living alone who was 65 years of age or older. The average household size was 2.61 and the average family size was 2.97.

In the township the population was spread out, with 27.7% under the age of 18, 5.5% from 18 to 24, 28.0% from 25 to 44, 21.9% from 45 to 64, and 17.0% who were 65 years of age or older. The median age was 38 years. For every 100 females, there were 106.9 males. For every 100 females age 18 and over, there were 112.5 males.

The median income for a household in the township was $36,111, and the median income for a family was $40,625. Males had a median income of $32,031 versus $23,750 for females. The per capita income for the township was $15,830. About 7.2% of families and 13.7% of the population were below the poverty line, including 21.9% of those under the age of 18 and 8.9% of those 65 and older.
