= Mulligan Township, Brown County, Minnesota =

Township in Minnesota, United States

Mulligan Township
- Township
- Location within the state of Minnesota Mulligan Township (the United States)
- Coordinates: 44°9′28″N 94°48′33″W
- Country: United States
- State: Minnesota
- County: Brown

Area
  - Total: 36.3 sq mi (94.0 km^{2})
  - Land: 35.9 sq mi (92.9 km^{2})
  - Water: 0.39 sq mi (1.0 km^{2})
- Elevation: 1,030 ft (314 m)

Population (2000)
  - Total: 245
  - Density: 6.7/sq mi (2.6/km^{2})
- Time zone: UTC-6 (Central (CST))
  - Summer (DST): UTC-5 (CDT)
- FIPS code: 27-44746
- GNIS feature ID: 0665063

Mulligan Township is a township in Brown County, Minnesota, United States. The population was 245 as of the 2000 census. Mulligan Township was organized in 1871.

== Geography ==
According to the United States Census Bureau, the township has a total area of 36.3 square miles (94.0 km^{2}), of which 35.9 square miles (93.0 km^{2}) is land and 0.4 square miles (1.0 km^{2}) (1.10%) is water.

=== Lakes ===
- Altermatt Lake (southeast edge)
- Wood Lake

=== Adjacent townships ===
- Leavenworth Township (north)
- Stark Township (northeast)
- Albin Township (east)
- Nelson Township, Watonwan County (southeast)
- Adrian Township, Watonwan County (south)
- Selma Township, Cottonwood County (southwest)
- Bashaw Township (west)

=== Cemetery ===
The township contains Salem Cemetery.

== Demographics ==
As of the census of 2000, there were 245 people, 93 households, and 70 families residing in the township. The population density was 6.8 people per square mile (2.6/km^{2}). There were 101 housing units at an average density of 2.8/sq mi (1.1/km^{2}). The racial makeup of the township was 98.78% White, 1.22% from other races. Hispanic or Latino of any race were 1.22% of the population.

There were 93 households, out of which 29.0% had children under the age of 18 living with them, 68.8% were married couples living together, 2.2% had a female householder with no husband present, and 24.7% were non-families. 21.5% of all households were made up of individuals, and 10.8% had someone living alone who was 65 years of age or older. The average household size was 2.63 and the average family size was 3.07.

In the township the population was spread out, with 26.5% under the age of 18, 4.9% from 18 to 24, 24.9% from 25 to 44, 26.1% from 45 to 64, and 17.6% who were 65 years of age or older. The median age was 42 years. For every 100 females, there were 120.7 males. For every 100 females age 18 and over, there were 116.9 males.

The median income for a household in the township was $37,188, and the median income for a family was $41,250. Males had a median income of $31,250 versus $20,000 for females. The per capita income for the township was $15,939. About 13.2% of families and 10.9% of the population were below the poverty line, including 7.1% of those under the age of eighteen and 25.0% of those 65 or over.
