= Linden Township, Brown County, Minnesota =

Township in Minnesota, United States

Linden Township
- Township
- Location within the state of Minnesota Linden Township (the United States)
- Coordinates: 44°9′17″N 94°25′18″W
- Country: United States
- State: Minnesota
- County: Brown

Area
  - Total: 36.0 sq mi (93.3 km^{2})
  - Land: 35.2 sq mi (91.1 km^{2})
  - Water: 0.85 sq mi (2.2 km^{2})
- Elevation: 1,010 ft (308 m)

Population (2000)
  - Total: 343
  - Density: 9.8/sq mi (3.8/km^{2})
- Time zone: UTC-6 (Central (CST))
  - Summer (DST): UTC-5 (CDT)
- FIPS code: 27-37214
- GNIS feature ID: 0664788

Linden Township is a township in Brown County, Minnesota, United States. The population was 343 as of the 2000 census.

== History ==
Linden Township was organized in 1859, and named for the linden trees contained within its borders.

== Geography ==
According to the United States Census Bureau, the township has a total area of 36.0 square miles (93.3 km^{2}), of which 35.2 square miles (91.1 km^{2}) is land and 0.8 square miles (2.2 km^{2}) (2.33%) is water.

=== Unincorporated community ===
- Linden at 44.181351°N 94.409412°W

=== Major highway ===
- Minnesota State Highway 15

=== Lakes ===
- Emerson Lake (drained)
- Linden Lake
- Dane Lake (drained)

=== Adjacent townships ===
- Cottonwood Township (north)
- Cambria Township, Blue Earth County (northeast)
- Butternut Valley Township, Blue Earth County (east)
- Madelia Township, Watonwan County (south)
- Riverdale Township, Watonwan County (southwest)
- Lake Hanska Township (west)

=== Cemeteries ===
The township includes the following cemeteries: Linden, Mount Pisgah and Rice Lake.

== Demographics ==
As of the census of 2000, there were 343 people, 122 households, and 101 families residing in the township. The population density was 9.7 people per square mile (3.8/km^{2}). There were 124 housing units at an average density of 3.5/sq mi (1.4/km^{2}). The racial makeup of the township was 99.42% White, 0.58% from other races. Hispanic or Latino of any race were 1.46% of the population.

There were 122 households, out of which 32.8% had children under the age of 18 living with them, 70.5% were married couples living together, 4.9% had a female householder with no husband present, and 17.2% were non-families. 14.8% of all households were made up of individuals, and 7.4% had someone living alone who was 65 years of age or older. The average household size was 2.81 and the average family size was 3.12.

In the township the population was spread out, with 26.8% under the age of 18, 8.2% from 18 to 24, 28.3% from 25 to 44, 23.0% from 45 to 64, and 13.7% who were 65 years of age or older. The median age was 38 years. For every 100 females, there were 114.4 males. For every 100 females age 18 and over, there were 132.4 males.

The median income for a household in the township was $63,125, and the median income for a family was $66,875. Males had a median income of $35,000 versus $28,750 for females. The per capita income for the township was $22,939. None of the families and 1.2% of the population were living below the poverty line, including no under eighteens and 4.5% of those over 64.
