= Cottonwood Township, Brown County, Minnesota =

Township in Minnesota, United States

Cottonwood township
- Township
- Location within the state of Minnesota Cottonwood township (the United States)
- Coordinates: 44°15′48″N 94°25′57″W
- Country: United States
- State: Minnesota
- County: Brown

Area
  - Total: 35.4 sq mi (91.7 km^{2})
  - Land: 35.4 sq mi (91.6 km^{2})
  - Water: 0.039 sq mi (0.1 km^{2})
- Elevation: 978 ft (298 m)

Population (2000)
  - Total: 938
  - Density: 26/sq mi (10.2/km^{2})
- Time zone: UTC-6 (Central (CST))
  - Summer (DST): UTC-5 (CDT)
- FIPS code: 27-13546
- GNIS feature ID: 0663881

Cottonwood Township is a township in Brown County, Minnesota, United States. The population was 938 as of the 2000 census.

== History ==
Cottonwood Township was organized in 1858. The township took its name from the Cottonwood River.

== Geography ==
According to the United States Census Bureau, the township has a total area of 35.4 square miles (92 km^{2}), of which 35.4 square miles (92 km^{2}) is land and 0.04 square miles (0.10 km^{2}) (0.08%) is water. The Minnesota River flows along the township's northeast boundary; its tributaries, the Cottonwood and Little Cottonwood Rivers, also flow through the township.

The south quarter of the city of New Ulm is within the township geographically but is a separate entity.

== Lake ==
Clear Lake

=== Unincorporated communities ===
- Searles at 44.228573°N 94.434691°W

=== Major highways ===
- Minnesota State Highway 15
- Minnesota State Highway 68

=== Adjacent townships ===
- Courtland Township, Nicollet County (northeast)
- Cambria Township, Blue Earth County (east)
- Linden Township (south)
- Lake Hanska Township (southwest)
- Sigel Township (west)
- Milford Township (northwest)

=== Cemeteries ===
The township includes the following cemeteries: Cottonwood, Saint Johns and Saint Josephs.

== Demographics ==
As of the census of 2000, there were 938 people, 340 households, and 269 families residing in the township. The population density was 26.5 inhabitants per square mile (10.2/km^{2}). There were 346 housing units at an average density of 9.8/sq mi (3.8/km^{2}). The racial makeup of the township was 99.04% White, 0.85% Asian, and 0.11% from two or more races. Hispanic or Latino of any race were 0.53% of the population.

There were 340 households, out of which 37.1% had children under the age of 18 living with them, 69.4% were married couples living together, 7.6% had a female householder with no husband present, and 20.6% were non-families. 17.9% of all households were made up of individuals, and 6.2% had someone living alone who was 65 years of age or older. The average household size was 2.76 and the average family size was 3.13.

In the township the population was spread out, with 27.9% under the age of 18, 7.8% from 18 to 24, 27.9% from 25 to 44, 24.9% from 45 to 64, and 11.4% who were 65 years of age or older. The median age was 38 years. For every 100 females, there were 108.0 males. For every 100 females age 18 and over, there were 109.3 males.

The median income for a household in the township was $48,750, and the median income for a family was $60,000. Males had a median income of $31,726 versus $24,667 for females. The per capita income for the township was $21,299. About 4.2% of families and 6.9% of the population were below the poverty line, including 9.7% of those under age 18 and 5.2% of those age 65 or over.
