= Lincoln Township, Blue Earth County, Minnesota =

Township in Minnesota, United States

Lincoln Township
- Township
- Location within the state of Minnesota Lincoln Township (the United States)
- Coordinates: 44°3′41″N 94°18′7″W
- Country: United States
- State: Minnesota
- County: Blue Earth

Area
  - Total: 35.9 sq mi (93.1 km^{2})
  - Land: 35.9 sq mi (93.1 km^{2})
  - Water: 0 sq mi (0.0 km^{2})
- Elevation: 991 ft (302 m)

Population (2000)
  - Total: 227
  - Density: 6.2/sq mi (2.4/km^{2})
- Time zone: UTC-6 (Central (CST))
  - Summer (DST): UTC-5 (CDT)
- FIPS code: 27-37124
- GNIS feature ID: 0664785

Lincoln Township is a township in Blue Earth County, Minnesota, United States. The population was 227 as of the 2000 census.

Lincoln Township was named in 1865 for Abraham Lincoln.

== Geography ==
According to the United States Census Bureau, the township has a total area of 36.0 square miles (93 km^{2}), all land.

=== Unincorporated community ===
- Perth at 44.079683°N 94.358852°W

=== Major highway ===
- Minnesota State Highway 60

=== Adjacent townships ===
- Butternut Valley Township (north)
- Judson Township (northeast)
- Garden City Township (east)
- Vernon Center Township (southeast)
- Ceresco Township (south)
- Fieldon Township, Watonwan County (southwest)
- Madelia Township, Watonwan County (west)

=== Cemeteries ===
The township includes the following cemeteries: Lincoln and North Lincoln.

== Demographics ==
As of the census of 2000, there were 227 people, 90 households, and 66 families residing in the township. The population density was 6.3 people per square mile (2.4/km^{2}). There were 94 housing units at an average density of 2.6/sq mi (1.0/km^{2}). The racial makeup of the township was 99.12% White, 0.44% Asian, 0.44% from other races. Hispanic or Latino of any race were 0.44% of the population.

There were 90 households, out of which 29.9% had children under the age of 18 living with them, 67.8% were married couples living together, 3.3% had a female householder with no husband present, and 25.6% were non-families. 24.4% of all households were made up of individuals, and 8.9% had someone living alone who was 65 years of age or older. The average household size was 2.52 and the average family size was 3.00.

In the township the population was spread out, with 26.9% under the age of 18, 2.6% from 18 to 24, 24.2% from 25 to 44, 25.1% from 45 to 64, and 21.1% who were 65 years of age or older. The median age was 42 years. For every 100 females, there were 110.2 males. For every 100 females age 18 and over, there were 110.1 males.

The median income for a household in the township was $43,125, and the median income for a family was $49,688. Males had a median income of $28,750 versus $23,500 for females. The per capita income for the township was $23,559. About 3.5% of families and 5.1% of the population were below the poverty line, including none of those under the age of eighteen and 5.4% of those 65 or over.
