= Ceresco Township, Blue Earth County, Minnesota =

Township in Minnesota, United States

Ceresco Township
- Township
- Location within the state of Minnesota Ceresco Township (the United States)
- Coordinates: 43°57′58″N 94°18′45″W
- Country: United States
- State: Minnesota
- County: Blue Earth

Area
  - Total: 35.9 sq mi (93.0 km^{2})
  - Land: 35.8 sq mi (92.8 km^{2})
  - Water: 0.077 sq mi (0.2 km^{2})
- Elevation: 1,007 ft (307 m)

Population (2000)
  - Total: 255
  - Density: 7.0/sq mi (2.7/km^{2})
- Time zone: UTC-6 (Central (CST))
  - Summer (DST): UTC-5 (CDT)
- FIPS code: 27-10756
- GNIS feature ID: 0663775

Ceresco Township is a township in Blue Earth County, Minnesota, United States. The population was 255 as of the 2000 census.

== History ==
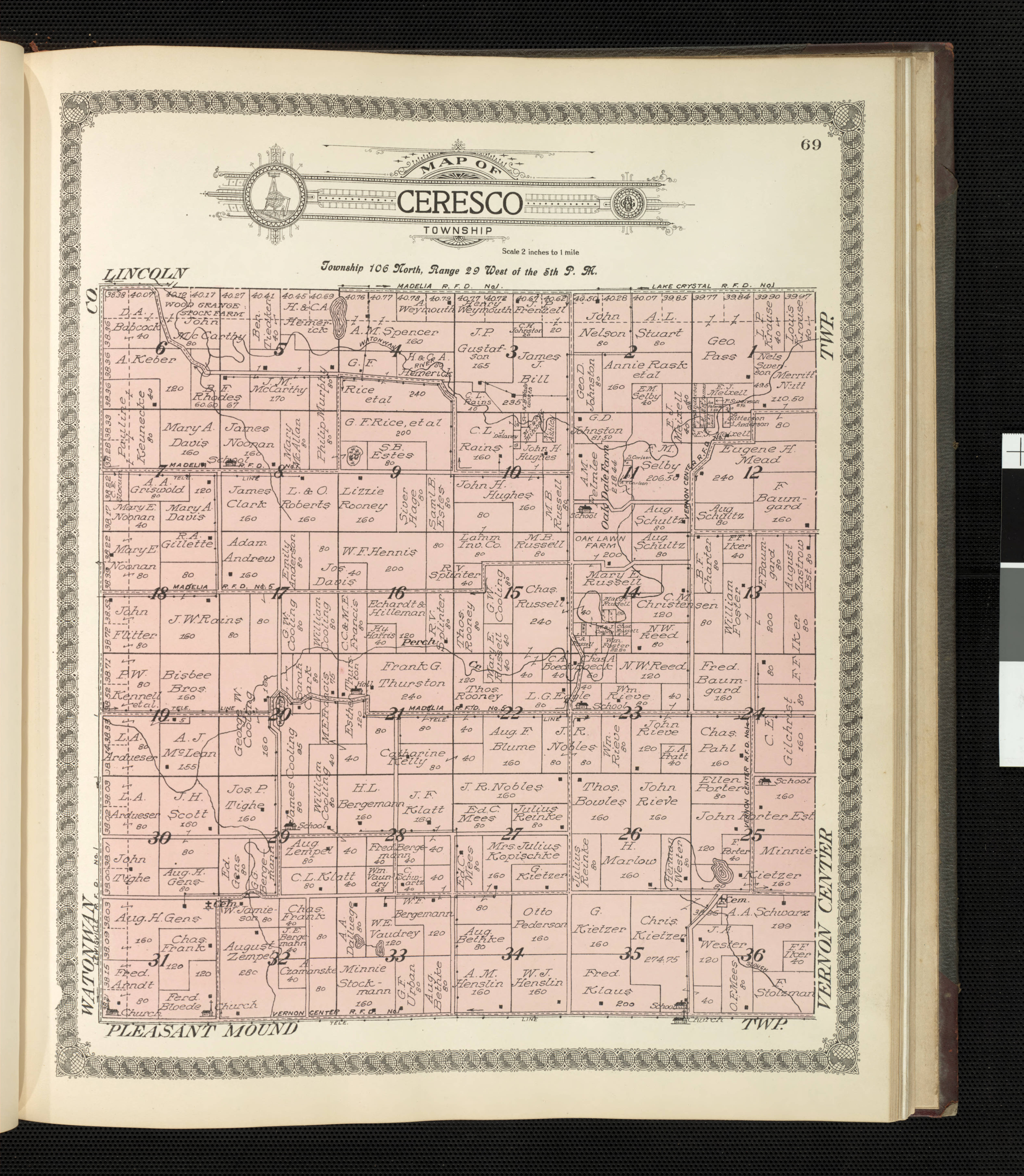
Ceresco Township Plat Map from the Standard Atlas, Blue Earth County, Minnesota

Ceresco Township was organized in 1858, and named after Ceresco, Wisconsin, the former hometown of an early settler.

== Geography ==
According to the United States Census Bureau, the township has a total area of 35.9 square miles (93 km^{2}), of which 35.8 square miles (93 km^{2}) is land and 0.1 square miles (0.26 km^{2}) (0.22%) is water.

=== Lake ===
- Porter Lake

Named for John Porter and his cousin Miles Porter who settled on the eastern and northern shore of this lake in 1857, the surface area of this lake is approximately 25 acres (100,000 m^{2}) and has a surface elevation of approximately 989 feet (301 m) above mean sea level.

=== Adjacent townships ===
- Lincoln Township (north)
- Garden City Township (northeast)
- Vernon Center Township (east)
- Shelby Township (southeast)
- Pleasant Mound Township (south)
- Antrim Township, Watonwan County (southwest)
- Fieldon Township, Watonwan County (west)

=== Cemeteries ===
The township includes the following cemeteries: North Saint Johns and Ohio.

== Demographics ==
As of the census of 2000, there were 255 people, 94 households, and 76 families residing in the township. The population density was 7.1 people per square mile (2.7/km^{2}). There were 102 housing units at an average density of 2.8/sq mi (1.1/km^{2}). The racial makeup of the township was 99.61% White and 0.39% Native American.

There were 94 households, out of which 33.0% had children under the age of 18 living with them, 70.2% were married couples living together, 4.3% had a female householder with no husband present, and 18.1% were non-families. 18.1% of all households were made up of individuals, and 8.5% had someone living alone who was 65 years of age or older. The average household size was 2.71 and the average family size was 3.08.

In the township the population was spread out, with 27.1% under the age of 18, 9.4% from 18 to 24, 16.1% from 25 to 44, 29.4% from 45 to 64, and 18.0% who were 65 years of age or older. The median age was 42 years. For every 100 females, there were 105.6 males. For every 100 females age 18 and over, there were 106.7 males.

The median income for a household in the township was $38,750, and the median income for a family was $45,104. Males had a median income of $27,500 versus $25,750 for females. The per capita income for the township was $15,412. About 5.8% of families and 7.9% of the population were below the poverty line, including 9.1% of those under the age of eighteen and none of those 65 or over.
