= Lake Hanska Township, Brown County, Minnesota =

Township in Minnesota, United States

Lake Hanska Township
- Township
- Location within the state of Minnesota Lake Hanska Township (the United States)
- Coordinates: 44°8′56″N 94°33′6″W
- Country: United States
- State: Minnesota
- County: Brown

Area
  - Total: 38.8 sq mi (100.5 km^{2})
  - Land: 36.7 sq mi (95.1 km^{2})
  - Water: 2.0 sq mi (5.3 km^{2})
- Elevation: 1,007 ft (307 m)

Population (2000)
  - Total: 322
  - Density: 8.8/sq mi (3.4/km^{2})
- Time zone: UTC-6 (Central (CST))
  - Summer (DST): UTC-5 (CDT)
- FIPS code: 27-34442
- GNIS feature ID: 0664678

Lake Hanska Township is a township in Brown County, Minnesota, United States. The population was 322 as of the 2000 census.

== History ==
Lake Hanska Township was organized in 1870.

== Geography ==
According to the United States Census Bureau, the township has a total area of 38.8 square miles (100 km^{2}), of which 36.7 square miles (95 km^{2}) is land and 2.1 square miles (5.4 km^{2}) (5.31%) is water.

The city of Hanska is entirely within the township geographically but is a separate entity.

=== Lake ===
- Omsrud Lake

=== Adjacent townships ===
- Sigel Township (north)
- Cottonwood Township (northeast)
- Linden Township (east)
- Madelia Township, Watonwan County (southeast)
- Riverdale Township, Watonwan County (south)
- Nelson Township, Watonwan County (southwest)
- Albin Township (west)

=== Cemeteries ===
The township includes the following cemeteries: Lake Hanska and Zion.

== Demographics ==
As of the census of 2000, there were 322 people, 124 households, and 91 families residing in the township. The population density was 8.8 people per square mile (3.4/km^{2}). There were 135 housing units at an average density of 3.7/sq mi (1.4/km^{2}). The racial makeup of the township was 98.76% White, 0.62% Asian, 0.31% from other races, and 0.31% from two or more races. Hispanic or Latino of any race were 1.24% of the population.

There were 124 households, out of which 32.3% had children under the age of 18 living with them, 65.3% were married couples living together, 4.0% had a female householder with no husband present, and 26.6% were non-families. 24.2% of all households were made up of individuals, and 7.3% had someone living alone who was 65 years of age or older. The average household size was 2.60 and the average family size was 3.11.

In the township the population was spread out, with 27.3% under the age of 18, 7.1% from 18 to 24, 27.0% from 25 to 44, 23.6% from 45 to 64, and 14.9% who were 65 years of age or older. The median age was 38 years. For every 100 females, there were 113.2 males. For every 100 females age 18 and over, there were 125.0 males.

The median income for a household in the township was $36,786, and the median income for a family was $38,750. Males had a median income of $32,188 versus $21,250 for females. The per capita income for the township was $17,652. None of the families and 1.2% of the population were living below the poverty line, including no under eighteens and none of those over 64.
