= Pleasant Mound Township, Blue Earth County, Minnesota =

Township in Minnesota, United States

Pleasant Mound Township
- Township
- Location within the state of Minnesota Pleasant Mound Township (the United States)
- Coordinates: 43°53′25″N 94°17′57″W
- Country: United States
- State: Minnesota
- County: Blue Earth

Area
  - Total: 36.0 sq mi (93.2 km^{2})
  - Land: 36.0 sq mi (93.2 km^{2})
  - Water: 0 sq mi (0.0 km^{2})
- Elevation: 1,040 ft (317 m)

Population (2000)
  - Total: 235
  - Density: 6.5/sq mi (2.5/km^{2})
- Time zone: UTC-6 (Central (CST))
  - Summer (DST): UTC-5 (CDT)
- FIPS code: 27-51604
- GNIS feature ID: 0665322

Pleasant Mound Township is a township in Blue Earth County, Minnesota, United States. The population was 235 as of the 2000 census.

== History ==
Pleasant Mound Township was organized in 1865.

== Geography ==
According to the United States Census Bureau, the township has a total area of 36.0 square miles (93.2 km^{2}), all land.

=== Unincorporated community ===
- Willow Creek at 43.894680°N 94.268573°W

=== Major highway ===
- Minnesota State Highway 30

=== Adjacent townships ===
- Ceresco Township (north)
- Vernon Center Township (northeast)
- Shelby Township (east)
- Nashville Township, Martin County (south)
- Westford Township, Martin County (southwest)
- Antrim Township, Watonwan County (west)
- Fieldon Township, Watonwan County (northwest)

=== Cemeteries ===
The township contains South Saint Johns Cemetery.

== Demographics ==
As of the census of 2000, there were 235 people, 96 households, and 74 families residing in the township. The population density was 6.5 people per square mile (2.5/km^{2}). There were 108 housing units at an average density of 3.0/sq mi (1.2/km^{2}). The racial makeup of the township was 100.00% White.

There were 96 households, out of which 31.3% had children under the age of 18 living with them, 69.8% were married couples living together, 2.1% had a female householder with no husband present, and 22.9% were non-families. 22.9% of all households were made up of individuals, and 9.4% had someone living alone who was 65 years of age or older. The average household size was 2.45 and the average family size was 2.84.

In the township the population was spread out, with 24.7% under the age of 18, 6.0% from 18 to 24, 26.4% from 25 to 44, 24.3% from 45 to 64, and 18.7% who were 65 years of age or older. The median age was 42 years. For every 100 females, there were 109.8 males. For every 100 females age 18 and over, there were 118.5 males.

The median income for a household in the township was $30,000, and the median income for a family was $36,250. Males had a median income of $26,111 versus $19,063 for females. The per capita income for the township was $13,614. About 11.3% of families and 17.9% of the population were below the poverty line, including 33.7% of those under the age of eighteen and none of those 65 or over.
