= Butterfield Township =

Butterfield Township may refer to the following places in the United States:

- Butterfield Township, Michigan
- Butterfield Township, Minnesota
