= Madelia =

Madelia may refer to:

- Madelia (horse), a French Thoroughbred racehorse
- Madelia, Minnesota, United States
- Madelia Township, Watonwan County, Minnesota, United States
