= Tenmile Corner, Minnesota =

Unincorporated community in Minnesota, United States

Tenmile Corner
- Unincorporated community
- Location within Minnesota Location within the United States
- Coordinates: 43°58′43″N 94°25′45″W
- Country: United States
- State: Minnesota
- County: Watonwan
- Elevation: 1,030 ft (310 m)
- Time zone: UTC-6 (Central (CST))
  - Summer (DST): UTC-5 (CDT)
- Area code: 507
- GNIS feature ID: 654974

Tenmile Corner is an unincorporated community in Fieldon Township, Watonwan County, Minnesota, United States, located between Madelia and St. James on the intersection of highway 60 and highway 15. Its elevation is 1,030 feet.
