= Sveadahl, Minnesota =

Unincorporated community in Minnesota, United States

Sveadahl
- Unincorporated community
- Location within Minnesota Location within the United States
- Coordinates: 44°04′27″N 94°44′22″W
- Country: United States
- State: Minnesota
- County: Watonwan
- Elevation: 1,073 ft (327 m)
- Time zone: UTC-6 (Central (CST))
  - Summer (DST): UTC-5 (CDT)
- Area code: 507
- GNIS feature ID: 652872

Sveadahl is an unincorporated community located in Adrian Township, Watonwan County, Minnesota, United States. The elevation is 1,073 feet.

== History ==
A post office called Sveadahl was established in 1892, and remained in operation until 1907. Sveadahl is a name derived from Swedish meaning "Swedish valley".
