= Odin Township =

Odin Township may refer to the following townships in the United States:

- Odin Township, Marion County, Illinois
- Odin Township, Watonwan County, Minnesota
