= Vernon Center =

Vernon Center is the name of some communities in the United States:

- Vernon Center, Minnesota, a small city
- Vernon Center Township, Blue Earth County, Minnesota
- Hamlet of Vernon Center in Oneida County, New York.
- Former name of Durand, Michigan
