= Fieldon =

Fieldon may refer to:

- Fieldon, Illinois
- Fieldon Township, Minnesota
