= Butternut Valley Township, Blue Earth County, Minnesota =

Township in Minnesota, United States

Butternut Valley Township
- Township
- Location within the state of Minnesota Butternut Valley Township (the United States)
- Coordinates: 44°9′34″N 94°19′10″W
- Country: United States
- State: Minnesota
- County: Blue Earth

Area
  - Total: 36.0 sq mi (93.3 km^{2})
  - Land: 35.4 sq mi (91.7 km^{2})
  - Water: 0.66 sq mi (1.7 km^{2})
- Elevation: 991 ft (302 m)

Population (2000)
  - Total: 382
  - Density: 11/sq mi (4.2/km^{2})
- Time zone: UTC-6 (Central (CST))
  - Summer (DST): UTC-5 (CDT)
- FIPS code: 27-09046
- GNIS feature ID: 0663717

Butternut Valley Township is a township in Blue Earth County, Minnesota, United States. The population was 382 as of the 2000 census.

== History ==
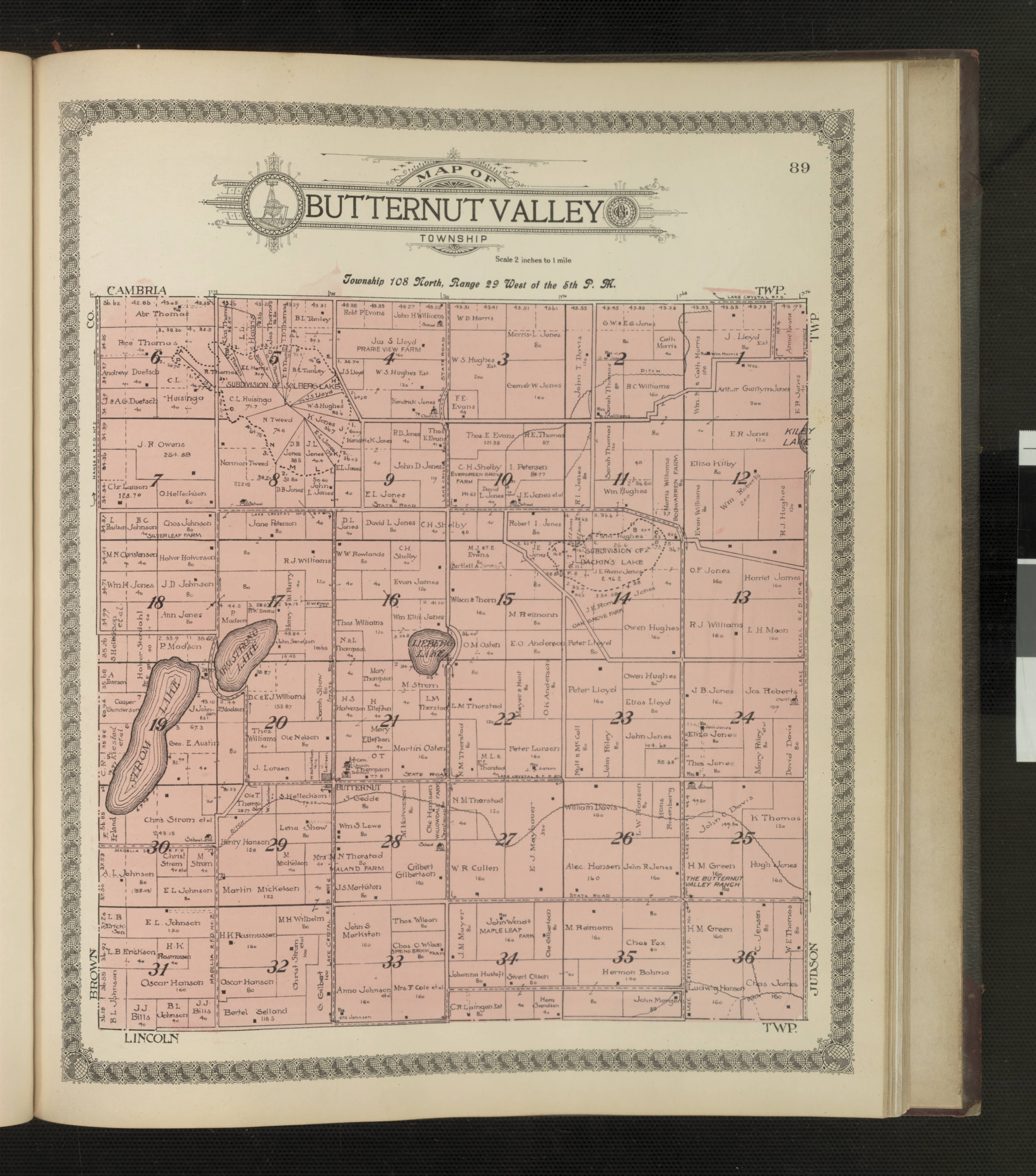
Butternut Valley Township Plat Map from the Standard Atlas, Blue Earth County, Minnesota

Butternut Valley Township was organized in 1858, and named after Butternuts, New York, the former home of an early settler.

== Geography ==
According to the United States Census Bureau, the township has a total area of 36.0 square miles (93 km^{2}), of which 35.4 square miles (92 km^{2}) is land and 0.6 square miles (1.6 km^{2}) (1.80%) is water.

=== Unincorporated community ===
- Butternut at 44.137740°N 94.329130°W

=== Major highway ===
- Minnesota State Highway 68

=== Lakes ===
- Armstrong Lake
- Lieberg Lake
- Strom Lake

=== Adjacent townships ===
- Cambria Township (north)
- Judson Township (east)
- Garden City Township (southeast)
- Lincoln Township (south)
- Madelia Township, Watonwan County (southwest)
- Linden Township, Brown County (west)

=== Cemetery ===
The township includes Our Saviors Cemetery.

== Demographics ==
As of the census of 2000, there were 382 people, 133 households, and 111 families residing in the township. The population density was 10.8 people per square mile (4.2/km^{2}). There were 135 housing units at an average density of 3.8/sq mi (1.5/km^{2}). The racial makeup of the township was 97.91% White, 1.83% African American and 0.26% Asian.

There were 133 households, out of which 41.4% had children under the age of 18 living with them, 75.2% were married couples living together, 1.5% had a female householder with no husband present, and 16.5% were non-families. 13.5% of all households were made up of individuals, and 6.8% had someone living alone who was 65 years of age or older. The average household size was 2.87 and the average family size was 3.13.

In the township the population was spread out, with 28.0% under the age of 18, 6.8% from 18 to 24, 28.8% from 25 to 44, 22.8% from 45 to 64, and 13.6% who were 65 years of age or older. The median age was 39 years. For every 100 females, there were 131.5 males. For every 100 females age 18 and over, there were 116.5 males.

The median income for a household in the township was $41,136, and the median income for a family was $42,045. Males had a median income of $29,615 versus $17,273 for females. The per capita income for the township was $16,797. About 4.4% of families and 8.6% of the population were below the poverty line, including 14.0% of those under age 18 and 7.5% of those age 65 or over.
