= Antrim Township =

Antrim Township may refer to:

- Antrim Township, Michigan
- Antrim Township, Watonwan County, Minnesota
- Antrim Township, Wyandot County, Ohio
- Antrim Township, Pennsylvania
