= Sigel Township, Brown County, Minnesota =

Township in Minnesota, United States

Sigel Township
- Township
- Location within the state of Minnesota Sigel Township (the United States)
- Coordinates: 44°14′4″N 94°33′47″W
- Country: United States
- State: Minnesota
- County: Brown

Area
  - Total: 39.6 sq mi (102.6 km^{2})
  - Land: 38.8 sq mi (100.4 km^{2})
  - Water: 0.85 sq mi (2.2 km^{2})
- Elevation: 981 ft (299 m)

Population (2000)
  - Total: 432
  - Density: 11/sq mi (4.3/km^{2})
- Time zone: UTC-6 (Central (CST))
  - Summer (DST): UTC-5 (CDT)
- FIPS code: 27-60160
- GNIS feature ID: 0665609

Sigel Township is a township in Brown County, Minnesota, United States. The population was 432 as of the 2000 census. The township was first settled in 1856 and organized during the American Civil War in 1862, and was named in honor of German immigrant and Union Army general Franz Sigel.

== Geography ==
According to the United States Census Bureau, the township has a total area of 39.6 square miles (102.6 km^{2}), of which 38.8 square miles (100.4 km^{2}) is land and 0.9 square miles (2.2 km^{2}) (2.15%) is water. The Cottonwood and Little Cottonwood Rivers flow through the township.

=== Lakes ===
- Clear Lake
- Juni Lake
- School Lake
- Zanders Lake (east quarter)

=== Adjacent townships ===
- Milford Township (north)
- Cottonwood Township (east)
- Lake Hanska Township (south)
- Albin Township (southwest)
- Stark Township (west)
- Home Township (northwest)

== Demographics ==
As of the census of 2000, there were 432 people, 151 households, and 122 families residing in the township. The population density was 11.1 people per square mile (4.3/km^{2}). There were 158 housing units at an average density of 4.1/sq mi (1.6/km^{2}). The racial makeup of the township was 98.84% White, 0.23% Asian, and 0.93% from two or more races. Hispanic or Latino of any race were 1.62% of the population.

There were 151 households, out of which 36.4% had children under the age of 18 living with them, 75.5% were married couples living together, 1.3% had a female householder with no husband present, and 19.2% were non-families. 14.6% of all households were made up of individuals, and 4.0% had someone living alone who was 65 years of age or older. The average household size was 2.86 and the average family size was 3.20.

In the township the population was spread out, with 28.5% under the age of 18, 7.4% from 18 to 24, 28.0% from 25 to 44, 22.7% from 45 to 64, and 13.4% who were 65 years of age or older. The median age was 38 years. For every 100 females, there were 117.1 males. For every 100 females age 18 and over, there were 123.9 males.

The median income for a household in the township was $43,472, and the median income for a family was $45,750. Males had a median income of $30,781 versus $26,136 for females. The per capita income for the township was $17,051. About 1.6% of families and 3.1% of the population were below the poverty line, including 1.7% of those under age 18 and 6.0% of those age 65 or over.
