= Stark Township, Brown County, Minnesota =

Township in Minnesota, United States

Stark Township
- Township
- Location within the state of Minnesota Stark Township (the United States)
- Coordinates: 44°14′52″N 94°41′18″W
- Country: United States
- State: Minnesota
- County: Brown

Area
  - Total: 36.1 sq mi (93.6 km^{2})
  - Land: 35.6 sq mi (92.2 km^{2})
  - Water: 0.54 sq mi (1.4 km^{2})
- Elevation: 1,007 ft (307 m)

Population (2000)
  - Total: 384
  - Density: 11/sq mi (4.2/km^{2})
- Time zone: UTC-6 (Central (CST))
  - Summer (DST): UTC-5 (CDT)
- FIPS code: 27-62518
- GNIS feature ID: 0665700

Stark Township is a township in Brown County, Minnesota, United States. The population was 384 as of the 2000 census.

== History ==
Stark Township was organized in 1868. It was named for August Starck, an early settler and native of Germany.

== Geography ==
According to the United States Census Bureau, the township has a total area of 36.1 square miles (93.6 km^{2}), of which 35.6 square miles (92.2 km^{2}) is land and 0.5 square miles (1.4 km^{2}) (1.50%) is water. The Cottonwood and Little Cottonwood Rivers flow through the township.

=== Unincorporated communities ===
- Iberia at 44.2391273°N 94.6952585°W
- Stark at 44.2394052°N 94.6497008°W

=== Major highway ===
- Minnesota State Highway 4

=== Lakes ===
- Bachelor Lake
- Gilman Lake
- Zanders Lake (west three-quarters)

=== Adjacent townships ===
- Home Township (north)
- Milford Township (northeast)
- Sigel Township (east)
- Albin Township (south)
- Mulligan Township (southwest)
- Leavenworth Township (west)
- Prairieville Township (northwest)

== Demographics ==
As of the census of 2000, there were 384 people, 137 households, and 102 families residing in the township. The population density was 10.8 people per square mile (4.2/km^{2}). There were 140 housing units at an average density of 3.9/sq mi (1.5/km^{2}). The racial makeup of the township was 98.44% White, 0.26% African American, 1.30% from other races. Hispanic or Latino of any race were 1.30% of the population.

There were 137 households, out of which 40.1% had children under the age of 18 living with them, 66.4% were married couples living together, 1.5% had a female householder with no husband present, and 25.5% were non-families. 24.1% of all households were made up of individuals, and 12.4% had someone living alone who was 65 years of age or older. The average household size was 2.80 and the average family size was 3.35.

In the township the population was spread out, with 32.0% under the age of 18, 5.2% from 18 to 24, 28.6% from 25 to 44, 21.4% from 45 to 64, and 12.8% who were 65 years of age or older. The median age was 36 years. For every 100 females, there were 108.7 males. For every 100 females age 18 and over, there were 119.3 males.

The median income for a household in the township was $36,705, and the median income for a family was $41,667. Males had a median income of $30,417 versus $26,375 for females. The per capita income for the township was $14,716. About 10.7% of families and 8.3% of the population were below the poverty line, including 9.6% of those under age 18 and none of those age 65 or over.
