= South Branch, Minnesota =

Unincorporated community in Minnesota, United States

South Branch
- Unincorporated community
- Location within Minnesota Location within the United States
- Coordinates: 43°53′02″N 94°32′58″W
- Country: United States
- State: Minnesota
- County: Watonwan
- Elevation: 1,112 ft (339 m)
- Time zone: UTC-6 (Central (CST))
  - Summer (DST): UTC-5 (CDT)
- Area code: 507
- GNIS feature ID: 652272

South Branch is an unincorporated community in South Branch Township, Watonwan County, Minnesota, United States.
