= Lake Hanska =

Lake Hanska may refer to:

- Lake Hanska Township, Brown County, Minnesota, U.S.
- Lake Hanska, a lake in Brown County, Minnesota, U.S.

== See also ==
- Hanska, Minnesota, U.S.
