= Garden City Township, Blue Earth County, Minnesota =

Township in Minnesota, United States

Garden City Township
- Township
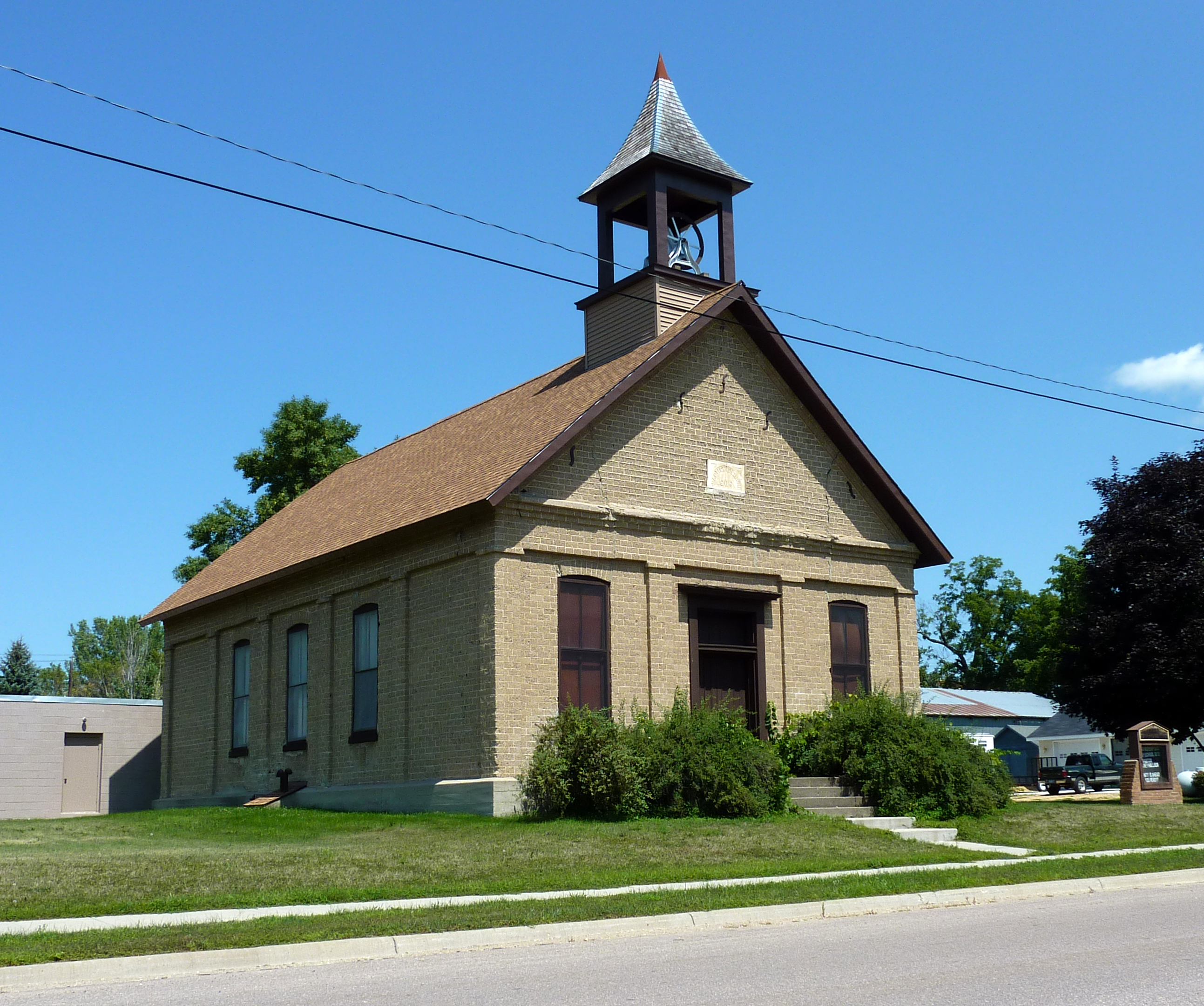
- The First Baptist Church is on the National Register of Historic Places.

- Location within the state of Minnesota Garden City Township (the United States)
- Coordinates: 44°3′36″N 94°11′54″W
- Country: United States
- State: Minnesota
- County: Blue Earth

Area
  - Total: 34.9 sq mi (90.4 km^{2})
  - Land: 33.1 sq mi (85.7 km^{2})
  - Water: 1.8 sq mi (4.7 km^{2})
- Elevation: 1,004 ft (306 m)

Population (2000)
  - Total: 700
  - Density: 21/sq mi (8.2/km^{2})
- Time zone: UTC-6 (Central (CST))
  - Summer (DST): UTC-5 (CDT)
- ZIP code: 56034
- Area code: 507
- FIPS code: 27-23102
- GNIS feature ID: 0664243

Garden City Township is a township in Blue Earth County, Minnesota, United States. The population was 700 as of the 2000 census.

The unincorporated community of Garden City is located within Garden City Township. The township is home to the Blue Earth County Fair.

== Geography ==
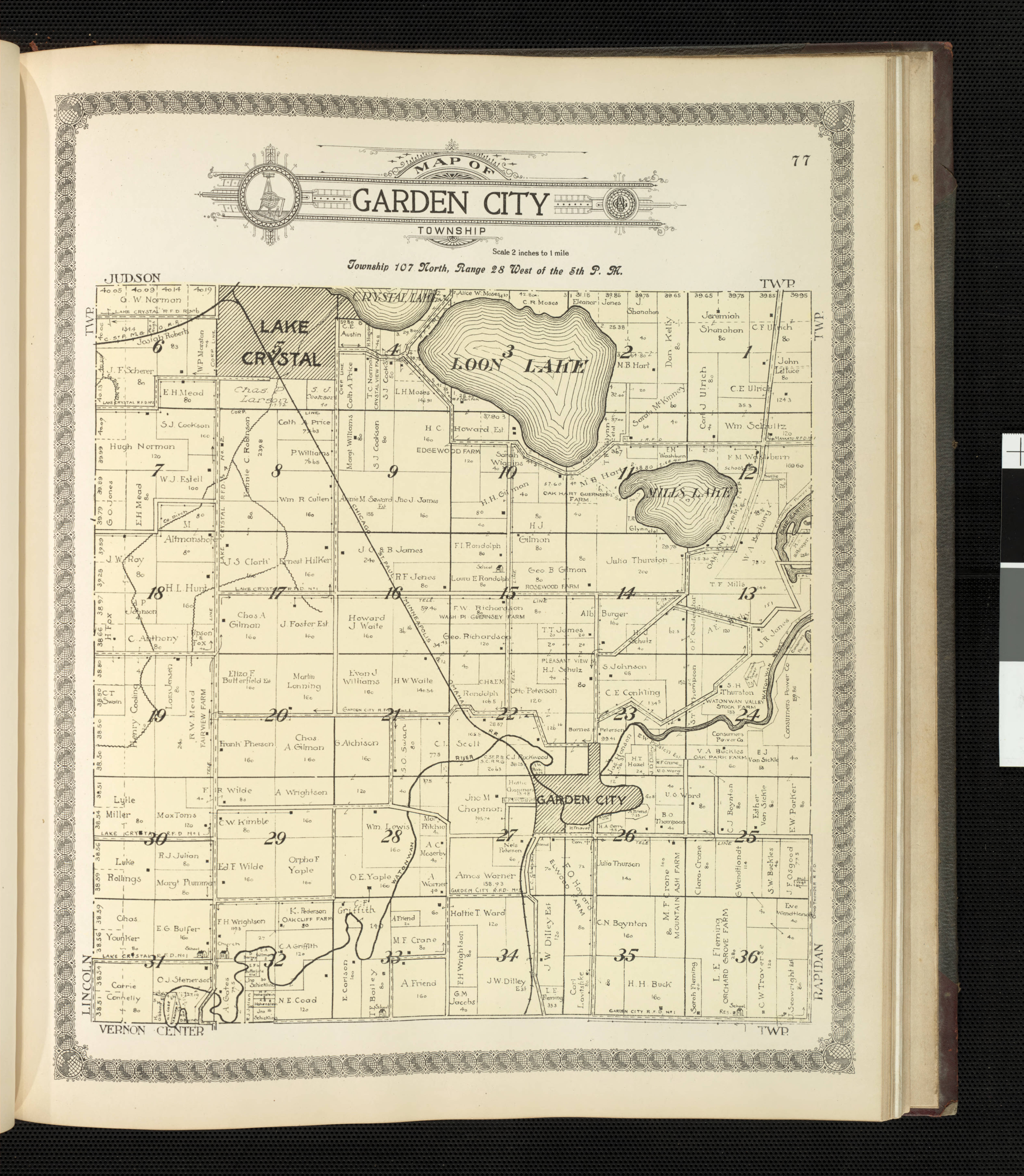
Garden City Township Plat Map from the Standard Atlas, Blue Earth County, Minnesota

According to the United States Census Bureau, the township has a total area of 34.9 square miles (90 km^{2}), of which 33.1 square miles (86 km^{2}) is land and 1.8 square miles (4.7 km^{2}) (5.21%) is water.

The southeast three-quarters of the city of Lake Crystal is within Garden City Township geographically but is a separate entity.

=== Unincorporated community ===
- Garden City

=== Major highways ===
- U.S. Highway 169
- Minnesota State Highway 60

=== Lakes ===
- Lake Crystal (south half)
- Loon Lake
- Mills Lake

=== Adjacent townships ===
- Judson Township (north)
- South Bend Township (northeast)
- Rapidan Township (east)
- Lyra Township (southeast)
- Vernon Center Township (south)
- Ceresco Township (southwest)
- Lincoln Township (west)
- Butternut Valley Township (northwest)

=== Cemeteries ===
The township includes Garden City Cemetery.

== Demographics ==
As of the census of 2000, there were 700 people, 268 households, and 209 families residing in the township. The population density was 21.2 people per square mile (8.2/km^{2}). There were 278 housing units at an average density of 8.4/sq mi (3.2/km^{2}). The racial makeup of the township was 98.14% White, 0.29% Asian, 1.29% from other races, and 0.29% from two or more races. Hispanic or Latino of any race were 1.71% of the population.

There were 268 households, out of which 33.2% had children under the age of 18 living with them, 69.4% were married couples living together, 3.4% had a female householder with no husband present, and 22.0% were non-families. 16.8% of all households were made up of individuals, and 9.3% had someone living alone who was 65 years of age or older. The average household size was 2.61 and the average family size was 2.92.

In the township the population was spread out, with 24.3% under the age of 18, 6.6% from 18 to 24, 28.3% from 25 to 44, 27.1% from 45 to 64, and 13.7% who were 65 years of age or older. The median age was 40 years. For every 100 females, there were 105.3 males. For every 100 females age 18 and over, there were 103.1 males.

The median income for a household in the township was $51,750, and the median income for a family was $54,896. Males had a median income of $36,250 versus $26,094 for females. The per capita income for the township was $20,191. About 0.9% of families and 2.2% of the population were below the poverty line, including 2.1% of those under the age of 18 and 2.2% of those 65 and older.
