= Home Township, Brown County, Minnesota =

Township in Minnesota, United States

Home Township
- Township
- Location within the state of Minnesota Home Township (the United States)
- Coordinates: 44°20′19″N 94°41′35″W
- Country: United States
- State: Minnesota
- County: Brown

Area
  - Total: 52.5 sq mi (136.0 km^{2})
  - Land: 52.4 sq mi (135.6 km^{2})
  - Water: 0.15 sq mi (0.4 km^{2})
- Elevation: 1,007 ft (307 m)

Population (2000)
  - Total: 800
  - Density: 15/sq mi (5.9/km^{2})
- Time zone: UTC-6 (Central (CST))
  - Summer (DST): UTC-5 (CDT)
- FIPS code: 27-29960
- GNIS feature ID: 0664511

Home Township is a township in Brown County, Minnesota, United States. The population was 800 as of the 2000 census. Home Township was organized in 1866.

== Geography ==
According to the United States Census Bureau, the township has a total area of 52.5 square miles (136 km^{2}), of which 52.3 square miles (135 km^{2}) is land and 0.2 square miles (0.52 km^{2}) (0.29%) is water.

The city of Sleepy Eye is entirely within the township geographically but is a separate entity.

=== Major highways ===
- U.S. Highway 14
- Minnesota State Highway 4
- Minnesota State Highway 68

=== Lake ===
- Sleepy Eye Lake (northeast quarter)

=== Adjacent townships ===
- Ridgely Township, Nicollet County (north)
- West Newton Township, Nicollet County (northeast)
- Milford Township (east)
- Sigel Township (southeast)
- Stark Township (south)
- Leavenworth Township (southwest)
- Prairieville Township (west)
- Eden Township (northwest)

=== Cemeteries ===
The township includes the following cemeteries: Current, Golden Gate and Home.

== Demographics ==
As of the census of 2000, there were 800 people, 227 households, and 182 families residing in the township. The population density was 15.3 people per square mile (5.9/km^{2}). There were 237 housing units at an average density of 4.5/sq mi (1.7/km^{2}). The racial makeup of the township was 99.62% White, 0.25% Asian, 0.12% from other races. Hispanic or Latino of any race were 0.12% of the population.

There were 227 households, out of which 39.6% had children under the age of 18 living with them, 74.9% were married couples living together, 0.4% had a female householder with no husband present, and 19.8% were non-families. 16.3% of all households were made up of individuals, and 6.2% had someone living alone who was 65 years of age or older. The average household size was 2.94 and the average family size was 3.35.

In the township the population was spread out, with 25.9% under the age of 18, 6.1% from 18 to 24, 21.8% from 25 to 44, 20.6% from 45 to 64, and 25.6% who were 65 years of age or older. The median age was 43 years. For every 100 females, there were 96.1 males. For every 100 females age 18 and over, there were 91.9 males.

The median income for a household in the township was $53,750, and the median income for a family was $56,389. Males had a median income of $32,841 versus $25,673 for females. The per capita income for the township was $19,139. None of the families and 4.8% of the population were living below the poverty line, including no under eighteens and 17.4% of those over 64.
