= Shelby Township, Blue Earth County, Minnesota =

Township in Minnesota, United States

Shelby Township
- Township
- Location within the state of Minnesota Shelby Township (the United States)
- Coordinates: 43°53′2″N 94°11′34″W
- Country: United States
- State: Minnesota
- County: Blue Earth

Area
  - Total: 35.8 sq mi (92.6 km^{2})
  - Land: 35.6 sq mi (92.1 km^{2})
  - Water: 0.19 sq mi (0.5 km^{2})
- Elevation: 980 ft (300 m)

Population (2000)
  - Total: 294
  - Density: 8.3/sq mi (3.2/km^{2})
- Time zone: UTC-6 (Central (CST))
  - Summer (DST): UTC-5 (CDT)
- FIPS code: 27-59458
- GNIS feature ID: 0665586

Shelby Township is a township in Blue Earth County, Minnesota, United States. The population was 294 as of the 2000 census.

== History ==
Shelby Township was established in 1858, and named after Shelbyville, Indiana, the former home of an early settler.

== Geography ==
According to the United States Census Bureau, the township has a total area of 35.8 square miles (92.6 km^{2}), of which 35.6 square miles (92.1 km^{2}) is land and 0.2 square miles (0.5 km^{2}) (0.53%) is water.

The city of Amboy is entirely within this township geographically but is a separate entity.

=== Major highways ===
- U.S. Highway 169
- Minnesota State Highway 30

=== Lake ===
- Ida Lake

=== Adjacent townships ===
- Vernon Center Township (north)
- Lyra Township (northeast)
- Sterling Township (east)
- Winnebago City Township, Faribault County (south)
- Nashville Township, Martin County (southwest)
- Pleasant Mound Township (west)
- Ceresco Township (northwest)

=== Cemeteries ===
Cemeteries in the township include the following: Old Willow Creek, Pioneer Shelbyville, Pleasant View and Saint Paul's Lutheran.

== Demographics ==
As of the census of 2000, there were 294 people, 114 households, and 90 families residing in the township. The population density was 8.3 people per square mile (3.2/km^{2}). There were 121 housing units at an average density of 3.4/sq mi (1.3/km^{2}). The racial makeup of the township was 99.66% White and 0.34% African American.

There were 114 households, out of which 35.1% had children under the age of 18 living with them, 71.1% were married couples living together, 2.6% had a female householder with no husband present, and 20.2% were non-families. 19.3% of all households were made up of individuals, and 9.6% had someone living alone who was 65 years of age or older. The average household size was 2.58 and the average family size was 2.92.

In the township the population was spread out, with 26.9% under the age of 18, 5.8% from 18 to 24, 23.8% from 25 to 44, 24.8% from 45 to 64, and 18.7% who were 65 years of age or older. The median age was 40 years. For every 100 females, there were 107.0 males. For every 100 females age 18 and over, there were 108.7 males.

The median income for a household in the township was $48,125, and the median income for a family was $53,000. Males had a median income of $33,750 versus $24,375 for females. The per capita income for the township was $21,355. None of the families and 2.4% of the population were living below the poverty line, including no under eighteens and 9.8% of those over 64.

== History ==
Shelby Township was organized in 1858, the year Minnesota achieved statehood. The township's main inducement to settlement was its rich prairie loam, rendered still more attractive by the availability of wood lots along the Blue Earth River. By 1860, Shelby Township was the most populous in Blue Earth County. In addition to its 315 residents, it also sustained a small but thriving village known as Shelbyville, located in Section 35, about two miles south of modern Amboy. In the early 1860s Shelbyville hosted the county fair. The town included a hotel, church, schoolhouse, mill, two stores, a blacksmith shop, a wagon shop, and a post office.

By 1875, Shelby Township was a relatively mature agricultural area, well known for grains and livestock. At that time, the township's population was 800, and it remained at approximately the same level for the next thirty years. Despite such overall stability, there were some significant population shifts within the township itself.

The main catalyst for change was the St. Paul and Sioux City Railway (later a part of the Omaha Road), which in 1879 built a north–south branch line through Blue Earth County. In several townships along the proposed route, residents offered the railroad financial incentives to locate a depot in their vicinity. For reasons that are not completely clear, the citizens of Shelbyville declined to do so. On September 2, 1879, they voted down a proposition to give the railroad a $10,000 grant. A week earlier, however, a group of farmers residing two miles north of Shelbyville had made the railroad an offer of their own.

The farmers' proposal, which was accepted, was to buy forty acres of land for the railroad, if the railroad would lay out town lots, build a depot, and build a grain elevator. The town, named Amboy, was laid out in October 1879. This triggered the death of Shelbyville, which was deserted within three years, the buildings having been moved to other locations. Incorporating as a city in 1887, Amboy had more than 400 inhabitants by the turn of the century.
