= Grogan, Minnesota =

Unincorporated community in Minnesota, United States

Grogan
- Unincorporated community
- Location within Minnesota Location within the United States
- Coordinates: 44°00′59″N 94°32′12″W
- Country: United States
- State: Minnesota
- County: Watonwan
- Elevation: 1,043 ft (318 m)
- Time zone: UTC-6 (Central (CST))
  - Summer (DST): UTC-5 (CDT)
- Area code: 507
- GNIS feature ID: 644488

Grogan is an unincorporated community in Watonwan County, in the U.S. state of Minnesota.

== History ==
Grogan was named in 1890 for Matthew J. Grogan, a pioneer settler. A post office was established at Grogan in 1891, and remained in operation until it was discontinued in 1932.
