= Ronald G. Evans =

American politician and businessman

Ronald Grant Evans (December 26, 1915 – February 12, 1992) was an American politician and businessman.

Evans was born in Judson Township, Blue Earth County, Minnesota and went to the local high school. He also went to business college and was involved with the real estate business. Evans served in the United States Army during World War II. He lived in Mankato, Minnesota with his wife and family. Evans served on the Blue Earth County Commission from 1965 to 1974 and was a Republican. He served in the Minnesota House of Representatives in 1975 and 1976. He died at the Immanuel-St. Joseph Hospital in Mankato, Minnesota.
