= Linden, Minnesota =

Unincorporated community in Minnesota, US

Linden
- Unincorporated community
- Location within Minnesota Location within the United States
- Coordinates: 44°10′53″N 94°24′34″W
- Country: United States
- State: Minnesota
- County: Brown
- Elevation: 994 ft (303 m)
- Time zone: UTC-6 (Central (CST))
  - Summer (DST): UTC-5 (CDT)
- Area code: 507
- GNIS feature ID: 654797

Linden is an unincorporated community in Linden Township, Brown County, Minnesota, United States.
