= Cambria, Minnesota =

Unincorporated community in Minnesota, US

Cambria
- Unincorporated community
- Location within Minnesota Location within the United States
- Coordinates: 44°14′19″N 94°18′52″W
- Country: United States
- State: Minnesota
- County: Blue Earth
- Elevation: 807 ft (246 m)
- Time zone: UTC-6 (Central (CST))
  - Summer (DST): UTC-5 (CDT)
- Area code: 507
- GNIS feature ID: 640787

Cambria is an unincorporated community in Blue Earth County, Minnesota, United States.

== History ==
Cambria was platted in 1900. The community took its name from Cambria Township.

A post office was established at Cambria in 1881, closed in 1882, reopened in 1901, and closed permanently in 1967.

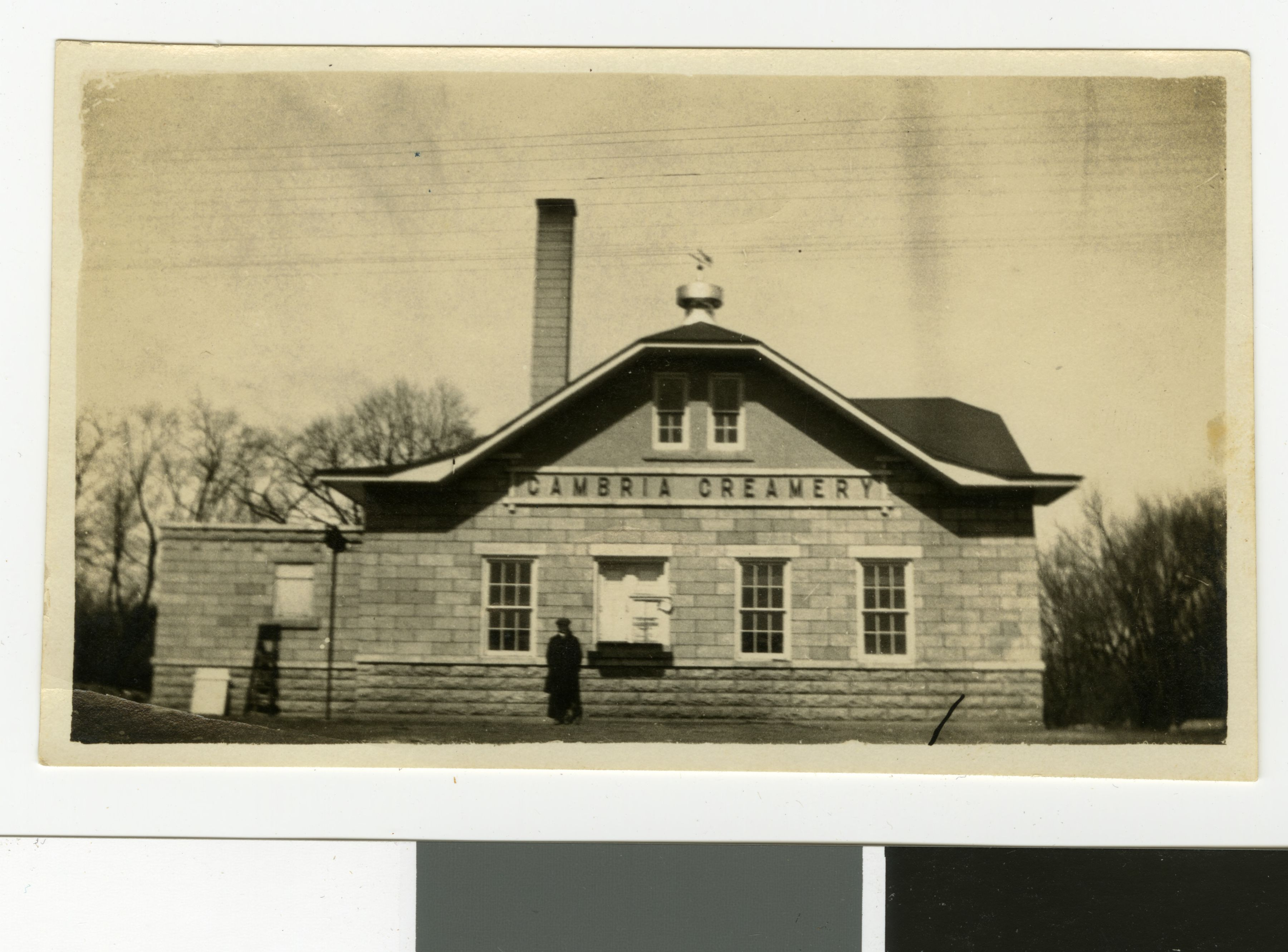
Cambria Creamery, Mankato, Minnesota
