= Lyra Township, Blue Earth County, Minnesota =

Township in Minnesota, United States

Lyra Township
- Township
- Location within the state of Minnesota Lyra Township (the United States)
- Coordinates: 43°59′51″N 94°5′0″W
- Country: United States
- State: Minnesota
- County: Blue Earth

Area
  - Total: 35.4 sq mi (91.7 km^{2})
  - Land: 35.4 sq mi (91.7 km^{2})
  - Water: 0.039 sq mi (0.1 km^{2})
- Elevation: 1,001 ft (305 m)

Population (2000)
  - Total: 378
  - Density: 11/sq mi (4.1/km^{2})
- Time zone: UTC-6 (Central (CST))
  - Summer (DST): UTC-5 (CDT)
- FIPS code: 27-38870
- GNIS feature ID: 0664851

Lyra Township is a township in Blue Earth County, Minnesota, United States. The population was 378 as of the 2000 census.

Lyra Township was organized in 1866.

== Geography ==
Public Land Survey System (PLSS) of the United States: Township 106 North, Range 27 West, Fifth Meridian, 22,998 Acres. According to the United States Census Bureau, the township has a total area of 35.4 square miles (91.7 km^{2}), of which 35.4 square miles (91.7 km^{2}) is land and 0.04 square miles (0.1 km^{2}) (0.06%) is water.

The city of Good Thunder is entirely within the township geographically but is a separate entity.

=== Adjacent townships ===
- Rapidan Township (north)
- Decoria Township (northeast)
- Beauford Township (east)
- Mapleton Township (southeast)
- Sterling Township (south)
- Shelby Township (southwest)
- Vernon Center Township (west)
- Garden City Township (northwest)

=== Cemeteries ===
The township includes the following cemeteries: Calvary and Saint Johns.

== Demographics ==
As of the census of 2000, there were 378 people, 138 households, and 104 families residing in the township. The population density was 10.7 people per square mile (4.1/km^{2}). There were 145 housing units at an average density of 4.1/sq mi (1.6/km^{2}). The racial makeup of the township was 98.94% White, 0.53% Asian, and 0.53% from two or more races. Hispanic or Latino of any race were 1.59% of the population.

There were 138 households, out of which 37.0% had children under the age of 18 living with them, 67.4% were married couples living together, 4.3% had a female householder with no husband present, and 24.6% were non-families. 21.0% of all households were made up of individuals, and 13.0% had someone living alone who was 65 years of age or older. The average household size was 2.74 and the average family size was 3.23.

In the township the population was spread out, with 31.2% under the age of 18, 5.6% from 18 to 24, 24.6% from 25 to 44, 21.4% from 45 to 64, and 17.2% who were 65 years of age or older. The median age was 39 years. For every 100 females, there were 97.9 males. For every 100 females age 18 and over, there were 97.0 males.

The median income for a household in the township was $34,219, and the median income for a family was $40,000. Males had a median income of $29,063 versus $16,563 for females. The per capita income for the township was $14,795. About 6.4% of families and 8.0% of the population were below the poverty line, including 13.6% of those under age 18 and 4.3% of those age 65 or over.
