= St. James Township, Watonwan County, Minnesota =

St. James Township, Minnesota
- Township
- Location within the state of Minnesota St. James Township, Minnesota (the United States)
- Coordinates: 43°58′40″N 94°40′12″W
- Country: United States
- State: Minnesota
- County: Watonwan

Area
  - Total: 34.0 sq mi (88.0 km^{2})
  - Land: 33.6 sq mi (87.0 km^{2})
  - Water: 0.39 sq mi (1.0 km^{2})
- Elevation: 1,093 ft (333 m)

Population (2000)
  - Total: 294
  - Density: 8.8/sq mi (3.4/km^{2})
- Time zone: UTC-6 (Central (CST))
  - Summer (DST): UTC-5 (CDT)
- FIPS code: 27-57058
- GNIS feature ID: 0665514

St. James Township is a township in Watonwan County, Minnesota, United States. The population was 294 as of the 2000 census.

St. James Township was organized in 1870, and named after its largest settlement, St. James.

== Geography ==
According to the United States Census Bureau, the township has a total area of 34.0 square miles (88.0 km^{2}); 33.6 square miles (87.0 km^{2}) is land and 0.4 square mile (1.0 km^{2}) (1.18%) is water.

== Demographics ==
As of the census of 2000, there were 294 people, 111 households, and 88 families residing in the township. The population density was 8.8 people per square mile (3.4/km^{2}). There were 123 housing units at an average density of 3.7/sq mi (1.4/km^{2}). The racial makeup of the township was 99.32% White, 0.34% from other races, and 0.34% from two or more races. Hispanic or Latino of any race were 1.36% of the population.

There were 111 households, out of which 34.2% had children under the age of 18 living with them, 73.9% were married couples living together, 2.7% had a female householder with no husband present, and 20.7% were non-families. 20.7% of all households were made up of individuals, and 12.6% had someone living alone who was 65 years of age or older. The average household size was 2.65 and the average family size was 3.02.

In the township the population was spread out, with 28.6% under the age of 18, 4.1% from 18 to 24, 24.5% from 25 to 44, 22.4% from 45 to 64, and 20.4% who were 65 years of age or older. The median age was 40 years. For every 100 females, there were 104.2 males. For every 100 females aged 18 and over, there were 105.9 males.

The median income for a household in the township was $36,806, and the median income for a family was $45,625. Males had a median income of $30,625 versus $20,625 for females. The per capita income for the township was $19,580. About 2.2% of families and 2.1% of the population were below the poverty line, including 4.6% of those under the age of eighteen and none of those aged sixty five or older.
