= Watonwan County, Minnesota =

County in Minnesota, United States

- County
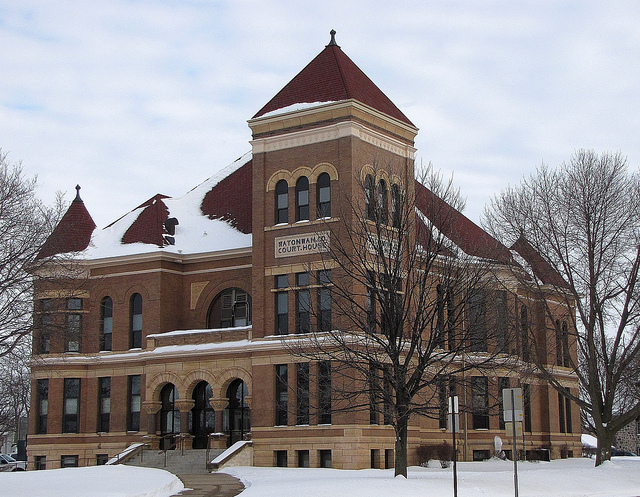
- Watonwan County Courthouse

- Location within the U.S. state of Minnesota
- Coordinates: 43°58′41.192″N 94°36′49.672″W
- Country: United States
- State: Minnesota
- Founded: February 25, 1860
- Named for: Watonwan River
- Seat: St. James
- Largest city: St. James

Area
  - Total: 439.730 sq mi (1,138.90 km^{2})
  - Land: 434.947 sq mi (1,126.51 km^{2})
  - Water: 4.783 sq mi (12.39 km^{2}) 1.1%

Population (2020)
  - Total: 11,253
  - Estimate (2025): 11,459 ▲
  - Density: 25.872/sq mi (9.9893/km^{2})
- Time zone: UTC−6 (Central)
  - Summer (DST): UTC−5 (CDT)
- Congressional district: 1st
- Website: www.watonwancountymn.gov

Watonwan County is a county in the U.S. state of Minnesota. As of the 2020 census, the population was 11,253. Its county seat is St. James.

== History ==
In 1849, the new territorial legislature of the recently organized Minnesota Territory authorized the creation of nine large counties across the Territory. Four years later, in 1853, one of those original counties of Dakota, had a large area separated and partitioned off to create Blue Earth County. Only two years later, by 1855, the western part of Blue Earth was then partitioned to create Brown County. Five years later, on February 25, 1860, the southern part of Brown was partitioned to create the county of Watanwan, with the town of Madelia as the original designated county seat. The county was named for its eponymous river (Watonwan River, which flows into the Blue Earth River, then the Minnesota River, then eventually into the "Father of Waters" - the Mississippi River, which drains the entire middle of the North American continent), whose name reflects the Dakota native word "watanwan," meaning "fish bait" or "plenty of fish." The word first appears in the modern written record on an 1843 map of the area so naming the river.

In 1869, the first European white settlers arrived in the area of the future town of Saint James, and the area began growing. In 1870, an extension of the St. Paul and Sioux City Railway was terminated at the village, and railway officials decided to name the terminus Saint James. By 1878, that town had grown to the extent that a vote was taken in the county to move the county seat and courthouse there from Madelia.

== Geography ==
Soils of Watonwan County

The terrain of Watonwan County consists of low, rolling hills carved by drainages and dotted with lakes and ponds. The area is completely devoted to agriculture where possible. The terrain slopes to the north and east, with its highest point near its southwest corner, at 1,293 ft (394 m) ASL. According to the United States Census Bureau, the county has a total area of 439.730 square miles (1,138.90 km^{2}), of which 434.947 square miles (1,126.51 km^{2}) is land and 4.783 square miles (12.39 km^{2}), or 1.1%, is water. The county is drained by the Watonwan River and its tributaries; the river flows eastward through the northern part of the county.

=== Major highways ===
- Minnesota State Highway 4
- Minnesota State Highway 15
- Minnesota State Highway 30
- Minnesota State Highway 60

=== Airports ===
- St. James Municipal Airport (JYG, LID) - 3 miles (4.8 km) east of St. James

=== Adjacent counties ===
- Brown County - north
- Blue Earth County - east
- Martin County - south
- Jackson County - southwest
- Cottonwood County - west

=== Protected areas ===
- Bergdahl State Wildlife Management Area
- Lewisville State Wildlife Management Area
- Turtle Marsh State Wildlife Management Area
- Wilson State Wildlife Management Area
- Woodlake State Wildlife Management Area

=== Lakes ===
- Bergdahl Lake
- Bullhead Lake
- Butterfield Lake
- Case Lake
- Cottonwood Lake
- Ewy Lake
- Fedji Lake
- Irish Lake
- Long Lake
- Mary Lake
- Mud Lake
- Kansas Lake
- Saint James Lake
- School Lake
- Sulem Lake
- Wilson Lake ("School Lake" in some records)
- Wood Lake (part)

== Demographics ==
Historical population
Census	Pop.	Note	%±
1870	2,426		—
1880	5,104		110.4%
1890	7,746		51.8%
1900	11,496		48.4%
1910	11,332		−1.4%
1920	12,457		9.9%
1930	12,802		2.8%
1940	13,902		8.6%
1950	13,881		−0.2%
1960	14,460		4.2%
1970	13,298		−8.0%
1980	12,361		−7.0%
1990	11,682		−5.5%
2000	11,876		1.7%
2010	11,211		−5.6%
2020	11,253		0.4%
2025 (est.)	11,459	▲	1.8%
U.S. Decennial Census; 1790–1960 1900–1990; 1990–2000 2010–2020

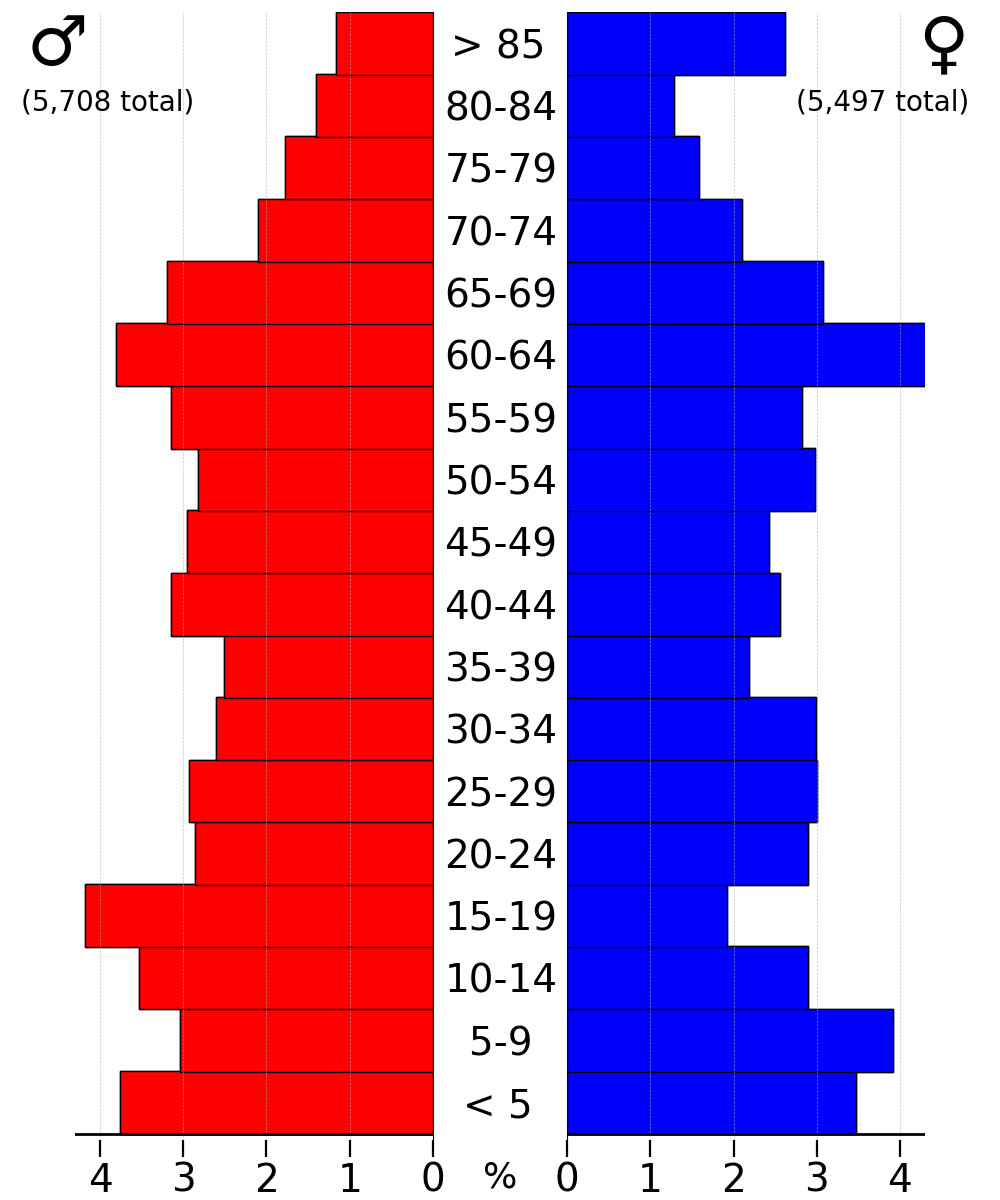
2022 US Census population pyramid for Watonwan County, from ACS 5-year estimates

As of the third quarter of 2024, the median home value in Watonwan County was $162,740.

As of the 2023 American Community Survey, there are 4,314 estimated households in Watonwan County with an average of 2.55 persons per household. The county has a median household income of $70,593. Approximately 10.0% of the county's population lives at or below the poverty line. Watonwan County has an estimated 65.4% employment rate, with 18.2% of the population holding a bachelor's degree or higher and 88.4% holding a high school diploma.

The top five reported ancestries (people were allowed to report up to two ancestries, thus the figures will generally add to more than 100%) were English (76.6%), Spanish (22.8%), Indo-European (0.3%), Asian and Pacific Islander (0.3%), and Other (0.0%).

The median age in the county was 40.6 years.

Watonwan County, Minnesota – racial and ethnic composition
Note: the US Census treats Hispanic/Latino as an ethnic category. This table excludes Latinos from the racial categories and assigns them to a separate category. Hispanics/Latinos may be of any race.

Race / ethnicity (NH = non-Hispanic)	Pop. 1980	Pop. 1990	Pop. 2000	Pop. 2010	Pop. 2020
White alone (NH)	12,074 (97.68%)	10,990 (94.08%)	9,848 (82.92%)	8,632 (77.00%)	7,689 (68.33%)
Black or African American alone (NH)	1 (0.01%)	8 (0.07%)	36 (0.30%)	74 (0.66%)	42 (0.37%)
Native American or Alaska Native alone (NH)	12 (0.10%)	20 (0.17%)	25 (0.21%)	22 (0.20%)	13 (0.12%)
Asian alone (NH)	33 (0.27%)	57 (0.49%)	100 (0.84%)	86 (0.77%)	86 (0.76%)
Pacific Islander alone (NH)	—	—	2 (0.02%)	2 (0.02%)	0 (0.00%)
Other race alone (NH)	2 (0.02%)	14 (0.12%)	1 (0.01%)	4 (0.04%)	15 (0.13%)
Mixed race or multiracial (NH)	—	—	60 (0.51%)	53 (0.47%)	176 (1.56%)
Hispanic or Latino (any race)	239 (1.93%)	593 (5.08%)	1,804 (15.19%)	2,338 (20.85%)	3,227 (28.67%)
Total	12,361 (100.00%)	11,682 (100.00%)	11,876 (100.00%)	11,211 (100.00%)	11,253 (100.00%)

=== 2020 census ===
As of the 2020 census, the county had a population of 11,253. The median age was 39.5 years. 25.2% of residents were under the age of 18 and 19.8% of residents were 65 years of age or older. For every 100 females there were 99.8 males, and for every 100 females age 18 and over there were 99.3 males age 18 and over.

The racial makeup of the county was 72.9% White, 0.4% Black or African American, 0.8% American Indian and Alaska Native, 0.9% Asian, <0.1% Native Hawaiian and Pacific Islander, 15.5% from some other race, and 9.4% from two or more races. Hispanic or Latino residents of any race comprised 28.7% of the population.

<0.1% of residents lived in urban areas, while 100.0% lived in rural areas.

There were 4,476 households in the county, of which 30.5% had children under the age of 18 living in them. Of all households, 49.1% were married-couple households, 20.3% were households with a male householder and no spouse or partner present, and 22.5% were households with a female householder and no spouse or partner present. About 29.6% of all households were made up of individuals and 14.9% had someone living alone who was 65 years of age or older.

There were 4,874 housing units, of which 8.2% were vacant. Among occupied housing units, 74.7% were owner-occupied and 25.3% were renter-occupied. The homeowner vacancy rate was 1.0% and the rental vacancy rate was 5.8%.

=== 2010 census ===
As of the 2010 census, there were 11,211 people, 4,520 households, and _ families residing in the county. The population density was 25.8 inhabitants per square mile (10.0/km^{2}). There were 5,047 housing units at an average density of 11.6 inhabitants per square mile (4.5/km^{2}). The racial makeup of the county was 86.88% White, 0.73% African American, 0.43% Native American, 0.79% Asian, 0.02% Pacific Islander, 9.97% from some other races and 1.18% from two or more races. Hispanic or Latino people of any race were 20.85% of the population.

=== 2000 census ===
As of the 2000 census, there were 11,876 people, 4,627 households, and 3,141 families in the county. The population density was 27.3 per square mile (10.5/km^{2}). There were 5,036 housing units at an average density of 11.6 per square mile (4.5/km^{2}). The racial makeup of the county was 88.54% White, 0.37% African American, 0.21% Native American, 0.87% Asian, 0.02% Pacific Islander, 8.78% from some other races and 1.21% from two or more races. Hispanic or Latino people of any race were 15.19% of the population. 40.9% were of German, 17.3% Norwegian and 5.8% Swedish ancestry.

There were 4,627 households, out of which 32.50% had children under the age of 18 living with them, 56.60% were married couples living together, 7.30% had a female householder with no husband present, and 32.10% were non-families. 28.70% of all households were made up of individuals, and 15.40% had someone living alone who was 65 years of age or older. The average household size was 2.53 and the average family size was 3.10.

The county population contained 27.60% under the age of 18, 7.80% from 18 to 24, 24.30% from 25 to 44, 21.70% from 45 to 64, and 18.60% who were 65 years of age or older. The median age was 39 years. For every 100 females there were 95.40 males. For every 100 females age 18 and over, there were 94.50 males age 18 and over.

The median income for a household in the county was $35,441, and the median income for a family was $42,321. Males had a median income of $29,242 versus $19,788 for females. The per capita income for the county was $16,413. About 7.80% of families and 9.80% of the population were below the poverty line, including 13.50% of those under age 18 and 8.80% of those age 65 or over.

== Communities ==
=== Cities ===
- Butterfield
- Darfur
- La Salle
- Lewisville
- Madelia
- Odin
- Ormsby (partly in Martin County)
- St. James (county seat)

=== Unincorporated communities ===
- Echols
- Godahl (partial)
- Grogan
- South Branch
- Sveadahl
- Tenmile Corner

=== Townships ===
- Adrian Township
- Antrim Township
- Butterfield Township
- Fieldon Township
- Long Lake Township
- Madelia Township
- Nelson Township
- Odin Township
- Riverdale Township
- Rosendale Township
- St. James Township
- South Branch Township

== Government and politics ==
Watonwan County has had its county seat and site of the Watonwan County Courthouse in the town of St. James since 1878, when it was moved from nearby Madelia where it had been located since the partition of the county from Brown County. Watowan's public citizenry of voters have tended to vote for the Republican Party; in two-thirds of the past 11 presidential elections years since 1980, the majority of county voters had selected the Republican Party's presidential and vice presidential nominees (as of 2020). But there are active party organizations and groups for both Republican, Democratic-Farmer-Labor and independent unaffiliated voting citizens of both conservative and liberal / progressive views.

United States presidential election results for Watonwan County, Minnesota
Year	Republican		Democratic		Third party(ies)	
Year	No.	%	No.	%	No.	%
1892	934	62.68%	388	26.04%	168	11.28%
1896	1,622	71.99%	586	26.01%	45	2.00%
1900	1,509	71.93%	509	24.26%	80	3.81%
1904	1,455	79.95%	307	16.87%	58	3.19%
1908	1,411	70.44%	537	26.81%	55	2.75%
1912	254	12.22%	618	29.74%	1,206	58.04%
1916	1,300	59.94%	801	36.93%	68	3.14%
1920	3,510	81.40%	647	15.00%	155	3.59%
1924	2,297	53.57%	279	6.51%	1,712	39.93%
1928	3,306	69.69%	1,412	29.76%	26	0.55%
1932	1,919	39.62%	2,795	57.71%	129	2.66%
1936	1,930	33.44%	3,668	63.55%	174	3.01%
1940	3,478	55.30%	2,783	44.25%	28	0.45%
1944	3,146	57.27%	2,324	42.31%	23	0.42%
1948	2,581	45.30%	3,039	53.33%	78	1.37%
1952	4,549	72.02%	1,752	27.74%	15	0.24%
1956	3,963	67.62%	1,886	32.18%	12	0.20%
1960	4,173	63.28%	2,412	36.57%	10	0.15%
1964	2,823	43.80%	3,615	56.09%	7	0.11%
1968	3,446	53.57%	2,701	41.99%	286	4.45%
1972	3,960	63.35%	2,229	35.66%	62	0.99%
1976	3,351	50.30%	3,177	47.69%	134	2.01%
1980	3,629	55.09%	2,442	37.07%	516	7.83%
1984	3,526	58.98%	2,425	40.57%	27	0.45%
1988	2,821	52.10%	2,544	46.98%	50	0.92%
1992	1,871	33.54%	2,100	37.65%	1,607	28.81%
1996	1,997	37.74%	2,534	47.89%	760	14.36%
2000	2,562	49.90%	2,258	43.98%	314	6.12%
2004	2,970	53.20%	2,514	45.03%	99	1.77%
2008	2,526	48.04%	2,562	48.73%	170	3.23%
2012	2,517	48.93%	2,494	48.48%	133	2.59%
2016	2,768	55.38%	1,814	36.29%	416	8.32%
2020	3,103	59.66%	1,987	38.20%	111	2.13%
2024	3,087	62.58%	1,723	34.93%	123	2.49%

County Board of Commissioners
Position	Name	District	Next election
Commissioner	Jim Pettersen	District 1	2028
Commissioner	Bill Miller	District 2	2026
Commissioner	Jim Branstad	District 3	2028
Commissioner	Scott Westerman	District 4	2026
Commissioner	Dillon Melheim	District 5	2028

State Legislature (2021-2023)
Position	Name	Affiliation	District
Senate	Julie Rosen	Republican	District 23
House of Representatives	Bjorn Olson	Republican	District 23A
House of Representatives	Jeremy Munson	Republican	District 23B

U.S Congress (2021-2023)
Position	Name	Affiliation	District
House of Representatives	Brad Finstad	Republican	1st
Senate	Amy Klobuchar	Democrat	N/A
Senate	Tina Smith	Democrat	N/A

== See also ==
- National Register of Historic Places listings in Watonwan County, Minnesota
