= Judson Township, Blue Earth County, Minnesota =

Township in Minnesota, United States

Judson Township
- Township
- Location within the state of Minnesota Judson Township (the United States)
- Coordinates: 44°9′7″N 94°11′28″W
- Country: United States
- State: Minnesota
- County: Blue Earth

Area
  - Total: 37.2 sq mi (96.4 km^{2})
  - Land: 36.6 sq mi (94.9 km^{2})
  - Water: 0.58 sq mi (1.5 km^{2})
- Elevation: 991 ft (302 m)

Population (2000)
  - Total: 591
  - Density: 16/sq mi (6.2/km^{2})
- Time zone: UTC-6 (Central (CST))
  - Summer (DST): UTC-5 (CDT)
- FIPS code: 27-32210
- GNIS feature ID: 0664590

Judson Township is a township in Blue Earth County, Minnesota, United States. The population was 591 as of the 2000 census.

== History ==
Judson Township was organized in 1858, and named for Adoniram Judson, an American missionary.

== Notable people ==
- Ronald G. Evans (1915–1992), businessman and Minnesota state legislator, was born in Judson Township
- Richard E. Wigley (1918–1998), farmer and Minnesota state legislator, was born in Judson Township.

== Geography ==
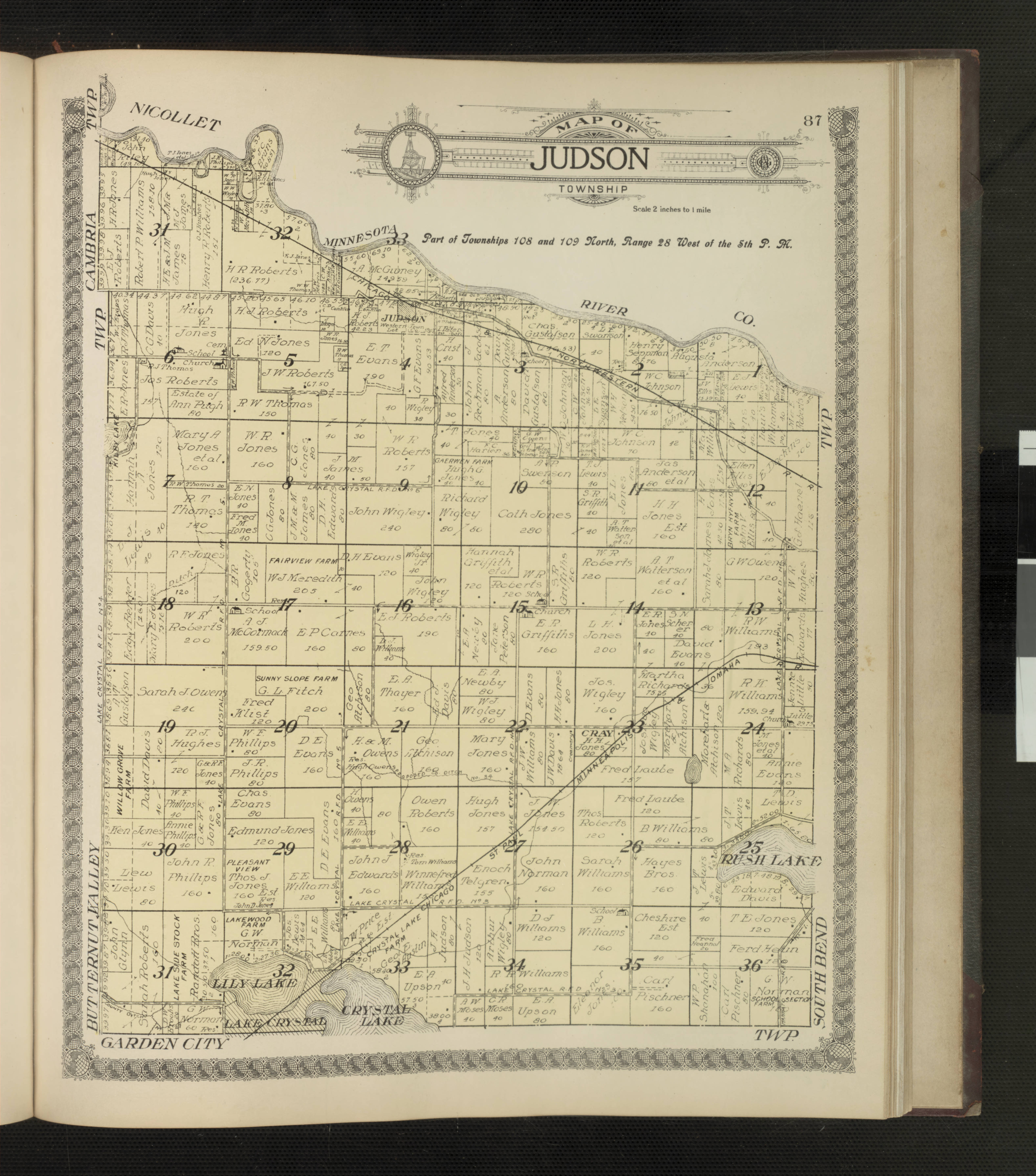
Judson Township Plat Map from the Standard Atlas, Blue Earth County, Minnesota

Public Land Survey System (PLSS) of the United States: Township 108 North, Range 28 West, Fifth Meridian, 23,193 Acres. According to the United States Census Bureau, the township has a total area of 37.2 square miles (96 km^{2}), of which 36.6 square miles (95 km^{2}) is land and 0.6 square miles (1.6 km^{2}) (1.61%) is water.

The north quarter of the city of Lake Crystal is within this township geographically but is a separate entity.

=== Unincorporated community ===
- Judson at 44.196354°N 94.195239°W

=== Major highways ===
- U.S. Highway 169
- Minnesota State Highway 60
- Minnesota State Highway 68

=== Lakes ===
- Horseshoe Lake
- Lily Lake
- Lake Crystal (north half)
- Mcgibneys Lake
- Mennenga Lake
- Rush Lake (west half)

=== Adjacent townships ===
- Nicollet Township, Nicollet County (north)
- Belgrade Township, Nicollet County (northeast)
- South Bend Township (east)
- Rapidan Township (southeast)
- Garden City Township (south)
- Lincoln Township (southwest)
- Butternut Valley Township (west)
- Cambria Township (northwest)
- Courtland Township, Nicollet County (northwest)

=== Cemeteries ===
The township includes the following cemeteries: Holy Family and Jerusalem.

== Demographics ==
The 2000 census enumerated 591 people, 232 households, and 168 families residing in the township. The population density was 16.1 people per square mile (6.2/km^{2}). There were 238 housing units at an average density of 6.5/sq mi (2.5/km^{2}). The racial makeup of the township was 99.66% White and 0.34% Asian. Hispanic or Latino of any race were 0.17% of the population.

There were 232 households, out of which 32.8% had children under the age of 18 living with them, 66.4% were married couples living together, 3.4% had a female householder with no husband present, and 27.2% were non-families. 21.1% of all households were made up of individuals, and 10.8% had someone living alone who was 65 years of age or older. The average household size was 2.53 and the average family size was 2.96.

In the township the population was spread out, with 23.2% under the age of 18, 7.3% from 18 to 24, 23.7% from 25 to 44, 30.3% from 45 to 64, and 15.6% who were 65 years of age or older. The median age was 43 years. For every 100 females, there were 98.3 males. For every 100 females age 18 and over, there were 105.4 males.

The median income for a household in the township was $46,071, and the median income for a family was $53,958. Males had a median income of $35,197 versus $21,176 for females. The per capita income for the township was $19,917. About 2.4% of families and 3.8% of the population were below the poverty line, including 1.4% of those under age 18 and 8.2% of those age 65 or over.
