= Cambria Township, Minnesota =

Township in Minnesota, United States

Cambria Township
- Township
- Location within the state of Minnesota Cambria Township (the United States)
- Coordinates: 44°13′38″N 94°19′26″W
- Country: United States
- State: Minnesota
- County: Blue Earth

Area
  - Total: 19.7 sq mi (51.0 km^{2})
  - Land: 19.7 sq mi (50.9 km^{2})
  - Water: 0.039 sq mi (0.1 km^{2})
- Elevation: 950 ft (290 m)

Population (2000)
  - Total: 271
  - Density: 14/sq mi (5.3/km^{2})
- Time zone: UTC-6 (Central (CST))
  - Summer (DST): UTC-5 (CDT)
- FIPS code: 27-09352
- GNIS feature ID: 0663728

Cambria Township is a township in Blue Earth County, Minnesota, United States. The population was 271 as of the 2000 census.

== History ==
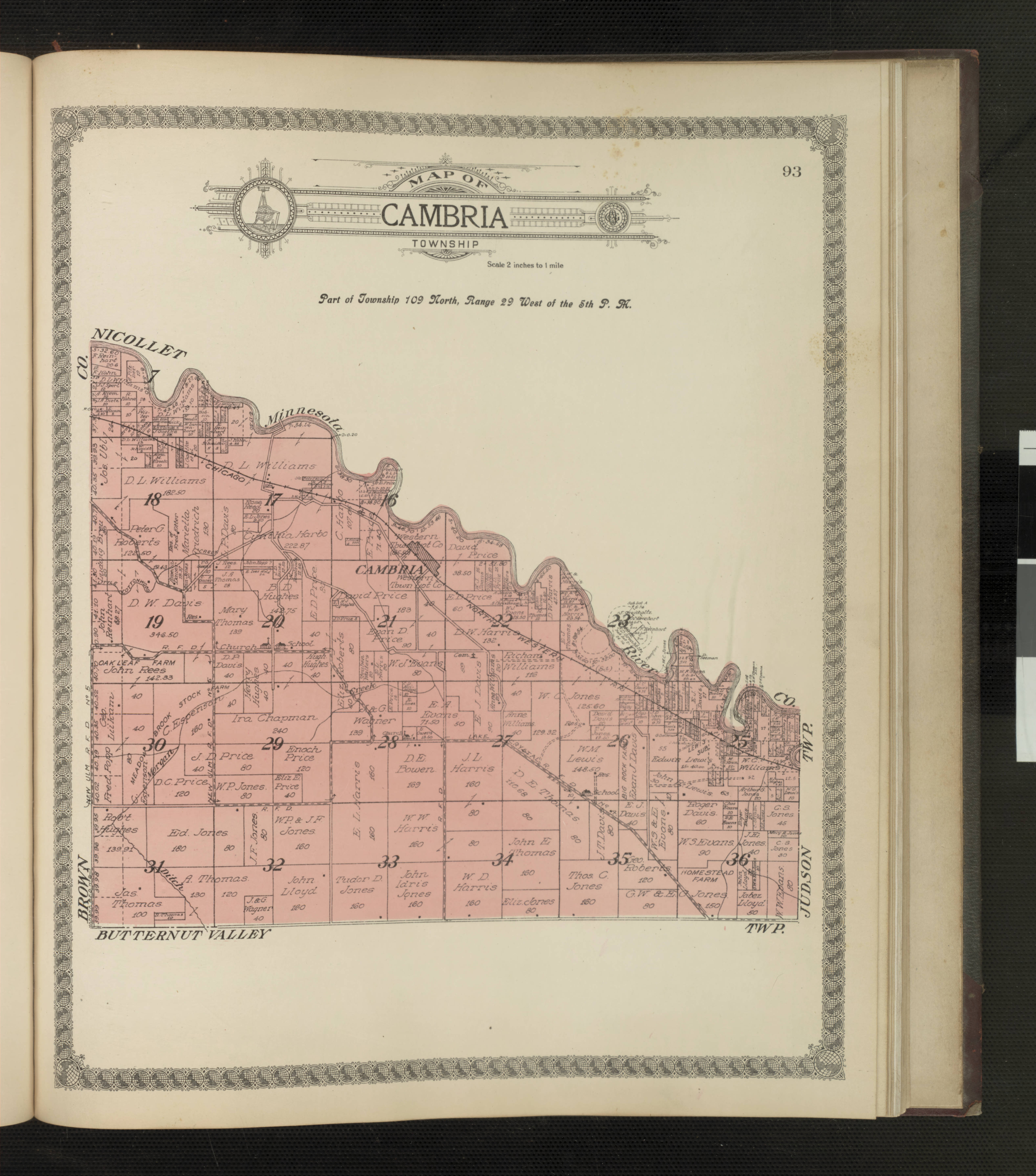
Cambria Township Plat Map from the Standard Atlas, Blue Earth County, Minnesota

Cambria Township was organized in 1867. This township was named from Cambria, the Latin name of Wales.

== Geography ==
According to the United States Census Bureau, the township has a total area of 19.7 square miles (51 km^{2}), of which 19.7 square miles (51 km^{2}) is land and 0.04 square miles (0.10 km^{2}) (0.20%) is water. The Minnesota River flows along the township's northern boundary; its tributary the Little Cottonwood River flows through the northwestern part of the township to its confluence with the Minnesota.

=== Unincorporated community ===
- Cambria at 44.238576°N 94.314410°W

=== Major highway ===
- Minnesota State Highway 68

=== Adjacent townships ===
- Courtland Township, Nicollet County (north)
- Nicollet Township, Nicollet County (east)
- Judson Township (southeast)
- Butternut Valley Township (south)
- Linden Township, Brown County (southwest)
- Cottonwood Township, Brown County (west)

=== Cemetery ===
The township includes Cambria Cemetery.

== Demographics ==
As of the census of 2000, there were 271 people, 107 households, and 80 families residing in the township. The population density was 13.8 people per square mile (5.3/km^{2}). There were 115 housing units at an average density of 5.8/sq mi (2.3/km^{2}). The racial makeup of the township was 98.15% White, 0.74% Asian, 0.37% from other races, and 0.74% from two or more races. Hispanic or Latino of any race were 0.37% of the population.

There were 107 households, out of which 32.7% had children under the age of 18 living with them, 64.5% were married couples living together, 9.3% had a female householder with no husband present, and 25.2% were non-families. 21.5% of all households were made up of individuals, and 7.5% had someone living alone who was 65 years of age or older. The average household size was 2.53 and the average family size was 2.94.

In the township the population was spread out, with 27.3% under the age of 18, 6.6% from 18 to 24, 26.9% from 25 to 44, 28.8% from 45 to 64, and 10.3% who were 65 years of age or older. The median age was 40 years. For every 100 females, there were 99.3 males. For every 100 females age 18 and over, there were 99.0 males.

The median income for a household in the township was $40,625, and the median income for a family was $50,469. Males had a median income of $35,104 versus $23,750 for females. The per capita income for the township was $21,900. None of the families and 1.3% of the population were living below the poverty line, including no under eighteens and 11.1% of those over 64.
