= South Branch Township, Watonwan County, Minnesota =

South Branch Township, Minnesota
- Township
- Location within the state of Minnesota South Branch Township, Minnesota (the United States)
- Coordinates: 43°53′42″N 94°33′33″W
- Country: United States
- State: Minnesota
- County: Watonwan

Area
  - Total: 39.1 sq mi (101.2 km^{2})
  - Land: 39.1 sq mi (101.2 km^{2})
  - Water: 0 sq mi (0.0 km^{2})
- Elevation: 1,109 ft (338 m)

Population (2000)
  - Total: 303
  - Density: 7.8/sq mi (3/km^{2})
- Time zone: UTC-6 (Central (CST))
  - Summer (DST): UTC-5 (CDT)
- FIPS code: 27-61276
- GNIS feature ID: 0665645

South Branch Township is a township in Watonwan County, Minnesota, United States. The population was 303 at the 2000 census.

== History ==
South Branch Township was organized in 1869, and named after the South Fork Watonwan River.

== Geography ==
According to the United States Census Bureau, the township has a total area of 39.1 square miles (101.2 km^{2}), all land.

== Demographics ==
As of the census of 2000, there were 303 people, 112 households, and 86 families residing in the township. The population density was 7.8 people per square mile (3.0/km^{2}). There were 117 housing units at an average density of 3.0/sq mi (1.2/km^{2}). The racial makeup of the township was 96.04% White, 0.99% Black or African American, none Native American, none Asian, none Pacific Islander, 2.97% from other races. Hispanic or Latino of any race were 3.30% of the population.

There were 112 households, out of which 33.0% had children under the age of 18 living with them, 75.0% were married couples living together, 0.9% had a female householder with no husband present, and 23.2% were non-families. 18.8% of all households were made up of individuals, and 9.8% had someone living alone who was 65 years of age or older. The average household size was 2.71 and the average family size was 3.13.

In the township the population was spread out, with 30.0% under the age of 18, 3.6% from 18 to 24, 25.7% from 25 to 44, 22.4% from 45 to 64, and 18.2% who were 65 years of age or older. The median age was 39 years. For every 100 females, there were 103.4 males. For every 100 females age 18 and over, there were 107.8 males.

The median income for a household in the township was $35,625, and the median income for a family was $39,205. Males had a median income of $25,357 versus $18,438 for females. The per capita income for the township was $13,449. About 13.9% of families and 10.7% of the population were below the poverty line, including 4.1% of those under the age of eighteen and 8.9% of those 65 or over.
