= Vernon Center Township, Blue Earth County, Minnesota =

Township in Minnesota, United States

Vernon Center Township
- Township
- Location within the state of Minnesota Vernon Center Township (the United States)
- Coordinates: 43°58′16″N 94°11′57″W
- Country: United States
- State: Minnesota
- County: Blue Earth

Area
  - Total: 35.5 sq mi (92.0 km^{2})
  - Land: 35.5 sq mi (92.0 km^{2})
  - Water: 0 sq mi (0.0 km^{2})
- Elevation: 1,020 ft (311 m)

Population (2000)
  - Total: 301
  - Density: 8.5/sq mi (3.3/km^{2})
- Time zone: UTC-6 (Central (CST))
  - Summer (DST): UTC-5 (CDT)
- ZIP code: 56090
- Area code: 507
- FIPS code: 27-66928
- GNIS feature ID: 0665864

Vernon Center Township is a township in Blue Earth County, Minnesota, United States. The population was 301 as of the 2000 census.

Vernon Center Township was established in 1858.

== Geography ==
According to the United States Census Bureau, the township has a total area of 35.5 square miles (92.0 km^{2}), all land.

The city of Vernon Center is entirely within this township geographically but is a separate entity.

=== Major highway ===
- U.S. Highway 169

=== Adjacent townships ===
- Garden City Township (north)
- Rapidan Township (northeast)
- Lyra Township (east)
- Sterling Township (southeast)
- Shelby Township (south)
- Pleasant Mound Township (southwest)
- Ceresco Township (west)
- Lincoln Township (northwest)

=== Cemeteries ===
The township contains these two cemeteries: Saint Matthews and Vernon Center.

== Demographics ==
As of the census of 2000, there were 301 people, 113 households, and 90 families residing in the township. The population density was 8.5 people per square mile (3.3/km^{2}). There were 119 housing units at an average density of 3.3/sq mi (1.3/km^{2}). The racial makeup of the township was 99.34% White, 0.33% Native American, and 0.33% from two or more races. Hispanic or Latino of any race were 1.00% of the population.

There were 113 households, out of which 29.2% had children under the age of 18 living with them, 73.5% were married couples living together, 1.8% had a female householder with no husband present, and 19.5% were non-families. 12.4% of all households were made up of individuals, and 4.4% had someone living alone who was 65 years of age or older. The average household size was 2.66 and the average family size was 2.90.

In the township the population was spread out, with 25.2% under the age of 18, 9.3% from 18 to 24, 25.9% from 25 to 44, 24.3% from 45 to 64, and 15.3% who were 65 years of age or older. The median age was 39 years. For every 100 females, there were 123.0 males. For every 100 females age 18 and over, there were 122.8 males.

The median income for a household in the township was $44,375, and the median income for a family was $49,583. Males had a median income of $28,542 versus $17,188 for females. The per capita income for the township was $20,729. About 6.0% of families and 10.1% of the population were below the poverty line, including 17.6% of those under the age of eighteen and none of those 65 or over.
