= Odin Township, Watonwan County, Minnesota =

Odin Township, Minnesota
- Township
- Location within the state of Minnesota Odin Township, Minnesota (the United States)
- Coordinates: 43°52′46″N 94°48′2″W
- Country: United States
- State: Minnesota
- County: Watonwan

Area
  - Total: 35.5 sq mi (92.0 km^{2})
  - Land: 34.6 sq mi (89.6 km^{2})
  - Water: 0.89 sq mi (2.3 km^{2})
- Elevation: 1,230 ft (375 m)

Population (2000)
  - Total: 206
  - Density: 6.0/sq mi (2.3/km^{2})
- Time zone: UTC-6 (Central (CST))
  - Summer (DST): UTC-5 (CDT)
- ZIP code: 56160
- Area code: 507
- FIPS code: 27-48112
- GNIS feature ID: 0665200

Odin Township is a township in Watonwan County, Minnesota, United States. The population was 206 at the 2000 census.

== History ==
Odin Township was organized in 1872, and named after Odin, the chief god of the Norse pantheon.

== Geography ==
According to the United States Census Bureau, the township has a total area of 35.5 square miles (92.0 km^{2}); 34.6 square miles (89.6 km^{2}) is land and 0.9 square mile (2.3 km^{2}) (2.53%) is water.

== Demographics ==
As of the census of 2000, there were 206 people, 86 households, and 60 families residing in the township. The population density was 6.0 people per square mile (2.3/km^{2}). There were 93 housing units at an average density of 2.7/sq mi (1.0/km^{2}). The racial makeup of the township was 96.60% White, 0.49% African American, 0.49% Asian, and 2.43% from two or more races.

There were 86 households, out of which 29.1% had children under the age of 18 living with them, 60.5% were married couples living together, 7.0% had a female householder with no husband present, and 29.1% were non-families. 27.9% of all households were made up of individuals, and 10.5% had someone living alone who was 65 years of age or older. The average household size was 2.40 and the average family size was 2.90.

In the township the population was spread out, with 23.8% under the age of 18, 7.3% from 18 to 24, 24.8% from 25 to 44, 28.2% from 45 to 64, and 16.0% who were 65 years of age or older. The median age was 42 years. For every 100 females, there were 108.1 males. For every 100 females age 18 and over, there were 112.2 males.

The median income for a household in the township was $38,625, and the median income for a family was $39,625. Males had a median income of $22,917 versus $17,500 for females. The per capita income for the township was $15,830. About 14.3% of families and 13.3% of the population were below the poverty line, including 8.2% of those under the age of eighteen and 14.7% of those 65 or over.
