= Long Lake Township, Watonwan County, Minnesota =

Long Lake Township, Minnesota
- Township
- Location within the state of Minnesota Long Lake Township, Minnesota (the United States)
- Coordinates: 43°53′20″N 94°41′13″W
- Country: United States
- State: Minnesota
- County: Watonwan

Area
  - Total: 35.6 sq mi (92.3 km^{2})
  - Land: 34.4 sq mi (89.0 km^{2})
  - Water: 1.3 sq mi (3.3 km^{2})
- Elevation: 1,161 ft (354 m)

Population (2000)
  - Total: 346
  - Density: 10/sq mi (3.9/km^{2})
- Time zone: UTC-6 (Central (CST))
  - Summer (DST): UTC-5 (CDT)
- FIPS code: 27-38024
- GNIS feature ID: 0664819

Long Lake Township is a township in Watonwan County, Minnesota, United States. The population was 346 at the 2000 census.

== History ==
Long Lake Township was organized in 1868.

== Geography ==
According to the United States Census Bureau, the township has a total area of 35.6 square miles (92.3 km^{2}), of which 34.4 square miles (89.0 km^{2}) are land and 1.3 square miles (3.3 km^{2}) (3.56%) are water.

== Demographics ==
As of the census of 2000, there were 346 people, 141 households, and 108 families residing in the township. The population density was 10.1 inhabitants per square mile (3.9/km^{2}). There were 181 housing units at an average density of 5.3 per square mile (2.0/km^{2}). The racial makeup of the township was 96.82% White, 0.58% Native American, 2.31% Asian, and 0.29% from two or more races. Hispanic or Latino of any race were 0.29% of the population.

27.0% of all households had children under the age of 18 living with them, 70.9% were married couples living together, 3.5% had a female householder with no husband present, and 22.7% were non-families. 20.6% of all households were made up of individuals, and 8.5% had someone living alone who was 65 years of age or older. The average household size was 2.45 and the average family size was 2.85.

In the township the population was spread out, with 22.8% under the age of 18, 4.3% from 18 to 24, 17.1% from 25 to 44, 34.1% from 45 to 64, and 21.7% who were 65 years of age or older. The median age was 48 years. For every 100 females, there were 113.6 males. For every 100 females age 18 and over, there were 103.8 males.

The median income for a household in the township was $47,500, and the median income for a family was $56,250. Males had a median income of $37,969 versus $21,250 for females. The per capita income for the township was $20,009. About 7.4% of families and 8.6% of the population were below the poverty line, including 8.0% of those under age 18 and 20.3% of those age 65 or over.
