= Butterfield Township, Watonwan County, Minnesota =

Butterfield Township, Minnesota
- Township
- Location within the state of Minnesota Butterfield Township, Minnesota (the United States)
- Coordinates: 43°57′47″N 94°48′15″W
- Country: United States
- State: Minnesota
- County: Watonwan

Area
  - Total: 35.6 sq mi (92.2 km^{2})
  - Land: 35.4 sq mi (91.6 km^{2})
  - Water: 0.23 sq mi (0.6 km^{2})
- Elevation: 1,171 ft (357 m)

Population (2000)
  - Total: 297
  - Density: 8.3/sq mi (3.2/km^{2})
- Time zone: UTC-6 (Central (CST))
  - Summer (DST): UTC-5 (CDT)
- ZIP code: 56120
- Area code: 507
- FIPS code: 27-09010
- GNIS feature ID: 0663716

Butterfield Township is a township in Watonwan County, Minnesota, United States. The population was 297 at the 2000 census.

== History ==
Butterfield Township was organized in 1872, and named for William Butterfield, a pioneer settler.

== Geography ==
According to the United States Census Bureau, the township has a total area of 35.6 square miles (92 km^{2}), of which 35.4 square miles (92 km^{2}) is land and 0.2 square miles (0.52 km^{2}) (0.62%) is water.

== Demographics ==
As of the census of 2000, there were 297 people, 99 households, and 79 families residing in the township. The population density was 8.4 inhabitants per square mile (3.2/km^{2}). There were 110 housing units at an average density of 3.1 per square mile (1.2/km^{2}). The racial makeup of the township was 92.26% White, 2.02% Native American, 3.03% Asian, 2.69% from other races. Hispanic or Latino of any race were 6.40% of the population.

There were 99 households, out of which 40.4% had children under the age of 18 living with them, 70.7% were married couples living together, 4.0% had a female householder with no husband present, and 20.2% were non-families. 17.2% of all households were made up of individuals, and 6.1% had someone living alone who was 65 years of age or older. The average household size was 3.00 and the average family size was 3.38.

In the township the population was spread out, with 34.7% under the age of 18, 5.7% from 18 to 24, 26.3% from 25 to 44, 24.6% from 45 to 64, and 8.8% who were 65 years of age or older. The median age was 34 years. For every 100 females, there were 106.3 males. For every 100 females age 18 and over, there were 115.6 males.

The median income for a household in the township was $36,528, and the median income for a family was $39,250. Males had a median income of $24,688 versus $20,000 for females. The per capita income for the township was $13,524. About 7.6% of families and 14.8% of the population were below the poverty line, including 24.0% of those under the age of eighteen and 8.3% of those 65 or over.
