= Clear Lake (Brown County, Minnesota) =

Lake in Brown County, Minnesota

- Location within Minnesota
- Location: Brown County, Minnesota, United States
- Coordinates: 44°15′34″N 094°31′14″W
- Type: Natural
- Basin countries: United States
- Surface area: 335 acres (1,360,000 m^{2})
- Max. depth: 7 feet (2.1 m)
- Settlements: North Cottonwood, Township

Clear Lake is a lake in North Cottonwood, Township, Brown County, Minnesota, in the United States. It is a protected public lake.

== History ==
The lake is a sport fishing lake which has been stocked with Fingerlings from a fishery.

In 2019 Clear lake was filmed for a television show called "Fishing the Midwest".

== See also ==
- List of lakes of Minnesota
- List of fishes of Minnesota
