= Nelson Township, Watonwan County, Minnesota =

Nelson Township, Minnesota
- Township
- Location within the state of Minnesota Nelson Township, Minnesota (the United States)
- Coordinates: 44°3′36″N 94°40′21″W
- Country: United States
- State: Minnesota
- County: Watonwan

Area
  - Total: 35.7 sq mi (92.4 km^{2})
  - Land: 35.6 sq mi (92.3 km^{2})
  - Water: 0 sq mi (0.0 km^{2})
- Elevation: 1,050 ft (320 m)

Population (2000)
  - Total: 309
  - Density: 8.5/sq mi (3.3/km^{2})
- Time zone: UTC-6 (Central (CST))
  - Summer (DST): UTC-5 (CDT)
- FIPS code: 27-45124
- GNIS feature ID: 0665075

Nelson Township is a township in Watonwan County, Minnesota, United States. The population was 309 at the 2000 census.

Nelson Township was organized in 1870.

== Geography ==
According to the United States Census Bureau, the township has a total area of 35.7 square miles (92.4 km^{2}), of which 35.7 square miles (92.3 km^{2}) is land and 0.03% is water.

== Demographics ==
As of the census of 2000, there were 309 people, 112 households, and 90 families residing in the township. The population density was 8.7 people per square mile (3.3/km^{2}). There were 123 housing units at an average density of 3.4/sq mi (1.3/km^{2}). The racial makeup of the township was 95.15% White, 1.62% Native American, 0.65% from other races, and 2.59% from two or more races. Hispanic or Latino of any race were 3.24% of the population.

There were 112 households, out of which 36.6% had children under the age of 18 living with them, 69.6% were married couples living together, 6.3% had a female householder with no husband present, and 19.6% were non-families. 17.0% of all households were made up of individuals, and 8.0% had someone living alone who was 65 years of age or older. The average household size was 2.76 and the average family size was 3.04.

In the township the population was spread out, with 31.1% under the age of 18, 5.5% from 18 to 24, 27.5% from 25 to 44, 21.7% from 45 to 64, and 14.2% who were 65 years of age or older. The median age was 38 years. For every 100 females, there were 116.1 males. For every 100 females age 18 and over, there were 113.0 males.

The median income for a household in the township was $47,000, and the median income for a family was $50,750. Males had a median income of $37,917 versus $22,143 for females. The per capita income for the township was $19,699. About 2.4% of families and 2.5% of the population were below the poverty line, including none of those under the age of eighteen and 3.8% of those 65 or over.
