= Riverdale Township, Watonwan County, Minnesota =

Riverdale Township, Minnesota
- Township
- Location within the state of Minnesota Riverdale Township, Minnesota (the United States)
- Coordinates: 44°3′49″N 94°33′25″W
- Country: United States
- State: Minnesota
- County: Watonwan

Area
  - Total: 38.9 sq mi (100.7 km^{2})
  - Land: 38.9 sq mi (100.7 km^{2})
  - Water: 0.039 sq mi (0.1 km^{2})
- Elevation: 1,010 ft (308 m)

Population (2000)
  - Total: 338
  - Density: 8.8/sq mi (3.4/km^{2})
- Time zone: UTC-6 (Central (CST))
  - Summer (DST): UTC-5 (CDT)
- FIPS code: 27-54556
- GNIS feature ID: 0665424

Riverdale Township is a township in Watonwan County, Minnesota, United States. The population was 338 at the 2000 census.

Riverdale Township was organized in 1869, and named after the Watonwan River.

== Geography ==
According to the United States Census Bureau, the township has a total area of 38.9 square miles (100.7 km^{2}); 38.9 square miles (100.6 km^{2}) is land and 0.04 square mile (0.1 km^{2}) (0.08%) is water.

== Demographics ==
As of the census of 2020, there were 248 people, 108 households, and 96 families residing in the township (2000 census). The population density was 8.7 people per square mile (3.4/km^{2}). There were 130 housing units at an average density of 3.3/sq mi (1.3/km^{2}). The racial makeup of the township was 96.45% White, 0.59% Asian, 2.96% from other races. Hispanic or Latino of any race were 3.85% of the population.

There were 126 households, out of which 33.3% had children under the age of 18 living with them, 63.5% were married couples living together, 4.8% had a female householder with no husband present, and 23.8% were non-families. 16.7% of all households were made up of individuals, and 9.5% had someone living alone who was 65 years of age or older. The average household size was 2.68 and the average family size was 3.09.

In the township the population was spread out, with 26.9% under the age of 18, 4.7% from 18 to 24, 25.1% from 25 to 44, 26.6% from 45 to 64, and 16.6% who were 65 years of age or older. The median age was 42 years. For every 100 females, there were 109.9 males. For every 100 females age 18 and over, there were 120.5 males.

The median income for a household in the township was $44,423, and the median income for a family was $50,000. Males had a median income of $32,500 versus $18,750 for females. The per capita income for the township was $20,099. About 4.2% of families and 6.8% of the population were below the poverty line, including 9.3% of those under age 18 and 9.3% of those age 65 or over.
