= Antrim Township, Watonwan County, Minnesota =

Antrim Township, Minnesota
- Township
- Location within the state of Minnesota Antrim Township, Minnesota (the United States)
- Coordinates: 43°53′3″N 94°25′9″W
- Country: United States
- State: Minnesota
- County: Watonwan

Area
  - Total: 35.8 sq mi (92.7 km^{2})
  - Land: 35.7 sq mi (92.4 km^{2})
  - Water: 0.12 sq mi (0.3 km^{2})
- Elevation: 1,070 ft (326 m)

Population (2000)
  - Total: 291
  - Density: 8.0/sq mi (3.1/km^{2})
- Time zone: UTC-6 (Central (CST))
  - Summer (DST): UTC-5 (CDT)
- FIPS code: 27-01810
- GNIS feature ID: 0663443

Antrim Township is a township in Watonwan County, Minnesota, United States. The population was 291 at the 2000 census.

Antrim Township was organized in 1867.

== Geography ==
According to the United States Census Bureau, the township has a total area of 35.8 square miles (93 km^{2}), of which 35.7 square miles (92 km^{2}) is land and 0.1 square miles (0.26 km^{2}) (0.34%) is water.

== Demographics ==
As of the census of 2000, there were 291 people, 115 households, and 81 families residing in the township. The population density was 8.2 inhabitants per square mile (3.2/km^{2}). There were 124 housing units at an average density of 3.5 per square mile (1.4/km^{2}). The racial makeup of the township was 94.50% White, 1.72% African American, 3.09% from other races, and 0.69% from two or more races. Hispanic or Latino of any race were 3.78% of the population.

There were 115 households, out of which 27.0% had children under the age of 18 living with them, 70.4% were married couples living together, and 28.7% were non-families. 25.2% of all households were made up of individuals, and 13.9% had someone living alone who was 65 years of age or older. The average household size was 2.53 and the average family size was 3.04.

In the township the population was spread out, with 27.8% under the age of 18, 3.8% from 18 to 24, 21.3% from 25 to 44, 27.8% from 45 to 64, and 19.2% who were 65 years of age or older. The median age was 44 years. For every 100 females, there were 117.2 males. For every 100 females age 18 and over, there were 101.9 males.

The median income for a household in the township was $35,625, and the median income for a family was $41,250. Males had a median income of $23,750 versus $18,333 for females. The per capita income for the township was $21,739. About 6.6% of families and 12.2% of the population were below the poverty line, including 25.6% of those under the age of eighteen and none of those 65 or over.
