= Adrian Township, Watonwan County, Minnesota =

Adrian Township, Minnesota
- Township
- Location within the state of Minnesota Adrian Township, Minnesota (the United States)
- Coordinates: 44°3′42″N 94°47′21″W
- Country: United States
- State: Minnesota
- County: Watonwan

Area
  - Total: 35.6 sq mi (92.2 km^{2})
  - Land: 34.7 sq mi (89.9 km^{2})
  - Water: 0.89 sq mi (2.3 km^{2})
- Elevation: 1,102 ft (336 m)

Population (2000)
  - Total: 173
  - Density: 4.9/sq mi (1.9/km^{2})
- Time zone: UTC-6 (Central (CST))
  - Summer (DST): UTC-5 (CDT)
- FIPS code: 27-00280
- GNIS feature ID: 0663382

Adrian Township is a township in Watonwan County, Minnesota. The population was 173 at the time of the year 2000 census.

== History ==
Adrian Township was organized in 1871.

== Geography ==
According to the United States Census Bureau, the township has a total area of 35.6 square miles (92 km^{2}), of which 34.7 square miles (90 km^{2}) is land and 0.9 square miles (2.3 km^{2}) (2.45%) is water.

== Demographics ==
As of the census of year 2000, there were 173 people, 80 households, and 56 families residing in the township. The population density was 5.0 people per square mile (1.9/km^{2}). There were 92 housing units at an average density of 2.7/sq mi (1.0/km^{2}). The racial makeup of the township was 95.38% White, 0.58% African American, 3.47% from other races, and 0.58% from two or more races. Hispanic or Latino of any race were 5.20% of the population.

Out of 80 households, 20% included children under 18. Married couples made up 66.3% of the households, while 2.5% had a female with no husband present. Non-family households accounted for 30%. Additionally, 27.5% of all households consisted of individuals, and 12.5% had someone living alone who was 65 years or older. The average household size was 2.16 and the average family size was 2.59.

In the township the population was spread out, with 16.2% under the age of 18, 4.6% from 18 to 24, 13.3% from 25 to 44, 41.6% from 45 to 64, and 24.3% who were 65 years of age or older. The median age was 50 years. For every 100 females, there were 108.4 males. For every 100 females age 18 and over, there were 110.1 males.

The median income for a household in the township was $41,875, and the median income for a family was $45,750. Males had a median income of $29,688 versus $17,292 for females. The per capita income for the township was $22,279. About 3.1% of families and 5.2% of the population were below the poverty line, including none of those under the age of eighteen and 7.7% of those sixty five or over.
