= Little Cottonwood River =

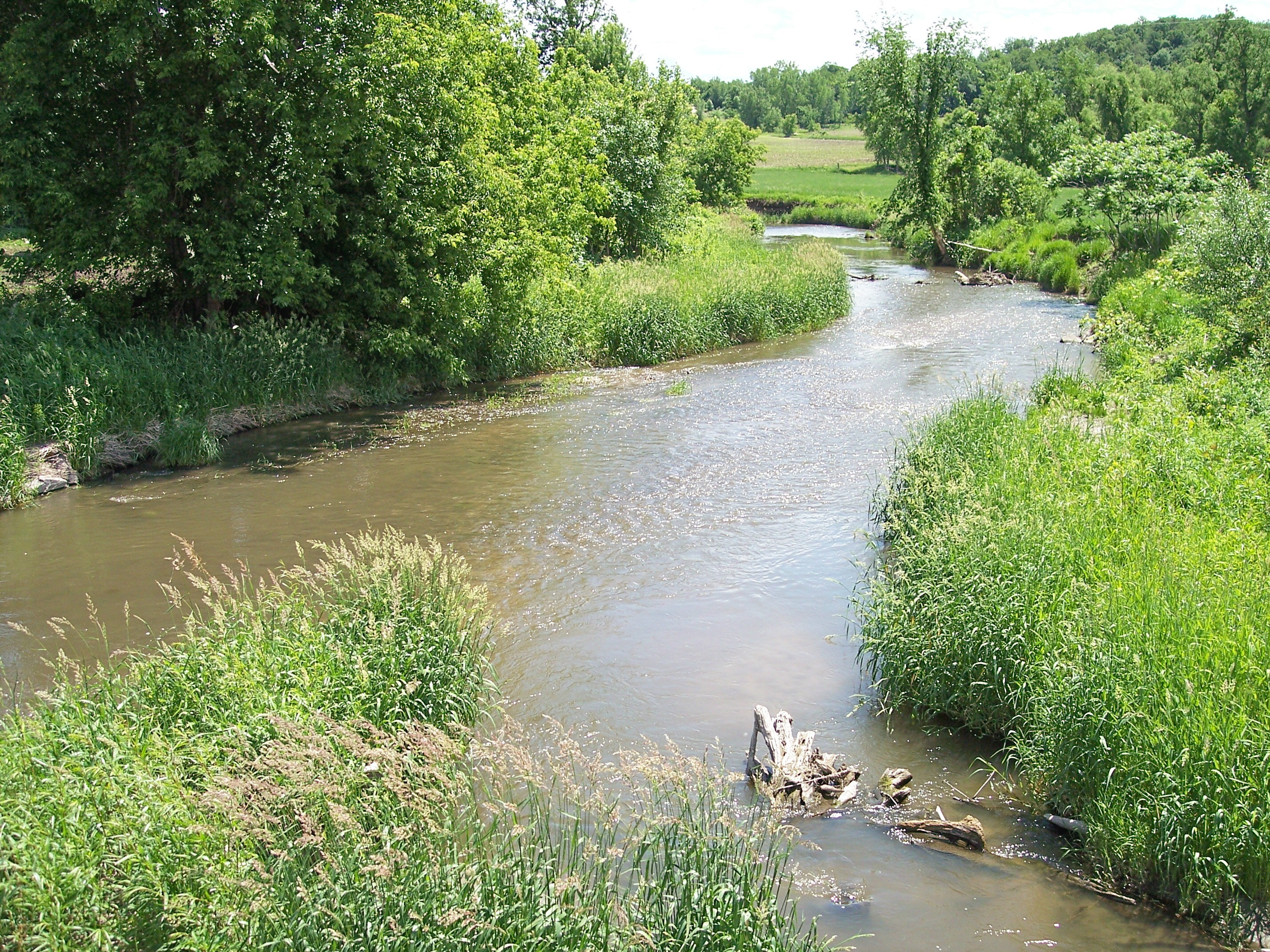
- The Little Cottonwood River near its mouth in Cambria Township in 2007

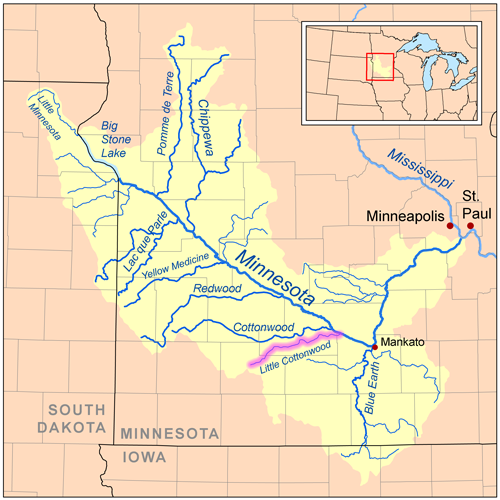

Location
- Country: United States
- State: Minnesota

Physical characteristics
- Source
  - location: Amboy Township, Cottonwood County
  - coordinates: 44°02′28″N 95°11′35″W
  - elevation: 1,467 ft (447 m)
- Mouth: Minnesota River
  - location: Cambria Township, Blue Earth County
  - coordinates: 44°15′05″N 94°19′47″W
  - elevation: 787 ft (240 m)
- Length: 82.9 mi (133.4 km)
- Basin size: 230 mi^{2} (600 km^{2})
- Discharge
  - location: Cambria Township
  - average: 72.5 cu ft/s (2.05 m^{3}/s)
  - minimum: 0.1 cu ft/s (0.0028 m^{3}/s)
  - maximum: 3,520 cu ft/s (100 m^{3}/s)

The Little Cottonwood River is a tributary of the Minnesota River, 83 miles (134 km) long, in southwestern Minnesota in the United States. Via the Minnesota River, it is part of the watershed of the Mississippi River, draining an area of 230 square miles (600 km^{2}) in an agricultural region.

The Little Cottonwood River rises south of Jeffers in Amboy Township in Cottonwood County, beginning as a drainage ditch constructed in 1997. In its upper course the stream flows swiftly in a northeastward course and passes rock outcrops, including the Jeffers Petroglyphs. It flows generally east-northeastwardly through Brown County into northwestern Blue Earth County, where it joins the Minnesota River in Cambria Township, approximately seven miles (11 km) southeast of New Ulm. For much of its lower course, it roughly parallels the Cottonwood River to the north at a distance of three to ten miles (5–15 km). The stream's watershed is narrow, with no major tributaries. Land within the watershed consists primarily of till plains; in 1990, 90% of the land was cultivated for agriculture.

Common fish in the river include black and yellow bullhead, rock bass, golden redhorse, and various species of darters and shiners.

== Flow rate ==
At the United States Geological Survey's stream gauge in Cambria Township, 0.7 miles (1.1 km) upstream from the river's mouth, the annual mean flow of the river between 1974 and 2005 was 72.5 cubic feet per second (2.05 cubic metres per second). The highest recorded flow during the period was 3,520 cu ft/s (100 m^{3}/s) on June 20, 1993. The lowest recorded flow was less than 0.1 cu ft/s (0.0028 m^{3}/s) on September 17, 1977.

== See also ==
- List of rivers in Minnesota
