= Fieldon Township, Watonwan County, Minnesota =

Fieldon Township, Minnesota
- Township
- Location within the state of Minnesota Fieldon Township, Minnesota (the United States)
- Coordinates: 43°59′9″N 94°26′22″W
- Country: United States
- State: Minnesota
- County: Watonwan

Area
  - Total: 35.9 sq mi (92.9 km^{2})
  - Land: 35.7 sq mi (92.5 km^{2})
  - Water: 0.15 sq mi (0.4 km^{2})
- Elevation: 1,030 ft (314 m)

Population (2000)
  - Total: 246
  - Density: 7.0/sq mi (2.7/km^{2})
- Time zone: UTC-6 (Central (CST))
  - Summer (DST): UTC-5 (CDT)
- FIPS code: 27-21014
- GNIS feature ID: 0664164

Fieldon Township is a township in Watonwan County, Minnesota, United States. The population was 246 at the 2000 census.

== History ==
Fieldon Township was organized in 1868.

== Geography ==
According to the United States Census Bureau, the township has a total area of 35.9 square miles (93 km^{2}), of which 35.7 square miles (92 km^{2}) is land and 0.2 square miles (0.52 km^{2}) (0.45%) is water.

== Demographics ==
As of the census of 2000, there were 246 people, 84 households, and 68 families residing in the township. The population density was 6.9 inhabitants per square mile (2.7/km^{2}). There were 96 housing units at an average density of 2.7 per square mile (1.0/km^{2}). The racial makeup of the township was 97.97% White, 0.41% Native American, and 1.63% from two or more races.

There were 84 households, out of which 42.9% had children under the age of 18 living with them, 71.4% were married couples living together, 3.6% had a female householder with no husband present, and 19.0% were non-families. 10.7% of all households were made up of individuals, and 3.6% had someone living alone who was 65 years of age or older. The average household size was 2.93 and the average family size was 3.15.

In the township the population was spread out, with 30.9% under the age of 18, 5.7% from 18 to 24, 28.5% from 25 to 44, 23.6% from 45 to 64, and 11.4% who were 65 years of age or older. The median age was 34 years. For every 100 females, there were 105.0 males. For every 100 females age 18 and over, there were 100.0 males.

The median income for a household in the township was $54,167, and the median income for a family was $56,000. Males had a median income of $31,000 versus $28,281 for females. The per capita income for the township was $19,001. About 9.5% of families and 9.7% of the population were below the poverty line, including 15.5% of those under the age of eighteen and none of those 65 or over.
