= Madelia Township, Watonwan County, Minnesota =

Madelia Township, Minnesota
- Township
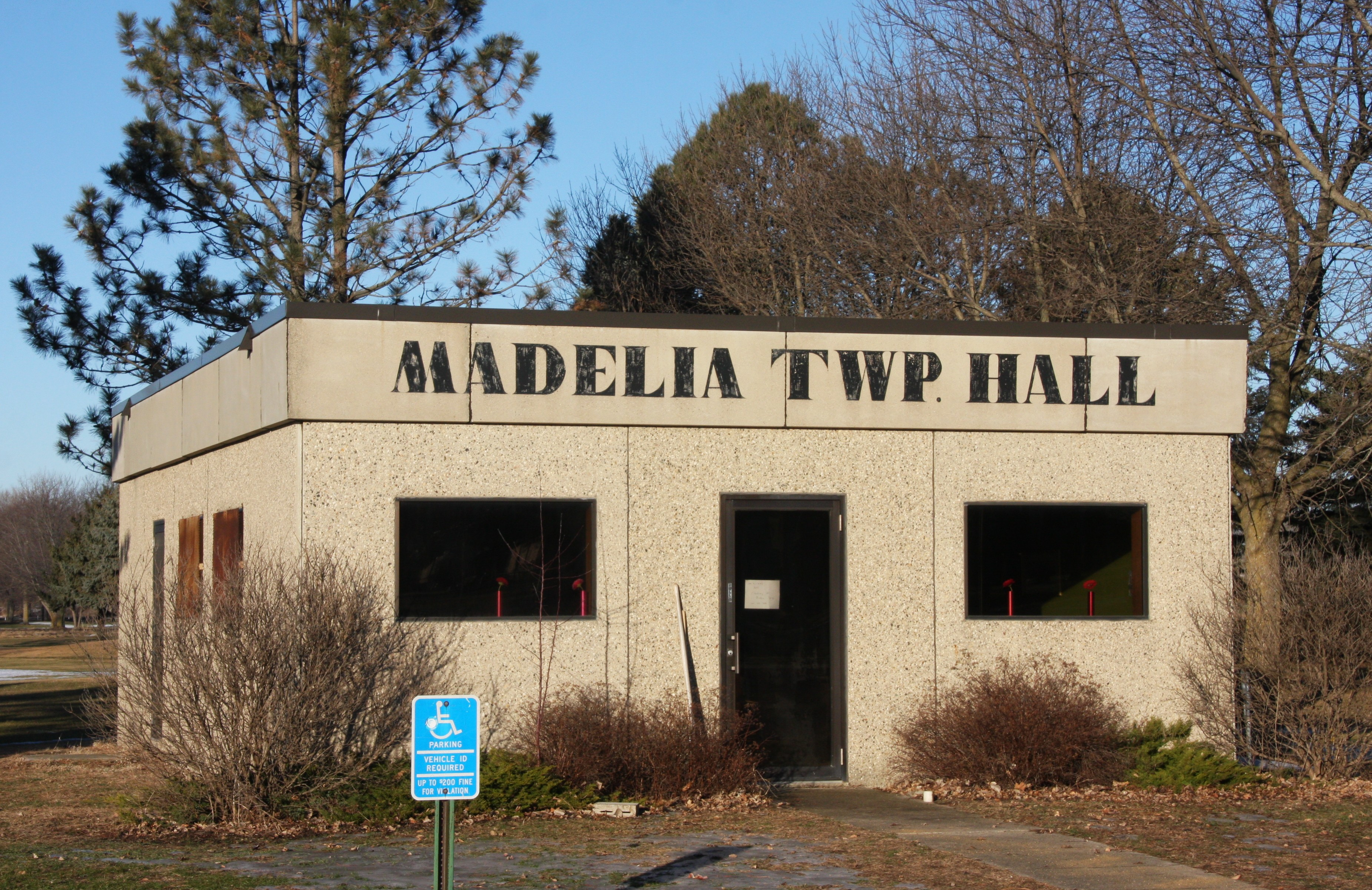
- Madelia Township Hall

- Location within the state of Minnesota Madelia Township, Minnesota (the United States)
- Coordinates: 44°3′29″N 94°26′4″W
- Country: United States
- State: Minnesota
- County: Watonwan

Area
  - Total: 34.5 sq mi (89.4 km^{2})
  - Land: 33.3 sq mi (86.3 km^{2})
  - Water: 1.2 sq mi (3.1 km^{2})
- Elevation: 1,020 ft (311 m)

Population (2000)
  - Total: 393
  - Density: 12/sq mi (4.6/km^{2})
- Time zone: UTC-6 (Central (CST))
  - Summer (DST): UTC-5 (CDT)
- ZIP code: 56062
- Area code: 507
- FIPS code: 27-39248
- GNIS feature ID: 0664869

Madelia Township is a township in Watonwan County, Minnesota, United States. The population was 393 at the 2000 census.

Madelia Township was organized in 1858, and named after its largest settlement, Madelia.

== Geography ==
According to the United States Census Bureau, the township has a total area of 34.5 square miles (89.4 km^{2}), of which 33.3 square miles (86.3 km^{2}) is land and 1.2 square miles (3.1 km^{2}) (3.48%) is water.

== Demographics ==
As of the census of 2000, there were 393 people, 137 households, and 113 families residing in the township. The population density was 11.8 inhabitants per square mile (4.6/km^{2}). There were 142 housing units at an average density of 4.3 per square mile (1.7/km^{2}). The racial makeup of the township was 98.47% White, 0.25% Native American, 0.25% Asian, and 1.02% from two or more races. Hispanic or Latino of any race were 0.51% of the population.

There were 137 households, out of which 40.1% had children under the age of 18 living with them, 74.5% were married couples living together, 3.6% had a female householder with no husband present, and 17.5% were non-families. 16.1% of all households were made up of individuals, and 6.6% had someone living alone who was 65 years of age or older. The average household size was 2.87 and the average family size was 3.19.

In the township the population was spread out, with 30.8% under the age of 18, 5.9% from 18 to 24, 26.7% from 25 to 44, 25.4% from 45 to 64, and 11.2% who were 65 years of age or older. The median age was 38 years. For every 100 females, there were 102.6 males. For every 100 females age 18 and over, there were 106.1 males.

The median income for a household in the township was $48,542, and the median income for a family was $51,250. Males had a median income of $28,438 versus $22,500 for females. The per capita income for the township was $18,969. About 2.0% of families and 2.1% of the population were below the poverty line, including none of those under age 18 and 12.5% of those age 65 or over.
