= Minnesota State Highway 258 =

State highway in Minnesota, United States

Trunk Highway 258
- MN 258 highlighted in red

Route information
- Length: 10.811 mi (17.399 km)
- Existed: July 1, 1949–April 15, 2013

Major junctions
- South end: CSAH 17 at Comfrey
- North end: US 14 at Burnstown Township, near Springfield

Location
- Country: United States
- State: Minnesota
- Counties: Brown

Highway system
- Minnesota Trunk Highway System; Interstate; US; State; Legislative; Scenic
← MN 257	→ MN 263

Minnesota State Highway 258 (MN 258) was a 10.811-mile-long (17.399 km) highway in southwest Minnesota, which ran from its intersection with County State-Aid Highway 17 in Comfrey north to its northern terminus at U.S. Highway 14 in Burnstown Township, four miles east of Springfield.

== Route description ==
Highway 258 served as a north–south connector route in southwest Minnesota between the town of Comfrey and U.S. Highway 14.

Highway 258 crossed the Little Cottonwood River near its intersection with County State-Aid Highway 20 in Bashaw Township. The route crossed the Cottonwood River near its intersection with County State-Aid Highway 24 in Burnstown Township.

== History ==
Highway 258 was authorized on July 1, 1949. The route was paved in 1951. On April 15, 2013, the route was turned over to Brown County. The entire route is now designated and marked as Brown County State-Aid Highway 16.

== Major intersections ==
The entire route was in Brown County.

Location	mi	km	Destinations	Notes
Comfrey	0.000	0.000	CR 17	
Bashaw Township	1.990	3.203	CR 20 west	
Bashaw Township	2.992	4.815	CR 20 east	
Burnstown Township	7.856	12.643	CR 24 east	
Burnstown Township	8.550	13.760	CR 24 west	
Burnstown Township	10.821	17.415	US 14 CR 16 north	
1.000 mi = 1.609 km; 1.000 km = 0.621 mi
