= Stately Township, Brown County, Minnesota =

Township in Minnesota, United States

Stately Township
- Township
- Location within the state of Minnesota Stately Township (the United States)
- Coordinates: 44°9′31″N 95°1′49″W
- Country: United States
- State: Minnesota
- County: Brown

Area
  - Total: 36.1 sq mi (93.4 km^{2})
  - Land: 35.9 sq mi (93.1 km^{2})
  - Water: 0.077 sq mi (0.2 km^{2})
- Elevation: 1,119 ft (341 m)

Population (2000)
  - Total: 206
  - Density: 5.7/sq mi (2.2/km^{2})
- Time zone: UTC-6 (Central (CST))
  - Summer (DST): UTC-5 (CDT)
- FIPS code: 27-62590
- GNIS feature ID: 0665702

Stately Township is a township in Brown County, Minnesota, United States. The population was 206 as of the 2000 census. Stately Township was organized in 1879.

== Geography ==
According to the United States Census Bureau, the township has a total area of 36.0 square miles (93.3 km^{2}), of which 36.0 square miles (93.1 km^{2}) is land and 0.1 square miles (0.2 km^{2}) (0.22%) is water.

=== Unincorporated community ===
- Dotson at 44.1719029°N 94.9947119°W

=== Adjacent townships ===
- North Star Township (north)
- Burnstown Township (northeast)
- Bashaw Township (east)
- Selma Township, Cottonwood County (southeast)
- Delton Township, Cottonwood County (south)
- Amboy Township, Cottonwood County (southwest)
- Germantown Township, Cottonwood County (west)

=== Cemeteries ===
The township includes Christ Lutheran Cemetery.

== Demographics ==
As of the census of 2000, there were 206 people, 67 households, and 54 families residing in the township. The population density was 5.7 people per square mile (2.2/km^{2}). There were 74 housing units at an average density of 2.1/sq mi (0.8/km^{2}). The racial makeup of the township was 96.60% White, 2.91% Asian, 0.49% from other races. Hispanic or Latino of any race were 3.40% of the population.

There were 67 households, out of which 46.3% had children under the age of 18 living with them, 74.6% were married couples living together, 3.0% had a female householder with no husband present, and 19.4% were non-families. 16.4% of all households were made up of individuals, and 7.5% had someone living alone who was 65 years of age or older. The average household size was 3.07 and the average family size was 3.46.

In the township the population was spread out, with 31.6% under the age of 18, 9.7% from 18 to 24, 24.3% from 25 to 44, 22.3% from 45 to 64, and 12.1% who were 65 years of age or older. The median age was 34 years. For every 100 females, there were 108.1 males. For every 100 females age 18 and over, there were 135.0 males.

The median income for a household in the township was $39,583, and the median income for a family was $48,438. Males had a median income of $31,000 versus $26,875 for females. The per capita income for the township was $20,458. About 8.8% of families and 14.1% of the population were below the poverty line, including 25.8% of those under the age of eighteen and none of those 65 or over.
