= Minnesota State Highway 15 =

State highway in Minnesota, United States

Trunk Highway 15
- MN 15 highlighted in red

Route information
- Maintained by MnDOT
- Length: 154.322 mi (248.357 km)
- Existed: 1920–present
- Tourist routes: Minnesota River Valley Scenic Byway

Major junctions
- South end: Iowa 15 at Silver Lake Township
- I-90 at Fairmont; MN 30 near Lewisville; MN 60 at Madelia; US 14 at New Ulm; US 212 near Brownton; MN 7 / MN 22 at Hutchinson; US 12 at Dassel; MN 24 / MN 55 at Kimball; I-94 at St. Cloud; MN 23 at St. Cloud
- North end: US 10 at Sauk Rapids Township

Location
- Country: United States
- State: Minnesota
- Counties: Martin, Watonwan, Brown, Nicollet, Sibley, McLeod, Meeker, Stearns, Benton

Highway system
- Minnesota Trunk Highway System; Interstate; US; State; Legislative; Scenic
← US 14	→ MN 16

Minnesota State Highway 15 (MN 15) is a 154.322-mile-long (248.357 km) highway in south-central and central Minnesota, which runs from Iowa Highway 15 at the Iowa state line and continues north to its northern terminus at its interchange with U.S. Highway 10 outside of Sartell and Sauk Rapids, north of St. Cloud.

== Route description ==
MN 15 serves as a north–south highway between Fairmont, Madelia, New Ulm, Hutchinson, and St. Cloud in south-central and central Minnesota.

MN 15 parallels MN 4 throughout its route in south-central and central Minnesota.

Flandrau State Park is located near MN 15 in Brown County on the Cottonwood River. The park is located just south of New Ulm.

MN 15 is a four-lane highway on the west side of St. Cloud from Interstate 94 (I-94) to U.S. Highway 10 (US 10). MN 15 crosses the Bridge of Hope at the Mississippi River between Sartell and Sauk Rapids.

== History ==
MN 15 was authorized in 1920, 1933, and 1950.

The section of MN 15 between New Ulm and the Iowa state line was originally Minnesota Constitutional Route 15, dating back to 1920.

The section of MN 15 between St. Cloud and Kimball was originally part of Constitutional Route 24.

The middle section of MN 15 was authorized in 1933, the northernmost section in 1950. This northerly section was originally part of old MN 152 and was routed through downtown St. Cloud. Now, it bypasses central St. Cloud to the west side of town.

By 1940, only two short gravel sections of MN 15 remained, both paved by 1953.

In the 1970s, MN 15 through the St. Cloud area was planned to be constructed as a freeway, providing a high-speed connection between I-94 and US 10. However, funding fell short of completing the freeway beyond MN 23 and County Road 75 (CR 75, 2nd Street South). As a result, it was eventually decided that right-of-way needed to build interchanges would be sold off so the remaining segment of MN 15 across the Mississippi River, connecting to US 10, could be built. Therefore, from 2nd Street South to US 10, the highway is currently built as an expressway with signalized intersections. As of now, MN 15 is able to serve traffic, with stretches posted at a 65 mph (105 km/h) speed limit. However, continuing increases in traffic in the St. Cloud area will require the highway to be eventually converted to a freeway in the long term (post 2030).

== Major intersections ==
All exits are unnumbered.

County	Location	mi	km	Destinations	Notes
Martin	Silver Lake Township	0.000	0.000	Iowa 15 south – Armstrong	Continuation into Iowa
Martin	Fairmont	10.486	16.876	I-90 BL west / CSAH 26 – Downtown	Southern end of I-90 Bus. overlap; formerly US 16
Martin	Fairmont	12.351	19.877	I-90 BL ends / I-90 – Blue Earth, Jackson	Interchange; northern end of I-90 Bus. overlap; I-90 exit 102
Watonwan	Antrim Township	27.276	43.896	MN 30 east – Amboy	Southern end of MN 30 overlap
Watonwan	Fieldon Township	33.380	53.720	MN 30 / MN 60 west – St. James	Parclo interchange; northern end of MN 30 overlap; northbound left exit and southbound entrance
Watonwan	Fieldon Township	33.442	53.820	MN 60 / MN 30 west – St. James	Interchange; southern end of MN 60 overlap; southbound left exit and northbound left entrance
Watonwan	Madelia Township	37.513– 37.559	60.371– 60.445	CSAH 9 – Madelia	South end of freeway
Watonwan	Madelia Township	38.776	62.404	CSAH 3 – Madelia	
Watonwan	Madelia Township	39.201	63.088	MN 60 east – Mankato	Northern end of MN 60 overlap; north end of freeway
Brown	Linden Township	45.354	72.990	MN 257 west – Hanska	
Brown	Cottonwood Township	54.635	87.927	MN 68 east / Minnesota River Valley Scenic Byway – Mankato	Southern end of MN 68 overlap
Brown	New Ulm	58.862	94.729	US 14 / MN 68 west (Broadway north) – Sleepy Eye	Northern end of MN 68 overlap; southern end of US 14 overlap
Brown	New Ulm	59.304	95.441	Front Street	Interchange via connector road at roundabout; formerly a folded diamond interchange
Minnesota River		59.671	96.031	Bridge No. 9200	
Nicollet	Courtland Township	60.252	96.966	US 14 east / CSAH 21 / Minnesota River Valley Scenic Byway – Mankato	Dumbbell interchange, opened December 2019; northern end of US 14 overlap; CSAH 21 west is Minnesota River Valley Scenic Byway west
Sibley	Winthrop	76.546	123.189	MN 19 – Winthrop, Gaylord, Fairfax	
McLeod	Sumter Township	89.155	143.481	US 212 – Glencoe, Hector	
McLeod	Hutchinson	101.288	163.007	MN 7 / MN 22	
Meeker	Dassel	115.079	185.202	US 12 – Dassel, Litchfield	
Meeker	Kingston Township	126.028	202.822	MN 24 west – Litchfield	Southern end of MN 24 overlap
Stearns	Kimball	131.529	211.675	MN 24 east / MN 55 – Annandale, Eden Valley	Northern end of MN 24 overlap
Stearns	St. Cloud–Waite Park line	145.059	233.450	I-94 (US 52) – Minneapolis, St. Paul, Moorhead	South end of freeway; cloverleaf interchange; I-94 exits 167A-B
Stearns	St. Cloud–Waite Park line			CSAH 84 (33rd Street South) / Granite Parkway	Dumbbell interchange
Stearns	St. Cloud	149.070	239.905	MN 23 west / CSAH 75 east (2nd Street South) / I-94 Alt.	At-grade intersection; north end of freeway; southern end of MN 23 overlap
Stearns	St. Cloud	149.314	240.298	MN 23 east (Division Street)	Northern end of MN 23 overlap
Stearns	St. Cloud–Sartell line	151.670	244.089	CSAH 120 – Sartell	Diverging diamond interchange, converted from existing intersection on October 17, 2013
Mississippi River		153.940– 154.263	247.742– 248.262	Bridge of Hope	
Benton	Sauk Rapids	152.929	246.115	CSAH 33 (Benton Drive) – Sauk Rapids	Interchange
Benton	Sartell	153.956	247.768	CSAH 29 / I-94 Alt. east to US 10 east	
Benton	Sartell	154.322	248.357	US 10 west	Interchange; no access to US 10 east; northern terminus
1.000 mi = 1.609 km; 1.000 km = 0.621 mi: Concurrency terminus; Incomplete access
