= Dotson, Minnesota =

Unincorporated community in Minnesota, US

Dotson
- Unincorporated community
- Location within Minnesota Location within the United States
- Country: United States
- State: Minnesota
- County: Brown
- Elevation: 1,083 ft (330 m)
- Time zone: UTC-6 (Central (CST))
  - Summer (DST): UTC-5 (CDT)
- Area code: 507
- GNIS feature ID: 654676

Dotson is an unincorporated community in Brown County, Minnesota, United States.

== History ==
Dotson was a community located in Section 12 of Stately Township, Brown County, Minnesota, established in 1899 by the Western Town Lot Company, a division of the Chicago and Northwestern Railway. Originally named Bedford after a town in Massachusetts home to one of the surveyors, the town name was changed to Dotson in 1901 after Enoch Dotson, an early settler in the nearby area of Sanborn.

In the early years of its existence, Dotson was home to two general stores, a railway depot, post office, lumberyard, creamery, bank, school, dance hall, and a number of homes. In 1905, only a few years after the town was founded, the Post Office would close. The school, built in 1921, remained open through 1964. The Dotson Farmer's Elevator closed in 1954. By 1963, all but nine residents remained in Dotson, all of which were members of the nearby Balbach family.

Today, only the school, a brick vault from the Dotson Bank, and a building that once housed an implement dealer remain. In 2019, the Brown County Historical Society unveiled an historic marker to remember the City of Dotson.
