= Prairieville Township, Brown County, Minnesota =

Township in Minnesota, United States

Prairieville Township
- Township
- Location within the state of Minnesota Prairieville Township (the United States)
- Coordinates: 44°19′8″N 94°48′59″W
- Country: United States
- State: Minnesota
- County: Brown

Area
  - Total: 34.4 sq mi (89.0 km^{2})
  - Land: 34.4 sq mi (89.0 km^{2})
  - Water: 0 sq mi (0.0 km^{2})
- Elevation: 1,014 ft (309 m)

Population (2000)
  - Total: 346
  - Density: 10/sq mi (3.9/km^{2})
- Time zone: UTC-6 (Central (CST))
  - Summer (DST): UTC-5 (CDT)
- FIPS code: 27-52342
- GNIS feature ID: 0665351

Prairieville Township is a township in Brown County, Minnesota, United States. The population was 346 as of the 2000 census.

== History ==
Prairieville Township was organized in 1870, and named from the prairie contained within its borders.

== Geography ==
According to the United States Census Bureau, the township has a total area of 34.4 square miles (89.0 km^{2}), of which 34.3 square miles (89.0 km^{2}) is land and 0.03% is water.

The city of Evan and the northeast half of the city of Cobden are within the township geographically but are separate entities.

=== Major highways ===
- U.S. Highway 14
- Minnesota State Highway 68

=== Adjacent townships ===
- Eden Township (north)
- Home Township (east)
- Stark Township (southeast)
- Leavenworth Township (south)
- Burnstown Township (southwest)
- Brookville Township, Redwood County (west)
- Morgan Township, Redwood County (northwest)

=== Cemeteries ===
The township includes Prairieville Cemetery.

== Demographics ==
As of the census of 2000, there were 346 people, 119 households, and 94 families residing in the township. The population density was 10.1 people per square mile (3.9/km^{2}). There were 122 housing units at an average density of 3.6/sq mi (1.4/km^{2}). The racial makeup of the township was 100.00% White.

There were 119 households, out of which 40.3% had children under the age of 18 living with them, 75.6% were married couples living together, 1.7% had a female householder with no husband present, and 20.2% were non-families. 17.6% of all households were made up of individuals, and 6.7% had someone living alone who was 65 years of age or older. The average household size was 2.91 and the average family size was 3.35.

In the township the population was spread out, with 29.5% under the age of 18, 9.0% from 18 to 24, 24.3% from 25 to 44, 25.4% from 45 to 64, and 11.8% who were 65 years of age or older. The median age was 36 years. For every 100 females, there were 109.7 males. For every 100 females age 18 and over, there were 119.8 males.

The median income for a household in the township was $33,542, and the median income for a family was $47,500. Males had a median income of $29,583 versus $31,750 for females. The per capita income for the township was $16,206. About 4.7% of families and 6.8% of the population were below the poverty line, including 7.5% of those under age 18 and none of those age 65 or over.
