= Flandrau =

Flandrau may refer to:

- Flandrau, a planet in the List of minor planets: 18001–19000#301
- Flandrau State Park, a state park in Minnesota
- Charles Flandrau (disambiguation)
- Grace Flandrau, an American writer

== See also ==
- Flandreau (disambiguation)
