= Bashaw =

Bashaw may refer to:

== Places ==
Canada

- Bashaw, Alberta
  - Bashaw Airport

United States

- Bashaw, Wisconsin, a town
- Bashaw, Burnett County, Wisconsin, an unincorporated community
- Bashaw Township, Brown County, Minnesota

== Others ==
- Bashaw (surname)
  - Mose Bashaw (1889–1933), an American football tackle
- Bashaw, another name for the Flathead catfish
  - USS Bashaw (SS-241), a Gato-class submarine named for the fish
- Bashaw (Matthew Cotes Wyatt), a marble sculpture by Matthew Cotes Wyatt
- Pasha or bashaw, a rank in the Ottoman Empire
