= Bashaw (surname) =

Bashaw is a surname. Notable people with the surname include:

- Curtis Bashaw (born 1960), American real estate developer
- Eugene D. Bashaw (1846-1922), family historian and founder of Alberta town, after whom Bashaw, Alberta was named
- Howard Bashaw (born 1957), Canadian musician
- Mose Bashaw (1889 – 1933), American football tackle

== See also ==
- Bashaw (disambiguation)
- Bashaw, Alberta, Canada
- Bashaw Township, Brown County, Minnesota, US
- Bashaw, Wisconsin, US
- Cecile Vashaw (1909-1985), American composer
