= North Star Township, Brown County, Minnesota =

Township in Minnesota, United States

North Star Township
- Township
- Location within the state of Minnesota North Star Township (the United States)
- Coordinates: 44°13′40″N 95°3′29″W
- Country: United States
- State: Minnesota
- County: Brown

Area
  - Total: 35.4 sq mi (91.6 km^{2})
  - Land: 35.4 sq mi (91.6 km^{2})
  - Water: 0 sq mi (0.0 km^{2})
- Elevation: 1,030 ft (314 m)

Population (2000)
  - Total: 325
  - Density: 9.1/sq mi (3.5/km^{2})
- Time zone: UTC-6 (Central (CST))
  - Summer (DST): UTC-5 (CDT)
- FIPS code: 27-47248
- GNIS feature ID: 0665170

North Star Township is a township in Brown County, Minnesota, United States. The population was 325 as of the 2000 census.

== History ==
North Star Township was organized in 1873. It took its name from the state motto of Minnesota, "L'Étoile du Nord".

== Geography ==
According to the United States Census Bureau, the township has a total area of 35.4 square miles (91.6 km^{2}). Only 0.03% of the township is water.

The west quarter of the city of Springfield is within the township geographically but is a separate entity.

=== Major highway ===
- U.S. Highway 14

=== Adjacent townships ===
- Sundown Township, Redwood County (north)
- Brookville Township, Redwood County (northeast)
- Burnstown Township (east)
- Stately Township (south)
- Germantown Township, Cottonwood County (southwest)
- Charlestown Township, Redwood County (west)
- Willow Lake Township, Redwood County (northwest)

=== Cemeteries ===
The township includes North Star Cemetery.

== Demographics ==
As of the census of 2000, there were 325 people, 105 households, and 93 families residing in the township. The population density was 9.2 people per square mile (3.5/km^{2}). There were 110 housing units at an average density of 3.1/sq mi (1.2/km^{2}). The racial makeup of the township was 97.85% White, 0.62% Asian, 0.92% from other races, and 0.62% from two or more races. Hispanic or Latino of any race were 0.92% of the population.

There were 105 households, out of which 39.0% had children under the age of 18 living with them, 82.9% were married couples living together, 3.8% had a female householder with no husband present, and 11.4% were non-families. 10.5% of all households were made up of individuals, and 2.9% had someone living alone who was 65 years of age or older. The average household size was 3.10 and the average family size was 3.34.

In the township the population was spread out, with 32.6% under the age of 18, 4.3% from 18 to 24, 28.0% from 25 to 44, 24.6% from 45 to 64, and 10.5% who were 65 years of age or older. The median age was 34 years. For every 100 females, there were 98.2 males. For every 100 females age 18 and over, there were 104.7 males.

The median income for a household in the township was $45,938, and the median income for a family was $48,750. Males had a median income of $28,125 versus $24,250 for females. The per capita income for the township was $20,308. About 5.4% of families and 5.5% of the population were below the poverty line, including 10.9% of those under age 18 and none of those age 65 or over.
