= Bridge of Hope (disambiguation) =

Bridge of Hope could refer to:

- Bridge of Hope, a bridge across the Mississippi River in the U.S. state of Minnesota
- A recording by The Alfee, a popular Japanese musical group
