= Bashaw Township, Brown County, Minnesota =

Township in Minnesota, United States

Bashaw township
- Township
- Location within the state of Minnesota Bashaw township (the United States)
- Coordinates: 44°9′25″N 94°55′14″W
- Country: United States
- State: Minnesota
- County: Brown

Area
  - Total: 35.8 sq mi (92.6 km^{2})
  - Land: 35.8 sq mi (92.6 km^{2})
  - Water: 0 sq mi (0.0 km^{2})
- Elevation: 1,050 ft (320 m)

Population (2010)
  - Total: 243
  - Density: 7.3/sq mi (2.8/km^{2})
- Time zone: UTC-6 (Central (CST))
  - Summer (DST): UTC-5 (CDT)
- FIPS code: 27-03826
- GNIS feature ID: 0663517

Bashaw Township is a township in Brown County, Minnesota, United States. The population was 243 as of the 2010 census.

== History ==
Bashaw Township was organized in 1874. It was named for Joseph Baschor, an early settler.

== Geography ==
According to the United States Census Bureau, the township has a total area of 35.8 square miles (93 km^{2}), of which 35.8 square miles (93 km^{2}) is land and 0.03% is water.

The city of Comfrey is within the township geographically but is a separate entity.

== Lakes ==
There are no lakes in Bashaw Township, however Altermatt Lake lies just outside the northeast corner of the township.

=== Adjacent townships ===
- Burnstown Township (north)
- Leavenworth Township (northeast)
- Mulligan Township (east)
- Adrian Township, Watonwan County (southeast)
- Selma Township, Cottonwood County (south)
- Delton Township, Cottonwood County (southwest)
- Stately Township (west)

=== Cemeteries ===
The township includes the following cemeteries: Faith and Moravian.

== Demographics ==
As of the census of 2000, there were 255 people, 97 households, and 76 families residing in the township. The population density was 7.1 people per square mile (2.8/km^{2}). There were 102 housing units at an average density of 2.9/sq mi (1.1/km^{2}). The racial makeup of the township was 99.61% White, and 0.39% from two or more races.

There were 97 households, out of which 35.1% had children under the age of 18 living with them, 75.3% were married couples living together, 1.0% had a female householder with no husband present, and 21.6% were non-families. 19.6% of all households were made up of individuals, and 7.2% had someone living alone who was 65 years of age or older. The average household size was 2.63 and the average family size was 3.05.

In the township the population was spread out, with 26.7% under the age of 18, 4.7% from 18 to 24, 26.7% from 25 to 44, 27.5% from 45 to 64, and 14.5% who were 65 years of age or older. The median age was 39 years. For every 100 females, there were 112.5 males. For every 100 females age 18 and over, there were 120.0 males.

The median income for a household in the township was $39,500, and the median income for a family was $42,031. Males had a median income of $27,656 versus $20,500 for females. The per capita income for the township was $16,604. About 4.1% of families and 3.3% of the population were below the poverty line, including none of those under the age of eighteen and 14.3% of those 65 or over.
