= Burnstown Township, Brown County, Minnesota =

Township in Minnesota, United States

Burnstown Township
- Township
- Location within the state of Minnesota Burnstown Township (the United States)
- Coordinates: 44°14′40″N 94°55′27″W
- Country: United States
- State: Minnesota
- County: Brown

Area
  - Total: 34.9 sq mi (90.4 km^{2})
  - Land: 34.7 sq mi (89.9 km^{2})
  - Water: 0.19 sq mi (0.5 km^{2})
- Elevation: 1,040 ft (317 m)

Population (2000)
  - Total: 260
  - Density: 7.5/sq mi (2.9/km^{2})
- Time zone: UTC-6 (Central (CST))
  - Summer (DST): UTC-5 (CDT)
- FIPS code: 27-08776
- GNIS feature ID: 0663709

Burnstown Township is a township in Brown County, Minnesota, United States. The population was 260 as of the 2000 census.

== History ==
Burnstown Township was organized in 1871. It was named for J. F. Burns, an early settler.

== Geography ==
According to the United States Census Bureau, the township has a total area of 34.9 square miles (90 km^{2}), of which 34.7 square miles (90 km^{2}) is land and 0.2 square miles (0.52 km^{2}) (0.60%) is water.

The eastern three-quarters of the city of Springfield is within the township geographically but is a separate entity.

=== Major highway ===
- U.S. Highway 14

=== Lake ===
- Boise Lake

=== Adjacent townships ===
- Brookville Township, Redwood County (north)
- Prairieville Township (northeast)
- Leavenworth Township (east)
- Bashaw Township (south)
- Stately Township (southwest)
- North Star Township (west)
- Sundown Township, Redwood County (northwest)

=== Cemeteries ===
The township includes the following cemeteries: Saint Paul, Saint Rachael, Saint Raphael and Springfield.

== Demographics ==
As of the census of 2000, there were 260 people, 106 households, and 75 families residing in the township. The population density was 7.5 inhabitants per square mile (2.9/km^{2}). There were 119 housing units at an average density of 3.4 per square mile (1.3/km^{2}). The racial makeup of the township was 99.62% White and 0.38% Asian. Hispanic or Latino of any race were 0.38% of the population.

There were 106 households, out of which 32.1% had children under the age of 18 living with them, 66.0% were married couples living together, 0.9% had a female householder with no husband present, and 29.2% were non-families. 26.4% of all households were made up of individuals, and 10.4% had someone living alone who was 65 years of age or older. The average household size was 2.45 and the average family size was 2.96.

In the township the population was spread out, with 26.5% under the age of 18, 9.2% from 18 to 24, 21.9% from 25 to 44, 25.4% from 45 to 64, and 16.9% who were 65 years of age or older. The median age was 40 years. For every 100 females, there were 126.1 males. For every 100 females age 18 and over, there were 127.4 males.

The median income for a household in the township was $34,375, and the median income for a family was $42,500. Males had a median income of $30,469 versus $18,750 for females. The per capita income for the township was $18,919. About 8.1% of families and 5.5% of the population were below the poverty line, including 4.4% of those under the age of eighteen and none of those 65 or over.
