= Searles, Minnesota =

Unincorporated community in Minnesota, US

Searles
- Census-designated place
- Location within Minnesota
- Coordinates: 44°13′51″N 94°26′10″W
- Country: United States
- State: Minnesota
- County: Brown

Area
  - Total: 0.44 sq mi (1.13 km^{2})
  - Land: 0.44 sq mi (1.13 km^{2})
  - Water: 0 sq mi (0.00 km^{2})
- Elevation: 991 ft (302 m)

Population (2020)
  - Total: 192
  - Density: 438.6/sq mi (169.34/km^{2})
- Time zone: UTC-6 (Central (CST))
  - Summer (DST): UTC-5 (CDT)
- ZIP code: 56084
- Area code: 507
- GNIS feature ID: 2628691

Searles is an unincorporated community and census-designated place in Brown County, Minnesota, United States. Searles is located on Minnesota State Highway 15, 6 miles (9.7 km) south of New Ulm. Searles has a post office with ZIP code 56084. As of the 2020 census, Searles had a population of 192.

== History ==
Searles was platted in 1899. A post office was established at Searles in 1902.

== Demographics ==
Historical population
Census	Pop.	Note	%±
2020	192		—
U.S. Decennial Census
