= Leavenworth, Minnesota =

Unincorporated community in Minnesota, US

Leavenworth
- Unincorporated community
- Location within Minnesota Location within the United States
- Coordinates: 44°13′21″N 94°48′07″W
- Country: United States
- State: Minnesota
- County: Brown
- Township: Leavenworth Township
- Elevation: 1,004 ft (306 m)
- Time zone: UTC-6 (Central (CST))
  - Summer (DST): UTC-5 (CDT)
- ZIP code: 56087
- Area code: 507
- GNIS feature ID: 646567

Leavenworth is an unincorporated community located in Leavenworth Township in Brown County, Minnesota, United States. The elevation is 1,004 feet. It was situated on two locations in Brown County, one before the Dakota War of 1862 (section 14 of the township, near Cottonwood River), and in section 27 of the township along the Cottonwood River after the war.

== History ==
Mississippi Indians (Chocktaw) migrated from the south to the Leavenworth area, settling near bodies of water where there were fish and water. River banks and the areas around lakes provided timber that was used for fuel. Later, when people began to homestead on area lands, they settled along the banks of the Cottonwood River.

Located along the Shetek Trail, an east-west wagon trail, Leavenworth was organized on April 16, 1857 and platted that year in section 14. It was probably named for Colonel Henry Leavenworth, a commander who in 1819 established the fort now called Fort Snelling. John B. Calkins' log cabin was built about 1857, and the following year he became the postmaster at Leavenworth.

Leavenworth was attacked early in the Dakota War of 1862. A rescue party dispatched to Leavenworth from New Ulm to check on friends and family reported found the corpses of murdered settlers and wounded children. The wounded were sent to New Ulm by wagon, but the rescue party arrived at New Ulm to find the Battles of New Ulm already underway and was itself attacked. The Joseph Brown family, among others were killed in Leavenworth Township on the Shetek Trail in August 1862 by the Dakota people. historic marker about the Brown family's experience during the war exists about one mile west of the current Leavenworth location; the original Leavenworth location (section 14) was abandoned as a result of the conflict.

Later, settlers established a second Leavenworth, Minnesota in section 27. The settlement, established on the land owned by Rose and George and Windschitl, was located along the Big Cottonwood River. The settlers established businesses, including a general store, blacksmith shop, school, flour mill, sawmill, druggist, and physician. A church was established in the 1860s, the Church of the Japanese Martyrs. A historic marker was established in Leavenworth on County Road 24, .1 miles east of County Road 8 to provide historical information about the settlement.

In the 1870s, a railroad line was established that bypassed the Leavenworth community. The population of the town dwindled until the only commercial buildings in the mid-1880s were a mill and saloon. After periods where the post office was closed, it finally closed in 1902. Leavenworth failed to thrive in the late 19th century and early 20th century, but there were two stores, the Mathiowetz shop, a rectory, the Japanese Martyrs Church, a schoolhouse, and a cemetery in the 1930s and 1940s. A convent and a new school opened there in 1953.
