= Ruth Seeger =

Ruth Seeger may refer to:

- Ruth Crawford Seeger (1901–1953), American modernist composer
- Ruth Taubert Seeger (1924–2014), American athlete and coach
