= Bachelor Lake =

Bachelor Lake may refer to:

- Bachelor Lake (Lac Bachelor), in Quebec, Canada, a lake in the same drainage basin as Lake Waswanipi in Nord-du-Québec
- Bachelor Lake, a small lake near Live Oak, Florida, U.S.
- Bachelor Lake, near Farm Island Township, Aitkin County, Minnesota, U.S.
- Bachelor Lake (Brown County, Minnesota), U.S.

== See also ==
- Bachelor's Lake in the Hiawatha National Forest in Michigan, U.S.
