= Flandreau (disambiguation) =

Flandreau may refer to:

- Flandreau, South Dakota, a city in Moody County
- Flandreau Creek, a river in Minnesota and South Dakota

== See also ==
- Flandrau (disambiguation)
- Flandreau Santee Sioux Tribe
- Flandreau Indian Reservation
- Flandrau State Park
