= North Star Township, Minnesota =

North Star Township is the name of some places in the U.S. state of Minnesota:

- North Star Township, Brown County, Minnesota
- North Star Township, St. Louis County, Minnesota
