= Leavenworth Township, Brown County, Minnesota =

Township in Minnesota, United States

Leavenworth Township
- Township
- Location within the state of Minnesota Leavenworth Township (the United States)
- Coordinates: 44°15′1″N 94°48′59″W
- Country: United States
- State: Minnesota
- County: Brown

Area
  - Total: 35.4 sq mi (91.6 km^{2})
  - Land: 35.1 sq mi (90.9 km^{2})
  - Water: 0.27 sq mi (0.7 km^{2})
- Elevation: 1,020 ft (311 m)

Population (2000)
  - Total: 336
  - Density: 9.6/sq mi (3.7/km^{2})
- Time zone: UTC-6 (Central (CST))
  - Summer (DST): UTC-5 (CDT)
- FIPS code: 27-36116
- GNIS feature ID: 0664741

Leavenworth Township is a township in Brown County, Minnesota, United States. The population was 336 as of the 2000 census.

== History ==
Leavenworth Township was organized in 1859.

== Geography ==
According to the United States Census Bureau, the township has a total area of 35.4 square miles (92 km^{2}), of which 35.1 square miles (91 km^{2}) is land and 0.3 square miles (0.78 km^{2}) (0.76%) is water.

The southeast half of the city of Cobden is within the township geographically but is a separate entity.

=== Unincorporated community ===
- Leavenworth at 44.222459°N 94.801929°W

=== Major highway ===
- U.S. Highway 14

=== Lake ===
- Altermatt Lake (vast majority)

=== Adjacent townships ===
- Prairieville Township (north)
- Home Township (northeast)
- Stark Township (east)
- Mulligan Township (south)
- Bashaw Township (southwest)
- Burnstown Township (west)
- Brookville Township, Redwood County (northwest)

=== Cemetery ===
The township includes Mielke Cemetery.

== Demographics ==
As of the census of 2000, there were 336 people, 120 households, and 93 families residing in the township. The population density was 9.6 people per square mile (3.7/km^{2}). There were 125 housing units at an average density of 3.6/sq mi (1.4/km^{2}). The racial makeup of the township was 98.81% White, 0.89% from other races, and 0.30% from two or more races. Hispanic or Latino of any race were 0.60% of the population.

There were 120 households, out of which 40.0% had children under the age of 18 living with them, 69.2% were married couples living together, 4.2% had a female householder with no husband present, and 21.7% were non-families. 20.0% of all households were made up of individuals, and 4.2% had someone living alone who was 65 years of age or older. The average household size was 2.80 and the average family size was 3.26.

In the township the population was spread out, with 31.5% under the age of 18, 4.2% from 18 to 24, 28.6% from 25 to 44, 24.4% from 45 to 64, and 11.3% who were 65 years of age or older. The median age was 39 years. For every 100 females, there were 138.3 males. For every 100 females age 18 and over, there were 125.5 males.

The median income for a household in the township was $40,313, and the median income for a family was $42,500. Males had a median income of $27,321 versus $19,643 for females. The per capita income for the township was $19,796. About 6.1% of families and 7.4% of the population were below the poverty line, including 7.4% of those under age 18 and 9.4% of those age 65 or over.

== Sources ==
- United States National Atlas
- United States Census Bureau 2007 TIGER/Line Shapefiles
- United States Board on Geographic Names (GNIS)
