= Godahl Store =

- Nelson and Albin Cooperative Mercantile Association Store
- U.S. National Register of Historic Places
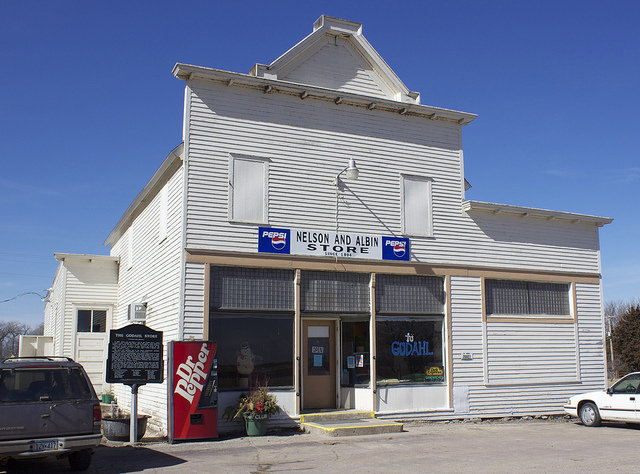
- The Godahl Store from the southeast

- Location within Minnesota Location within the United States
- Location: 26027 Godahl Street, Godahl, Minnesota
- Coordinates: 44°6′31.2″N 94°38′23″W
- Area: .5 acres (0.20 ha)
- Built: 1894–96
- NRHP reference No.: 86003599
- Added to NRHP: January 7, 1987

The Godahl Store is a historic consumers' co-operative general store established in the unincorporated community of Godahl in 1894. It was listed on the National Register of Historic Places as the Nelson and Albin Cooperative Mercantile Association Store in 1987 for its local significance to commerce. The store was in business through 2016.

== Description ==
The Godahl Store's original wing is two stories with a false front and gable roof. A one-story addition wraps around the rear and north side of the store. Both portions are wood frame with clapboard siding. A one-story, wood-frame warehouse stands behind the store.

== History ==
The Godahl Store originated in a rural farming district on the border of Watonwan and Brown County, an area settled by Scandinavian immigrants in the 1870s. Isolated from the nearest towns by a full day's wagon journey, the local residents had limited access to distribute their agricultural products or purchase manufactured goods. They first collaborated on a cooperative enterprise in 1891, establishing a creamery at the crossroads community of Godahl. This proved successful, so three years later a public meeting was held to propose a cooperative commercial venture as well. Taking its name from Nelson and Albin Townships that Godahl straddled, the Nelson and Albin Cooperative Mercantile Association was formally established on April 20, 1894. With bylaws written in Norwegian and shares available at $20, the association contracted with ten men to construct a store opposite the Godahl creamery.

The Godahl Store was completed in August 1894 and stocked groceries, dry goods, and tools. It bought local produce and resold goods acquired in St. James and La Salle. In 1895 a warehouse was added to store hardware like nails and fencing, and the following year the main building was expanded with an addition wrapping around the north side and rear.

The Godahl Store became the nucleus of the dispersed community. It served as the local post office and became a central gathering place for meetings and social events. In 1905 the store installed one of the first telephones in the area, and later housed a branch of the Watonwan County Library.

The exterior was modified in 1916. The building's false-front façade and small south addition were likely added at this time. The creamery failed in 1956 as dairy farming subsided in the area, so the mercantile bought the building as a warehouse for feed, seed, and fertilizer.

== See also ==
- National Register of Historic Places listings in Watonwan County, Minnesota
