= Lefty Bertrand =

American baseball player (1909-2002)

- Pitcher
- Born: February 28, 1909; Cobden, Minnesota, U.S.
- Died: March 17, 2002 (aged 93); The Dalles, Oregon, U.S.
- Batted: Right Threw: Left

MLB debut
- April 15, 1936, for the Philadelphia Phillies

Last MLB appearance
- April 15, 1936, for the Philadelphia Phillies

MLB statistics
- Win–loss record: 0–0
- Earned run average: 9.00
- Strikeouts: 1
- Stats at Baseball Reference

Teams
- Philadelphia Phillies (1936)

Roman Mathias "Lefty" Bertrand (February 28, 1909 – March 17, 2002) was an American Major League Baseball pitcher. Bertrand played one game for the Philadelphia Phillies in 1936. On April 15, he pitched the final two innings of the Phillies' 12–4 loss to the Boston Bees at Shibe Park surrendering 2 earned runs while striking out 1.
