= Plum Creek (Cottonwood River tributary) =

Stream in Minnesota, United States

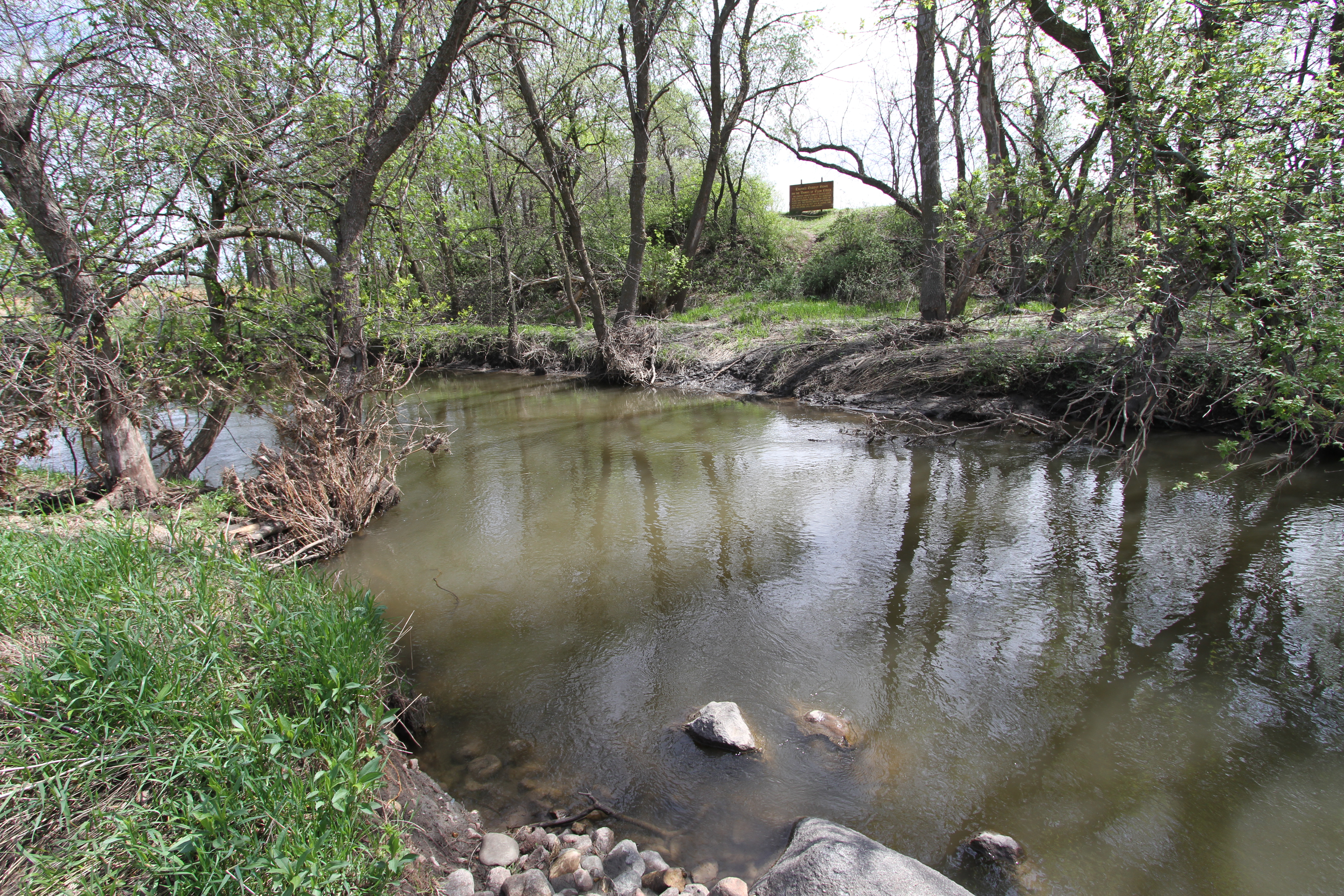
- Ingalls Family Dugout Site on the banks of Plum Creek

- Plum Creek runs northwest from Walnut Grove
- Etymology: wild plum (Prunus americana)
- Native name: Kaŋtaota (Dakota)

Location
- Country: United States
- State: Minnesota
- County: Redwood, Murray

Physical characteristics
- Source
  - coordinates: 44.1757923°N 95.6022311°W
- Mouth
  - location: Cottonwood River
  - coordinates: 44.2492°N 95.4639°W
- Length: 35.4 mi (57.0 km)

Basin features
- Progression: Cottonwood→ Minnesota→ Mississippi→ Gulf of Mexico
- River system: Minnesota River

Plum Creek is a 35.4-mile-long (57.0 km) stream near the city of Walnut Grove, Minnesota. It passes to the northwest of the town, flowing northeasterly to the Cottonwood River, with its waters then flowing to the Minnesota River and eventually the Mississippi River. Plum Creek lends its name to a regional library network.

== History ==
Plum Creek was so named on account of the wild plum (Prunus americana) trees along its course. It was known to the native Sioux as Kaŋ-ta-'o-ta ("plenty of plums").

It is known for being close to the homestead of the Ingalls family of Little House on the Prairie fame, and features in the book On the Banks of Plum Creek. It is also mentioned in the sixth Little House on the Prairie book.

== See also ==
- List of rivers of Minnesota
- List of longest streams of Minnesota
