= Bachelor Lake (Brown County, Minnesota) =

Natural lake in the U.S.

- Location within Minnesota
- Location: Brown County, Minnesota
- Coordinates: 44.256°N 94.652°W
- Type: Lake
- Surface elevation: 1,004 feet (306 m)
- Settlements: Sleepy Eye

Bachelor Lake is a lake in Brown County, Minnesota in the northeastern part of Stark township. Covering 79.80 acres, it is an officially protected water of the State of Minnesota. The lake is within the Cottonwood River Major Watershed. The lake’s elevation is 1,004 feet (306 m), and it is zoned as a shoreland area which is regulated as a shoreland management water.

Bachelor Lake was named for an unmarried homesteader who lived in Stark Township, Brown County, Minnesota.

In the spring of 2016, the Minnesota DNR utilized Bachelor Lake as a rearing pond for walleye. Approximately 5,000 fry per littoral acre (an acre that is less than 15 feet deep) were stocked in Bachelor Lake. The fall harvest following the stocking of walleye fry produced 538 pounds (244 kg) of fingerlings.

== See also ==
- Lakes of Minnesota
- List of fishes of Minnesota
