= Godahl, Minnesota =

Unincorporated community in Minnesota, US

Godahl
- Unincorporated community
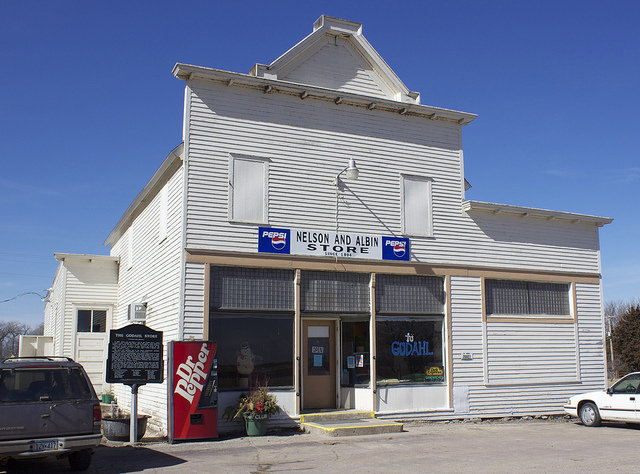
- The Godahl General Store

- Location within Minnesota Location within the United States
- Coordinates: 44°06′32″N 94°38′24″W
- Country: United States
- State: Minnesota
- County: Brown; Watonwan
- Elevation: 1,043 ft (318 m)
- Time zone: UTC-6 (Central (CST))
  - Summer (DST): UTC-5 (CDT)
- ZIP code: 56081
- Area code: 507
- GNIS feature ID: 654726

Godahl is an unincorporated community in Brown and Watonwan counties in the U.S. state of Minnesota.

== Location ==
Godahl sits on the boundary line for Brown and Watonwan counties, occupying two counties. The community is located between Sleepy Eye and St. James on Minnesota State Highway 4. The community is located at the junction of Minnesota State Highway 4 with County Roads 6 and 10.

== History ==
Godahl was settled by Norwegian immigrants and named in honor of their home, called Gode Dahl ("Good Valley"). The town had a post office from 1894 until 1907, and a station of the Chicago, St. Paul, Minneapolis and Omaha Railway. The community failed to develop, and for many years the only remnant of its commercial aspirations was the Godahl Store, a cooperative built in 1894 and now listed on the National Register of Historic Places. The store closed on December 31, 2016.
