= Silas Blackman =

American politician

Member of the Minnesota House of Representatives from the 8th district
- In office 1883–1887
- Succeeded by: William R. Estes

Personal details
- Born: 1835 New York
- Died: 1926 (aged 90–91)
- Occupation: Farmer, legislator

Silas Blackman (1835–1926), also described as Silas Blackmun, was a state representative for Minnesota's 8th district serving Cottonwood and Watonwan counties. He was born in New York in 1835 and died in 1926. He served in the Minnesota House of Representatives' 23rd and 24th legislative sessions from 1883 to 1887. He was succeeded by William R. Estes. Blackman came to Minnesota in 1863 and was a resident of Selma Township when he was elected in 1882.
