= Minnesota State Highway 257 =

State highway in Minnesota, United States

Trunk Highway 257
- MN 257 highlighted in red

Route information
- Maintained by MnDOT
- Length: 3.991 mi (6.423 km)
- Existed: July 1, 1949–present

Major junctions
- West end: CSAH 20 at Hanska
- East end: MN 15 at Linden Township

Location
- Country: United States
- State: Minnesota
- Counties: Brown

Highway system
- Minnesota Trunk Highway System; Interstate; US; State; Legislative; Scenic
← MN 254	→ MN 258

Minnesota State Highway 257 (MN 257) is a 3.991-mile-long (6.423 km) highway in southwest Minnesota, which runs from its intersection with Brown County State-Aid Highway 20 (Broadway Avenue) in the city of Hanska and continues east to its eastern terminus at its intersection with State Highway 15 in Linden Township, 6 miles north of Madelia.

== Route description ==
Highway 257 serves as a short east–west connector route in southwest Minnesota between the city of Hanska and State Highway 15.

It passes around the north side of Linden Lake in Linden Township.

The route is legally defined as Route 257 in the Minnesota Statutes.

== History ==
Highway 257 was authorized on July 1, 1949.

The route was paved in 1950.

== Major intersections ==
The entire route is in Brown County.

Location	mi	km	Destinations	Notes
Hanska	0.000	0.000	CR 20 (Broadway Avenue)	
Linden Township	3.986	6.415	MN 15	
1.000 mi = 1.609 km; 1.000 km = 0.621 mi
