= Silver Lake Township, Martin County, Minnesota =

Silver Lake Township, Minnesota
- Township
- Interactive map of Silver Lake Township, Minnesota
- Coordinates: 43°32′28″N 94°26′6″W
- Country: United States
- State: Minnesota
- County: Martin

Area
  - Total: 37.3 sq mi (96.6 km^{2})
  - Land: 34.9 sq mi (90.4 km^{2})
  - Water: 2.4 sq mi (6.1 km^{2})
- Elevation: 1,211 ft (369 m)

Population (2000)
  - Total: 494
  - Density: 14/sq mi (5.5/km^{2})
- Time zone: UTC-6 (Central (CST))
  - Summer (DST): UTC-5 (CDT)
- ZIP code: 56031
- Area code: 507
- FIPS code: 27-60412
- GNIS feature ID: 0665616

Silver Lake Township is a township in Martin County, Minnesota, United States. The population was 494 at the 2000 census.

Silver Lake Township was named for its north and south Silver lakes.

== Geography ==
According to the United States Census Bureau, the township has a total area of 96.6 km^{2} (37.3 mi^{2}), of which 90.4 km^{2} (34.9 mi^{2}) is land and 6.1 km^{2} (2.4 mi^{2}) (6.36%) is water.

== Demographics ==
As of the census of 2000, there were 494 people, 190 households, and 148 families residing in the township. The population density was 5.5/km^{2} (14.1/mi^{2}). There were 204 housing units at an average density of 2.3/km^{2} (5.8/mi^{2}). The racial makeup of the township was 99.80% White, and 0.20% from two or more races. Hispanic or Latino of any race were 0.40% of the population.

There were 190 households, out of which 29.5% had children under the age of 18 living with them, 75.3% were married couples living together, 2.1% had a female householder with no husband present, and 21.6% were non-families. 18.9% of all households were made up of individuals, and 9.5% had someone living alone who was 65 years of age or older. The average household size was 2.60 and the average family size was 3.01.

In the township the population was spread out, with 25.7% under the age of 18, 5.9% from 18 to 24, 23.5% from 25 to 44, 30.4% from 45 to 64, and 14.6% who were 65 years of age or older. The median age was 43 years. For every 100 females, there were 100.0 males. For every 100 females age 18 and over, there were 108.5 males.

The median income for a household in the township was $35,000, and the median income for a family was $52,031. Males had a median income of $30,417 versus $22,813 for females. The per capita income for the township was $20,496. About 8.8% of families and 9.1% of the population were below the poverty line, including 12.2% of those under age 18 and 5.3% of those age 65 or over.
