= Charles Flandrau =

Charles Flandrau may refer to:

- Charles Eugene Flandrau (1828–1903), American lawyer
- Charles Macomb Flandrau (1871–1938), his son, American writer
