= Ruth Taubert Seeger =

American athlete

Personal information
- Born: May 30, 1924 Evan, Minnesota
- Died: April 13, 2014 (aged 89)
- Education: B.A., Gallaudet University, 1949
- Spouse: Julius Seeger

Sport
- Country: United States
- Sport: Track and field, tennis, volleyball
- Disability: Deafness
Medal record
Bronze medal – third place	1957 Summer Deaflympics	tennis

Ruth Mae Taubert Seeger (May 30, 1924 – April 13, 2014) was an American athlete and coach. She was the first woman to be chosen for the United States track and field team for the 1957 World Games for the Deaf.

Seeger also went on to win a bronze medal for tennis at the 1957 Summer Deaflympics.

== Early life and education ==
Seeger was born on May 30, 1924, in Evan, Minnesota, and grew up in Sleepy Eye. She was the daughter of Olga and William Taubert, and had one brother, Sheldon. At an early age, it was discovered Seeger was deaf. She was inspired by athlete Babe Didrikson Zaharias.

Seeger was educated at Rochester Institute for the Oral, and later Minnesota State School for the Deaf, where she took part in various sports competitions. After graduation, she enrolled at Gallaudet University where she participated in several sporting competitions due to her being a member of the Women's Athletic Association. It was part of Seeger's plan to become a coach and assist other people in achieving their goals in athletics. In 1949 she married Texan-born Julius Seeger one day after she graduated; they had one son, Mark (born 1960).

== Athletic career ==
After completing her studies in 1949 with a bachelor of arts degree, she was selected as the first deaf American woman to compete for the United States track and field team in the 1957 Summer Deaflympics. Seeger took part in the 100-meter and 200-meter dash and high jump events. She also participated in the event's mixed double tennis competition alongside George Timchenko from Duarte, California, where she earned a bronze medal. She organized the first Texas School for the Deaf track and field team for girls seven years later, and in 1973, organized the school's first volleyball team, after she won several championships playing with the Austin Athletic Club. Two years later, Seeger was the woman's coach at the Pan American Games for the Deaf, and founded the Texas School for the Deaf's first softball team in 1986. She had also been the United States women track coach for five events. She entered the 2002 Senior Games of San Antonio, and won the gold medal in the 75–79 category of the field shot put, field discus, javelin, long jump and high jump events. Seeger won her 300th gold medal at the Pittsburgh National Senior Games in 2005, and was later appointed as a commissioner with the Texas Commission for the Deaf. She died on April 13, 2014, after living with Alzheimer's disease.

== Legacy ==
In her career, Seeger amassed 27 medals as a coach to her athletes. She credited her success to her colleagues at Texas School for the Deaf and her husband Julius, but was known to be modest about her achievements. In 1969, Seeger was named "Woman of the Year" at Gallaudet University by the college's Women's Recreation Association, an annual award given to the "devotion, encouragement and self-sacrifice in assisting the deaf". The newspaper Austin American-Statesman recognized Seeger in its "Six Outstanding Women of Austin" in 1972. Sixteen years later, she was inducted into the Texas Women's Hall of Fame by the state's governor Bill Clements. Texas Woman's University stated of her success: "Ruth Taubert Seeger’s contributions to sports, her students, and the role model she has established for thousands of deaf children, are immeasurable".
