= Evan, Minnesota =

City in Minnesota, United States

Evan
- City
- Location of Evan, Minnesota
- Coordinates: 44°21′18″N 94°50′10″W
- Country: United States
- State: Minnesota
- County: Brown

Government
  - Type: Mayor - Council
  - Mayor: Richard Petermann

Area
  - Total: 1.03 sq mi (2.68 km^{2})
  - Land: 1.03 sq mi (2.68 km^{2})
  - Water: 0 sq mi (0.00 km^{2})
- Elevation: 1,024 ft (312 m)

Population (2020)
  - Total: 70
  - Density: 67.8/sq mi (26.16/km^{2})
- Time zone: UTC-6 (Central (CST))
  - Summer (DST): UTC-5 (CDT)
- ZIP code: 56085
- Area code: 507
- FIPS code: 27-19880
- GNIS feature ID: 2394708

Evan is a city in Brown County, Minnesota, United States. As of the 2020 census, Evan had a population of 70.

== History ==
A post office called Evan was established in 1886 and remained in operation until it was discontinued in 1993. Evan was platted in 1887, and incorporated in 1904. The city was named for the first postmaster's wife, Eva.

== Geography ==
According to the United States Census Bureau, the city has a total area of 1.01 square miles (2.62 km^{2}), all land.

== Demographics ==
Historical population
Census	Pop.	Note	%±
1910	112		—
1920	123		9.8%
1930	131		6.5%
1940	145		10.7%
1950	141		−2.8%
1960	153		8.5%
1970	126		−17.6%
1980	90		−28.6%
1990	83		−7.8%
2000	91		9.6%
2010	86		−5.5%
2020	70		−18.6%
U.S. Decennial Census

=== 2010 census ===
As of the census of 2010, there were 86 people, 35 households, and 20 families residing in the city. The population density was 85.1 inhabitants per square mile (32.9/km^{2}). There were 43 housing units at an average density of 42.6 per square mile (16.4/km^{2}). The racial makeup of the city was 90.7% White, 8.1% from other races, and 1.2% from two or more races. Hispanic or Latino of any race were 8.1% of the population.

There were 35 households, of which 34.3% had children under the age of 18 living with them, 42.9% were married couples living together, 2.9% had a female householder with no husband present, 11.4% had a male householder with no wife present, and 42.9% were non-families. 37.1% of all households were made up of individuals, and 11.4% had someone living alone who was 65 years of age or older. The average household size was 2.46 and the average family size was 3.15.

The median age in the city was 36.3 years. 29.1% of residents were under the age of 18; 5.8% were between the ages of 18 and 24; 29.1% were from 25 to 44; 26.7% were from 45 to 64; and 9.3% were 65 years of age or older. The gender makeup of the city was 51.2% male and 48.8% female.

=== 2000 census ===
As of the census of 2000, there were 91 people, 37 households, and 22 families residing in the city. The population density was 90.6 inhabitants per square mile (35.0/km^{2}). There were 42 housing units at an average density of 41.8 per square mile (16.1/km^{2}). The racial makeup of the city was 96.70% White, and 3.30% from two or more races. Hispanic or Latino of any race were 2.20% of the population.

There were 37 households, out of which 32.4% had children under the age of 18 living with them, 43.2% were married couples living together, 5.4% had a female householder with no husband present, and 40.5% were non-families. 32.4% of all households were made up of individuals, and 24.3% had someone living alone who was 65 years of age or older. The average household size was 2.46 and the average family size was 3.14.

In the city, the population was spread out, with 29.7% under the age of 18, 5.5% from 18 to 24, 35.2% from 25 to 44, 11.0% from 45 to 64, and 18.7% who were 65 years of age or older. The median age was 32 years. For every 100 females, there were 78.4 males. For every 100 females age 18 and over, there were 82.9 males.

The median income for a household in the city was $45,000, and the median income for a family was $51,250. Males had a median income of $29,688 versus $22,500 for females. The per capita income for the city was $13,670. There were no families and 4.5% of the population living below the poverty line, including no under eighteens and 26.7% of those over 64.

== Notable person ==
- Ruth Taubert Seeger, athlete and teacher, was born in Evan.

== See also ==
- List of cities in Minnesota
