= Sanborn, Minnesota =

City in Minnesota, United States

Sanborn
- City
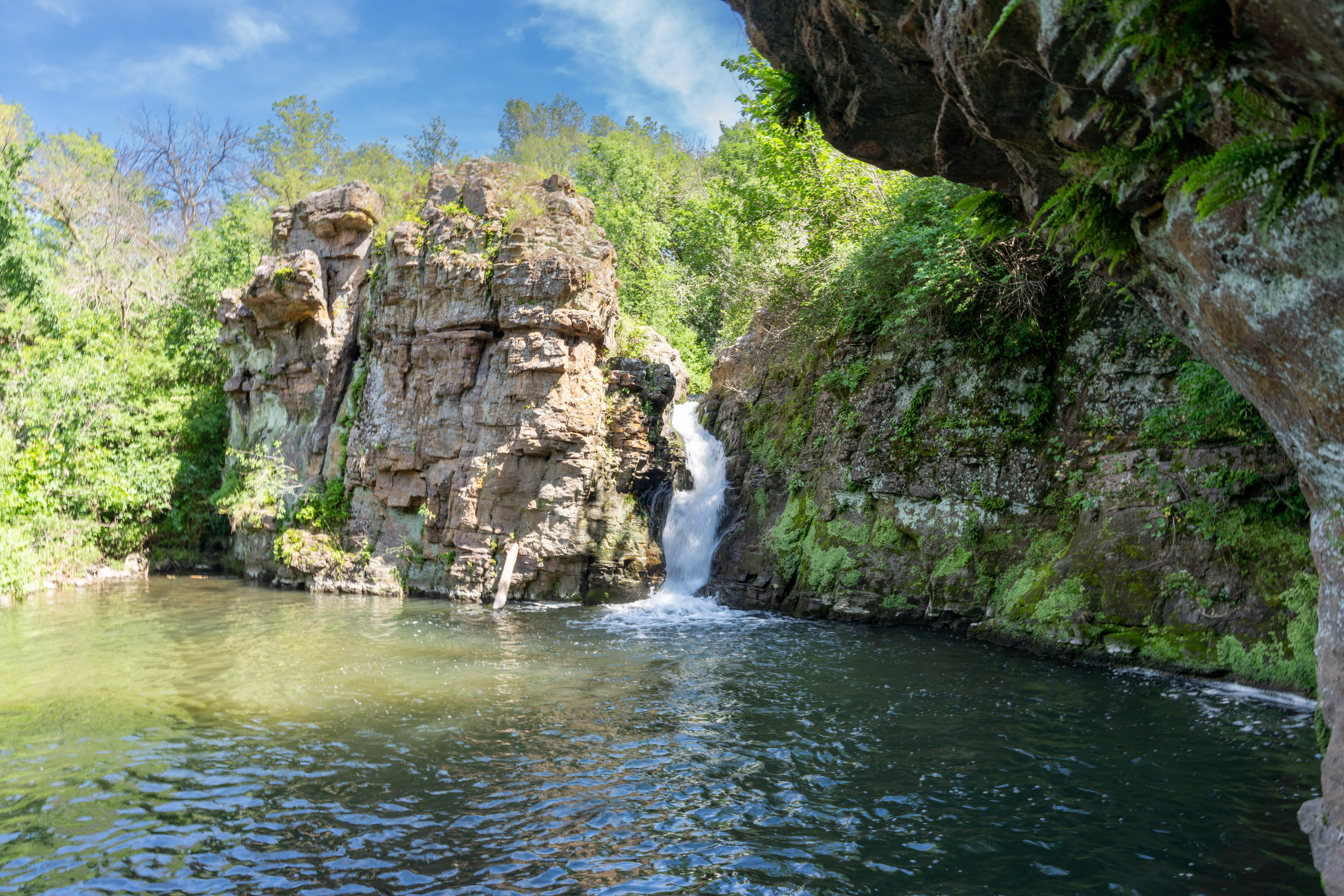
- Red Rock Falls

- Cities and townships of Redwood County
- Coordinates: 44°12′35″N 95°07′46″W
- Country: United States
- State: Minnesota
- County: Redwood

Area
  - Total: 2.12 sq mi (5.50 km^{2})
  - Land: 2.07 sq mi (5.37 km^{2})
  - Water: 0.054 sq mi (0.14 km^{2})
- Elevation: 1,102 ft (336 m)

Population (2020)
  - Total: 323
  - Density: 155.8/sq mi (60.17/km^{2})
- Time zone: UTC-6 (Central (CST))
  - Summer (DST): UTC-5 (CDT)
- ZIP code: 56083
- Area code: 507
- FIPS code: 27-58306
- GNIS feature ID: 2396531
- Website: www.cityofsanbornmn.org

Sanborn is a city in Redwood County, Minnesota, United States. As of the 2020 census, Sanborn had a population of 323.

== Geography ==
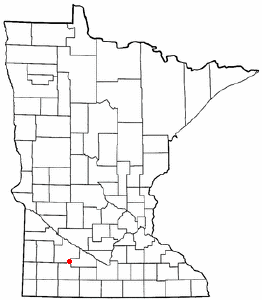
Location of Sanborn, Minnesota

According to the United States Census Bureau, the city has a total area of 2.13 square miles (5.52 km^{2}); 2.08 square miles (5.39 km^{2}) is land and 0.05 square miles (0.13 km^{2}) is water. The Cottonwood River flows through the city.

U.S. Highway 71 runs along the eastern edge of Sanborn, a short distance south of its intersection with U.S. Highway 14.

== History ==
Sanborn was platted in 1881 and incorporated November 17, 1891. It was named in honor of Sherburn Sanborn, who for many years was an officer of the Chicago and Northwestern railway company. Sanborn post office was established May 17, 1880.

== Politics ==
Sanborn is located in Minnesota's 7th congressional district, represented by Republican Michelle Fischbach.

== Demographics ==
Historical population
Census	Pop.	Note	%±
1900	351		—
1910	462		31.6%
1920	487		5.4%
1930	518		6.4%
1940	580		12.0%
1950	613		5.7%
1960	521		−15.0%
1970	505		−3.1%
1980	518		2.6%
1990	459		−11.4%
2000	434		−5.4%
2010	339		−21.9%
2020	323		−4.7%
U.S. Decennial Census

=== 2010 census ===
As of the census of 2010, there were 339 people, 165 households, and 103 families living in the city. The population density was 163.0 inhabitants per square mile (62.9/km^{2}). There were 193 housing units at an average density of 92.8 per square mile (35.8/km^{2}). The racial makeup of the city was 99.4% White and 0.6% from other races. Hispanic or Latino of any race were 3.2% of the population.

There were 165 households, of which 19.4% had children under the age of 18 living with them, 50.3% were married couples living together, 7.9% had a female householder with no husband present, 4.2% had a male householder with no wife present, and 37.6% were non-families. 32.7% of all households were made up of individuals, and 15.7% had someone living alone who was 65 years of age or older. The average household size was 2.05 and the average family size was 2.52.

The median age in the city was 47.7 years. 15.6% of residents were under the age of 18; 9.4% were between the ages of 18 and 24; 21.2% were from 25 to 44; 30.1% were from 45 to 64; and 23.6% were 65 years of age or older. The gender makeup of the city was 48.4% male and 51.6% female.

=== 2000 census ===
As of the census of 2000, there were 434 people, 179 households, and 127 families living in the city. The population density was 203.8 inhabitants per square mile (78.7/km^{2}). There were 199 housing units at an average density of 93.4 per square mile (36.1/km^{2}). The racial makeup of the city was 99.08% White and 0.92% Native American. Hispanic or Latino of any race were 0.69% of the population.

There were 179 households, out of which 31.8% had children under the age of 18 living with them, 60.9% were married couples living together, 6.1% had a female householder with no husband present, and 28.5% were non-families. 27.4% of all households were made up of individuals, and 16.8% had someone living alone who was 65 years of age or older. The average household size was 2.42 and the average family size was 2.93.

In the city, the population was spread out, with 26.3% under the age of 18, 8.3% from 18 to 24, 21.2% from 25 to 44, 22.6% from 45 to 64, and 21.7% who were 65 years of age or older. The median age was 40 years. For every 100 females, there were 100.0 males. For every 100 females age 18 and over, there were 102.5 males.

The median income for a household in the city was $36,375, and the median income for a family was $47,813. Males had a median income of $25,682 versus $21,016 for females. The per capita income for the city was $19,809. About 3.0% of families and 6.5% of the population were below the poverty line, including 4.2% of those under age 18 and 3.8% of those age 65 or over.
