= Altermatt Lake =

Lake in Brown County, Minnesota

- Location within Minnesota
- Location: Brown County, Minnesota, United States
- Coordinates: 44°11′56″N 94°50′48″W
- Type: Natural
- Basin countries: United States
- Surface area: 122.83 acres (497,100 m^{2})
- Surface elevation: 1,007 feet (307 m)
- Settlements: Leavenworth Township

Altermatt Lake is a lake in Brown County, Minnesota, in the United States. It is a protected public lake.

== History ==
Altermatt Lake was named for John B. Altermatt, a Swiss settler. Treml Park is bordered by 4000 feet of the lake's shoreline.

== See also ==
- List of lakes of Minnesota
- List of fishes of Minnesota

== Bibliography ==
County Parks of Minnesota: 300 Parks You Can Visit Featuring 25 Favorites. Timothy J. Engrav
