= Bridge of Hope =

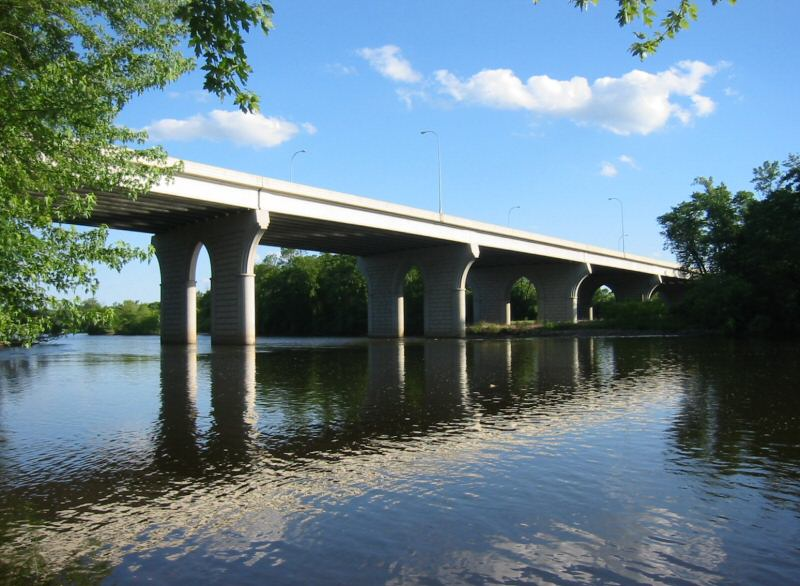
- The Bridge of Hope as viewed from the east bank of the Mississippi, north of the bridge in early-June 2006.
- Coordinates: 45°35′58″N 94°11′16″W
- Carries: Four lanes of MN 15
- Crosses: Mississippi River, BNSF Railway, Benton Drive (Benton County Road 33)
- Locale: Sauk Rapids, Minnesota
- Maintained by: Minnesota Department of Transportation
- ID number: 05011

Characteristics
- Design: Precast concrete girder bridge
- Total length: 1711 feet
- Width: 85 feet
- Longest span: 140 feet
- Clearance below: 18 feet

History
- Opened: 1995

The Bridge of Hope is a concrete girder bridge that spans the Mississippi River between Sartell, Minnesota and Sauk Rapids, Minnesota. The bridge was completed eight months early, aided by favorable weather and trouble-free construction. It was built in 1995 and was designed by Minnesota Department of Transportation and the Jim Hill Group.

The bridge is named in honor of Jacob Wetterling, a boy who was abducted from St. Joseph, Minnesota in 1989 (his remains were discovered in 2016). The name was chosen by a group of high school students who wanted to memorialize Wetterling and other missing children.

== See also ==
- List of crossings of the Upper Mississippi River
