= Flandrau State Park =

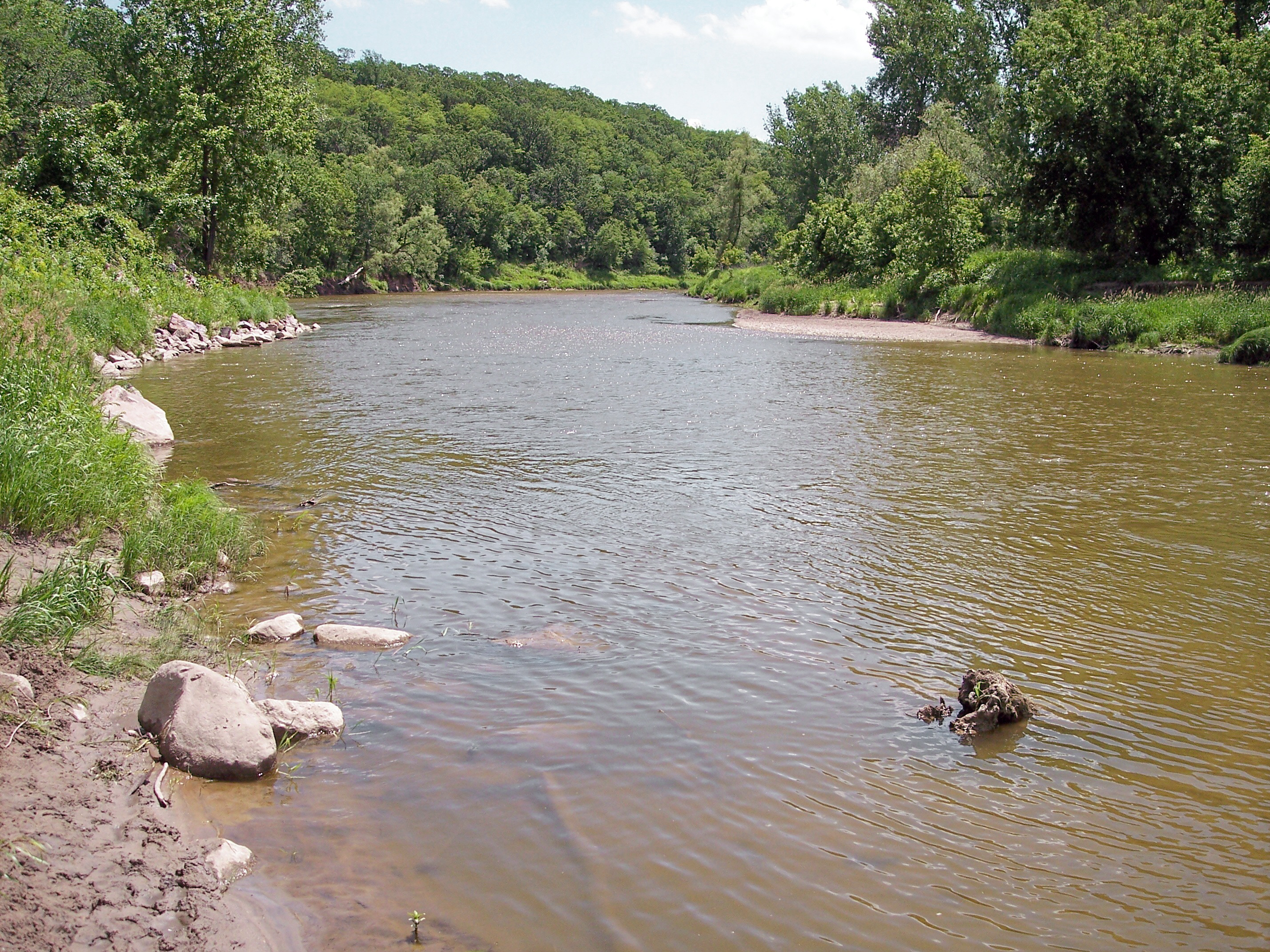
- The Cottonwood River in Flandrau State Park

- Location within Minnesota Location within the United States
- Location: Brown, Minnesota, United States
- Coordinates: 44°17′18″N 94°28′25″W
- Area: 982 acres (397 ha)
- Elevation: 853 ft (260 m)
- Established: 1937
- Named for: Charles Eugene Flandrau
- Governing body: Minnesota Department of Natural Resources

- Flandrau State Park CCC/WPA/Rustic Style Historic Resources
- U.S. National Register of Historic Places
- U.S. Historic district
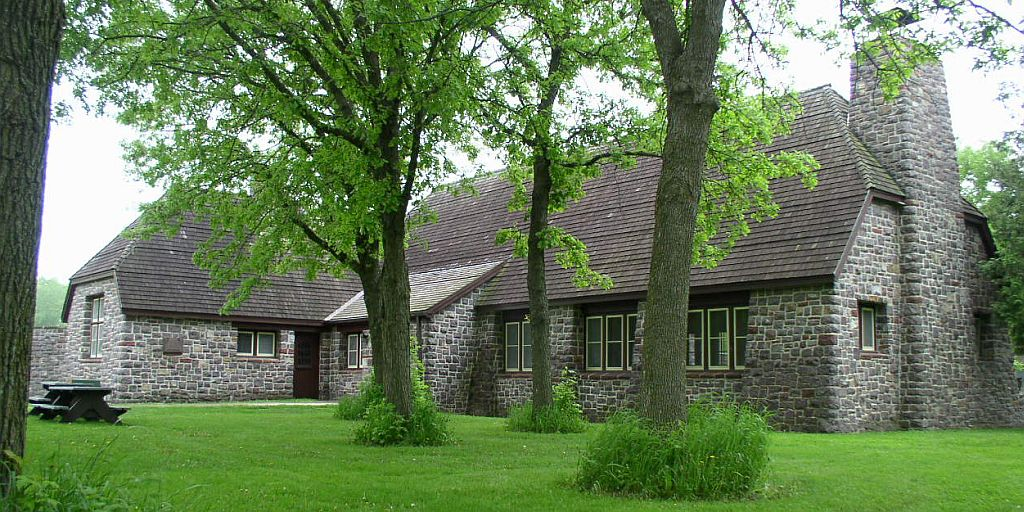
- The beachhouse, with unique German architectural influences
- Location: Brown County, Minnesota, Off Co. Hwy. 13 SE of New Ulm
- Nearest city: New Ulm, Minnesota
- Area: 805 acres (326 ha)
- Built: 1934–1942
- Architect: Edward W. Barber
- Architectural style: National Park Service rustic
- MPS: Minnesota State Park CCC/WPA/Rustic Style MPS
- NRHP reference No.: 89001658
- Added to NRHP: October 25, 1989

Flandrau State Park

Flandrau State Park is a state park of Minnesota, United States, on the Cottonwood River adjacent to the city of New Ulm. Initially called Cottonwood River State Park, it was renamed in 1945 to honor Charles Eugene Flandrau, a leading citizen of early Minnesota who commanded defenses during the Battles of New Ulm in the Dakota War of 1862. The park was originally developed in the 1930s as a job creation project to provide a recreational reservoir. However the dam was repeatedly damaged by floods and was removed in 1995.

Along with the dam, crews from the Civilian Conservation Corps (CCC) and Works Progress Administration (WPA) built several structures in the National Park Service rustic style. In a unique twist on the mandate to harmonize with the local environment, the buildings were designed to reflect the ethnic German heritage of New Ulm. The WPA barracks were reused during World War II as Camp New Ulm, housing German prisoners of war. All of these structures are listed as a district on the National Register of Historic Places.

== Natural history ==
=== Geography ===
Flandrau State Park lies in a small valley carved by the east-flowing Cottonwood River. Marshy oxbow lakes mark the river's former courses along the valley floor. The steep valley walls rise 150–200 feet (46–61 m). The Cottonwood joins the Minnesota River just 1.5 miles (2.4 km) east of the park. It originates 90 miles (140 km) west of the park in Lyon County, Minnesota.

The park boundary largely follows the valley rim. Trees on the slopes generally screen the adjacent development. The northern end of the park, including the campground, is within the city limits of New Ulm. No bridges cross the river within Flandrau, so the parkland on the south bank is not readily accessible. The only development there, the group center, is at the end of a gated road.

=== Geology ===
Flandrau State Park lies atop a bedrock of shale, sandstone, and conglomerate. These sediments accumulated at the bottom of the Western Interior Seaway 100 million years ago during the late Cretaceous period. The fine-grained sandstone is white with bands of orange from iron oxide, and contains fossilized plant material. The conglomerate contains pebbles of granite that had formed 3,000–2,500 million years ago and later eroded into the seaway.

Lying directly atop the Cretaceous rocks is till just a few thousand years old. All intermediate rock had eroded away before the till was deposited in a ground moraine by continental glaciers. Within Flandrau State Park this glacial debris is 100 to 200 feet (30–61 m) thick. While the till contains some rock from Canada and northern Minnesota, most is from the local region. Numerous springs emerge at the base of the till slopes, especially at the western end of the park.

As the northern glaciers melted, the massive Glacial River Warren carved a deep channel for itself. The modern Minnesota River follows the same course, but occupies only a fraction of the former riverbed. Its tributaries must drop from the surrounding plains into the broad valley to reach their base level. This is why the Cottonwood River, a placid prairie stream for most of its length, plunges into such a deep valley near its mouth. The Cottonwood's downcutting has carved all the way through the thick glacial till and a few feet into the Cretaceous bedrock below. There may once have been a waterfall on the Cottonwood River, which eroded into rapids before achieving the steady gradient of modern times.

=== Flora ===
The vegetation of Flandrau State Park is representative of the Upper Minnesota River Country Biocultural Region. Although the surrounding tallgrass prairie is gone, the forested river valley remains similar to times before European settlement.

The valley floor supports marshes and wet prairie interspersed with bottomland hardwood forest of willow, eastern cottonwood, American elm, silver maple, and green ash. The steep valley walls bear northern hardwood forest, although the cooler, moister north-facing slopes favor sugar maple, basswood, and common hackberry while the drier south slopes are characterized by bur oak, eastern red cedar, and aspen. A few dry, sunny knolls support prairie characterized by big bluestem and indian grass.

The park's plant communities have been altered since Euro-American settlement. Without periodic wildfires to thin woody plants, the valleyside forests have gotten denser and many prairie openings have filled in with sumac. Many elm trees were lost to Dutch elm disease. The valley floor is largely secondary forest, having been cleared for agriculture and then submerged under a reservoir.

=== Fauna ===
Surrounded by human development, Flandrau is an important refuge for local wildlife. The 25 species of mammals seen in the park include white-tailed deer, coyotes, gray foxes, raccoons, beavers, skunks, opossums, and minks. Over 168 species of birds have been documented in the park. Many of these are birds migrating through rather than nesting. These include many warblers, flycatchers, vireos, and thrushes.

The Cottonwood River supports a few game fish — notably northern pike and smallmouth bass — and a greater variety of rough fish.

== Cultural history ==
Archaeological evidence found outside the park confirms that prehistoric Native Americans inhabited the Cottonwood River valley. A few sites were as much as 7,000 years old, though most were 2,000 years old or less. At the time of European contact in the mid-17th century the area was home to the Dakota. Pioneers began settling the Cottonwood Valley in the 1830s. In less than a century, though, the valley floor was largely abandoned due to the periodic flooding.

=== State park creation ===
To help combat unemployment during the Great Depression, federal funding was dedicated to park development throughout the United States. The Cottonwood River valley was selected as it was in a well-populated region with no other large recreational area or lakes. Moreover, the land was largely abandoned and seemingly in need of flood control structures. The state of Minnesota purchased the property in 1934. The first Works Progress Administration (WPA) enrollees arrived in September, living in tents while they built bunkhouses, a mess hall, and an administrative building over the winter. Mostly middle-aged skilled workers, the WPA men quarried stone and constructed three park buildings: a beachhouse, a manager's residence, and a garage.

A second workforce arrived in June 1935, establishing its own camp in the southwest corner of the park. These were less-skilled workers hired through the Civilian Conservation Corps (CCC). They built the dam and its earthen dikes, constructed a kitchen shelter, landscaped, planted trees, and blazed trails. WPA and CCC workers cleared trees out of the lakebed. For the first year the laborers were World War I veterans from the Veterans Conservation Corps (VCC). In July 1936 they transferred to other Minnesota state parks and were replaced with the unemployed young men more typical of CCC projects.

The dam, completed in 1937 after two years of work, impounded a reservoir of 209 acres (85 ha). The WPA continued to work in the park until 1941 and the CCC until 1942. As planned, the WPA camp was converted to a group center while the CCC camp was razed.

The stone structures built by the WPA have been called " the most unusual architectural designs in the state park system" by the Minnesota Historical Society. A principle of the rustic style was to harmonize with the local environment, generally by using local materials. In this case, however, architect Edward W. Barber chose to reflect local culture as well, honoring the strong German heritage of New Ulm. The park buildings evoke the architecture of Germany with steeply pitched roofs, dormers, chimneys, casement windows with small panes, and fine nonlinear stonework. The beachhouse is also one of the largest New Deal structures in the Minnesota state park system.

=== Camp New Ulm ===
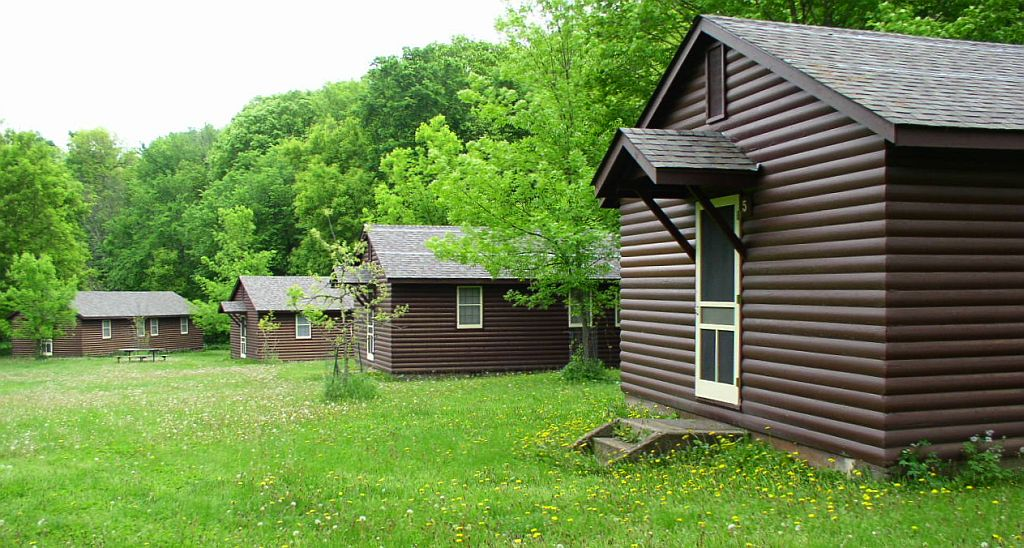
The park's group center, where German prisoners of war were housed during World War II

During World War II, the empty group camp built by the WPA was used to house German prisoners of war in the United States. Late in the war, Great Britain was short on space and resources to provide for captured enemy combatants; meanwhile, much of the U.S. labor force was off serving in the military. The U.S. established camps throughout the country from which 450,000 POWs were employed in non-defense industries. Nine POW camps were established in Minnesota — including one other state park, Whitewater — all managed from a regional headquarters in Algona, Iowa.

About 160 German POWs arrived at Camp New Ulm in June 1944. Mostly members of the Luftwaffe (the German Air Force), they ranged in age from 18 to 25. Twelve men from the U.S. Army served as their guards.

The POWs primarily worked in the nearby town of Sleepy Eye at a cannery, which paid the rent on the camp. After the harvest season, prisoners worked at brick and tile factories and a poultry processing plant. Ochs Brick in Springfield was one. Small groups were hired out to local farms, unguarded, as short-term farmworkers. The POWs spent the winter at the regional main camp in Algona and returned in spring 1945. That year their use on farms expanded considerably, encompassing worksites in eight counties, while prisoners at the cannery were instrumental in packing Sleepy Eye's largest-ever pea crop.

The location of Camp New Ulm outside a town with a strong German heritage was a lucky break for the POWs. Many locals still spoke German and were sympathetic toward the prisoners (and hoping in many cases for news of relatives and the old country). German-speaking church officials held Lutheran and Catholic services in the camp and gathered donations of reading material. Although the guards warned civilians that they were not to have contact with the POWs, food was slipped over the fence, cannery workers shared ice cream and beer, and young women waded across the river at night to flirt at the camp's edge. POWs out on weeklong farm details fared best of all, often receiving full home-cooked meals at the family dinner table.

Prisoner Helmut Lichtenberg, who had become friendly with a farm family he'd worked for, arranged to slip out of camp and spend much of a weekend with them. Mindless of the severity of the infraction, the farmer and his mother-in-law drove Lichtenberg into camp Sunday afternoon, where they were stopped by guards. Lichtenberg was punished with solitary confinement; the Americans were ultimately both fined $300 and lectured by the judge. Their testimony indicated that other prisoners undertook such forays, but this was the camp's only documented escape incident.

For recreation the POWs had a clubhouse with a fireplace and library, a camp store, a sport field, and a workshop where they made their own furniture and sporting equipment. They were allowed to swim and fish in part of Cottonwood Lake. Further entertainments included newspapers, radios, and weekly movie screenings. Some musical instruments were gathered, and locals came to listen and sing along to Sunday afternoon concerts.

Camp New Ulm closed in December 1945 and all of the internees were eventually repatriated to Germany. One of the former prisoners later immigrated to the United States, settling in Wisconsin. The camp remains in use as the state park's group center, one of the country's few World War II POW camps that are still maintained. When the camp is not occupied, visitors can ask at the park office to access the grounds.

=== Recent history ===
By World War II, sentiment developed for renaming the park after Charles Flandrau (1828–1903), a notable figure in early Minnesota history. A lawyer, Indian agent, and statesman, Flandrau served on the territorial supreme court, presided over the first court session in Brown County, and led the military defense of New Ulm during the Dakota War of 1862. The name was changed in March 1945.

Two years later the Cottonwood Lake Dam was overtopped and seriously damaged by a flood. It was reconstructed at great expense, but damaged again by flooding in spring 1965. This time federal funds were denied, and the state opted for a shorter dam and a separate swimming pool. However a third damaging flood swept through in 1969. With local opinion divided about reestablishing the recreational lake, the state commissioned an independent study. The engineering consultants reported that, although a restored dam would improve habitat for panfish and block upstream movement of undesirable species such as carp, it would not provide effective flood control. The capacity of the lake basin was too small compared to the watershed, exacerbated by increased agricultural drainage and wetland loss since the original damming in the 1930s. Nor would a new dam be cost-effective for generating hydroelectricity, and the lake would be prone to heavy sedimentation and periods of poor water quality.

The director of the state parks division recommended against rebuilding the dam. Some structures remained for several years; full dam removal took place in 1995 and the Cottonwood River is again free-flowing through the park. As an interpretive sign reads, "the dam that took almost 200 men nearly two years to build was demolished by four men and heavy equipment in five months."

== Recreation ==
Flandrau State Park has 8 miles (13 km) of trails for hiking, walking, and running. Many connect to city streets such as Indian Point Dr. and Summit Ave., so the park experiences significant walk-in traffic. In winter 6 miles of the trails are groomed for cross-country skiing and 2 miles for snowshoeing.

The park maintains three campgrounds with 92 sites total, 34 of which have electrical hookups. There are also three secluded walk-in sites. Visitors can rent two camper cabins or the historic group center, which sleeps up to 110 in eight bunkhouses.

The popular day-use area centers around a unique sand-bottomed, chlorinated swimming pool. This is adjacent to the historic beachhouse and a picnic area with a playground, volleyball and horseshoes facilities, and a reservable shelter.

Most fishing is done at the downstream end of the Cottonwood River, near the park's eastern edge, where the riverbank is most easily accessed.

Flandrau is adjacent to Nehls City Park, the private New Ulm Country Club, and the August Schell Brewing Company. The Hermann Heights Monument and Martin Luther College are within blocks of the park entrance.
