= Germantown Township, Cottonwood County, Minnesota =

Germantown Township, Minnesota
- Township
- Location within the state of Minnesota Germantown Township, Minnesota (the United States)
- Coordinates: 44°9′6″N 95°10′19″W
- Country: United States
- State: Minnesota
- County: Cottonwood

Area
  - Total: 35.8 sq mi (92.8 km^{2})
  - Land: 35.8 sq mi (92.8 km^{2})
  - Water: 0 sq mi (0.0 km^{2})
- Elevation: 1,180 ft (360 m)

Population (2010)
  - Total: 207
  - Density: 5.78/sq mi (2.23/km^{2})
- Time zone: UTC-6 (Central (CST))
  - Summer (DST): UTC-5 (CDT)
- FIPS code: 27-23570
- GNIS feature ID: 0664262

Germantown Township is in Cottonwood County, Minnesota, United States. The population was 207 at the 2010 census.

Germantown Township was organized in 1874. A large share of the early settlers being natives of Germany caused the name to be selected.

== Geography ==
According to the United States Census Bureau, the township has a total area of 35.8 square miles (93 km^{2}), of which 35.8 square miles (93 km^{2}) is land and 0.03% is water.

== Demographics ==
As of the census of 2000, there were 224 people, 80 households, and 65 families residing in the township. The population density was 6.2 inhabitants per square mile (2.4/km^{2}). There were 92 housing units at an average density of 2.6 per square mile (1.0/km^{2}). The racial makeup of the township was 98.66% White, 0.89% African American, 0.45% from other races. Hispanic or Latino of any race were 0.45% of the population.

There were 80 households, out of which 41.3% had children under the age of 18 living with them, 75.0% were married couples living together, 3.8% had a female householder with no husband present, and 18.8% were non-families. 17.5% of all households were made up of individuals, and 11.3% had someone living alone who was 65 years of age or older. The average household size was 2.80 and the average family size was 3.20.

In the township the population was spread out, with 29.9% under the age of 18, 6.3% from 18 to 24, 25.4% from 25 to 44, 23.7% from 45 to 64, and 14.7% who were 65 years of age or older. The median age was 36 years. For every 100 females, there were 98.2 males. For every 100 females age 18 and over, there were 115.1 males.

The median income for a household in the township was $35,893, and the median income for a family was $36,964. Males had a median income of $31,023 versus $22,917 for females. The per capita income for the township was $19,071. About 2.7% of families and 3.9% of the population were below the poverty line, including 3.8% of those under the age of eighteen and 5.1% of those 65 or over.

== Politics ==
Germantown Township is located in Minnesota's 1st congressional district, represented by Jim Hagedorn, a Republican. At the state level, Germantown Township is located in Senate District 22, represented by Republican Doug Magnus, and in House District 22B, represented by Republican Rod Hamilton.
