= Comfrey, Minnesota =

City in Minnesota, United States

Comfrey
- City
- Motto: "Remembering Yesterday, Appreciating Today, Working for Tomorrow"
- Location of Comfrey, Minnesota
- Coordinates: 44°06′40″N 94°54′10″W
- Country: United States
- State: Minnesota
- Counties: Brown, Cottonwood
- platted: 1902

Government
  - Type: Mayor - Council
  - Mayor: Gary Richter

Area
  - Total: 0.43 sq mi (1.11 km^{2})
  - Land: 0.43 sq mi (1.11 km^{2})
  - Water: 0 sq mi (0.00 km^{2})
- Elevation: 1,125 ft (343 m)

Population (2020)
  - Total: 392
  - Density: 915.8/sq mi (353.58/km^{2})
- Time zone: UTC-6 (Central (CST))
  - Summer (DST): UTC-5 (CDT)
- ZIP code: 56019
- Area code: 507
- FIPS code: 27-12772
- GNIS feature ID: 2393615
- Website: https://www.comfreymn.com/

Comfrey is a city in Brown and Cottonwood counties in the U.S. state of Minnesota. The population was 392 at the 2020 census. The majority of the people live in Brown County.

== History ==
Comfrey was platted in 1902. It was named after the plant called comfrey (Symphytini Officinalis), by the first postmaster, A. W. Pederson.

On March 29, 1998, Comfrey was hit by a strong F4 tornado which damaged or destroyed most of the town. While no one was killed, a dozen people were injured.

== Geography ==
According to the United States Census Bureau, the city has a total area of 0.47 square miles (1.22 km^{2}), all land.

== Demographics ==
Historical population
Census	Pop.	Note	%±
1910	238		—
1920	533		123.9%
1930	535		0.4%
1940	555		3.7%
1950	642		15.7%
1960	616		−4.0%
1970	525		−14.8%
1980	548		4.4%
1990	433		−21.0%
2000	367		−15.2%
2010	382		4.1%
2020	392		2.6%
U.S. Decennial Census

=== 2010 census ===
As of the census of 2010, there were 382 people, 169 households, and 110 families residing in the city. The population density was 812.8 inhabitants per square mile (313.8/km^{2}). There were 180 housing units at an average density of 383.0 units per square mile (147.9 units/km^{2}). The racial makeup of the city was 97.1% White, 0.3% African American, and 2.6% from two or more races. Hispanic or Latino of any race were 1.6% of the population.

There were 169 households, of which 28.4% had children under the age of 18 living with them, 56.2% were married couples living together, 5.3% had a female householder with no husband present, 3.6% had a male householder with no wife present, and 34.9% were non-families. 33.7% of all households were made up of individuals, and 20.2% had someone living alone who was 65 years of age or older. The average household size was 2.26 and the average family size was 2.86.

The median age in the city was 44.4 years. 23.3% of residents were under the age of 18; 5.8% were between the ages of 18 and 24; 22.5% were from 25 to 44; 23.6% were from 45 to 64; and 24.9% were 65 years of age or older. The gender makeup of the city was 49.5% male and 50.5% female.

=== 2000 census ===
As of the census of 2000, there were 367 people, 160 households, and 99 families residing in the city. The population density was 871.9 inhabitants per square mile (336.6/km^{2}). There were 171 housing units at an average density of 406.2 units per square mile (156.8 units/km^{2}). The racial makeup of the city was 99.46% White, 0.27% Native American, and 0.27% from two or more races.

There were 160 households, out of which 25.0% had children under the age of 18 living with them, 57.5% were married couples living together, 2.5% had a female householder with no husband present, and 38.1% were non-families. 34.4% of all households were made up of individuals, and 25.0% had someone living alone who was 65 years of age or older. The average household size was 2.22 and the average family size was 2.74.

In the city, the population was spread out, with 24.3% under the age of 18, 6.8% from 18 to 24, 22.1% from 25 to 44, 18.0% from 45 to 64, and 28.9% who were 65 years of age or older. The median age was 44 years. For every 100 females, there were 90.2 males. For every 100 females age 18 and over, there were 95.8 males.

The median income for a household in the city was $30,938, and the median income for a family was $40,625. Males had a median income of $32,045 versus $18,750 for females. The per capita income for the city was $14,878. About 3.8% of families and 10.8% of the population were below the poverty line, including 9.6% of those under age 18 and 4.3% of those age 65 or over.

== Government ==
Comfrey is located in Minnesota's 1st congressional district, represented by Brad Finstad, a Republican. At the state level, Comfrey is located in Senate districts 21 and 22, represented by Republicans Gary Dahms and Bill Weber (politician), and in House districts 21B and 22B, represented by Republicans Paul Torkelson and Rod Hamilton.

== Education ==
Comfrey Public School educates approximately 170 students in grades K-12. The school building was rebuilt in 1999 after being heavily damaged by a tornado.

== Notable person ==
- Glen Taylor, owner of the Minnesota Timberwolves and Minnesota Lynx basketball teams and business billionaire; raised on a farm outside Comfrey.
