= Delton Township, Cottonwood County, Minnesota =

Delton Township, Minnesota
- Township
- Location within the state of Minnesota Delton Township, Minnesota (the United States)
- Coordinates: 44°4′25″N 95°2′44″W
- Country: United States
- State: Minnesota
- County: Cottonwood

Area
  - Total: 35.8 sq mi (92.6 km^{2})
  - Land: 35.7 sq mi (92.5 km^{2})
  - Water: 0 sq mi (0.0 km^{2})
- Elevation: 1,263 ft (385 m)

Population (2010)
  - Total: 123
  - Density: 3.44/sq mi (1.33/km^{2})
- Time zone: UTC-6 (Central (CST))
  - Summer (DST): UTC-5 (CDT)
- FIPS code: 27-15652
- GNIS feature ID: 0663963

Delton Township is a township in Cottonwood County, Minnesota, United States. The population was 123 at the 2010 census.

Delton Township was organized in 1872.

== Geography ==
According to the United States Census Bureau, the township has a total area of 35.7 square miles (92 km^{2}), of which 35.7 square miles (92 km^{2}) is land and 0.03% is water.

== Demographics ==
As of the census of 2000, there were 146 people, 55 households, and 44 families residing in the township. The population density was 4.1 inhabitants per square mile (1.6/km^{2}). There were 58 housing units at an average density of 1.6 per square mile (0.62/km^{2}). The racial makeup of the township was 96.58% White, 0.68% African American, 0.68% Asian, and 2.05% from two or more races. Hispanic or Latino of any race were 0.68% of the population.

There were 55 households, out of which 34.5% had children under the age of 18 living with them, 72.7% were married couples living together, 3.6% had a female householder with no husband present, and 18.2% were non-families. 16.4% of all households were made up of individuals, and 7.3% had someone living alone who was 65 years of age or older. The average household size was 2.65 and the average family size was 2.93.

In the township, the population was spread out, with 24.7% under the age of 18, 7.5% from 18 to 24, 30.1% from 25 to 44, 22.6% from 45 to 64, and 15.1% who were 65 years of age or older. The median age was 38 years. For every 100 females, there were 105.6 males. For every 100 females age 18 and over, there were 115.7 males.

The median income for a household in the township was $41,563, and the median income for a family was $43,000. Males had a median income of $28,125 versus $18,125 for females. The per capita income for the township was $20,666. There were 15.2% of families and 12.8% of the population living below the poverty line, including 23.1% of under eighteens and 8.3% of those over 64.

== Politics ==
Delton Township is located in Minnesota's 1st congressional district, represented by Jim Hagedorn, a Republican. At the state level, Delton Township is located in Senate District 22, represented by Republican Doug Magnus, and in House District 22B, represented by Republican Rod Hamilton.
