= Selma Township, Cottonwood County, Minnesota =

Selma Township, Minnesota
- Township
- Location within the state of Minnesota Selma Township, Minnesota (the United States)
- Coordinates: 44°3′52″N 94°55′48″W
- Country: United States
- State: Minnesota
- County: Cottonwood

Area
  - Total: 36.1 sq mi (93.4 km^{2})
  - Land: 36.1 sq mi (93.4 km^{2})
  - Water: 0 sq mi (0.0 km^{2})
- Elevation: 1,210 ft (370 m)

Population (2010)
  - Total: 193
  - Density: 5.35/sq mi (2.07/km^{2})
- Time zone: UTC-6 (Central (CST))
  - Summer (DST): UTC-5 (CDT)
- FIPS code: 27-59224
- GNIS feature ID: 0665576

Selma Township is a township in Cottonwood County, Minnesota, United States. The population was 193 at the 2010 census.

Selma Township was organized in 1874, and given the name of the first white birth within its borders.

== Geography ==
According to the United States Census Bureau, the township has a total area of 36.1 square miles (93.4 km^{2}), all land.

== Demographics ==
As of the census of 2000, there were 204 people, 84 households, and 64 families residing in the township. The population density was 5.7 people per square mile (2.2/km^{2}). There were 90 housing units at an average density of 2.5/sq mi (1.0/km^{2}). The racial makeup of the township was 92.65% White, 3.92% from other races, and 3.43% from two or more races. Hispanic or Latino of any race were 6.37% of the population.

There were 84 households, out of which 22.6% had children under the age of 18 living with them, 66.7% were married couples living together, 7.1% had a female householder with no husband present, and 23.8% were non-families. 21.4% of all households were made up of individuals, and 7.1% had someone living alone who was 65 years of age or older. The average household size was 2.43 and the average family size was 2.78.

In the township the population was spread out, with 21.6% under the age of 18, 6.4% from 18 to 24, 21.1% from 25 to 44, 24.5% from 45 to 64, and 26.5% who were 65 years of age or older. The median age was 46 years. For every 100 females, there were 104.0 males. For every 100 females age 18 and over, there were 110.5 males.

The median income for a household in the township was $37,250, and the median income for a family was $41,875. Males had a median income of $27,083 versus $19,375 for females. The per capita income for the township was $15,551. About 9.1% of families and 10.8% of the population were below the poverty line, including 15.4% of those under the age of eighteen and 9.8% of those 65 or over.

== Politics ==
Selma Township is located in Minnesota's 7th congressional district, represented by Michelle Fischbach, a Republican. At the state level, Selma Township is located in Senate District 21, represented by Republican Bill Weber (Minnesota politician), and in House District 21A, represented by Republican Joe Schomacker.

== Notable residents ==
- Silas Blackman, Minnesota State representative
