= Mose Bashaw =

American football player (1889–1933)

Profile
- Position: Tackle

Personal information
- Born: April 15, 1889; Huron, New York, U.S.
- Died: June 5, 1933 (aged 44); Chicago, Illinois, U.S.
- Listed height: 5 ft 9 in (1.75 m)
- Listed weight: 200 lb (91 kg)

Career information
- High school: Tilden (Chicago)
- College: None

Career history
- Fort Wayne Friars (1917); Rock Island Independents (1919); Hammond Pros (1920)

Career NFL statistics
- Games played: 3
- Stats at Pro Football Reference

Mose Lafayette Bashaw (April 15, 1889 – June 5, 1933) was an American professional football tackle who played one season in the American Professional Football Association (APFA) with the Hammond Pros.

== Early life ==
Mose Lafayette Bashaw was born on April 15, 1889, in Huron, New York. He attended Tilden High School in Chicago, Illinois. He did not play college football.

== Professional career ==
Bashaw played in nine games, starting eight, for the independent Fort Wayne Friars in 1917.

He played in three games, all starts, for the Rock Island Independents during the 1919 season.

Bashaw played in at least three of the seven games played by the Hammond Pros of the American Professional Football Association (APFA) during the league's inaugural 1920 season. He signed with the Pros again in 1921 but did not play that year. He stood 5'9" and weighed 200 pounds.

== Personal life ==
Bashaw died on June 5, 1933, in Chicago.
