= Cobden, Minnesota =

City in Minnesota, United States

Cobden
- City
- Location of Cobden, Minnesota
- Coordinates: 44°16′57″N 94°50′48″W
- Country: United States
- State: Minnesota
- County: Brown

Government
  - Type: Mayor - Council
  - Mayor: Allen Krebs

Area
  - Total: 0.99 sq mi (2.57 km^{2})
  - Land: 0.99 sq mi (2.57 km^{2})
  - Water: 0 sq mi (0.00 km^{2})
- Elevation: 1,040 ft (320 m)

Population (2020)
  - Total: 36
  - Density: 36/sq mi (14/km^{2})
- Time zone: UTC-6 (Central (CST))
  - Summer (DST): UTC-5 (CDT)
- ZIP code: 56085
- Area code: 507
- FIPS code: 27-12394
- GNIS feature ID: 2393581

Cobden is a city in Brown County, Minnesota, United States. As of the 2020 census, Cobden had a population of 36.

== History ==
A post office was established as Cobden in 1886, and remained in operation until it was discontinued in 1972. Cobden was platted in 1901, and incorporated in 1905. The city was named for Richard Cobden, a British statesman.

== Geography ==
According to the United States Census Bureau, the city has a total area of 0.96 square miles (2.49 km^{2}), all land.

== Demographics ==
Historical population
Census	Pop.	Note	%±
1910	87		—
1920	108		24.1%
1930	108		0.0%
1940	136		25.9%
1950	118		−13.2%
1960	114		−3.4%
1970	113		−0.9%
1980	72		−36.3%
1990	62		−13.9%
2000	61		−1.6%
2010	36		−41.0%
2020	36		0.0%
U.S. Decennial Census

=== 2010 census ===
As of the census of 2010, there were 36 people, 18 households, and 7 families residing in the city. The population density was 37.5 inhabitants per square mile (14.5/km^{2}). There were 20 housing units at an average density of 20.8 per square mile (8.0/km^{2}). The racial makeup of the city was 91.7% White, 2.8% Native American, and 5.6% from two or more races. Hispanic or Latino of any race were 11.1% of the population.

There were 18 households, of which 27.8% had children under the age of 18 living with them, 33.3% were married couples living together, 5.6% had a female householder with no husband present, and 61.1% were non-families. 50.0% of all households were made up of individuals, and 11.2% had someone living alone who was 65 years of age or older. The average household size was 2.00 and the average family size was 2.86.

The median age in the city was 45.5 years. 19.4% of residents were under the age of 18; 2.9% were between the ages of 18 and 24; 25% were from 25 to 44; 41.6% were from 45 to 64; and 11.1% were 65 years of age or older. The gender makeup of the city was 63.9% male and 36.1% female.

=== 2000 census ===
As of the census of 2000, there were 61 people, 23 households, and 18 families residing in the city. The population density was 63.7 inhabitants per square mile (24.6/km^{2}). There were 29 housing units at an average density of 30.3 per square mile (11.7/km^{2}). The racial makeup of the city was 98.36% White, and 1.64% from two or more races.

There were 23 households, out of which 34.8% had children under the age of 18 living with them, 73.9% were married couples living together, 4.3% had a female householder with no husband present, and 21.7% were non-families. 17.4% of all households were made up of individuals, and 8.7% had someone living alone who was 65 years of age or older. The average household size was 2.65 and the average family size was 2.83.

In the city, the population was spread out, with 26.2% under the age of 18, 11.5% from 18 to 24, 32.8% from 25 to 44, 11.5% from 45 to 64, and 18.0% who were 65 years of age or older. The median age was 35 years. For every 100 females, there were 103.3 males. For every 100 females age 18 and over, there were 95.7 males.

The median income for a household in the city was $43,750, and the median income for a family was $48,750. Males had a median income of $29,375 versus $20,625 for females. The per capita income for the city was $15,179. There were 11.1% of families and 6.6% of the population living below the poverty line, including no under eighteens and none of those over 64.

== Notable person ==
- Lefty Bertrand, professional baseball player.

== See also ==
- List of cities in Minnesota
