= Springfield, Minnesota =

City in Minnesota, United States

- City
- Motto: We have a lot to share!
- Location of Springfield within Brown County, Minnesota
- Coordinates: 44°14′13″N 94°58′55″W
- Country: United States
- State: Minnesota
- County: Brown

Government
  - Type: Mayor – Council
  - Mayor: Lowell Helget

Area
  - Total: 1.88 sq mi (4.86 km^{2})
  - Land: 1.88 sq mi (4.86 km^{2})
  - Water: 0 sq mi (0.00 km^{2})
- Elevation: 1,053 ft (321 m)

Population (2020)
  - Total: 2,027
  - Density: 1,079.7/sq mi (416.87/km^{2})
- Time zone: UTC-6 (Central (CST))
  - Summer (DST): UTC-5 (CDT)
- ZIP code: 56087
- Area code: 507
- FIPS code: 27-61816
- GNIS feature ID: 2395941
- Website: www.springfieldmn.org

House of A.C.Ochs built of bricks from made by his company in Springfield.

Springfield is a city in Brown County, Minnesota, United States. The population was 2,027 at the 2020 census.

U.S. Highway 14 serves as a main route in the community. This location is in the middle of some of Minnesota's most productive farmland. The city was home to Minnesota's sole brick plant up until its closure in 2016.

== History ==
Jackson, Minnesota was originally platted with the name Springfield in 1856.

Springfield was originally platted in 1877 with the name of "Burns" when the Chicago and North Western Railway extended a line to the settlement. It was renamed in 1881 after either Springfield, Massachusetts. or a nearby spring.

In 1890 Adolph Casimir Ochs established the Ochs Brick and Tile Company in Springfield and Heron Lake. Ochs outlived all other brick plant in Minnesota, but it too closed in 2016. The Sanborn Company remains in Springfield.

Springfield has three Lutheran Churches as well as a Catholic and United Methodist. The town still retains active rail service from the Iowa, Chicago and Eastern Railroad a subsidiary of the Canadian Pacific.

Twelve miles south of town on County Road 2 is the Jeffers Petroglyphs State Park

== Geography ==
According to the United States Census Bureau, the city has a total area of 1.85 square miles (4.79 km^{2}), all land. The Cottonwood River flows through the city.

== Demographics ==
Historical population
Census	Pop.	Note	%±
1880	167		—
1890	716		328.7%
1900	1,511		111.0%
1910	1,482		−1.9%
1920	1,830		23.5%
1930	2,049		12.0%
1940	2,361		15.2%
1950	2,574		9.0%
1960	2,701		4.9%
1970	2,530		−6.3%
1980	2,303		−9.0%
1990	2,173		−5.6%
2000	2,215		1.9%
2010	2,152		−2.8%
2020	2,027		−5.8%
U.S. Decennial Census

=== 2020 census ===
As of the 2020 census, Springfield had a population of 2,027. The median age was 46.2 years. 22.2% of residents were under the age of 18 and 27.4% of residents were 65 years of age or older. For every 100 females there were 91.6 males, and for every 100 females age 18 and over there were 88.1 males age 18 and over.

0.0% of residents lived in urban areas, while 100.0% lived in rural areas.

There were 899 households in Springfield, of which 25.3% had children under the age of 18 living in them. Of all households, 46.7% were married-couple households, 16.6% were households with a male householder and no spouse or partner present, and 28.9% were households with a female householder and no spouse or partner present. About 35.4% of all households were made up of individuals and 21.2% had someone living alone who was 65 years of age or older.

There were 991 housing units, of which 9.3% were vacant. The homeowner vacancy rate was 1.5% and the rental vacancy rate was 14.1%.

Racial composition as of the 2020 census
Race	Number	Percent
White	1,904	93.9%
Black or African American	3	0.1%
American Indian and Alaska Native	12	0.6%
Asian	5	0.2%
Native Hawaiian and Other Pacific Islander	0	0.0%
Some other race	37	1.8%
Two or more races	66	3.3%
Hispanic or Latino (of any race)	116	5.7%

=== 2010 census ===
As of the census of 2010, there were 2,152 people, 913 households, and 558 families living in the city. The population density was 1,163.2 inhabitants per square mile (449.1/km^{2}). There were 1,015 housing units at an average density of 548.6 units per square mile (211.8 units/km^{2}). The racial makeup of the city was 95% White, 0.8% African American, 0.2% Native American, 0.4% Asian, 0.6% from other races, and 0.8% from two or more races. Hispanic or Latino of any race were 4.6% of the population.

There were 913 households, of which 27.1% had children under the age of 18 living with them, 50.9% were married couples living together, 6.8% had a female householder with no husband present, 3.4% had a male householder with no wife present, and 38.9% were non-families. 34.6% of all households were made up of individuals, and 20.7% had someone living alone who was 65 years of age or older. The average household size was 2.24 and the average family size was 2.88.

The median age in the city was 46.8 years. 22.5% of residents were under the age of 18; 6% were between the ages of 18 and 24; 19.4% were from 25 to 44; 25.7% were from 45 to 64; and 26.3% were 65 years of age or older. The gender makeup of the city was 47.6% male and 52.4% female.

=== 2000 census ===
As of the census of 2000, there were 2,215 people, 897 households, and 562 families living in the city. The population density was 1,223.9 inhabitants per square mile (472.6/km^{2}). There were 968 housing units at an average density of 534.9 units per square mile (206.5 units/km^{2}). The racial makeup of the city was 98.33% White, 0.32% Native American, 0.45% Asian, 0.63% from other races, and 0.27% from two or more races. Hispanic or Latino of any race were 1.99% of the population.

There were 897 households, out of which 30.2% had children under the age of 18 living with them, 53.7% were married couples living together, 5.2% had a female householder with no husband present, and 37.3% were non-families. 34.6% of all households were made up of individuals, and 22.4% had someone living alone who was 65 years of age or older. The average household size was 2.33 and the average family size was 3.03.

In the city, the population was spread out, with 26.0% under the age of 18, 5.7% from 18 to 24, 22.4% from 25 to 44, 18.6% from 45 to 64, and 27.3% who were 65 years of age or older. The median age was 42 years. For every 100 females, there were 86.9 males. For every 100 females age 18 and over, there were 83.2 males.

The median income for a household in the city was $34,643, and the median income for a family was $41,071. Males had a median income of $30,000 versus $21,779 for females. The per capita income for the city was $16,977. About 2.5% of families and 6.5% of the population were below the poverty line, including 3.6% of those under age 18 and 12.4% of those age 65 or over.

== Notable people ==
- Bernie Bierman, one of the most successful coaches in Minnesota Golden Gophers football history, was born in Springfield.
- Marty Seifert, who served the Minnesota House of Representatives as House Minority Leader from 2006 through 2009, was born in Springfield.
- Glen Taylor, prominent Minnesota businessman and owner of the Minnesota Timberwolves was born in Springfield.
