= Cottonwood River (Minnesota) =

River in Minnesota, United States

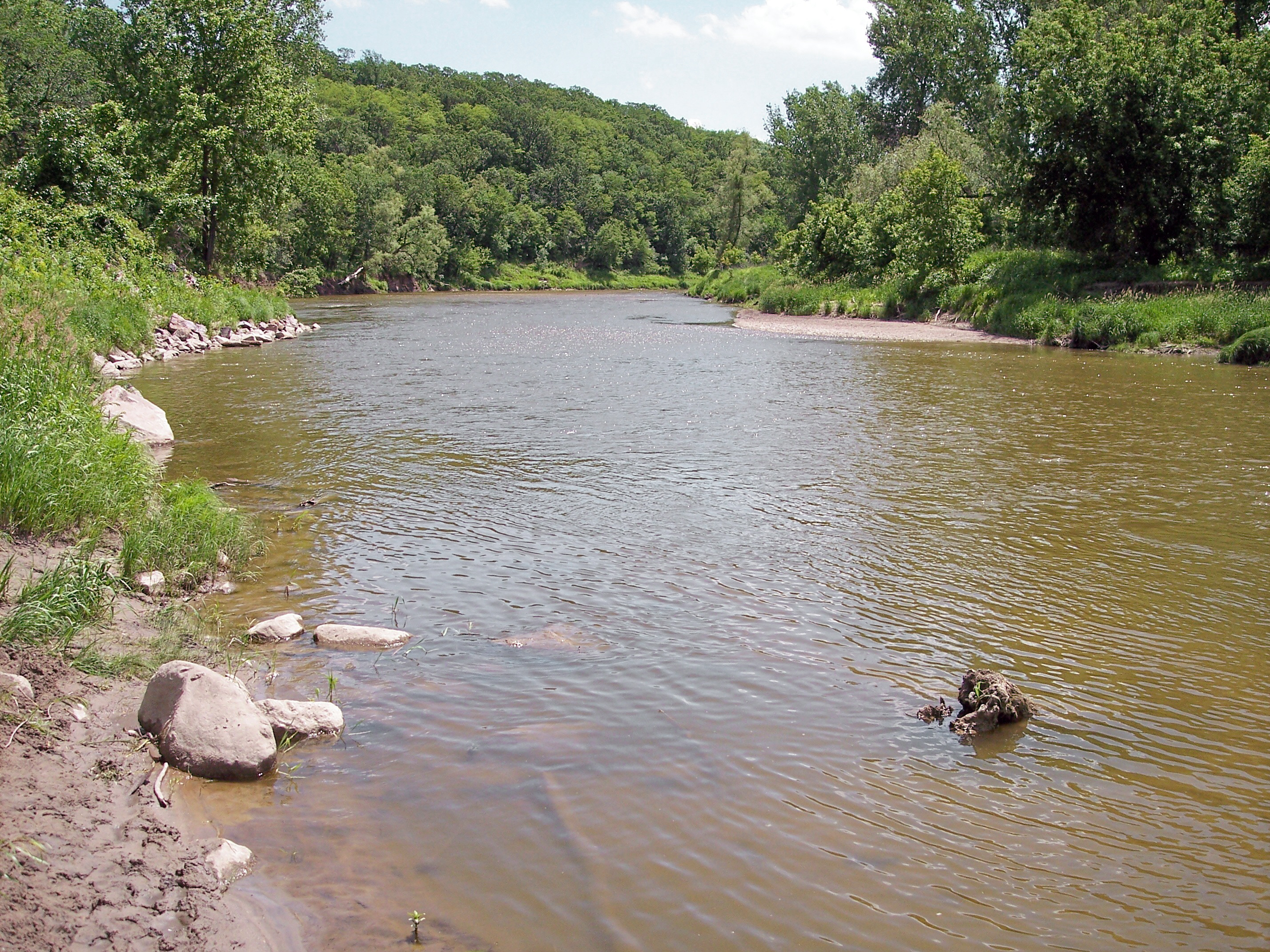
- The Cottonwood River in Flandrau State Park in 2007

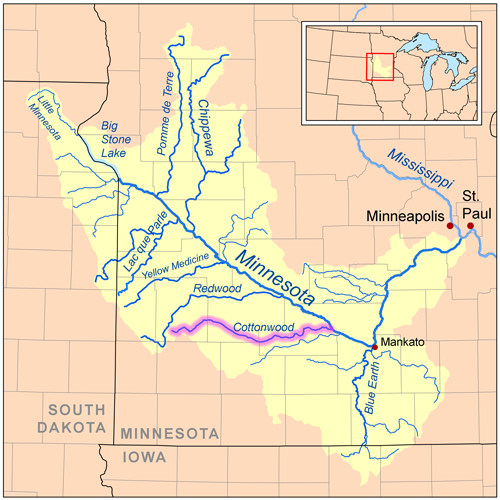

Location
- Country: United States
- State: Minnesota

Physical characteristics
- Source: Coteau des Prairies
  - location: Rock Lake Township, Lyon County
  - coordinates: 44°12′06″N 95°56′06″W
  - elevation: 1,653 ft (504 m)
- Mouth: Minnesota River
  - location: near New Ulm, Brown County
  - coordinates: 44°17′05″N 94°24′55″W
  - elevation: 794 ft (242 m)
- Length: 152.4 mi (245.3 km)
- Basin size: 1,313 mi^{2} (3,400 km^{2})
- Discharge
  - location: near New Ulm
  - average: 381 cu ft/s (10.8 m^{3}/s)
  - minimum: 0.5 cu ft/s (0.014 m^{3}/s)
  - maximum: 28,700 cu ft/s (810 m^{3}/s)

The Cottonwood River (Dakota: Wáǧa Ožú Wakpá, lit. 'Cottonwood Grove River') is a tributary of the Minnesota River, 152 miles (245 km) long, in southwestern Minnesota in the United States. Via the Minnesota River, it is part of the watershed of the Mississippi River, draining an area of 1,313 square miles (3,400 km^{2}) in an agricultural region. The river's name is a translation of the Dakota name for the river, Wáǧa Ožú Wakpá, for the cottonwood tree groves, which are common along prairie rivers. It has also been known historically as the Big Cottonwood River.

The Cottonwood River flows generally eastwardly throughout its course. It rises southwest of Balaton in Rock Lake Township in southern Lyon County, as an intermittent stream on the Coteau des Prairies, a morainic plateau dividing the Mississippi and Missouri River watersheds. The river flows off the Coteau in a wooded valley in southeastern Lyon County, dropping 200 feet (61 m) in five miles (8.0 km), and enters a region of till plains, flowing through southern Redwood County, the northeastern corner of Cottonwood County, and northern Brown County, past the communities of Sanborn and Springfield. It enters a wooded valley near its mouth, flowing through Flandrau State Park and entering the Minnesota River just southeast of New Ulm. The river was formerly dammed to form a lake in the state park, but the dam was not rebuilt after being washed out by floods in 1965 and 1969.

Due to the northeastward slope of the Coteau des Prairies and the presence of a terminal moraine along the northern side of the river, very few tributaries enter the Cottonwood River from the north. The largest is Sleepy Eye Creek, 51 miles (82 km) long, which flows eastwardly through Redwood and Brown Counties, past Cobden. Tributaries from the south include Plum Creek, 35 miles (56 km) long, which flows northeastwardly through Murray and Redwood Counties, past Walnut Grove; and Dutch Charley Creek, 46 miles (74 km) long, which flows northeastwardly through Murray, Cottonwood, and Redwood Counties.

Approximately 84% of land in the Cottonwood River watershed is used for agriculture; the predominant crops are corn and soybeans. Wetlands in the watershed have been extensively drained, and fewer than 4,000 acres (16 km^{2}) remain.

== Flow rate ==
At the United States Geological Survey's stream gauge near New Ulm, 3.2 miles (5.1 km) upstream from the river's mouth, the annual mean flow of the river between 1909 and 2005 was 381 cubic feet per second (10.8 m^{3}/s). The highest recorded flow during the period was 28,700 cu ft/s (810 m^{3}/s) on April 10, 1969. The lowest recorded flow was 0.5 cu ft/s (0.014 m^{3}/s) on November 27, 1952.

== See also ==
- List of rivers of Minnesota
- List of longest streams of Minnesota
- Little Cottonwood River
- List of Minnesota placenames of Native American origin
