= Brown County, Minnesota =

County in Minnesota, United States

- County
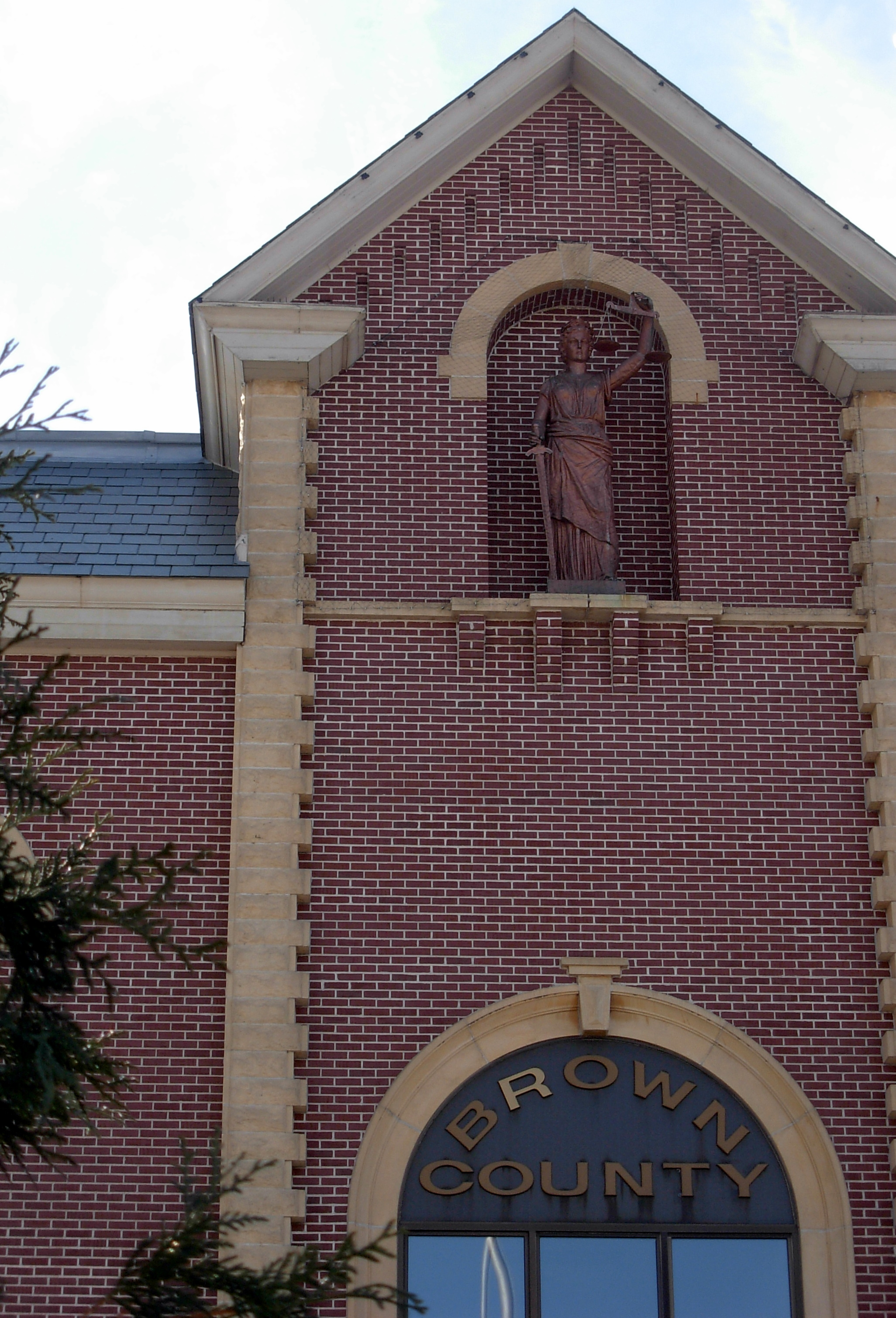
- Brown County Courthouse

- Location within the U.S. state of Minnesota
- Coordinates: 44°14′N 94°43′W
- Country: United States
- State: Minnesota
- Created: February 20, 1855
- Organized: 1856
- Named for: Joseph Renshaw Brown
- Seat: New Ulm
- Largest city: New Ulm

Area
  - Total: 618 sq mi (1,600 km^{2})
  - Land: 611 sq mi (1,580 km^{2})
  - Water: 7.4 sq mi (19 km^{2}) 1.2%

Population (2020)
  - Total: 25,912
  - Estimate (2025): 25,517 ▼
  - Density: 41.9/sq mi (16.2/km^{2})
- Time zone: UTC−6 (Central)
  - Summer (DST): UTC−5 (CDT)
- Congressional districts: 1st, 7th
- Website: www.browncountymn.gov

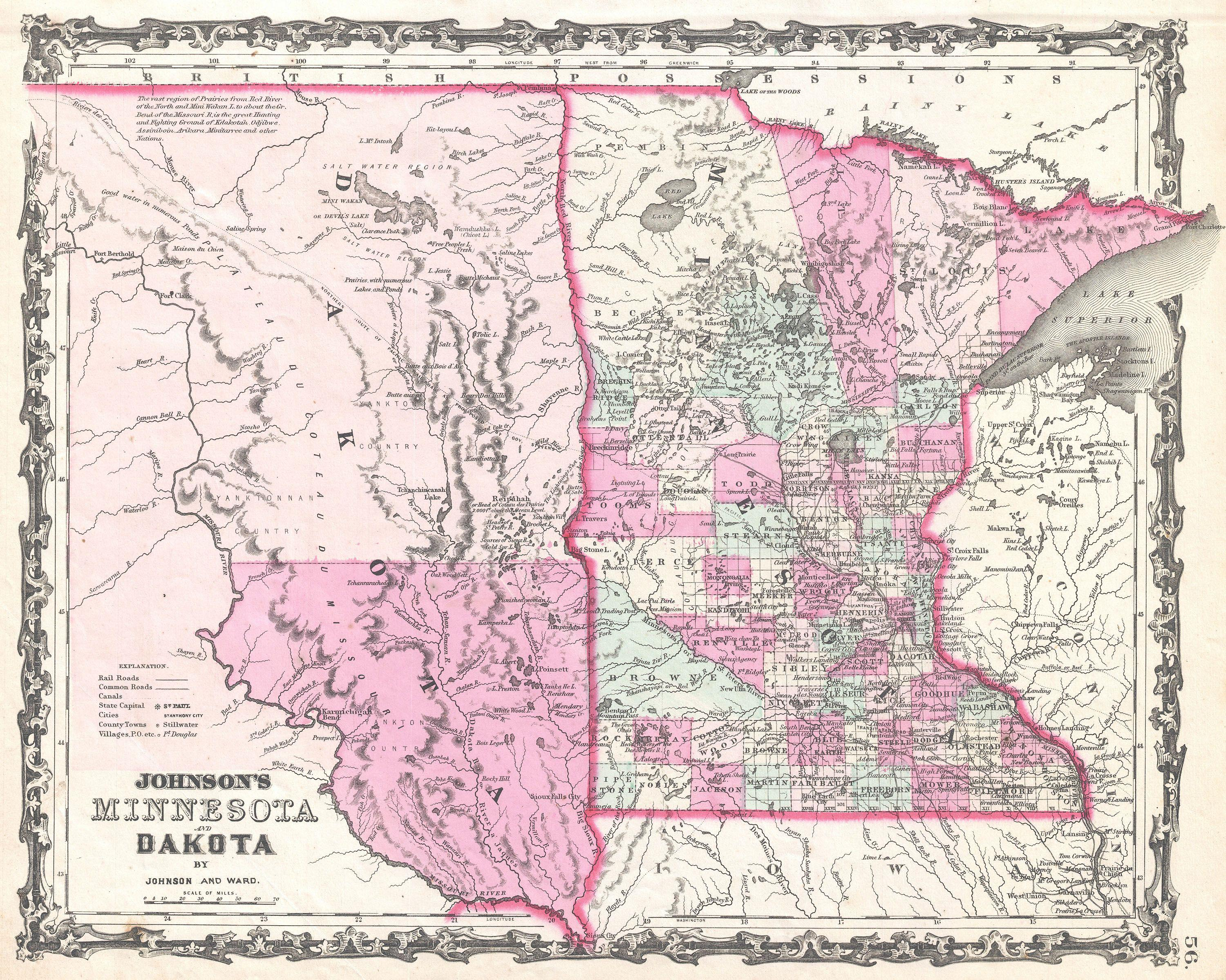
1862 Johnson Map showing Brown County was much bigger at the time of the Sioux Uprising and would be later broken up into several other counties

Brown County is a county in the U.S. state of Minnesota. As of the 2020 census, the population was 25,912. Its county seat is New Ulm. The county was formed in 1855 and organized in 1856.

Brown County comprises the New Ulm, MN Micropolitan Statistical Area and is included in the Mankato–New Ulm, MN Combined Statistical Area.

== History ==
Brown County was founded in 1855 in the southwest corner of what was Minnesota Territory. It was named for Joseph Renshaw Brown, a member of the Governor's Council of the Territory in 1855. In 1857, Brown County was divided, creating Cottonwood, Jackson, Martin, Murry, Nobles, Pipestone, and Rock counties. Watonwan was broken off in 1860. Redwood was created from a large portion of Brown County in 1862. Redwood was further divided into Lac qui Parle, Lincoln, Lyon and Yellow Medicine Counties in the 1870s.

In 1862, the county's 150-mile northern border was the boundary line of the Upper and Lower Sioux reservations when the 1862 Dakota War broke out. New Ulm, the county seat, came under heavy attack twice by a superior Mdewakanton Dacotah force that was repulsed. Most of the town was torched and most of the population fled to St. Peter and Mankato. The town took many casualties, with the dead buried in the streets. In 1863, when the treaties with the eastern Dacotah were annulled and the two reservations were dissolved, the county border was moved north 10 miles to the Minnesota River.

== Geography ==
The Minnesota River flows east-southeast along the county's northern border. The Cottonwood River flows east-northeast through the county's central and upper area, discharging into the Minnesota at the northern border. The Little Cottonwood River flows east through the lower portion of the county, on its way to discharge into the Minnesota in neighboring Blue Earth County. The terrain consists of rolling hills, mostly devoted to agriculture, and generally slopes to the east, tending to drop into the river valleys. Its highest point is at its southwestern corner, at 1,263 ft (385 m) ASL.

The county has an area of 618 square miles (1,600 km^{2}), of which 611 square miles (1,580 km^{2}) is land and 7.4 square miles (19 km^{2}) (1.2%) is water.

Soils of Brown County

=== Transit ===
- Hermann Express

=== Major highways ===
- U.S. Highway 14
- Minnesota State Highway 4
- Minnesota State Highway 15
- Minnesota State Highway 68
- Minnesota State Highway 257

=== Adjacent counties ===
- Nicollet County - northeast
- Blue Earth County - southeast
- Watonwan County - south
- Cottonwood County - southwest
- Redwood County - west
- Renville County - northwest

=== Lakes ===
Most of the county is an area of rich farm land; most of its wetlands were drained for use in agriculture, leaving a number of lakes. The county has at least 32 lakes, some of which are deemed to be "protected waters" of the State of Minnesota; these are designated with "(p)" below.

The lakes occupy "hollows in the driftsheet"; many have neither an inflow nor an outflow.

Lakes in the county include:

- Altermatt Lake (p)
- Bachelor Lake (p), in Stark township
- Boise Lake (p)
- Clear Lake (p)
- Gilman Lake (p)
- Horseshoe Lake
- Juni Lake (p), named for Benedict Juni, a Swiss settler.
- Lake Cottonwood (p)
- Lake Hanska (p)
- Linden Lake (p)
- Lone Tree Lake (p)
- Omsrud Lake (p)
- School Lake (p), named for its location in school section 16.
- Sleepy Eye Lake (p)
- Zanders Lake (p)

== Climate and weather ==
In recent years, average temperatures in the county seat of New Ulm have ranged from a low of 6 °F (−14 °C) in January to a high of 83 °F (28 °C) in July, although a record low of −37 °F (−38 °C) was recorded in January 1984 and a record high of 105 °F (41 °C) was recorded in July 1988. Average monthly precipitation ranged from 0.64 inches (16 mm) in January to 4.82 inches (122 mm) in June.

== Demographics ==
Historical population
Census	Pop.	Note	%±
1860	2,339		—
1870	6,396		173.5%
1880	12,018		87.9%
1890	15,817		31.6%
1900	19,787		25.1%
1910	20,134		1.8%
1920	22,421		11.4%
1930	23,428		4.5%
1940	25,544		9.0%
1950	25,895		1.4%
1960	27,676		6.9%
1970	28,887		4.4%
1980	28,645		−0.8%
1990	26,984		−5.8%
2000	26,911		−0.3%
2010	25,893		−3.8%
2020	25,912		0.1%
2025 (est.)	25,517	▼	−1.5%
U.S. Decennial Census; 1790-1960 1900-1990; 1990-2000 2010-2020

=== Racial and ethnic composition ===
Brown County, Minnesota – Racial and ethnic composition Note: the US Census treats Hispanic/Latino as an ethnic category. This table excludes Latinos from the racial categories and assigns them to a separate category. Hispanics/Latinos may be of any race.
Race / Ethnicity (NH = Non-Hispanic)	Pop 1980	Pop 1990	Pop 2000	Pop 2010	Pop 2020	% 1980	% 1990	% 2000	% 2010	% 2020
White alone (NH)	28,447	26,711	26,080	24,662	23,968	99.31%	98.99%	96.91%	95.25%	92.50%
Black or African American alone (NH)	3	11	20	56	118	0.01%	0.04%	0.07%	0.22%	0.46%
Native American or Alaska Native alone (NH)	27	12	26	19	39	0.09%	0.04%	0.10%	0.07%	0.15%
Asian alone (NH)	92	98	109	152	126	0.32%	0.36%	0.41%	0.59%	0.49%
Native Hawaiian or Pacific Islander alone (NH)	x	x	2	2	6	x	x	0.01%	0.01%	0.02%
Other race alone (NH)	3	1	7	0	20	0.01%	0.00%	0.03%	0.00%	0.08%
Mixed race or Multiracial (NH)	x	x	122	142	464	x	x	0.45%	0.55%	1.79%
Hispanic or Latino (any race)	73	151	545	860	1,171	0.25%	0.56%	2.03%	3.32%	4.52%
Total	28,645	26,984	26,911	25,893	25,912	100.00%	100.00%	100.00%	100.00%	100.00%

=== 2020 census ===
As of the 2020 census, the county had a population of 25,912. The median age was 43.1 years. 21.6% of residents were under the age of 18 and 22.4% of residents were 65 years of age or older. For every 100 females there were 99.5 males, and for every 100 females age 18 and over there were 96.5 males age 18 and over.

The racial makeup of the county was 93.9% White, 0.5% Black or African American, 0.2% American Indian and Alaska Native, 0.5% Asian, <0.1% Native Hawaiian and Pacific Islander, 1.5% from some other race, and 3.4% from two or more races. Hispanic or Latino residents of any race comprised 4.5% of the population.

51.8% of residents lived in urban areas, while 48.2% lived in rural areas.

There were 10,970 households in the county, of which 25.6% had children under the age of 18 living in them. Of all households, 50.0% were married-couple households, 19.3% were households with a male householder and no spouse or partner present, and 24.5% were households with a female householder and no spouse or partner present. About 32.9% of all households were made up of individuals and 15.8% had someone living alone who was 65 years of age or older.

There were 11,780 housing units, of which 6.9% were vacant. Among occupied housing units, 77.5% were owner-occupied and 22.5% were renter-occupied. The homeowner vacancy rate was 1.5% and the rental vacancy rate was 9.5%.

=== 2000 census ===
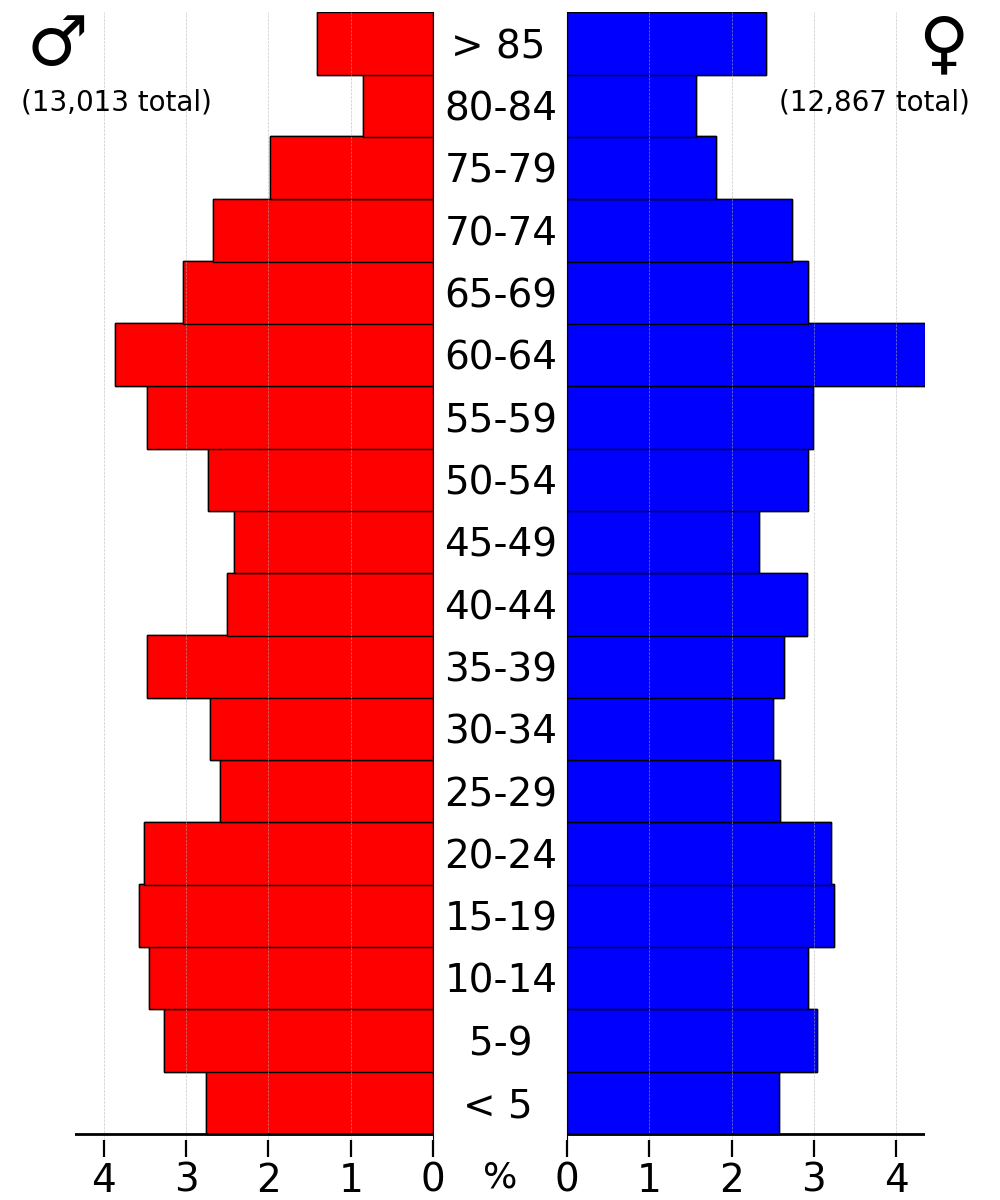
2022 US Census population pyramid for Brown County, from ACS 5-year estimates

As of the 2000 census, there were 26,911 people, 10,598 households, and 7,164 families in the county. The population density was 44.0 per square mile (17.0/km^{2}). There were 11,163 housing units at an average density of 18.3 per square mile (7.1/km^{2}). The racial makeup of the county was 97.82% White, 0.10% Black or African American, 0.12% Native American, 0.41% Asian, 0.01% Pacific Islander, 0.91% from other races, and 0.63% from two or more races. 2.03% of the population were Hispanic or Latino of any race. 67.1% were of German and 9.6% Norwegian ancestry.

There were 10,598 households, out of which 31.50% had children under the age of 18 living with them, 57.30% were married couples living together, 6.90% had a female householder with no husband present, and 32.40% were non-families. 29.00% of all households were made up of individuals, and 14.30% had someone living alone who was 65 years of age or older. The average household size was 2.43 and the average family size was 3.00.

The county population contained 25.30% under the age of 18, 9.70% from 18 to 24, 25.60% from 25 to 44, 21.90% from 45 to 64, and 17.50% who were 65 years of age or older. The median age was 38 years. For every 100 females there were 98.20 males. For every 100 females age 18 and over, there were 95.90 males.

The median income for a household in the county was $39,800, and the median income for a family was $49,811. Males had a median income of $32,347 versus $23,918 for females. The per capita income for the county was $19,535. About 4.40% of families and 6.40% of the population were below the poverty line, including 7.00% of those under age 18 and 9.80% of those age 65 or over.

== Communities ==
=== Cities ===
- Cobden
- Comfrey (partial)
- Evan
- Hanska
- New Ulm (county seat)
- Sleepy Eye
- Springfield

=== Census-designated place ===
- Essig
- Searles

=== Unincorporated communities ===
- Godahl (partial)
- Leavenworth

=== Townships ===
- Albin Township
- Bashaw Township
- Burnstown Township
- Cottonwood Township
- Eden Township
- Home Township
- Lake Hanska Township
- Leavenworth Township
- Linden Township
- Milford Township
- Mulligan Township
- North Star Township
- Prairieville Township
- Sigel Township
- Stark Township
- Stately Township

== Government and politics ==
Brown County has traditionally voted Republican. As of 2024, the only time the county has supported the Democratic nominee for president since 1936 was in the 1964 landslide win for Lyndon B. Johnson, and even then, Johnson only won the county by 218 votes and less than a 2% margin of victory.

United States presidential election results for Brown County, Minnesota
Year	Republican		Democratic		Third party(ies)	
Year	No.	%	No.	%	No.	%
1892	1,080	38.48%	1,174	41.82%	553	19.70%
1896	1,807	53.41%	1,469	43.42%	107	3.16%
1900	1,695	52.06%	1,471	45.18%	90	2.76%
1904	2,073	68.39%	869	28.67%	89	2.94%
1908	1,518	45.22%	1,536	45.76%	303	9.03%
1912	472	14.93%	1,359	42.99%	1,330	42.08%
1916	2,078	59.68%	1,101	31.62%	303	8.70%
1920	5,841	80.68%	796	10.99%	603	8.33%
1924	2,255	31.87%	270	3.82%	4,551	64.32%
1928	3,611	40.05%	5,341	59.24%	64	0.71%
1932	2,027	22.64%	6,716	75.00%	212	2.37%
1936	2,679	26.09%	6,637	64.64%	951	9.26%
1940	7,533	66.66%	3,678	32.55%	90	0.80%
1944	7,018	70.54%	2,842	28.57%	89	0.89%
1948	5,068	50.60%	4,804	47.96%	144	1.44%
1952	8,152	72.09%	3,129	27.67%	27	0.24%
1956	7,965	72.02%	3,067	27.73%	27	0.24%
1960	7,084	56.89%	5,353	42.99%	16	0.13%
1964	5,851	49.02%	6,069	50.84%	17	0.14%
1968	7,039	57.00%	4,585	37.13%	726	5.88%
1972	7,791	61.21%	4,347	34.15%	591	4.64%
1976	7,479	53.27%	5,792	41.26%	768	5.47%
1980	8,051	57.01%	4,915	34.80%	1,156	8.19%
1984	8,399	64.72%	4,469	34.44%	109	0.84%
1988	6,898	56.67%	5,109	41.97%	166	1.36%
1992	5,390	39.57%	4,278	31.41%	3,953	29.02%
1996	5,580	45.15%	4,864	39.36%	1,915	15.49%
2000	7,370	57.43%	4,650	36.23%	814	6.34%
2004	8,395	60.93%	5,158	37.44%	225	1.63%
2008	7,456	54.74%	5,809	42.65%	355	2.61%
2012	7,938	56.99%	5,630	40.42%	361	2.59%
2016	8,708	63.20%	3,763	27.31%	1,308	9.49%
2020	9,552	65.27%	4,753	32.48%	330	2.25%
2024	9,692	66.39%	4,576	31.35%	330	2.26%

== See also ==
- National Register of Historic Places listings in Brown County, Minnesota

== Footnotes ==
=== Works cited ===
- Winchell, N. H.; Upham, Warren (1884). "The geology of Pipestone and Rock Counties". Geology of Minnesota: Final Report. Vol. 1. Pioneer Press Company, Printers.
