= 2022 United States House of Representatives elections in Minnesota =

- November 8, 2022

All 8 Minnesota seats to the United States House of Representatives
	Majority party	Minority party
Party	Democratic (DFL)	Republican
Last election	4	4
Seats won	4	4
Seat change	Steady	Steady
Popular vote	1,250,518	1,200,855
Percentage	50.10%	48.11%
Swing	▲1.43%	▲1.93%

Democratic–Farmer–Labor
40–50%
50–60%
60–70%
70–80%
Republican
40–50%
50–60%
60–70%
70–80%

The 2022 United States House of Representatives elections in Minnesota were held on November 8, 2022, to elect the eight U.S. representatives from the state of Minnesota, one from each of the state's eight congressional districts. The elections coincided with other elections to the House of Representatives, elections to the United States Senate, and various state and local elections.

== Overview ==
=== Statewide ===
Party	Candidates	Votes		Seats		
Party	Candidates	No.	%	No.	+/–	%
Democratic-Farmer-Labor	8	1,250,518	50.10	4	Steady	50.00
Republican	8	1,200,855	48.11	4	Steady	50.00
Legal Marijuana Now	3	33,538	1.34	0	Steady	0.0
Write-in	8	5,978	0.24	0	Steady	0.0
Grassroots—LC	1	4,943	0.20	0	Steady	0.0
Total		2,495,832	100.0	8	Steady	100.0

Popular vote
Democratic	50.10%
Republican	48.11%
Legal Marijuana	1.34%
Other	0.44%

House seats
Democratic	50.00%
Republican	50.00%

=== By district ===
Results of the 2022 United States House of Representatives elections in Minnesota by district:

District	Democratic		Republican		Others		Total		Result
District	Votes	%	Votes	%	Votes	%	Votes	%	Result
District 1	125,457	42.31%	159,621	53.83%	11,469	3.87%	296,547	100.0%	Republican hold
District 2	165,583	50.87%	148,576	45.65%	11,313	3.48%	325,472	100.0%	Democratic hold
District 3	198,883	59.56%	134,797	40.37%	241	0.07%	333,921	100.0%	Democratic hold
District 4	200,055	67.59%	95,493	32.26%	425	0.14%	295,973	100.0%	Democratic hold
District 5	214,224	74.33%	70,702	24.53%	3,280	1.14%	288,206	100.0%	Democratic hold
District 6	120,852	37.79%	198,145	61.97%	770	0.24%	319,767	100.0%	Republican hold
District 7	84,455	27.61%	204,766	66.95%	16,645	5.44%	305,866	100.0%	Republican hold
District 8	141,009	42.72%	188,755	57.18%	316	0.10%	330,080	100.0%	Republican hold
Total	1,250,518	50.10%	1,200,855	48.11%	44,459	1.78%	2,495,832	100.0%	

== District 1 ==
2022 Minnesota's 1st congressional district election
- November 8, 2022
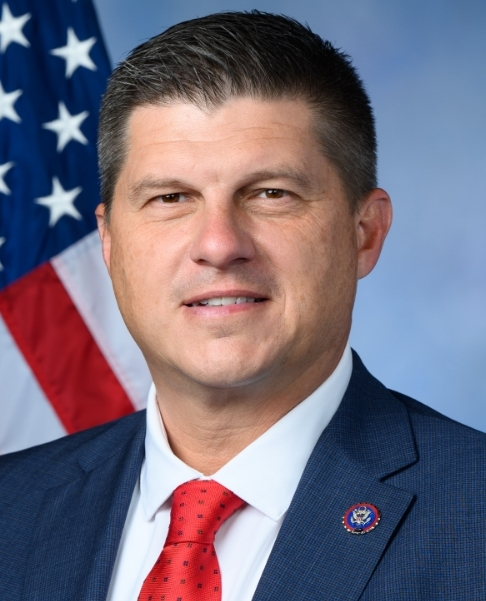

Nominee	Brad Finstad	Jeff Ettinger
Party	Republican	Democratic (DFL)
Popular vote	159,621	125,457
Percentage	53.8%	42.3%
- Finstad: 40–50% 50–60% 60–70% 70–80% 80–90% ≥90% Ettinger: 40–50% 50–60% 60–70% 70–80% 80–90% ≥90% Tie: 40–50% No votes
U.S. Representative before election
Brad Finstad
Republican
Elected U.S. Representative
Brad Finstad
Republican

The 1st district stretches across southern Minnesota from its borders with South Dakota to Wisconsin, and includes the cities of Rochester, Mankato, Winona, Austin, Owatonna, Albert Lea, New Ulm, and Worthington. The incumbent was Republican Jim Hagedorn, who was reelected with 48.6% of the vote in 2020. The seat is currently held by Brad Finstad, who won the special election held on August 9 after Hagedorn died on February 17, 2022.

=== Republican primary ===
==== Nominee ====
- Brad Finstad, incumbent U.S. representative, former Minnesota director of USDA Rural Development, and former state representative

==== Eliminated in primary ====
- Jeremy Munson, state representative

==== Withdrawn ====
- Matt Benda, agricultural law attorney
- John Berman, electronic hardware design, test engineer and candidate for U.S. Senate (Minnesota and Kansas) in 2020
- Ken Navitsky, sales executive, former Rochester Planning & Zoning commissioner, and former Minnesota State University placekicker (running for state senate)

==== Declined ====
- Jason Baskin, Austin city councillor
- Carla Nelson, state senator (running for re-election)
- Julie Rosen, state senator

===== Endorsements =====
Jeremy Munson

U.S. representatives

- Scott Perry, U.S. Representative for Pennsylvania's 10th congressional district (2013–present)
Brad Finstad

Newspapers and publications

- Rochester Post-Bulletin

Organizations

- Tea Party Express

=== Results ===
Republican primary results
Party	Candidate	Votes	%
Republican	Brad Finstad	48,252	76.0
Republican	Jeremy Munson	15,207	24.0
Total votes		63,459	100.0

=== Candidates ===
==== Nominee ====
- Jeff Ettinger, corporate executive and former CEO of Hormel Foods

==== Eliminated in primary ====
- George H. Kalberer, CEO and president of Kalberer Financial Management and candidate for U.S. Senate of Washington in 2018
- James Rainwater, attorney-mediator and candidate for Minnesota's 1st congressional district in 2022 special election

==== Declined ====
- Dan Feehan, U.S. Army veteran, former U.S. Department of Defense official, nominee for Minnesota's 1st congressional district in 2018 and 2020

==== Results ====
Democratic–Farmer–Labor primary results
Party	Candidate	Votes	%
Democratic (DFL)	Jeff Ettinger	51,391	92.1
Democratic (DFL)	James Rainwater	3,115	5.6
Democratic (DFL)	George Kalberer	1,266	2.3
Total votes		55,772	100.0

=== Independent and third-party candidates ===
==== Legal Marijuana Now ====
===== Nominee =====
- Richard B. Reisdorf, peace activist

Legal Marijuana Now primary results
Party	Candidate	Votes	%
Legal Marijuana Now	Richard Reisdorf	565	100.0
Total votes		565	100.0

==== Grassroots–Legalize Cannabis ====
===== Nominee =====
- Brian Abrahamson

Grassroots–Legalize Cannabis primary results
Party	Candidate	Votes	%
Grassroots—LC	Brian Abrahamson	361	100.0
Total votes		361	100.0

==== Independent ====
===== Withdrew =====
- Brandon Millholland-Corcoran

=== General election ===
==== Debate ====
2022 Minnesota's 1st congressional district debate
No.	Date	Host	Moderator	Link	Republican	Democratic–Farmer–Labor
Key: P Participant A Absent N Not invited I Invited W Withdrawn						
Key: P Participant A Absent N Not invited I Invited W Withdrawn					Brad Finstad	Jeff Ettinger
1	Oct. 13, 2022	Greater Mankato Growth	Lisa Cownie; Andy Wilke		P	P

==== Predictions ====
Source	Ranking	As of
The Cook Political Report	Likely R	July 19, 2022
Inside Elections	Solid R	April 7, 2022
Sabato's Crystal Ball	Likely R	August 10, 2022
Politico	Likely R	April 5, 2022
RCP	Likely R	August 9, 2022
Fox News	Solid R	July 11, 2022
DDHQ	Solid R	July 20, 2022
538	Solid R	June 30, 2022
The Economist	Likely R	November 1, 2022

==== Polling ====
Poll source	Date(s) administered	Sample size (Note: Key: A – all adults RV – registered voters LV – likely voters V – unclear)	Margin of error	Brad Finstad (R)	Jeff Ettinger (DFL)	Richard Reisdorf (LMN)	Undecided
SurveyUSA	October 20–23, 2022	563 (LV)	± 3.0%	46%	37%	6%	10%

==== Results ====
2022 Minnesota's 1st congressional district election
Party	Candidate	Votes	%
Republican	Brad Finstad (incumbent)	159,621	53.8
Democratic (DFL)	Jeff Ettinger	125,457	42.3
Legal Marijuana Now	Richard B. Reisdorf	6,389	2.1
Grassroots—LC	Brian Abrahamson	4,943	1.7
Write-in		137	0.1
Total votes		296,547	100.0
Republican hold			

== District 2 ==
2022 Minnesota's 2nd congressional district election
- November 8, 2022
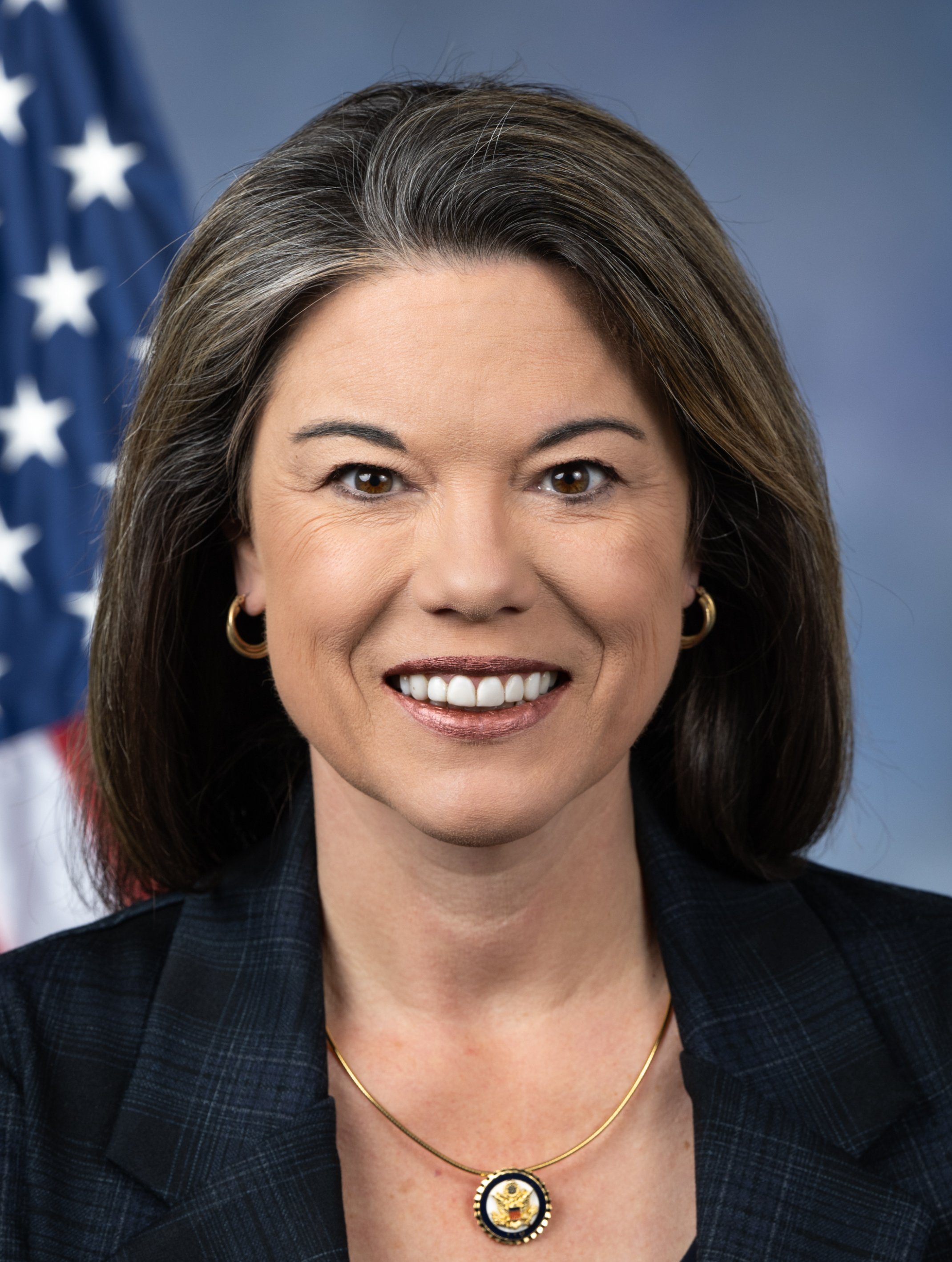

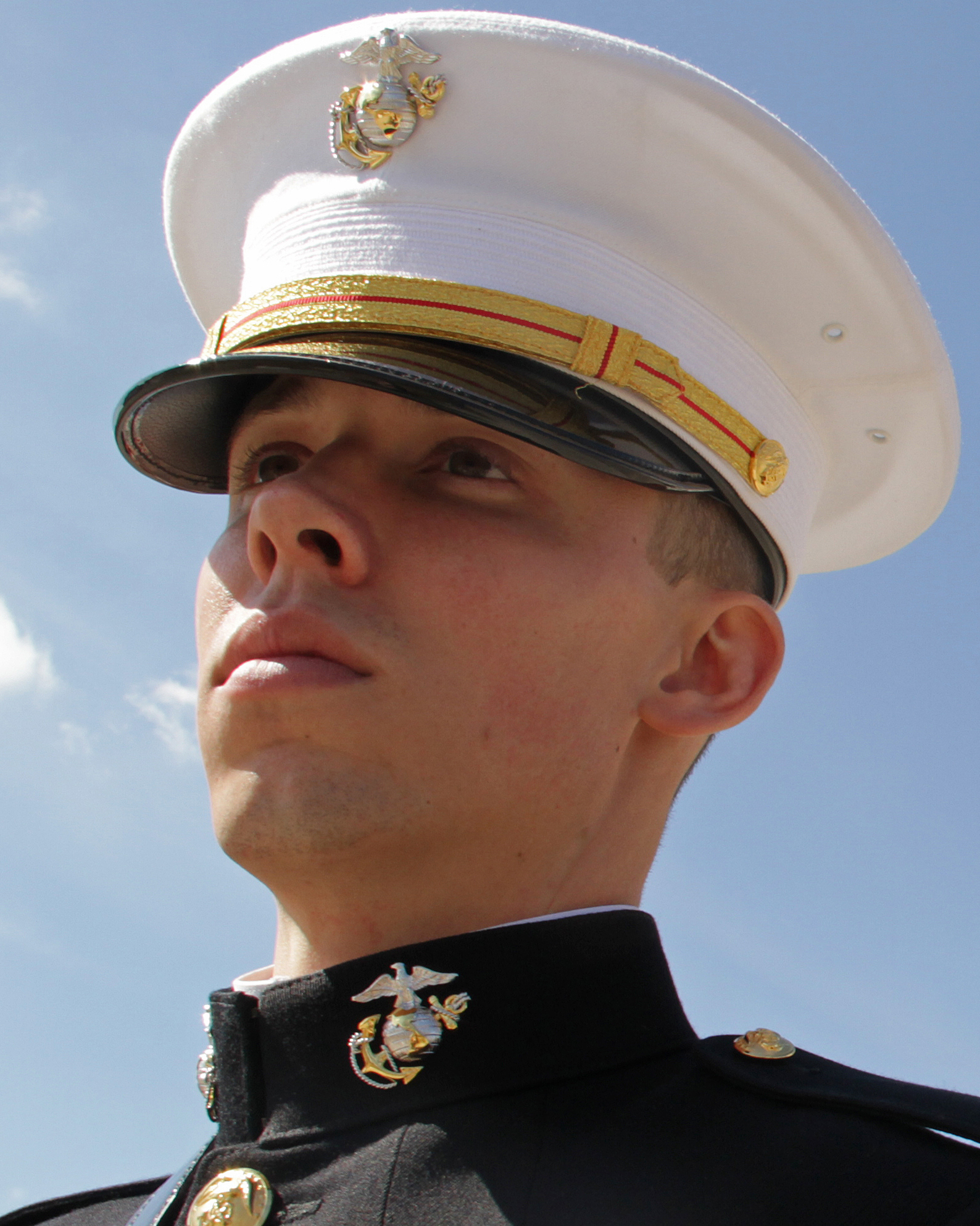
Nominee	Angie Craig	Tyler Kistner
Party	Democratic (DFL)	Republican
Popular vote	165,583	148,576
Percentage	50.9%	45.6%
- Craig: 40–50% 50–60% 60–70% 70–80% 80–90% ≥90% Kistner: 40–50% 50–60% 60–70% 70–80% 80–90% ≥90% Tie: 40–50% No votes
U.S. Representative before election
Angie Craig
Democratic (DFL)
Elected U.S. Representative
Angie Craig
Democratic (DFL)

The 2nd district is based in the south Twin Cities area. The incumbent was Democrat Angie Craig, who was reelected with 48.2% of the vote in 2020.

=== Democratic primary ===
==== Candidates ====
===== Nominee =====
- Angie Craig, incumbent U.S. representative

==== Endorsements ====
Angie Craig

Organizations

- American Israel Public Affairs Committee
- Council for a Livable World
- Democratic Majority for Israel
- EMILY's List
- End Citizens United
- Equality PAC
- Feminist Majority PAC
- Giffords
- Jewish Democratic Council of America
- League of Conservation Voters
- Let America Vote
- LPAC
- NARAL Pro-Choice America
- National Women's Political Caucus
- Planned Parenthood Action Fund
- Sierra Club

Labor unions

- National Education Association
- United Auto Workers

=== Republican primary ===
==== Candidates ====
===== Nominee =====
- Tyler Kistner, former Marine and nominee for this district in 2020

==== Endorsements ====
Tyler Kistner

Organizations

- Tea Party Express
- Turning Point Action

=== Independent and third-party candidates ===
==== Legal Marijuana Now ====
===== Nominee =====
- Paula Overby, perennial candidate (died in October 2022, remained on ballot)

==== Independents ====
===== Did not qualify =====
- Rick Olson, former Michigan state representative and Republican candidate for this district in 2020

=== General election ===
==== Debate ====
2022 Minnesota's 2nd congressional district debate
No.	Date	Host	Moderator	Link	Democratic–Farmer–Labor	Republican
Key: P Participant A Absent N Not invited I Invited W Withdrawn						
Key: P Participant A Absent N Not invited I Invited W Withdrawn					Angie Craig	Tyler Kistner
1	Oct. 13, 2022	Dakota County; Regional Chamber	Maureen Scallen Failor		P	P

==== Predictions ====
Source	Ranking	As of
The Cook Political Report	Tossup	February 16, 2022
Inside Elections	Tossup	August 25, 2022
Sabato's Crystal Ball	Lean D	November 7, 2022
Politico	Tossup	April 5, 2022
RCP	Lean R (flip)	October 21, 2022
Fox News	Tossup	July 11, 2022
DDHQ	Lean D	July 20, 2022
538	Likely D	November 8, 2022
The Economist	Lean D	November 1, 2022

==== Polling ====
Poll source	Date(s) administered	Sample size	Margin of error	Angie Craig (DFL)	Tyler Kistner (R)	Paula Overby (LMN)	Other	Undecided
SurveyUSA	October 13–16, 2022	586 (LV)	± 4.6%	46%	45%	5%	–	4%
RMG Research	July 19–26, 2022	400 (LV)	± 4.9%	47%	46%	–	0%	6%
Cygnal (R) (Note: This poll was sponsored by Kistner's campaign.)	May 14–15, 2022	450 (LV)	± 4.6%	43%	38%	4%	–	15%

Hypothetical polling

Generic Democrat vs. generic Republican

Poll source	Date(s) administered	Sample size	Margin of error	Generic Democrat	Generic Republican	Undecided
Cygnal (R)	May 14–15, 2022	450 (LV)	± 4.6%	44%	46%	10%

==== Results ====
2022 Minnesota's 2nd congressional district election
Party	Candidate	Votes	%
Democratic (DFL)	Angie Craig (incumbent)	165,583	50.9
Republican	Tyler Kistner	148,576	45.6
Legal Marijuana Now	Paula Overby †	10,728	3.3
Write-in		585	0.2
Total votes		325,472	100.0
Democratic (DFL) hold			

== District 3 ==
2022 Minnesota's 3rd congressional district election
- November 8, 2022
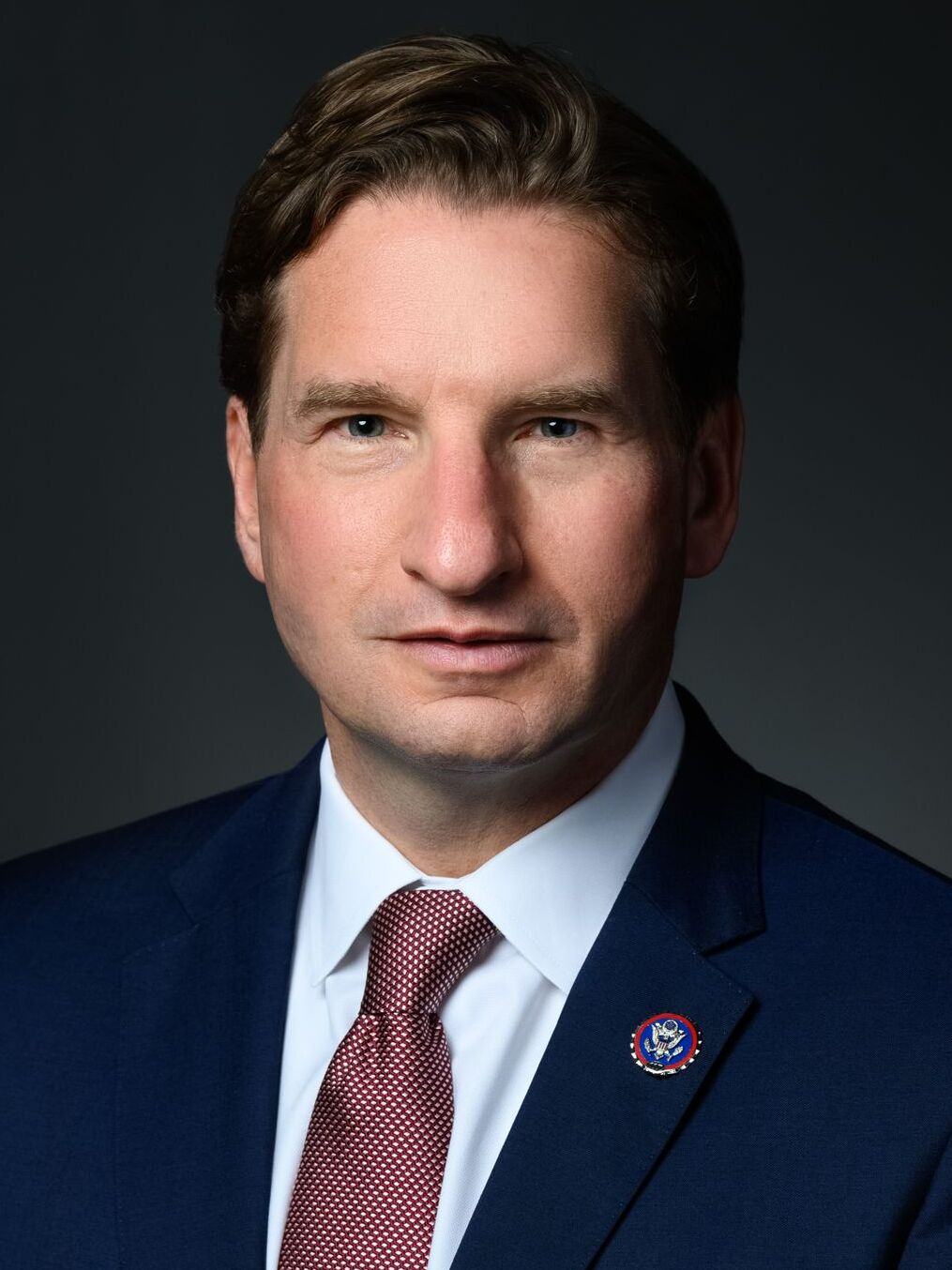

Nominee	Dean Phillips	Tom Weiler
Party	Democratic (DFL)	Republican
Popular vote	198,883	134,797
Percentage	59.6%	40.4%
- Phillips: 40–50% 50–60% 60–70% 70–80% 80–90% ≥90% Weiler: 40–50% 50–60% 60–70% 70–80% 80–90% ≥90% Tie: 40–50% No votes
U.S. Representative before election
Dean Phillips
Democratic (DFL)
Elected U.S. Representative
Dean Phillips
Democratic (DFL)

The 3rd district encompasses the western suburbs of the Twin Cities, including Brooklyn Park, Coon Rapids to the northeast, Bloomington to the south, and Eden Prairie, Edina, Maple Grove, Plymouth, Minnetonka, and Wayzata to the west. The incumbent was Democrat Dean Phillips, who was reelected with 55.6% of the vote in 2020.

=== Democratic primary ===
==== Candidates ====
===== Nominee =====
- Dean Phillips, incumbent U.S. representative

==== Endorsements ====
Dean Phillips

Organizations

- Democratic Majority for Israel
- End Citizens United
- Planned Parenthood Action Fund
- Sierra Club

=== Republican primary ===
==== Candidates ====
===== Nominee =====
- Tom Weiler, Navy officer

===== Not on the ballot =====
- Mark Blaxill, businessman and former Minnesota Republican Party treasurer

==== Debate ====
2022 Minnesota's 3rd congressional district republican primary debate
No.	Date	Host	Moderator	Link	Republican	Republican
Key: P Participant A Absent N Not invited I Invited W Withdrawn						
Key: P Participant A Absent N Not invited I Invited W Withdrawn					Mark Blaxill	Tom Weiler
1	Apr. 11, 2022	3rd District Republican Party of Minnesota	Mitch Berg		P	P

=== General election ===
==== Predictions ====
Source	Ranking	As of
The Cook Political Report	Solid D	February 10, 2022
Inside Elections	Solid D	April 7, 2022
Sabato's Crystal Ball	Safe D	February 16, 2022
Politico	Solid D	April 5, 2022
RCP	Likely D	June 9, 2022
Fox News	Solid D	September 20, 2022
DDHQ	Solid D	July 20, 2022
538	Solid D	June 30, 2022
The Economist	Safe D	September 28, 2022

==== Polling ====
Poll source	Date(s) administered	Sample size	Margin of error	Dean Phillips (DFL)	Tom Weiler (R)	Undecided
GQR Research (D) (Note: This poll was sponsored by Phillips's campaign.)	July 28 – August 1, 2022	507 (LV)	± 3.8%	57%	36%	8%

Hypothetical polling

Generic Democrat vs. generic Republican

Poll source	Date(s) administered	Sample size	Margin of error	Generic Democrat	Generic Republican	Undecided
GQR Research (D)	July 2022	507 (LV)	± 3.8%	54%	38%	9%

==== Results ====
2022 Minnesota's 3rd congressional district election
Party	Candidate	Votes	%
Democratic (DFL)	Dean Phillips (incumbent)	198,883	59.6
Republican	Tom Weiler	134,797	40.4
Write-in		241	0.1
Total votes		333,921	100.0
Democratic (DFL) hold			

== District 4 ==
2022 Minnesota's 4th congressional district election
- November 8, 2022
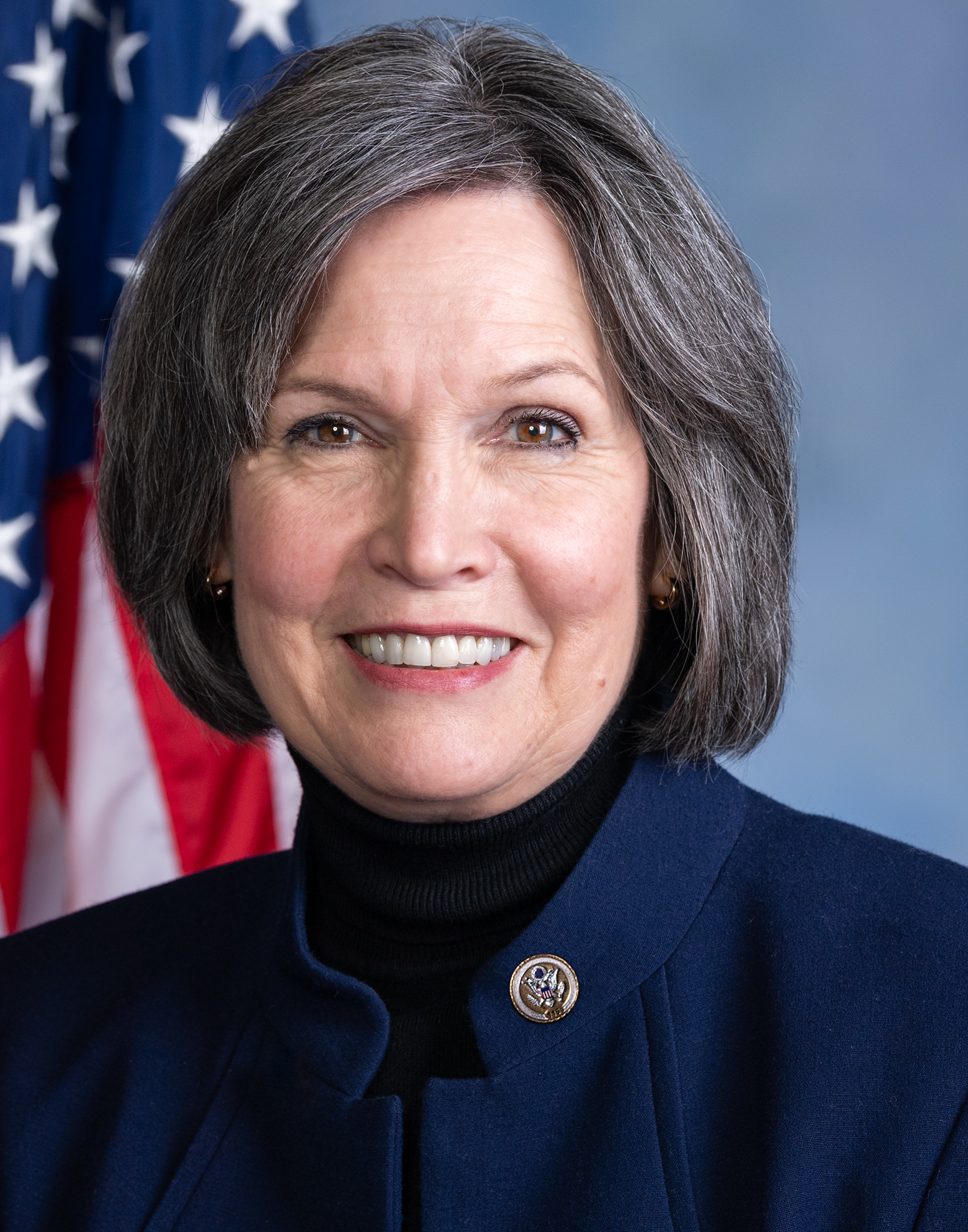

Nominee	Betty McCollum	May Lor Xiong
Party	Democratic (DFL)	Republican
Popular vote	200,055	95,493
Percentage	67.6%	32.3%
- Precinct results McCollum: 40–50% 50–60% 60–70% 70–80% 80–90% ≥90% Xiong: 40–50% 50–60% 60–70% 70–80% 80–90% ≥90% Tie: 40–50% No votes
U.S. Representative before election
Betty McCollum
Democratic (DFL)
Elected U.S. Representative
Betty McCollum
Democratic (DFL)

The 4th district encompasses the Saint Paul half of the Twin Cities metro area, including Ramsey County and parts of Washington County. The incumbent was Democrat Betty McCollum, who was reelected with 63.2% of the vote in 2020.

=== Democratic primary ===
==== Candidates ====
===== Nominee =====
- Betty McCollum, incumbent U.S. representative

===== Eliminated in primary =====
- Amane Badhasso, organizer and activist
- Fasil Moghul, landlord

==== Endorsements ====
Amane Badhasso

Organizations

- TakeAction Minnesota
Betty McCollum

U.S. senators

- Amy Klobuchar, U.S. senator from Minnesota (2007–)
- Tina Smith, U.S. senator from Minnesota (2018–)

U.S. representatives

- Angie Craig, U.S. representative from Minnesota's 2nd congressional district (2019–)
- Dean Phillips, U.S. representative from Minnesota's 3rd congressional district (2019–)

Statewide officials

- Keith Ellison, attorney general of Minnesota (2019–)
- Peggy Flanagan, lieutenant governor of Minnesota (2019–)
- Tim Walz, governor of Minnesota (2019–)

Local officials

- Melvin Carter, mayor of St. Paul (2018–)

Organizations

- Feminist Majority PAC
- J Street
- Jewish Voice for Peace Action Fund
- League of Conservation Voters Action Fund
- Planned Parenthood Action Fund
- Sierra Club

Labor unions

- United Auto Workers

==== Results ====
Democratic–Farmer–Labor primary results
Party	Candidate	Votes	%
Democratic (DFL)	Betty McCollum (incumbent)	58,043	83.4
Democratic (DFL)	Amane Badhasso	10,557	15.2
Democratic (DFL)	Fasil Moghul	997	1.4
Total votes		69,597	100.0

=== Republican primary ===
==== Candidates ====
===== Nominee =====
- May Lor Xiong, Saint Paul Public Schools teacher and Hmong refugee

===== Eliminated in primary =====
- Gene Rechtzigel, farmer and perennial candidate
- Jerry Silver, pastor

==== Results ====
Republican primary results
Party	Candidate	Votes	%
Republican	May Lor Xiong	9,574	44.1
Republican	Jerry Silver	7,399	34.1
Republican	Gene Rechtzigel	4,753	21.9
Total votes		21,726	100.0

=== General election ===
==== Predictions ====
Source	Ranking	As of
The Cook Political Report	Solid D	February 10, 2022
Inside Elections	Solid D	April 7, 2022
Sabato's Crystal Ball	Safe D	February 16, 2022
Politico	Solid D	April 5, 2022
RCP	Safe D	June 9, 2022
Fox News	Solid D	July 11, 2022
DDHQ	Solid D	July 20, 2022
538	Solid D	June 30, 2022
The Economist	Safe D	September 28, 2022

==== Results ====
2022 Minnesota's 4th congressional district election
Party	Candidate	Votes	%
Democratic (DFL)	Betty McCollum (incumbent)	200,055	67.6
Republican	May Lor Xiong	95,493	32.3
Write-in		425	0.1
Total votes		295,973	100.0
Democratic (DFL) hold			

== District 5 ==
2022 Minnesota's 5th congressional district election
- November 8, 2022
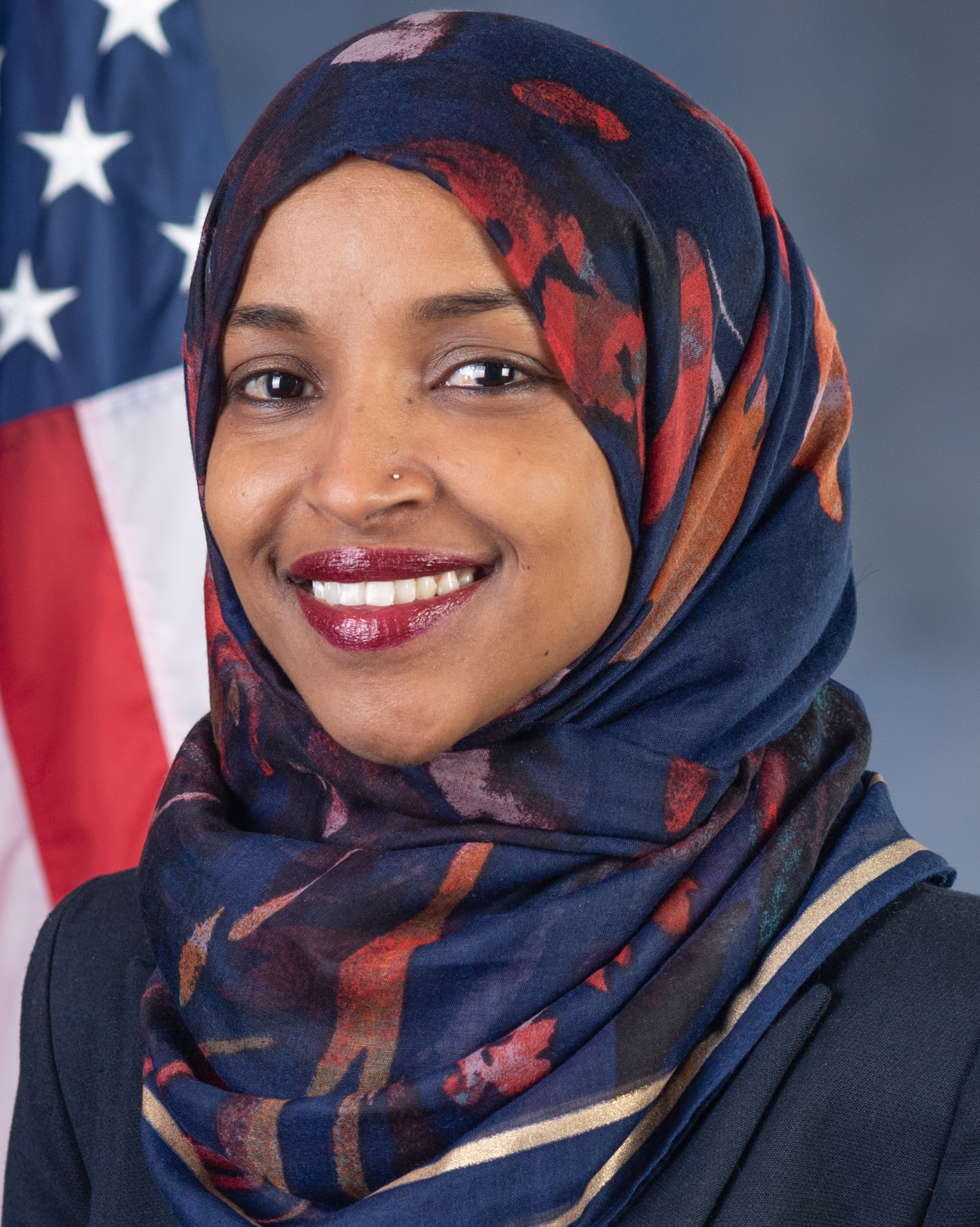

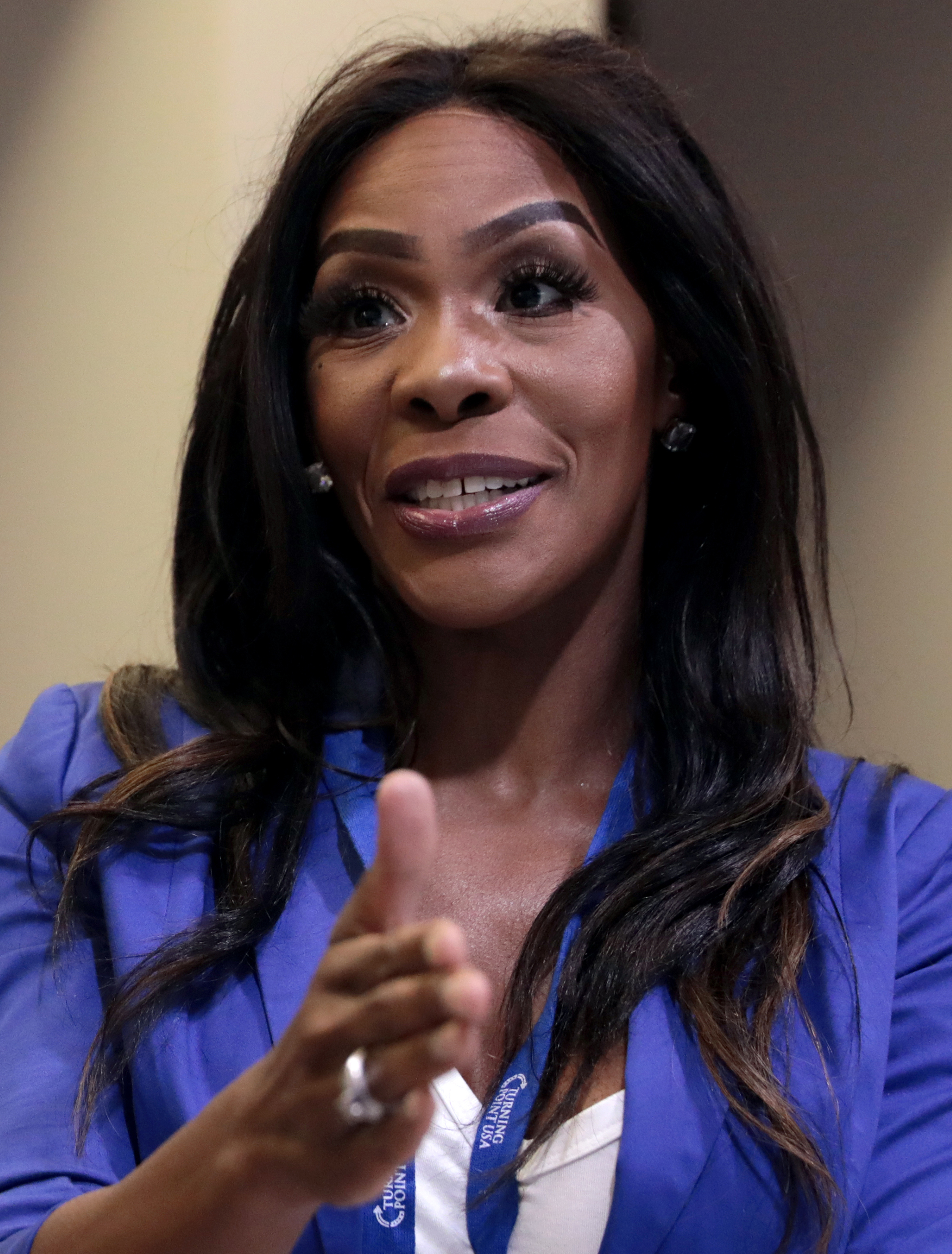
Nominee	Ilhan Omar	Cicely Davis
Party	Democratic (DFL)	Republican
Popular vote	214,224	70,702
Percentage	74.3%	24.5%
- Precinct results Omar: 50–60% 60–70% 70–80% 80–90% >90% Davis: 40–50% 50–60%
U.S. Representative before election
Ilhan Omar
Democratic (DFL)
Elected U.S. Representative
Ilhan Omar
Democratic (DFL)

The 5th district encompasses eastern Hennepin County, including all of Minneapolis and the cities of St. Louis Park, Richfield, Crystal, Robbinsdale, Golden Valley, New Hope, and Fridley. The incumbent was Democrat Ilhan Omar, who was reelected with 64.3% of the vote in 2020.

The 5th district had the fewest number of total votes in the general election out of all of Minnesota's congressional districts. Conversely, it featured the greatest number of total votes cast in the district's competitive primary election compared to other districts in the state.

=== Democratic primary ===
==== Candidates ====
===== Nominee =====
- Ilhan Omar, incumbent U.S. representative

===== Eliminated in primary =====
- A. J. Kern, land planner and perennial candidate
- Albert Ross, construction contractor
- Don Samuels, former Minneapolis City Councillor
- Nate Schluter

==== Endorsements ====
Ilhan Omar

U.S. senators

- Elizabeth Warren, U.S. senator from Massachusetts (2013–)

U.S. representatives

- Alexandria Ocasio-Cortez, U.S. representative from New York's 14th congressional district (2019–)
- Nancy Pelosi, Speaker of the United States House of Representatives (2007–2011; 2019–); U.S. representative from California's 12th congressional district (1987–)

Organizations

- Democracy for America
- End Citizens United
- Indivisible
- Jewish Voice for Peace Action Fund
- Justice Democrats
- Minnesota DFL
- Planned Parenthood Action Fund
- Progressive Democrats of America
- Sierra Club
- Sunrise Movement
- TakeAction Minnesota
- Working Families Party
Don Samuels

State officials

- Joan Growe, former Minnesota Secretary of State (1975–1999)
- Mike Hatch, former Minnesota Attorney General (1999–2007), former chair of the Democratic–Farmer–Labor Party (1980–1983)

Local officials

- Medaria Arradondo, former chief of the Minneapolis Police Department (2017–2022)
- Jacob Frey, mayor of Minneapolis (2018–)

Labor unions

- International Union of Operating Engineers Local 49
- United Steelworkers

Individuals

- Mike Erlandson, former chair of the Democratic–Farmer–Labor Party (1999–2005)
- Todd Otis, former chair of the Democratic–Farmer–Labor Party (1990–1993)

Newspapers

- Star Tribune

==== Polling ====
Poll source	Date(s) administered	Sample size	Margin of error	Ilhan Omar	Don Samuels	Khanh Tran	Undecided
Change Research (D) (Note: This poll was sponsored by Omar's campaign.)	May 27 – June 3, 2022	754 (LV)	± 3.9%	60%	17%	1%	21%

==== Results ====
Results by precinct: Omar: 40–50%; 50–60%; 60–70%; 70–80%; 80–90%; Samuels: 40–50%; 50–60%; 60–70%; 70–80%; 80–90%; Tie: 40–50%

Democratic–Farmer–Labor primary results
Party	Candidate	Votes	%
Democratic (DFL)	Ilhan Omar (incumbent)	57,683	50.3
Democratic (DFL)	Don Samuels	55,217	48.2
Democratic (DFL)	Nate Schluter	671	0.6
Democratic (DFL)	A. J. Kern	519	0.5
Democratic (DFL)	Albert Ross	477	0.4
Total votes		114,567	100.0

=== Republican primary ===
==== Candidates ====
===== Nominee =====
- Cicely Davis, businesswoman

===== Eliminated in primary =====
- Guy Gaskin
- Royce White, MMA fighter and former NBA player

===== Disqualified =====
- Shukri Abdirahman, U.S. Army veteran

==== Endorsements ====
Cicely Davis

Organizations

- Turning Point Action

==== Results ====
Republican primary results
Party	Candidate	Votes	%
Republican	Cicely Davis	4,765	48.0
Republican	Royce White	3,689	37.2
Republican	Guy Gaskin	1,476	14.9
Total votes		9,930	100.0

=== General election ===
==== Predictions ====
Source	Ranking	As of
The Cook Political Report	Solid D	February 10, 2022
Inside Elections	Solid D	April 7, 2022
Sabato's Crystal Ball	Safe D	February 16, 2022
Politico	Solid D	April 5, 2022
RCP	Safe D	June 9, 2022
Fox News	Solid D	July 11, 2022
DDHQ	Solid D	July 20, 2022
538	Solid D	June 30, 2022
The Economist	Safe D	September 28, 2022

==== Results ====
2022 Minnesota's 5th congressional district election
Party	Candidate	Votes	%
Democratic (DFL)	Ilhan Omar (incumbent)	214,224	74.3
Republican	Cicely Davis	70,702	24.5
Write-in		3,280	1.1
Total votes		288,206	100.0
Democratic (DFL) hold			

== District 6 ==
2022 Minnesota's 6th congressional district election
- November 8, 2022
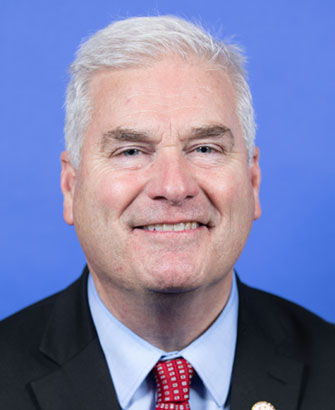

Nominee	Tom Emmer	Jeanne Hendricks
Party	Republican	Democratic (DFL)
Popular vote	198,145	120,852
Percentage	62.0%	37.8%
- Emmer: 50–60% 60–70% 70–80% 80–90% >90% Hendricks: 50–60% 60–70% 70–80% 80–90% Tie: 40–50% No votes
U.S. Representative before election
Tom Emmer
Republican
Elected U.S. Representative
Tom Emmer
Republican

The 6th district encompasses the northern suburbs and exurbs of Minneapolis, including all of Benton, Sherburne, and Wright counties and parts of Anoka, Carver, Stearns, and Washington counties. The incumbent was Republican Tom Emmer, who was reelected with 65.7% of the vote in 2020.

=== Republican primary ===
==== Candidates ====
===== Nominee =====
- Tom Emmer, incumbent U.S. representative and chair of the National Republican Congressional Committee

==== Endorsements ====
Tom Emmer

Organizations

- Pro-Israel America

=== Democratic primary ===
==== Candidates ====
===== Nominee =====
- Jeanne Hendricks, nurse

=== General election ===
==== Predictions ====
Source	Ranking	As of
The Cook Political Report	Solid R	February 10, 2022
Inside Elections	Solid R	April 7, 2022
Sabato's Crystal Ball	Safe R	February 16, 2022
Politico	Solid R	April 5, 2022
RCP	Safe R	June 9, 2022
Fox News	Solid R	July 11, 2022
DDHQ	Solid R	July 20, 2022
538	Solid R	June 30, 2022
The Economist	Safe R	September 28, 2022

==== Results ====
2022 Minnesota's 6th congressional district election
Party	Candidate	Votes	%
Republican	Tom Emmer (incumbent)	198,145	62.0
Democratic (DFL)	Jeanne Hendricks	120,852	37.8
Write-in		770	0.2
Total votes		319,767	100.0
Republican hold			

== District 7 ==
2022 Minnesota's 7th congressional district election
- November 8, 2022
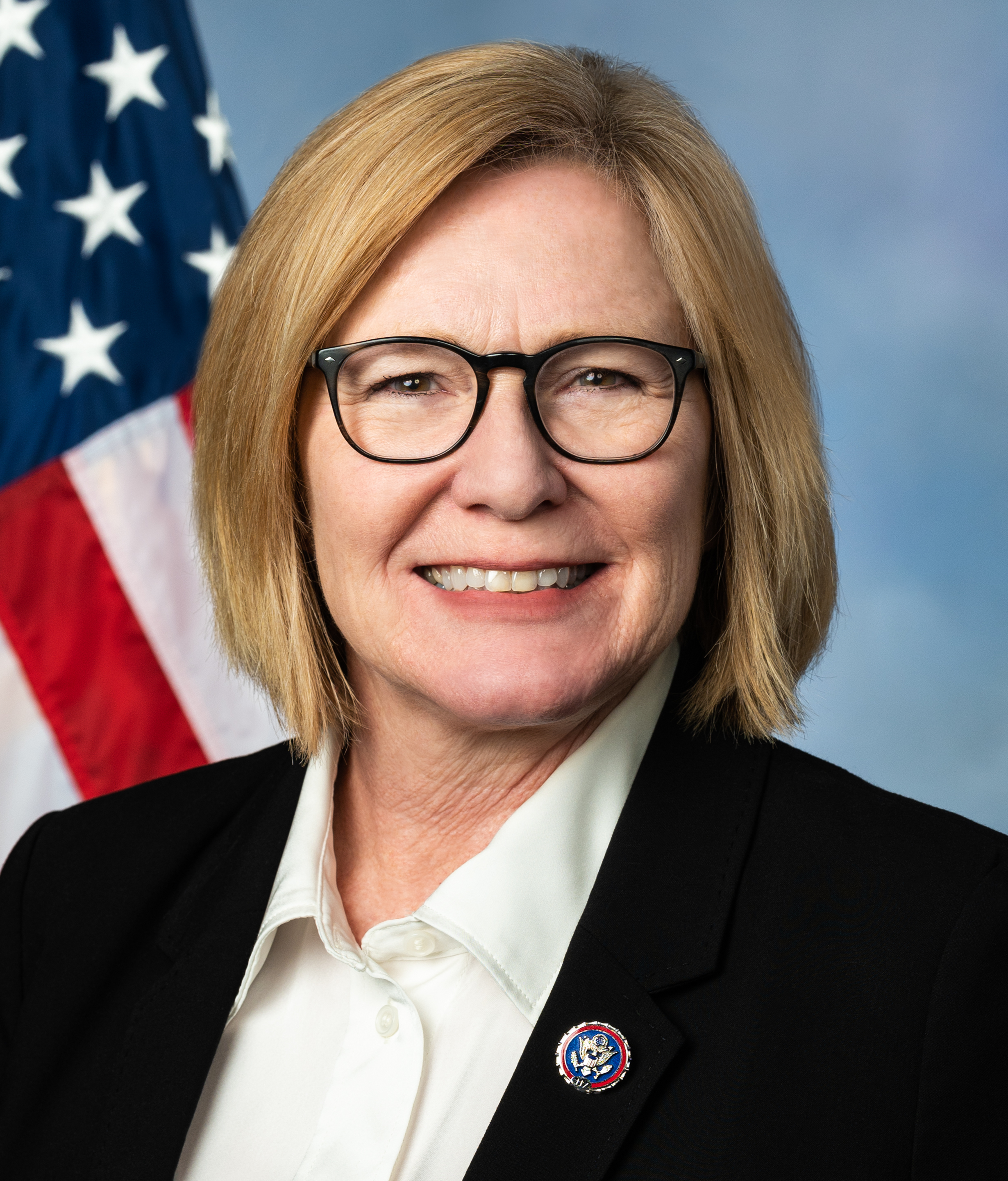

Nominee	Michelle Fischbach	Jill Abahsain	Travis Johnson
Party	Republican	Democratic (DFL)	Legal Marijuana Now
Popular vote	204,766	84,455	16,421
Percentage	66.9%	27.6%	5.4%
- Fischbach: 40–50% 50–60% 60–70% 70–80% 80–90% ≥90% Abahsain: 40–50% 50–60% 60–70% 70–80% 80–90% ≥90% Tie: 40–50% No votes
U.S. Representative before election
Michelle Fischbach
Republican
Elected U.S. Representative
Michelle Fischbach
Republican

The 7th district covers all but the southern end of rural western Minnesota, and includes the cities of Moorhead, Willmar, Alexandria, and Fergus Falls. The incumbent was Republican Michelle Fischbach, who flipped the district and was elected with 53.4% of the vote in 2020, ousting long-time Democratic incumbent Collin Peterson.

=== Republican primary ===
==== Candidates ====
===== Nominee =====
- Michelle Fischbach, incumbent U.S. representative

==== Endorsements ====
Michelle Fischbach

Federal officials

- Nikki Haley, former United States ambassador to the United Nations (2017–2018) and former governor of South Carolina (2011–2017)

Organizations

- Lac qui Parle County Republican Party
- Maggie's List
- Seventh Congressional District Republican Party of Minnesota
- Turning Point Action

==== Results ====
Republican primary results
Party	Candidate	Votes	%
Republican	Michelle Fischbach (incumbent)	59,429	100.0
Total votes		59,429	100.0

=== Democratic primary ===
==== Candidates ====
===== Nominee =====
- Jill Abahsain, museum director, and former teacher

===== Eliminated in primary =====
- Alycia Gruenhagen, candidate for this district in 2020

===== Withdrawn =====
- Mark Lindquist, veteran and national anthem singer for the NFL
- Reed Olson, Beltrami County commissioner (running for Minnesota State House)
- Ernest Oppegaard-Peltier, progressive activist (running for Congressional District 8)

==== Endorsements ====
Jill Abahsain

Organizations

- Vote Common Good

==== Results ====
Primary results by county: Abahsain: 50–60%; 60–70%; 70–80%; Gruenhagen: 50–60%

Democratic–Farmer–Labor primary results
Party	Candidate	Votes	%
Democratic (DFL)	Jill Abahsain	14,352	59.0
Democratic (DFL)	Alycia Gruenhagen	9,973	41.0
Total votes		24,325	100.0

=== Independent and third-party candidates ===
==== Legal Marijuana Now ====
===== Candidates =====
====== Nominee ======
- Travis Johnson, farmer

Legal Marijuana Now primary results
Party	Candidate	Votes	%
Legal Marijuana Now	Travis Johnson	509	100.0
Total votes		509	100.0

==== Libertarian primary ====
===== Candidates =====
====== Withdrawn ======
- Travis Johnson (running as Legal Marijuana Now)

==== Independent ====
===== Candidates =====
====== Withdrawn ======
- Mark Lindquist, veteran and national anthem singer for the NFL (suspended campaign to assist Ukraine in territorial defence or humanitarian aid)

=== General election ===
==== Predictions ====
Source	Ranking	As of
The Cook Political Report	Solid R	February 10, 2022
Inside Elections	Solid R	April 7, 2022
Sabato's Crystal Ball	Safe R	February 16, 2022
Politico	Solid R	April 5, 2022
RCP	Safe R	June 9, 2022
Fox News	Solid R	July 11, 2022
DDHQ	Solid R	July 20, 2022
538	Solid R	June 30, 2022
The Economist	Safe R	September 28, 2022

==== Results ====
2022 Minnesota's 7th congressional district election
Party	Candidate	Votes	%
Republican	Michelle Fischbach (incumbent)	204,766	66.9
Democratic (DFL)	Jill Abahsain	84,455	27.6
Legal Marijuana Now	Travis Johnson	16,421	5.4
Write-in		224	0.1
Total votes		305,866	100.0
Republican hold			

== District 8 ==
2022 Minnesota's 8th congressional district election
- November 8, 2022
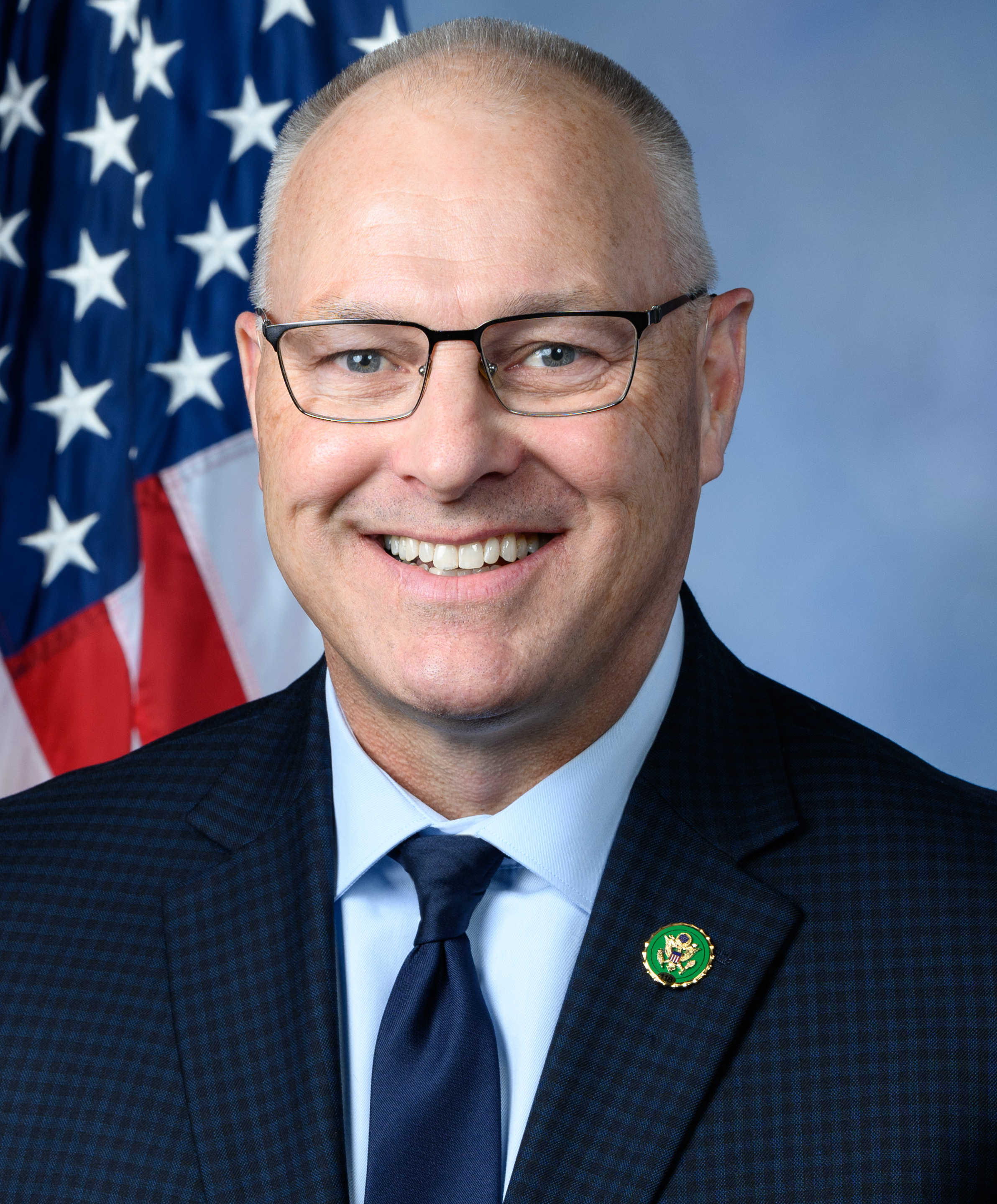

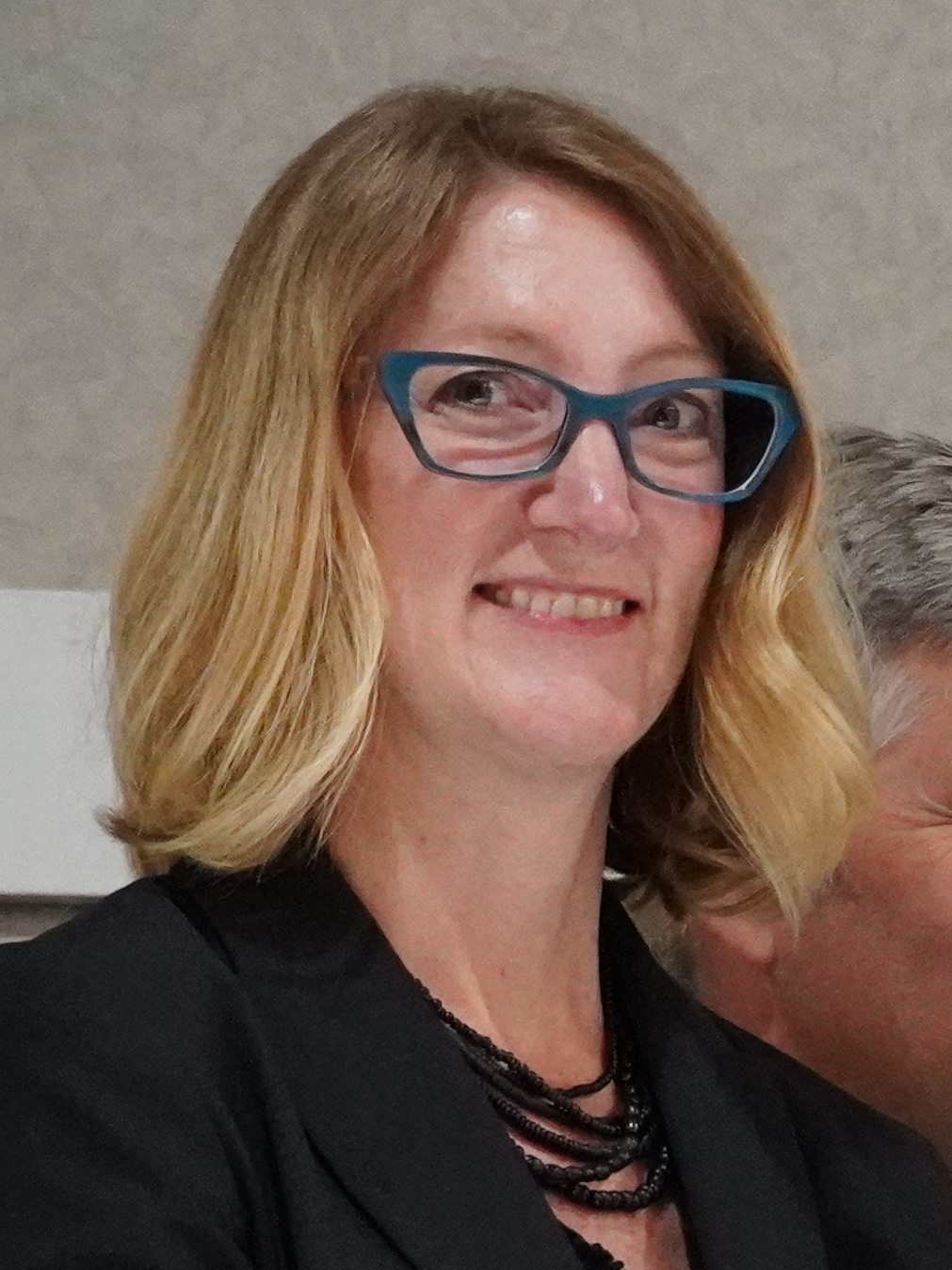
Nominee	Pete Stauber	Jennifer Schultz
Party	Republican	Democratic (DFL)
Popular vote	188,755	141,009
Percentage	57.2%	42.7%
- Stauber: 40–50% 50–60% 60–70% 70–80% 80–90% ≥90% Schultz: 40–50% 50–60% 60–70% 70–80% 80–90% ≥90% Tie: 40–50% No votes
U.S. Representative before election
Pete Stauber
Republican
Elected U.S. Representative
Pete Stauber
Republican

The 8th district is based in the Iron Range and home to the city of Duluth. The incumbent was Republican Pete Stauber, who was reelected with 56.7% of the vote in 2020.

=== Republican primary ===
==== Candidates ====
===== Nominee =====
- Pete Stauber, incumbent U.S. representative

===== Eliminated in primary =====
- Harry Robb Welty, former Duluth School Board member, candidate for this district in 2018 and 2020

==== Endorsements ====
Pete Stauber

Organizations

- Citizens for Responsible Energy Solutions
- Pro-Israel America

Labor unions

- International Union of Operating Engineers Local 49 (post-primary)

==== Results ====
Republican primary results
Party	Candidate	Votes	%
Republican	Pete Stauber (incumbent)	51,410	91.0
Republican	Harry Robb Welty	5,075	9.0
Total votes		56,485	100.0

=== Democratic primary ===
==== Candidates ====
===== Nominee =====
- Jennifer Schultz, state representative (7A)

===== Eliminated in primary =====
- John Munter

===== Withdrew =====
- Theresa Lastovich, researcher

==== Endorsements ====
Jennifer Schultz

Elected officials

- Emily Larson, mayor of Duluth
- Rick Nolan, former U.S. representative (MN-8)

Organizations

- Minnesota Democratic–Farmer–Labor Party
- Moms Demand Action For Gun Sense in America
- Stonewall Democrats
- TakeAction Minnesota
- United Food and Commercial Workers Local 1189

==== Results ====
Democratic–Farmer–Labor primary results
Party	Candidate	Votes	%
Democratic (DFL)	Jen Schultz	38,545	86.1
Democratic (DFL)	John Munter	6,199	13.9
Total votes		44,744	100.0

=== General election ===
==== Debate ====
2022 Minnesota's 8th congressional district debate
No.	Date	Host	Moderator	Link	Republican	Democratic–Farmer–Labor
Key: P Participant A Absent N Not invited I Invited W Withdrawn						
Key: P Participant A Absent N Not invited I Invited W Withdrawn					Pete Stauber	Jennifer Schultz
1	Oct. 19, 2022	WDIO-DT	Darren Danielson; Baihly Warfield		P	P

==== Predictions ====
Source	Ranking	As of
The Cook Political Report	Solid R	February 10, 2022
Inside Elections	Solid R	April 7, 2022
Sabato's Crystal Ball	Safe R	February 16, 2022
Politico	Likely R	April 5, 2022
RCP	Safe R	June 9, 2022
Fox News	Solid R	July 11, 2022
DDHQ	Solid R	July 20, 2022
538	Solid R	June 30, 2022
The Economist	Safe R	September 28, 2022

==== Results ====
2022 Minnesota's 8th congressional district election
Party	Candidate	Votes	%
Republican	Pete Stauber (incumbent)	188,755	57.2
Democratic (DFL)	Jennifer Schultz	141,009	42.7
Write-in		316	0.1
Total votes		330,080	100.0
Republican hold			

== See also ==
- 2022 Minnesota elections

== Notes ==
Partisan clients
