= Jeremy Munson =

American politician

Member of the Minnesota House of Representatives from the 23B district
- In office February 20, 2018 – January 3, 2023
- Preceded by: Tony Cornish
- Succeeded by: Bjorn Olson

Personal details
- Born: December 31, 1975 (age 50) Brainerd, Minnesota, U.S.
- Party: Republican
- Children: 2
- Education: University of Minnesota, Crookston (BS)

Jeremy Munson (born December 31, 1975) is an American businessman and politician. A member of the Republican Party of Minnesota, Munson represented District 23B in the Minnesota House of Representatives. He lives on a farm outside Lake Crystal, Minnesota.

== Early life and education ==
Munson grew up in Brainerd, Minnesota. He earned a Bachelor of Science degree in business from the University of Minnesota Crookston.

== Career ==
After graduating from college, Munson lived in New York City for a year and worked as an account manager for RBC Capital Markets. He is a self-employed business consultant in regulatory compliance. He has since worked as a business analyst for the Taylor Corporation, Target, Ameriprise Financial, Allianz Life, Prime Therapeutics, Edina Realty, Aon, and the Andersen Corporation. In 2013, he founded Minnesota Hops Company, which specializes in growing hops for Minnesota's craft brewing industry.

Munson was chair of the Blue Earth County Republican Party for two years before becoming chair of the Minnesota's 1st congressional district Republicans in 2017. He stepped down from this position to run in the 2018 special election.

=== Minnesota House of Representatives ===
Munson was elected to the Minnesota House of Representatives in a 2018 special election, succeeding Republican incumbent Tony Cornish, who, after facing sexual harassment and assault allegations from multiple women who worked as staffers, legislators and lobbyists, signed a settlement agreement with one of the women and resigned from office. In December 2018, Munson and three other House members formed a separate New House Republican Caucus out of dissatisfaction with the House minority leadership.

Throughout his time in the legislature, Munson authored numerous bills, including HF0638 and HF2518 that supported patient's right to shop for medical care, worked on price transparency, and created a shared savings account that would allow patients to share in any savings. Munson also authored HF 2578 to propose term limits. On March 25, 2021, Munson proposed HF2423, a bill that would cede several Minnesota counties to South Dakota. Munson claimed, "Minnesota becomes more politically polarized every year and the metro politicians have shown us that rural Minnesotans are no longer represented by Saint Paul. It's time to leave. Rural Minnesotans love their communities and neighbors, but they want better governance" South Dakota governor Kristi Noem supported his idea. Munson was also one of seven Minnesota lawmakers to sign a letter demanding that states decertify their election results because he said thirteen states, including Minnesota, did not follow their own election laws. He always maintained that if election laws are not followed, the results are not valid. He further argued that many states, including Minnesota, needed better safe guards on their elections to not only prevent fraud, but to also identify and remove any ballets found to be fraudulently cast.

His second term in office, Munson was invited to be part of the joint House and Senate healthcare committee that resulted in the passing of legislation aimed at preventing kickbacks between Pharmacy Benefit Managers (PBMs) and creating better transparency. This legislation was signed into law and included the language from Munson's price transparency bill that allowed patients with health insurance to pay the lower cash price when the cash price was lower than the negotiated insurance price.

=== U.S. House of Representatives special election campaign ===
In February 2022, Munson filed paperwork to run in the Minnesota's 1st congressional district special election to replace U.S. Representative Jim Hagedorn, who had died of kidney cancer earlier that month. He has been endorsed by U.S. Senator Rand Paul and U.S. Representatives Jim Jordan, Thomas Massie, and Scott Perry.

Munson faced fellow state representative Nels Pierson, former state representative Brad Finstad, and former Minnesota Republican Party chair Jennifer Carnahan in the August 9 primary election.

Munson lost the special primary election and the general primary election to Finstad, who won the general election for the seat in both August and November.

== Electoral history ==
2022 General Republican primary results
| Party | Candidate | Votes | % |
|---|---|---|---|
| Republican | Brad Finstad | 48,252 | 76.0 |
| Republican | Jeremy Munson | 15,207 | 24.0 |
| Total votes | | 63,459 | 100.0 |

2022 Special Republican primary results
| Party | Candidate | Votes | % |
|---|---|---|---|
| Republican | Brad Finstad | 13,695 | 38.12 |
| Republican | Jeremy Munson | 13,268 | 36.93 |
| Republican | Jennifer Carnahan | 2,887 | 8.04 |
| Republican | Matt Benda | 2,629 | 7.32 |
| Republican | Nels Pierson | 1,878 | 5.22 |
| Republican | Kevin Kocina | 960 | 2.67 |
| Republican | Bob Carney Jr. | 193 | 0.54 |
| Republican | Roger Ungemach | 151 | 0.42 |
| Republican | J.R. Ewing | 142 | 0.40 |
| Republican | Ken Navitsky | 127 | 0.35 |
| Total votes | | 35,930 | 100.00 |

2020 Minnesota House of Representatives general election, District 23B
| Party | Candidate | Votes | % |
|---|---|---|---|
| Republican | Jeremy Munson | 13,919 | 64.7 |
| Democratic (DFL) | Leroy McClelland | 7,577 | 35.2 |
| Write-in | | 27 | 0.1 |
| Total votes | | 21,523 | 100.00 |

2018 Minnesota House of Representatives special election, District 23B
| Party | Candidate | Votes | % |
|---|---|---|---|
| Republican | Jeremy Munson | 3,941 | 59.21 |
| Democratic (DFL) | Melissa Wagner | 2,658 | 39.93 |
| Write-in | | 57 | 0.86 |
| Total votes | | 6,656 | 100.00 |

2018 Minnesota House of Representatives general election, District 23B
| Party | Candidate | Votes | % |
|---|---|---|---|
| Republican | Jeremy Munson | 10,290 | 60.05 |
| Democratic (DFL) | Jim Grabowska | 6,827 | 39.84 |
| Write-in | | 19 | 0.11 |
| Total votes | | 17,136 | 100.00 |

== Personal life ==
Munson married Kallie Eberhart, of Madelia, Minnesota, in 2004. The couple have resided on their farm outside Lake Crystal, Minnesota since 2003. They have two daughters.
