= Mike Benson (politician) =

American politician

Member of the Minnesota House of Representatives from the 26B district 30B (2011–2013)
- In office January 4, 2011 – January 5, 2015
- Preceded by: Andy Welti
- Succeeded by: Nels Pierson

Personal details
- Born: November 9, 1955 (age 70)
- Party: Republican Party of Minnesota
- Spouse: Susan
- Children: 4
- Education: Eastern University
- Occupation: assistant college professor, director of human resources, legislator

Michael Benson (born November 9, 1955) is an American politician and former member of the Minnesota House of Representatives. A member of the Republican Party of Minnesota, he represented District 26B, which includes portions of Olmsted County in the southeastern part of the state. He is also an assistant college professor for business administration and the Director of Human Resources at Crossroads College in Rochester.

== Early life, education, and career ==
Benson was born in Springfield, Illinois but at an early age his family moved to Bloomington Illinois. He graduated from Bloomington High School in 1973. He started with the United States Postal Service that same year. Benson graduated from Eastern University in St. Davids, Pennsylvania, earning his B.A. in organizational management and, later, his M.B.A. He began his career with the U.S. Postal Service in 1973, holding various management positions until his retirement in 2004. He served as Postmaster of Rochester from 1988 until 1995 and, subsequently, served as Postmaster of Cleveland, Ohio, and Pittsburgh, Pennsylvania.

In 1998, Benson was appointed the postal service's district manager for an area of southeastern Pennsylvania consisting of 362 post offices and 3 processing plants with 6000 employees. From 1996-1998, he was a member of the National Joint Steering Committee for Quality of Work Life and Employee Involvement, a joint project between the National Rural Letter Carriers' Association and the U.S. Postal Service, and was also a member of the 1994 National Contract Negotiations Team.

Benson came to Crossroads College in 2004. In addition to his work as an assistant professor and Director of Human Resources, he served as the Director of Adult Studies and started the college's Compass Adult Degree Completion Program. He also served as the college’s interim president from 2006 until 2008 during the process to fill the vacancy.

== Minnesota House of Representatives ==
Benson was first elected to the House in 2010 and was re-elected in 2012. He did not run for re-election in 2014.

== 2014 United States congressional campaign ==
Benson announced on June 17, 2013 that he would run to represent Minnesota's 1st congressional district in the United States House of Representatives.
