= 2018 Minnesota House of Representatives district 23B special election =

District 23B special election, 2018
- February 12, 2018

Minnesota House of Representatives District 23B
Nominee	Jeremy Munson	Melissa Wagner
Party	Republican	Democratic (DFL)
Popular vote	3,941	2,658
Percentage	59.21%	39.93%
- Results by precinct
Representative before election
Tony Cornish
Republican
Elected Representative
Jeremy Munson
Republican

A special election was held in the U.S. state of Minnesota on February 12, 2018, to elect a new representative for District 23B in the Minnesota House of Representatives, caused by the resignation of Tony Cornish effective on November 30, 2017. A primary election was held on January 29, 2018, to nominate a Republican candidate. It coincided with the Minnesota Senate District 54 special election. The Republican nominee, Jeremy Munson, won the special election.

== Background ==
Location of District 23B in southern Minnesota.

In November 2017, several women accused Representative Tony Cornish of sexually harassing them. On November 21, 2017, Cornish announced he would resign by the end of the month, which he did on November 30, 2017.

District 23B represents parts of the counties of Blue Earth, Le Sueur, Waseca, and Watonwan. Cornish had represented the area since 2003, replacing retiring DFL incumbent Henry Kalis—who represented the area since 1975. In the last election in 2016, Cornish won with 67 percent of the vote compared to his DFL opponent's 34 percent.

== Candidates ==
Candidate filings were open from January 8 through January 11. As multiple Republican candidates filed for office, a primary election was held on January 29, 2018, to determine which candidate received the party's nomination.

=== Republican Party of Minnesota ===
District 23B Republican delegates held a convention to endorse a candidate on December 21, 2017. Chair of the Minnesota First Congressional District Republicans Jeremy Munson won the endorsement after one ballot with support of 75 percent of delegates. Watonwan County Commissioner Scott Sanders also sought the endorsement. Sanders did not confirm whether he would abide by it. He ended up filing on the last day of the filing period and cited support he received as well as people asking him to run over the previous several weeks as reasons in deciding to run. Sanders also said the time frame was too short for the endorsement process to work effectively.

- Jeremy Munson, chair of the Minnesota First Congressional District Republicans
- Scott Sanders, member of the Watonwan County Board of Commissioners since 2003

==== Withdrawn ====
- Brad Ahrenstorff, mayor of Lake Crystal
  - Said the short election time frame made it difficult for family and work scheduling.

=== Minnesota Democratic–Farmer–Labor Party ===
District 23B DFL delegates held a convention to endorse a candidate on December 28, 2017. Melissa Wagner won the endorsement.

- Melissa Wagner, school social worker

=== Write-in candidates ===
- Nicholas Schmitz (write-in candidate), middle school teacher
  - Cited the requirement of gathering 500 signatures over the four-day filing period for third party and independent candidates in deciding to run as a write-in candidate.

== Primary election ==
Scott Sanders' decision to continue to seek the Republican nomination was criticized by several local Republican officials, saying he was hindering Republican endorsed candidate Jeremy Munson's ability to concentrate on running against DFL nominee Melissa Wagner. The chair of the Le Sueur County Republicans, Al DeKruif, said Sanders was putting Munson at a disadvantage.

Shortly after the close of candidate filings, Cornish endorsed Sanders, saying he was "rock solid" on important issues, including Second Amendment protections. Cornish, who retained a lot of popularity in the district, said he decided to make an endorsement because he was receiving calls and questions from former constituents about whom they should support. Sanders appreciated the endorsement, saying he trusted and respected Cornish.

Several local and state Republican officials criticized Cornish for not supporting the endorsed candidate. DeKruif said Cornish did not deserve a say in the process due to the circumstances of his resignation. Munson said Cornish should not have made an endorsement so late in the election process. In response, Cornish said he had nothing to lose by making an endorsement since he did not plan on running for office ever again.

=== Results ===
Republican primary election results by precinct.

Jeremy Munson won the Republican nomination over Scott Sanders in the primary election. Munson said he was pleased with the results and that they reaffirmed the endorsement process. Sanders congratulated Munson and said he appreciated everyone who turned out to vote.

Party	Candidate	Votes	%
Republican Party of Minnesota	Jeremy Munson	1,477	54.46
Republican Party of Minnesota	Scott Sanders	1,235	45.54
Republican Party of Minnesota	Subtotal	2,712	100.00
Minnesota Democratic–Farmer–Labor Party	Melissa Wagner	482	100.00
Total		3,194	100.00
Invalid/blank votes		71	2.17
Turnout (out of 22,711 registered voters)		3,265	14.38
Source: Minnesota Secretary of State

== Results ==
Republican nominee Jeremy Munson won over DFL nominee Melissa Wagner. Republicans claimed their victory showed their agenda still had wide support among the electorate. Republican Party of Minnesota Chair Jennifer Carnahan said Munson's win proved Republican President Donald Trump was still popular in Greater Minnesota. Democrats had hopes that momentum seen in recent special election wins in other states would similarly show and translate into a victory for Wagner.

Party	Candidate	Votes	%	∆pp
Republican Party of Minnesota	Jeremy Munson	3,941	59.21	▼7.70
Minnesota Democratic–Farmer–Labor Party	Melissa Wagner	2,658	39.93	▲6.94
Write-in	Nicholas Schmitz	38	0.57	▲0.76
Write-in	N/A	19	0.29	▲0.76
Total		6,656	100.00	±0.00
Invalid/blank votes		4	0.06	▼2.43
Turnout (out of 22,795 registered voters)		6,660	29.22	▼52.62
Source: Minnesota Secretary of State

== See also ==
- List of special elections to the Minnesota House of Representatives
