= 2022 Minnesota's 1st congressional district special election =

- August 9, 2022

Minnesota's 1st congressional district
- Turnout: 29.5%
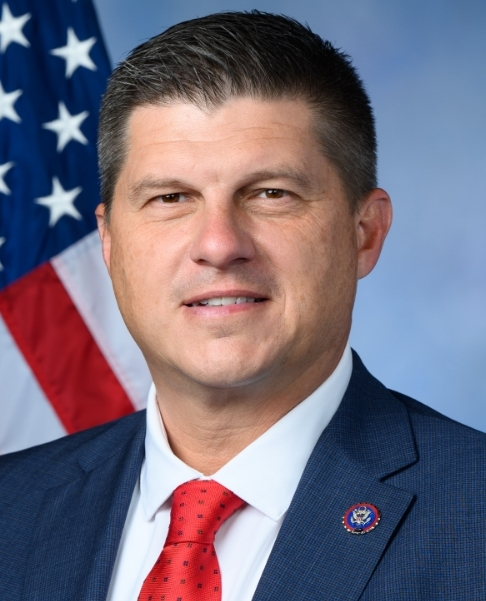

Nominee	Brad Finstad	Jeff Ettinger
Party	Republican	Democratic (DFL)
Popular vote	59,788	55,155
Percentage	50.7%	46.8%
- Finstad: 40–50% 50–60% 60–70% 70–80% 80–90% >90% Ettinger: 40–50% 50–60% 60–70% 70–80% 80–90% Tie: 40–50% 50% No votes
U.S. Representative before election
Jim Hagedorn
Republican
Elected U.S. Representative
Brad Finstad
Republican

The 2022 Minnesota's 1st congressional district special election was a special election held on August 9, 2022. The seat became vacant when incumbent Republican representative Jim Hagedorn died on February 17, 2022, from kidney cancer.

A primary was held on May 24, 2022, with the special election being held eleven weeks later, on August 9, alongside state primaries for other races. The special election was won by Republican Brad Finstad by a margin of 3.9%.

== Republican primary ==
=== Candidates ===
==== Nominee ====
- Brad Finstad, former Minnesota Director of USDA Rural Development and former state representative

==== Eliminated in primary ====
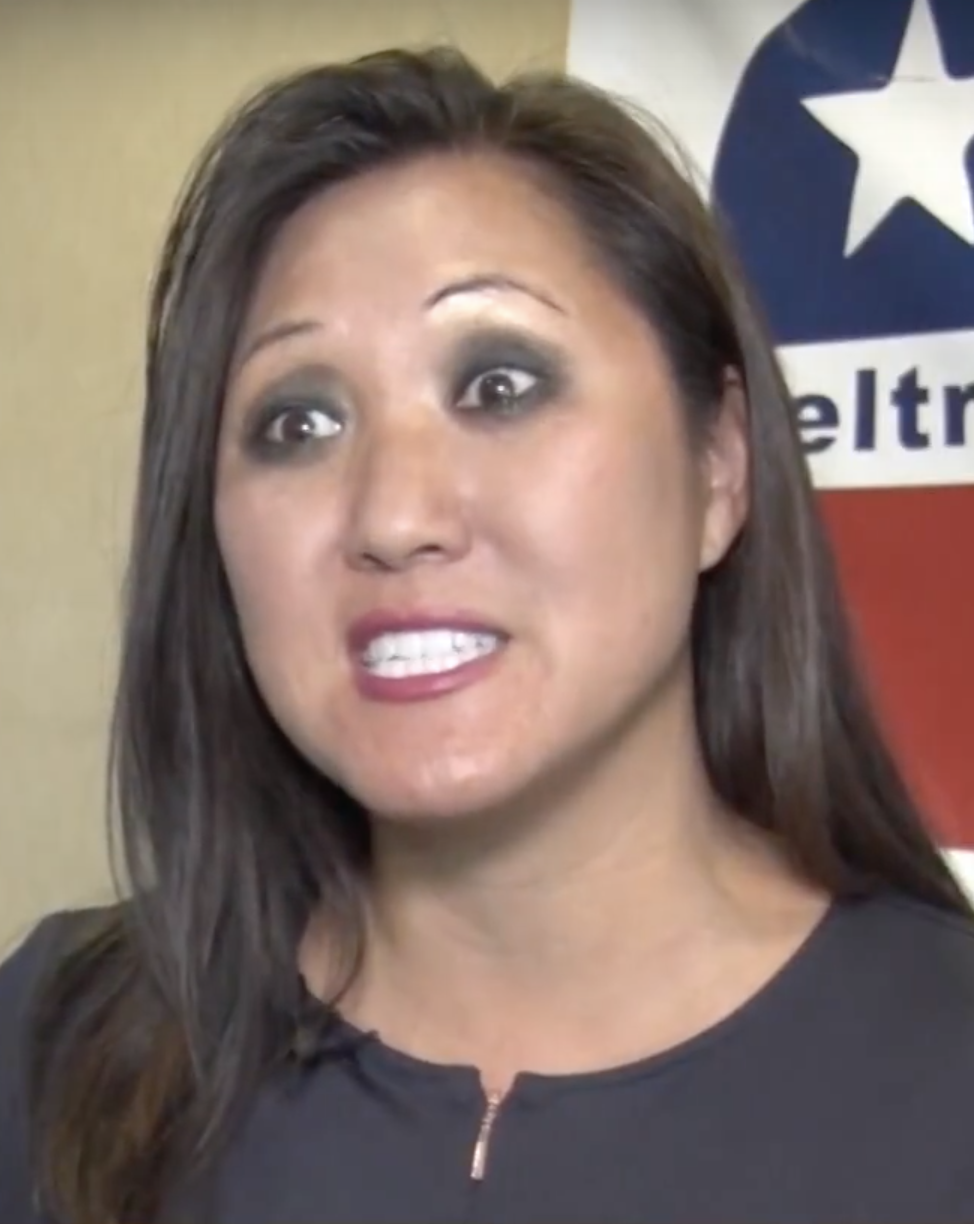
Former Minnesota GOP chair Jennifer Carnahan finished third in the primary.

- Matt Benda, agricultural law attorney
- Jennifer Carnahan, former chair of the Republican Party of Minnesota and Hagedorn's widow
- Bob Carney Jr., perennial candidate
- J. R. Ewing, general manager of a biofuels plant
- Kevin Kocina, U.S. Marine Corps veteran
- Jeremy Munson, state representative
- Nels Pierson, state representative
- Roger Ungemach, engineer and business analyst

==== Withdrawn ====
- Ken Navitsky, sales executive and former Minnesota State University placekicker (running for state senate)

==== Declined ====
- Jason Baskin, Austin city councilor
- Carla Nelson, state senator (running for re-election, endorsed Pierson)
- Julie Rosen, state senator (endorsed Finstad)

=== Endorsements ===
Jennifer Carnahan

Individuals

- Stanley Hubbard, chairman and chief executive officer of Hubbard Broadcasting (1983–present)
Brad Finstad

U.S. representatives

- Michelle Fischbach, U.S. representative for Minnesota's 7th congressional district (2021–present) and former lieutenant governor of Minnesota (2018–2019)
- Pete Stauber, U.S. representative for Minnesota's 8th congressional district (2019–present)
- Glenn Thompson, U.S. representative for Pennsylvania's 15th congressional district (2019–present) and Pennsylvania's 5th congressional district (2009–2019)

State legislators

- Paul Anderson, former state senator for the 44th district (2017–2021)
- Gary Dahms, state senator for the 16th district (2013–present) and the 21st district (2011–2013)
- Brian Daniels, state representative for the 24B district (2015–present)
- Rod Hamilton, state representative for the 22B district (2005–present)
- John Jasinski, state senator for the 24th district (2017–present)
- John Petersburg, state representative for the 24A district (2013–present)
- Julie Rosen, state senator for the 23rd district (2003–present)
- Marty Seifert, former Minority Leader of the Minnesota House of Representatives (2007–2009) for the 21A district (1997–2011)
- Paul Torkelson, state representative for the 16B district (2013–present) and the 21B district (2009–2013)

Individuals

- Bob Ulrich, former chief executive officer and chairman of the Target Corporation (1994–2009)

Organizations

- Koch Industries PAC
- Republican Main Street Partnership
Jeremy Munson

U.S. senators

- Ted Cruz, U.S. senator from Texas (2013–present)
- Rand Paul, U.S. senator from Kentucky (2011–present)

U.S. representatives

- Michele Bachmann, former U.S. representative for Minnesota's 6th congressional district (2007–2015) and candidate for president of the United States in 2012
- Jim Jordan, U.S. representative for Ohio's 4th congressional district (2007–present)
- Thomas Massie, U.S. representative for Kentucky's 4th congressional district (2013–present)
- Scott Perry, U.S. representative for Pennsylvania's 10th congressional district (2013–present)

State legislators

- Susan Akland, state representative for the 19A district (2021–present)
- Keith Downey, former state representative for the 41A district (2009–2013) and former chair of the Minnesota Republican Party (2013–2017)
- Scott Jensen, former state senator for the 47th district (2017–2021)
- Tim Miller, state representative for the 17A district (2015–present)
- Dennis Smith, former state representative for the 34B district (2015–2019)

Organizations

- FreedomWorks
- Republican Liberty Caucus
Nels Pierson

State legislators

- Greg Davids, state representative for the 28B district (2013–present), the 31B district (1993–2013), and the 32B district (1991–1993)
- Carla Nelson, state senator for the 26th district (2013–present) and the 30th district (2011–2013)
- David Senjem, state senator for the 25th district (2013–present) and the 29th district (2003–2013); Majority Leader of the Minnesota Senate (2011–2013); Minority Leader of the Minnesota Senate (2007–2011)

=== Polling ===
Poll source	Date(s) administered	Sample size (Note: Key: A – all adults RV – registered voters LV – likely voters V – unclear)	Margin of error	Jennifer Carnahan	Brad Finstad	Jeremy Munson	Other	Undecided
National Journal Hotline (Note: Poll sponsored by Carnahan's campaign)	April 13–14, 2022	287 (LV)	± 5.7%	37%	9%	20%	14%	20%

=== Results ===
Results by county: Finstad—70–80% Finstad—50–60% Finstad—40–50% Finstad—<40% Munson—40–50% Munson—50–60% Munson—60–70% Benda—40–50%

Republican primary results
Party	Candidate	Votes	%
Republican	Brad Finstad	13,695	38.12
Republican	Jeremy Munson	13,268	36.93
Republican	Jennifer Carnahan	2,887	8.04
Republican	Matt Benda	2,629	7.32
Republican	Nels Pierson	1,878	5.22
Republican	Kevin Kocina	960	2.67
Republican	Bob Carney Jr.	193	0.54
Republican	Roger Ungemach	151	0.42
Republican	J. R. Ewing	142	0.40
Republican	Ken Navitsky	127	0.35
Total votes		35,930	100.00

== Democratic–Farmer–Labor primary ==
=== Candidates ===
==== Nominee ====
- Jeff Ettinger, corporate executive and former CEO of Hormel Foods

==== Eliminated in primary ====
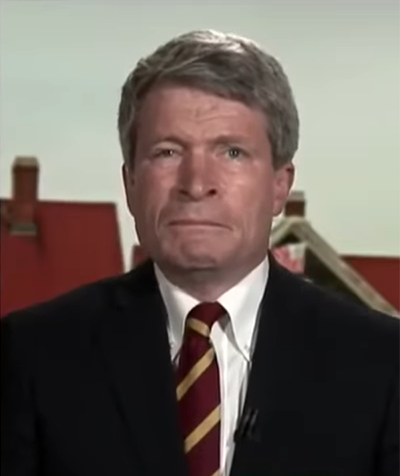
UMN Law School professor Richard Painter finished third in the primary.

- Warren Lee Anderson, retiree of retail
- Sarah Brakebill-Hacke, MPhil candidate at Cambridge University and former business owner in direct voter contact
- Candice Deal-Bartell, founder of Cultivate Mankato, founding board member of CultivateMN, and early childhood education advocate
- Richard DeVoe, Red Wing bookseller
- George H. Kalberer, CEO and president of Kalberer Financial Management and candidate for U.S. Senate in 2018 (Washington)
- Richard Painter, University of Minnesota Law School professor, former White House ethics lawyer under President George W. Bush, and candidate for U.S. Senate in 2018
- James Rainwater, attorney-mediator and arbitrator

==== Declined ====
- Dan Feehan, U.S. Army veteran, former U.S. Department of Defense official, nominee for this district in 2018 and 2020

=== Endorsements ===
Jeff Ettinger

State legislators

- Kathy Brynaert, former state representative for the 19B district (2013–2015) and the 23B district (2007–2013)
- Jack Considine, former state representative for the 19B district (2015–2021)
- Gene Pelowski, state representative for the 28A district (2013–present), the 31A district (2003–2013), the 32A district (1993–2003), and the 34B district (1987–1993)
- Jeanne Poppe, former state representative for the 27B district (2005–2021)
- Dan Sparks, former state senator for the 27th district (2003–2021)

Local officials

- Pat Baustian, mayor of Luverne (2010–present)
- Mike Kuhle, mayor of Worthington (2015–present)
- Tom Stiehm, former mayor of Austin (2007–2021)

Organizations

- Minnesota Democratic–Farmer–Labor Party
Richard Painter

U.S. representatives

- Jamie Raskin, U.S. representative from Maryland's 8th congressional district (2017–present)

=== Results ===
Results by county: Ettinger—>90% Ettinger—70–80% Ettinger—60–70% Ettinger—50–60% Ettinger—40–50%

Democratic (DFL) primary results
Party	Candidate	Votes	%
Democratic (DFL)	Jeff Ettinger	12,130	64.44
Democratic (DFL)	Sarah Brakebill-Hacke	2,492	13.24
Democratic (DFL)	Richard Painter	1,718	9.13
Democratic (DFL)	Candice Deal-Bartell	1,158	6.15
Democratic (DFL)	James Rainwater	446	2.37
Democratic (DFL)	Richard DeVoe	379	2.01
Democratic (DFL)	Warren Anderson	363	1.93
Democratic (DFL)	George Kalberer	137	0.73
Total votes		18,823	100.00

== Legal Marijuana Now primary ==
=== Candidate ===
==== Nominee ====
- Richard B. Reisdorf, veteran

=== Results ===
Legal Marijuana Now primary results
Party	Candidate	Votes	%
Legal Marijuana Now	Richard B. Reisdorf	363	100.00
Total votes		363	100.00

== Grassroots–Legalize Cannabis primary ==
=== Candidates ===
==== Nominee ====
- Haroun McClellan, attorney and contracts manager

=== Results ===
Grassroots–Legalize Cannabis primary results
Party	Candidate	Votes	%
Grassroots—LC	Haroun McClellan	194	100.00
Total votes		194	100.00

== General election ==
=== Predictions ===
Source	Ranking	As of
The Cook Political Report	Likely R	July 19, 2022
Inside Elections	Solid R	April 7, 2022
Sabato's Crystal Ball	Safe R	February 23, 2022

=== Post-primary endorsements ===
Brad Finstad (R)

Organizations

- Tea Party Express
Jeff Ettinger (DFL)

State officials

- Tim Walz, governor of Minnesota (2019–present) and former U.S. representative for Minnesota's 1st congressional district (2007–2019)

=== Polling ===
Poll source	Date(s) administered	Sample size	Margin of error	Brad Finstad (R)	Jeff Ettinger (DFL)	Other	Undecided
SurveyUSA	July 26–30, 2022	544 (LV)	± 4.7%	46%	38%	7%	8%
Expedition Strategies (D) (Note: This poll was sponsored by Ettinger's campaign)	June 6–9, 2022	400 (LV)	± 4.9%	48%	47%	–	5%

=== Results ===
2022 Minnesota's 1st congressional district special election
Party	Candidate	Votes	%	±%
Republican	Brad Finstad	59,788	50.71%	+2.12%
Democratic (DFL)	Jeff Ettinger	55,155	46.78%	+1.26%
Legal Marijuana Now	Richard Reisdorf	1,536	1.30%	N/A
Grassroots—LC	Haroun McClellan	865	0.73%	−5.08%
Write-in		548	0.46%	+0.40%
Total votes		117,892	100.0%	
Republican hold				

By county

County	Brad Finstad Republican		Jeff Ettinger DFL		Richard Reisdorf LMN		Haroun McClellan G–LC		Margin		Total votes
County	#	%	#	%	#	%	#	%	#	%	Total votes
Blue Earth	4,284	42.68	5,501	54.81	167	1.66	85	0.85	−1,217	−12.13	10,037
Brown	3,692	69.09	1,579	29.55	48	0.90	25	0.47	2,113	39.54	5,344
Cottonwood (part)	322	79.90	75	18.61	5	1.24	1	0.25	247	61.29	403
Dodge	2,011	62.88	1,138	35.58	27	0.84	22	0.69	873	27.30	3,198
Faribault	1,455	65.99	718	32.56	19	0.86	13	0.59	737	33.42	2,205
Fillmore	2,537	55.31	1,972	42.99	41	0.89	37	0.81	565	12.32	4,587
Freeborn	3,746	57.19	2,615	39.92	123	1.88	66	1.01	1,131	17.27	6,550
Houston	1,749	54.06	1,427	44.11	36	1.11	23	0.71	322	9.95	3,235
Jackson	1,117	69.38	466	28.94	21	1.30	6	0.37	651	40.43	1,610
Le Sueur	2,929	60.29	1,760	36.23	112	2.31	57	1.17	1,169	24.06	4,858
Martin	2,143	69.24	897	28.98	30	0.97	25	0.81	1,246	40.26	3,095
Mower	2,837	42.46	3,731	55.84	63	0.94	51	0.76	−894	−13.38	6,682
Nicollet	2,995	46.01	3,356	51.55	99	1.52	60	0.92	−361	−5.55	6,510
Nobles	1,377	70.04	547	27.82	25	1.27	17	0.86	830	42.22	1,966
Olmsted	13,550	40.53	19,287	57.70	389	1.16	203	0.61	−5,737	−17.16	33,429
Rice (part)	3,150	59.50	1,967	37.16	112	2.12	65	1.23	1,138	21.50	5,294
Rock	960	67.23	452	31.65	9	0.63	7	0.49	508	35.57	1,428
Steele	3,104	56.98	2,251	41.32	60	1.10	33	0.61	853	15.66	5,448
Waseca	1,771	62.89	995	35.33	35	1.24	15	0.53	776	27.56	2,816
Watonwan	1,255	66.51	602	31.90	19	1.01	11	0.58	653	34.61	1,887
Winona	3,308	44.30	4,005	53.64	109	1.46	45	0.60	−697	−9.33	7,467
Totals	60,292	51.07	55,341	46.88	1,549	1.31	867	0.73	4,951	4.19	118,049

== Notes ==
Partisan clients
