= Nels Pierson =

American politician

Member of the Minnesota House of Representatives from the 26B district
- In office January 6, 2015 – January 6, 2023
- Preceded by: Mike Benson
- Succeeded by: redrawn district

Personal details
- Born: December 29, 1972 (age 53)
- Party: Republican
- Spouse: Nicole
- Children: 5
- Education: Gustavus Adolphus College (BA); Hamline University (JD)

Nels Pierson (born December 29, 1972) is an American politician who served as a member of the Minnesota House of Representatives from 2015 to 2023. A member of the Republican Party of Minnesota, he represented the 26B district in southeastern Minnesota. The district includes a large part of the southern half of Rochester and greater Olmsted County to the south and east of the city. He was a candidate in the 2022 Minnesota's 1st congressional district special election.

== Early life and education ==
Pierson was raised in Butterfield, Minnesota. He earned a Bachelor of Arts degree from Gustavus Adolphus College and a Juris Doctor from the Hamline University School of Law.

== Career ==
Pierson was first elected to the Minnesota House of Representatives in 2014. He was a candidate in the 2022 Minnesota's 1st congressional district special election, losing to Brad Finstad in the May 24 primary.

== Political Positions ==
In December 2021, Pierson signed a letter along with 37 other Minnesota House Republicans in opposition of the Mayo Clinic for its vaccine mandate policy for employees, calling for a halt in state funding for health care facilities that fire employees "due to unrealistic vaccine mandate policies".

== Personal life ==
Pierson and his wife, Nicole, have five children.
