= Minnesota's 1st congressional district =

U.S. House district for Minnesota

Coordinates: 43°53′56″N 93°42′42″W

- Interactive map of district boundaries since January 3, 2023
- Representative: Brad Finstad; R–New Ulm
- Area: 13,322 mi^{2} (34,500 km^{2})
- Distribution: 62.53% urban; 37.47% rural
- Population (2025): 721,295
- Median household income: $81,453
- Ethnicity: 82.4% White; 7.2% Hispanic; 3.8% Black; 3.1% Two or more races; 2.8% Asian; 0.6% other
- Cook PVI: R+6

Minnesota's 1st congressional district spans southern Minnesota from the border with South Dakota to the border with Wisconsin. It is a primarily rural district built on a strong history of agriculture, though this is changing rapidly due to population growth in the Rochester combined statistical area. The district also includes several of Minnesota's major mid-sized cities, such as Rochester, Mankato, Winona, Austin, Owatonna, Albert Lea, Red Wing, New Ulm, Worthington, and Lake City. It is currently represented by Republican Brad Finstad.

From the state's early years until after the 2000 census, the district encompassed only southeastern Minnesota. Throughout the 20th century, it was generally regarded as solidly Republican, but it became more of a swing district in the late 20th and early 21st centuries. In 2004, John Kerry received 47% of the vote in the district. In 2006, Republican Representative Gil Gutknecht lost to Democrat Tim Walz. In March 2017, Walz announced that he would not run for reelection to Congress and would instead run for governor of Minnesota. On paper, the district leans Republican, with a CPVI of R+6, but some recent elections have been among the closest in the nation, with victories by less than a single percentage point in both 2016 and 2018. In the 2022 and 2024 general elections, Republican Brad Finstad defeated the Democratic nominee by 11.5 points and 17.1 points, respectively. Both margins of victory were the largest of any candidate's in the district since 2012 and the best showing for a Republican since 2004.

== Recent election results from statewide races ==
Year	Office	Results
1993–2003 boundaries
1992	President	Clinton 39% - 35% - 27%
1996	President	Clinton 48% - 37% - 15%
2000	President	Bush 48% - 46%
2003–2013 boundaries
2000	President	Bush 49% - 45%
2004	President	Bush 51% - 47%
2008	President	Obama 51% - 46%
2008	Senate	Coleman 43% - 39%
2010	Governor	Emmer 45% - 40%
2010	Secretary of State	Severson 48% - 45%
2010	Auditor	Anderson 52% - 43%
2010	Attorney General	Swanson 49% - 43%
2013–2023 boundaries
2008	President	Obama 51% - 47%
2012	President	Obama 50% - 48%
2012	Senate	Klobuchar 63% - 32%
2014	Senate	Franken 50% - 45%
2014	Governor	Johnson 48% - 46%
2014	Secretary of State	Severson 50% - 42%
2014	Auditor	Otto 45.3% - 44.8%
2014	Attorney General	Swanson 48% - 43%
2016	President	Trump 52% - 39%
2018	Senate (Reg.)	Klobuchar 54% - 42%
2018	Senate (Spec.)	Housley 48% - 47%
2018	Governor	Walz 50% - 47%
2018	Secretary of State	Howe 50% - 45%
2018	Auditor	Myhra 50% - 43%
2018	Attorney General	Wardlow 52% - 42%
2020	President	Trump 53% - 44%
2020	Senate	Lewis 50% - 42%
2023–2033 boundaries
2020	President	Trump 54% - 44%
2022	Governor	Jensen 52% - 45%
2022	Secretary of State	Crockett 54% - 46%
2022	Auditor	Wilson 55% - 40%
2022	Attorney General	Schultz 57% - 43%
2024	President	Trump 55% - 43%
2024	Senate	Klobuchar 49% - 48%
2026	Senate	Tafoya 51% - 46%
2026	Governor	Demuth 51% - 47%
2026	Secretary of State	Jude 49% - 47%
2026	Auditor	Jensen 52% - 45%
2026	Attorney General	Schutz 53% - 47%

== Composition ==
For the 118th and successive Congresses (based on redistricting following the 2020 census), the district contains all or portions of the following counties, townships, and municipalities:

Blue Earth County (36)

All 36 townships and municipalities

Brown County (16)

Albin Township, Cottonwood Township, Eden Township, Essig, Evan, Hanska, Home Township, Lake Hanska Township, Linden Township, Milford Township, New Ulm, Prairieville Township (part; also 7th), Sigel Township, Searles, Sleepy Eye, Stark Township

Dodge County (19)

All 19 townships and municipalities

Fairbault County (31)

All 31 townships and municipalities

Fillmore County (37)

All 37 townships and municipalities

Freeborn County (34)

All 34 townships and municipalities

Goodhue County (31)

All 31 townships and municipalities

Houston County (24)

All 24 townships and municipalities

Jackson County (26)

All 26 townships and municipalities

Martin County (31)

All 31 townships and municipalities

Mower County (34)

All 34 townships and municipalities

Nicollet County (20)

All 20 townships and municipalities

Nobles County (31)

All 31 townships and municipalities

Olmsted County (26)

All 26 townships and municipalities

Rice County (9)

Cannon City Township, Faribault, Nerstrand, Northfield Township (part; also 2nd), Richland Township, Walcott Township, Warsaw Township, Wells Township, Wheeling Township

Rock County (20)

All 20 townships and municipalities

Steele County (17)

All 17 townships and municipalities

Wabasha County (28)

All 28 townships and municipalities

Watonwan County (20)

All 20 townships and municipalities

Winona County (32)

All 32 townships and municipalities

== List of members representing the district ==
Member	Party	Years	Cong ress	Electoral history	District location
District established March 4, 1863
William Windom (Winona)	Republican	March 4, 1863 – March 3, 1869	38th 39th 40th	Redistricted from the at-large district and re-elected in 1862. Re-elected in 1864. Re-elected in 1866. Retired.	1863–1873 [data missing]
Morton S. Wilkinson (Mankato)	Republican	March 4, 1869 – March 3, 1871	41st	Elected in 1868. Lost renomination.	1863–1873 [data missing]
Mark H. Dunnell (Owatonna)	Republican	March 4, 1871 – March 3, 1883	42nd 43rd 44th 45th 46th 47th	Elected in 1870. Re-elected in 1872. Re-elected in 1874. Re-elected in 1876. Re-elected in 1878. Re-elected in 1880. Retired to run for U.S. Senator.	1863–1873 [data missing]
Mark H. Dunnell (Owatonna)	Republican	March 4, 1871 – March 3, 1883	42nd 43rd 44th 45th 46th 47th	Elected in 1870. Re-elected in 1872. Re-elected in 1874. Re-elected in 1876. Re-elected in 1878. Re-elected in 1880. Retired to run for U.S. Senator.	1873–1883; Blue Earth, Cottonwood, Dodge, Faribault, Fillmore, Freeborn, Houston, Jackson, Martin, Mower, Murray, Nobles, Olmsted, Pipestone, Rock, Steele, Waseca, Watonwan, and Winona
Milo White (Chatfield)	Republican	March 4, 1883 – March 3, 1887	48th 49th	Elected in 1882. Re-elected in 1884. Retired.	1883–1893; Dodge, Fillmore, Freeborn, Houston, Mower, Olmsted, Steele, Wabasha, and Winona
Thomas Wilson (Winona)	Democratic	March 4, 1887 – March 3, 1889	50th	Elected in 1886. Lost re-election.	1883–1893; Dodge, Fillmore, Freeborn, Houston, Mower, Olmsted, Steele, Wabasha, and Winona
Mark H. Dunnell (Owatonna)	Republican	March 4, 1889 – March 3, 1891	51st	Elected in 1888. Lost re-election.	1883–1893; Dodge, Fillmore, Freeborn, Houston, Mower, Olmsted, Steele, Wabasha, and Winona
William H. Harries (Caledonia)	Democratic	March 4, 1891 – March 3, 1893	52nd	Elected in 1890. Lost re-election.	1883–1893; Dodge, Fillmore, Freeborn, Houston, Mower, Olmsted, Steele, Wabasha, and Winona
James A. Tawney (Winona)	Republican	March 4, 1893 – March 3, 1911	53rd 54th 55th 56th 57th 58th 59th 60th 61st	Elected in 1892. Re-elected in 1894. Re-elected in 1896. Re-elected in 1898. Re-elected in 1900. Re-elected in 1902. Re-elected in 1904. Re-elected in 1906. Re-elected in 1908. Lost renomination.	1893–1933; Dodge, Fillmore, Freeborn, Houston, Mower, Olmsted, Steele, Wabasha, Waseca, and Winona
Sydney Anderson (Lanesboro)	Republican	March 4, 1911 – March 3, 1925	62nd 63rd 64th 65th 66th 67th 68th	Elected in 1910. Re-elected in 1912. Re-elected in 1914. Re-elected in 1916. Re-elected in 1918. Re-elected in 1920. Re-elected in 1922. Retired.	1893–1933; Dodge, Fillmore, Freeborn, Houston, Mower, Olmsted, Steele, Wabasha, Waseca, and Winona
Allen J. Furlow (Rochester)	Republican	March 4, 1925 – March 3, 1929	69th 70th	Elected in 1924. Re-elected in 1926. Lost renomination.	1893–1933; Dodge, Fillmore, Freeborn, Houston, Mower, Olmsted, Steele, Wabasha, Waseca, and Winona
Victor Christgau (Austin)	Republican	March 4, 1929 – March 3, 1933	71st 72nd	Elected in 1928. Re-elected in 1930. Redistricted to the at-large district and lost re-election as an independent.	1893–1933; Dodge, Fillmore, Freeborn, Houston, Mower, Olmsted, Steele, Wabasha, Waseca, and Winona
District inactive		March 4, 1933 – January 3, 1935	73rd	All members elected at-large.	
August H. Andresen (Red Wing)	Republican	January 3, 1935 – January 14, 1958	74th 75th 76th 77th 78th 79th 80th 81st 82nd 83rd 84th 85th	Elected in 1934. Re-elected in 1936. Re-elected in 1938. Re-elected in 1940. Re-elected in 1942. Re-elected in 1944. Re-elected in 1946. Re-elected in 1948. Re-elected in 1950. Re-elected in 1952. Re-elected in 1954. Re-elected in 1956. Died.	1935–1963; Dodge, Fillmore, Freeborn, Goodhue, Houston, Mower, Olmsted, Rice, Steele, Wabasha, Waseca, and Winona
Vacant		January 14, 1958 – February 18, 1958	85th		1935–1963; Dodge, Fillmore, Freeborn, Goodhue, Houston, Mower, Olmsted, Rice, Steele, Wabasha, Waseca, and Winona
Al Quie (Dennison)	Republican	February 18, 1958 – January 3, 1979	85th 86th 87th 88th 89th 90th 91st 92nd 93rd 94th 95th	Elected to finish Andresen's term. Re-elected in 1958. Re-elected in 1960. Re-elected in 1962. Re-elected in 1964. Re-elected in 1966. Re-elected in 1968. Re-elected in 1970. Re-elected in 1972. Re-elected in 1974. Re-elected in 1976. Retired to run for Governor of Minnesota.	1935–1963; Dodge, Fillmore, Freeborn, Goodhue, Houston, Mower, Olmsted, Rice, Steele, Wabasha, Waseca, and Winona
Al Quie (Dennison)	Republican	February 18, 1958 – January 3, 1979	85th 86th 87th 88th 89th 90th 91st 92nd 93rd 94th 95th	Elected to finish Andresen's term. Re-elected in 1958. Re-elected in 1960. Re-elected in 1962. Re-elected in 1964. Re-elected in 1966. Re-elected in 1968. Re-elected in 1970. Re-elected in 1972. Re-elected in 1974. Re-elected in 1976. Retired to run for Governor of Minnesota.	1963–1973; Dakota, Dodge, Fillmore, Freeborn, Goodhue, Houston, Mower, Olmsted, Rice, Steele, Wabasha, and Winona
Al Quie (Dennison)	Republican	February 18, 1958 – January 3, 1979	85th 86th 87th 88th 89th 90th 91st 92nd 93rd 94th 95th	Elected to finish Andresen's term. Re-elected in 1958. Re-elected in 1960. Re-elected in 1962. Re-elected in 1964. Re-elected in 1966. Re-elected in 1968. Re-elected in 1970. Re-elected in 1972. Re-elected in 1974. Re-elected in 1976. Retired to run for Governor of Minnesota.	1973–1983; Dodge, Fillmore, Goodhue, Houston, Olmsted, Rice, Steele, Wabasha, Washington, and Winona; parts of Dakota
Arlen Erdahl (West St. Paul)	Republican	January 3, 1979 – January 3, 1983	96th 97th	Elected in 1978. Re-elected in 1980. Lost renomination.	1973–1983; Dodge, Fillmore, Goodhue, Houston, Olmsted, Rice, Steele, Wabasha, Washington, and Winona; parts of Dakota
Tim Penny (New Richland)	Democratic (DFL)	January 3, 1983 – January 3, 1995	98th 99th 100th 101st 102nd 103rd	Elected in 1982. Re-elected in 1984. Re-elected in 1986. Re-elected in 1988. Re-elected in 1990. Re-elected in 1992. Retired.	1983–1993; Blue Earth, Dodge, Fillmore, Freeborn, Houston, Mower, Olmsted, Rice, Steele, Wabasha, Waseca, and Winona; parts of Dakota, Goodhue, Le Sueur, and Scott
Tim Penny (New Richland)	Democratic (DFL)	January 3, 1983 – January 3, 1995	98th 99th 100th 101st 102nd 103rd	Elected in 1982. Re-elected in 1984. Re-elected in 1986. Re-elected in 1988. Re-elected in 1990. Re-elected in 1992. Retired.	1993–1995; Blue Earth, Dodge, Faribault, Fillmore, Freeborn, Goodhue, Houston, Le Sueur, Mower, Olmsted, Rice, Steele, Wabasha, Waseca, and Winona; parts of Dakota and Scott
Gil Gutknecht (Rochester)	Republican	January 3, 1995 – January 3, 2007	104th 105th 106th 107th 108th 109th	Elected in 1994. Re-elected in 1996. Re-elected in 1998. Re-elected in 2000. Re-elected in 2002. Re-elected in 2004. Lost re-election.	1995–2003; Blue Earth, Dodge, Faribault, Fillmore, Freeborn, Goodhue, Houston, Mower, Olmsted, Rice, Steele, Wabasha, Waseca, and Winona; parts of Dakota, Le Sueur, Nicollet, and Scott
Gil Gutknecht (Rochester)	Republican	January 3, 1995 – January 3, 2007	104th 105th 106th 107th 108th 109th	Elected in 1994. Re-elected in 1996. Re-elected in 1998. Re-elected in 2000. Re-elected in 2002. Re-elected in 2004. Lost re-election.	2003–2013 Blue Earth, Brown, Cottonwood, Dodge, Faribault, Fillmore, Freeborn, Houston, Jackson, Martin, Mower, Murray, Nicollet, Nobles, Olmsted, Pipestone, Rock, Steele, Wabasha, Waseca, Watonwan, and Winona; parts of Le Sueur
Tim Walz (Mankato)	Democratic (DFL)	January 3, 2007 – January 3, 2019	110th 111th 112th 113th 114th 115th	Elected in 2006. Re-elected in 2008. Re-elected in 2010. Re-elected in 2012. Re-elected in 2014. Re-elected in 2016. Retired to run for Governor of Minnesota.	2003–2013 Blue Earth, Brown, Cottonwood, Dodge, Faribault, Fillmore, Freeborn, Houston, Jackson, Martin, Mower, Murray, Nicollet, Nobles, Olmsted, Pipestone, Rock, Steele, Wabasha, Waseca, Watonwan, and Winona; parts of Le Sueur
Tim Walz (Mankato)	Democratic (DFL)	January 3, 2007 – January 3, 2019	110th 111th 112th 113th 114th 115th	Elected in 2006. Re-elected in 2008. Re-elected in 2010. Re-elected in 2012. Re-elected in 2014. Re-elected in 2016. Retired to run for Governor of Minnesota.	2013–2023 Blue Earth, Brown, Dodge, Faribault, Fillmore, Freeborn, Houston, Jackson, Le Sueur, Martin, Mower, Nicollet, Nobles, Olmsted, Rock, Steele, Waseca, Watonwan, and Winona; parts of Cottonwood and Rice
Jim Hagedorn (Blue Earth)	Republican	January 3, 2019 – February 17, 2022	116th 117th	Elected in 2018. Re-elected in 2020. Died.	2013–2023 Blue Earth, Brown, Dodge, Faribault, Fillmore, Freeborn, Houston, Jackson, Le Sueur, Martin, Mower, Nicollet, Nobles, Olmsted, Rock, Steele, Waseca, Watonwan, and Winona; parts of Cottonwood and Rice
Vacant		February 17, 2022 – August 12, 2022	117th		2013–2023 Blue Earth, Brown, Dodge, Faribault, Fillmore, Freeborn, Houston, Jackson, Le Sueur, Martin, Mower, Nicollet, Nobles, Olmsted, Rock, Steele, Waseca, Watonwan, and Winona; parts of Cottonwood and Rice
Brad Finstad (New Ulm)	Republican	August 12, 2022 – present	117th 118th 119th	Elected to finish Hagedorn's term. Re-elected in 2022. Re-elected in 2024. Lost re-election.	2013–2023 Blue Earth, Brown, Dodge, Faribault, Fillmore, Freeborn, Houston, Jackson, Le Sueur, Martin, Mower, Nicollet, Nobles, Olmsted, Rock, Steele, Waseca, Watonwan, and Winona; parts of Cottonwood and Rice
Brad Finstad (New Ulm)	Republican	August 12, 2022 – present	117th 118th 119th	Elected to finish Hagedorn's term. Re-elected in 2022. Re-elected in 2024. Lost re-election.	2023–present Blue Earth, Dodge, Faribault, Fillmore, Freeborn, Goodhue, Houston, Jackson, Martin, Mower, Nicollet, Nobles, Olmsted, Rock, Steele, Wabasha, Waseca, Watonwan, and Winona; parts of Brown and Rice
Jake Johnson (Stewartville)	Democratic (DFL)	Elect, takes office January 3, 2027		Elected in 2026.	2023–present Blue Earth, Dodge, Faribault, Fillmore, Freeborn, Goodhue, Houston, Jackson, Martin, Mower, Nicollet, Nobles, Olmsted, Rock, Steele, Wabasha, Waseca, Watonwan, and Winona; parts of Brown and Rice

== Recent election results ==
Graph of election results in Minnesota's 1st congressional district

=== 2002–2012 ===
2002 United States House of Representatives elections in Minnesota, district 1
Party	Candidate	Votes	%
Republican	Gil Gutknecht (incumbent)	163,570	61.5
Democratic (DFL)	Steve Andreasen	92,165	34.7
Green	Gregory Mikkelson	9,964	3.7
Write-in		283	0.1
Total votes		265,982	100.0
Republican win (new boundaries)			

2004 United States House of Representatives elections in Minnesota, district 1
Party	Candidate	Votes	%	±%
Republican	Gil Gutknecht (incumbent)	193,132	59.6	–1.9
Democratic (DFL)	Leigh Pomeroy	115,088	35.5	+0.9
Independence	Gregory Mikkelson	15,569	4.8	N/a
Write-in		266	0.1	–0.0
Total votes		324,055	100.0	
Republican hold		Swing	–1.4	

2006 United States House of Representatives elections in Minnesota, district 1
Party	Candidate	Votes	%	±%
Democratic (DFL)	Tim Walz	141,556	52.7	+17.2
Republican	Gil Gutknecht (Incumbent)	126,486	47.1	–12.5
Write-in		379	0.1	+0.1
Total votes		268,421	100.0	
Democratic (DFL) gain from Republican		Swing	+14.8	

2008 United States House of Representatives elections in Minnesota, district 1
Party	Candidate	Votes	%	±%
Democratic (DFL)	Tim Walz (incumbent)	207,748	62.5	+9.8
Republican	Brian Davis	109,446	32.9	–14.2
Independence	Gregory Mikkelson	14,903	4.5	N/a
Write-in		290	0.1	–0.1
Total votes		332,387	100.0	
Democratic (DFL) hold		Swing	+12.0	

2010 United States House of Representatives elections in Minnesota, district 1
Party	Candidate	Votes	%	±%
Democratic (DFL)	Tim Walz (incumbent)	122,390	49.3	−13.2
Republican	Randy Demmer	109,261	44.0	+11.2
Independence	Steven Wilson	13,243	5.3	+0.9
Party Free	Lars Johnson	3,054	1.2	N/a
Write-in		102	0.0	–0.0
Total votes		248,050	100.0	
Democratic (DFL) hold		Swing	–12.1	

=== 2012–2022 ===
2012 United States House of Representatives elections in Minnesota, district 1
Party	Candidate	Votes	%
Democratic (DFL)	Tim Walz (incumbent)	193,211	57.5
Republican	Allen Quist	142,164	42.3
Write-in		505	0.2
Total votes		335,880	100.0
Democratic (DFL) win (new boundaries)			

2014 United States House of Representatives elections in Minnesota, district 1
Party	Candidate	Votes	%	±%
Democratic (DFL)	Tim Walz (incumbent)	122,851	54.2	−3.3
Republican	Jim Hagedorn	103,536	45.7	+3.3
Write-in		308	0.1	–0.0
Total votes		226,695	100.0	
Democratic (DFL) hold		Swing	–3.3	

2016 United States House of Representatives elections in Minnesota, district 1
Party	Candidate	Votes	%	±%
Democratic (DFL)	Tim Walz (incumbent)	169,074	50.3	−3.9
Republican	Jim Hagedorn	166,526	49.6	+3.9
Write-in		277	0.1	–0.1
Total votes		335,877	100.0	
Democratic (DFL) hold		Swing	−3.9	

2018 United States House of Representatives elections in Minnesota, district 1
Party	Candidate	Votes	%	±%
Republican	Jim Hagedorn	146,199	50.1	+0.5
Democratic (DFL)	Dan Feehan	144,884	49.7	−0.7
Write-in		575	0.2	+0.1
Total votes		291,658	100.0	
Republican gain from Democratic (DFL)		Swing	+0.6	

2020 United States House of Representatives elections in Minnesota, district 1
Party	Candidate	Votes	%	±%
Republican	Jim Hagedorn (incumbent)	179,234	48.6	−1.5
Democratic (DFL)	Dan Feehan	167,890	45.5	−4.2
Grassroots—LC	Bill Rood	21,448	5.8	N/a
Write-in		284	0.1	–0.1
Total votes		368,856	100.0	
Republican hold		Swing	+1.3	

2022 Minnesota's 1st congressional district special election
Party	Candidate	Votes	%	±%
Republican	Brad Finstad	59,788	50.7	+2.1
Democratic (DFL)	Jeff Ettinger	55,155	46.8	+1.3
Legal Marijuana Now	Richard Reisdorf	1,536	1.3	N/a
Grassroots—LC	Haroun McClellan	865	0.7	−5.1
Write-in		535	0.5	+0.4
Total votes		117,892	100.0	
Republican hold		Swing	+0.4	

=== 2022–present ===
2022 United States House of Representatives elections in Minnesota, district 1
Party	Candidate	Votes	%
Republican	Brad Finstad (incumbent)	159,621	53.8
Democratic (DFL)	Jeff Ettinger	125,457	42.3
Legal Marijuana Now	Richard Reisdorf	6,389	2.2
Grassroots—LC	Brian Abrahamson	4,943	1.7
Write-in		137	0.0
Total votes		296,547	100.0
Republican win (new boundaries)			

2024 United States House of Representatives elections in Minnesota, district 1
Party	Candidate	Votes	%	±%
Republican	Brad Finstad (incumbent)	220,934	58.5	+4.7
Democratic (DFL)	Rachel Bohman	156,375	41.4	–0.9
Write-in		297	0.1	+0.0
Total votes		377,606	100.0	
Republican hold		Swing	+2.8	

2026 United States House of Representatives elections in Minnesota, district 1
Party	Candidate	Votes	%
Democratic (DFL)	Jake Johnson	163,055	50.0
Republican	Brad Finstad (incumbent)	162,733	49.9
Write-in		391	0.1
Total votes		326,180	100.0
Democratic (DFL) gain from Republican			

== See also ==
- List of United States congressional districts
- Minnesota's congressional districts
