= Paul Torkelson =

American politician

Member of the Minnesota House of Representatives from the 15B district 21B (2009–2012), 16B (2013-2022)
- Incumbent
- Assumed office January 6, 2009
- Preceded by: Brad Finstad
- Succeeded by: Geri Theis (elect)

Personal details
- Born: July 12, 1952 (age 74)
- Party: Republican
- Spouse: Cindy
- Children: 2
- Education: Gustavus Adolphus College (BA)

Paul M. Torkelson (/ˈtɔːrkəlsən/ TOR-kəl-sən; born July 12, 1952) is an American politician serving as a member of the Minnesota House of Representatives since 2009. A member of the Republican Party of Minnesota, Torkelson represents District 15B in southwestern Minnesota, which includes the city of New Ulm and all or parts of Blue Earth, Brown, and Redwood Counties.

== Early life, education and career ==
Torkelson earned a Bachelor of Arts degree in instrumental music education from Gustavus Adolphus College in 1974.

In 2006, Governor Tim Pawlenty appointed Torkelson to the Minnesota Governor's Clean Water Council, a position he held until his election to the House. He is a member of the Minnesota's Deer Hunters Association, a former vice president of the Minnesota Farm Bureau, and a former chair of St. James Health Services.

Torkelson is a fourth-generation Watonwan County corn, soybean and pork farmer, with family roots in the area since 1878, and a former music teacher. He is a Lutheran.

== Minnesota House of Representatives ==
Torkelson was elected to the Minnesota House of Representatives in 2008, succeeding incumbent Representative Brad Finstad, who decided not to seek reelection, and has been reelected every two years since.

Torkelson was an assistant majority leader during the 2011-12 legislative session and an assistant minority leader from 2013-14. He chaired the Capital Investment Committee in 2015-16, and the Transportation Finance Committee in 2017-18. During the 2021-22 legislative session, Torkelson again served as an assistant majority leader. After the 2022 election, he was appointed to serve as deputy minority leader by incoming Minority Leader Lisa Demuth. After the 2024 election, he was appointed Assistant Republican Floor Leader. Torkelson also co-chairs the Ways and Means Committee.

On January 30, 2026, Torkelson announced he was not running for reelection in 2026.

== Electoral history ==
2008 Minnesota State House - District 21B
Party	Candidate	Votes	%
Republican	Paul Torkelson	9,111	51.43
Democratic (DFL)	Robert Skillings	8,586	48.47
Write-in		17	0.10
Total votes		17,714	100.0
Republican hold			

2010 Minnesota State House - District 21B
Party	Candidate	Votes	%
Republican	Paul Torkelson	11,774	98.31
Write-in		203	1.69
Total votes		11,977	100.0
Republican hold			

2012 Minnesota State House - District 16B
Party	Candidate	Votes	%
Republican	Paul Torkelson	11,243	56.14
Democratic (DFL)	James Kanne	6,466	32.29
Independent	Jerry "Pike" Pagel	2,303	11.50
Write-in		13	0.06
Total votes		20,025	100.0
Republican hold			

2014 Minnesota State House - District 16B
Party	Candidate	Votes	%
Republican	Paul Torkelson	9,053	64.94
Democratic (DFL)	James Kanne	4,872	34.95
Write-in		16	0.11
Total votes		13,941	100.0
Republican hold			

2016 Minnesota State House - District 16B
Party	Candidate	Votes	%
Republican	Paul Torkelson	14,529	73.06
Democratic (DFL)	Austin Grossenburg	5,333	26.82
Write-in		25	0.11
Total votes		19,887	100.0
Republican hold			

2018 Minnesota State House - District 16B
Party	Candidate	Votes	%
Republican	Paul Torkelson	10,772	63.20
Democratic (DFL)	Marinda "Mindy" Kimmel	6,268	36.77
Write-in		5	0.03
Total votes		17,045	100.0
Republican hold			

2020 Minnesota State House - District 16B
Party	Candidate	Votes	%
Republican	Paul Torkelson	14,476	67.61
Democratic (DFL)	Marinda "Mindy" Kimmel	6,908	32.26
Write-in		28	0.13
Total votes		21,412	100.0
Republican hold			

2022 Minnesota State House - District 15B
Party	Candidate	Votes	%
Republican	Paul Torkelson	13,444	72.39
Democratic (DFL)	Tom Kuster	5,075	27.39
Write-in		10	0.05
Total votes		18,529	100.0
Republican hold			

2024 Minnesota State House - District 15B
Party	Candidate	Votes	%
Republican	Paul Torkelson	16,814	72.65
Democratic (DFL)	Tom Kuster	6,315	27.29
Write-in		14	0.06
Total votes		23,143	100.0
Republican hold			
