= Jeff Ettinger =

American CEO and attorney

President of the University of Minnesota
- Acting
- In office June 10, 2023 – July 1, 2024
- Preceded by: Joan Gabel
- Succeeded by: Rebecca Cunningham

Personal details
- Born: Jeffrey Martin Ettinger; October 18, 1958 (age 67) Pasadena, California, U.S.
- Party: Democratic
- Spouse: LeeAnn
- Children: 4
- Education: University of California, Los Angeles (BA, JD)

Jeffrey Martin Ettinger (born October 18, 1958) is an American corporate executive, businessman, philanthropist, politician, and attorney who served as the interim president of the University of Minnesota from 2023 to 2024.

He was previously CEO, and currently interim CEO, of Hormel Foods. As Hormel's CEO from 2005 until 2016, he led the company through a period of major growth in market value. Ettinger now runs the corporate Hormel Foundation, which gives millions of dollars to charitable causes in Austin, Minnesota, and serves on the boards of several other companies.

== Early life and education ==
Ettinger was born in Pasadena, California. He earned a Bachelor of Arts degree and Juris Doctor from the University of California, Los Angeles.

== Career ==
Ettinger served as a law clerk to Judge Arthur Alarcón of the United States Court of Appeals for the Ninth Circuit. He has worked at Hormel since 1989, fulfilling roles such as senior corporate attorney (1989–1993), treasurer (1998–1999), and president of Jennie-O (1999–2003). He later worked as vice president and general counsel of Comar Marketing. He was a member of the American Meat Institute board of directors, the Grocery Manufacturers Association board of directors, and the Minnesota Business Partnership board of directors. He became Hormel's president, CEO, and chairman of the board in 2005 and retired as CEO on October 30, 2016. He continued to serve as chairman of the board until retiring on November 20, 2017.

Ettinger was the Democratic nominee for the 2022 Minnesota's 1st congressional district special election and for the regular election in November 2022. Ettinger lost both elections to Brad Finstad.

On May 8, 2023, Ettinger was selected as Interim President for the University of Minnesota system. On June 26, 2024, as Interim President for the University of Minnesota Ettinger received a vote of no confidence from the University of Minnesota Faculty Senate for his decision to rescind a job offer to Raz Segal for the position of director of the Center for Holocaust and Genocide Studies. In 2026, the university settled with Segal for $250,000.

In June 2025, Ettinger was named interim CEO of Hormel Foods through October 2026.

== Personal life ==
Ettinger and his wife, LeeAnn, have four children. They live in Austin, Minnesota.

Ettinger is Catholic.
