= Brad Finstad =

American politician (born 1976)

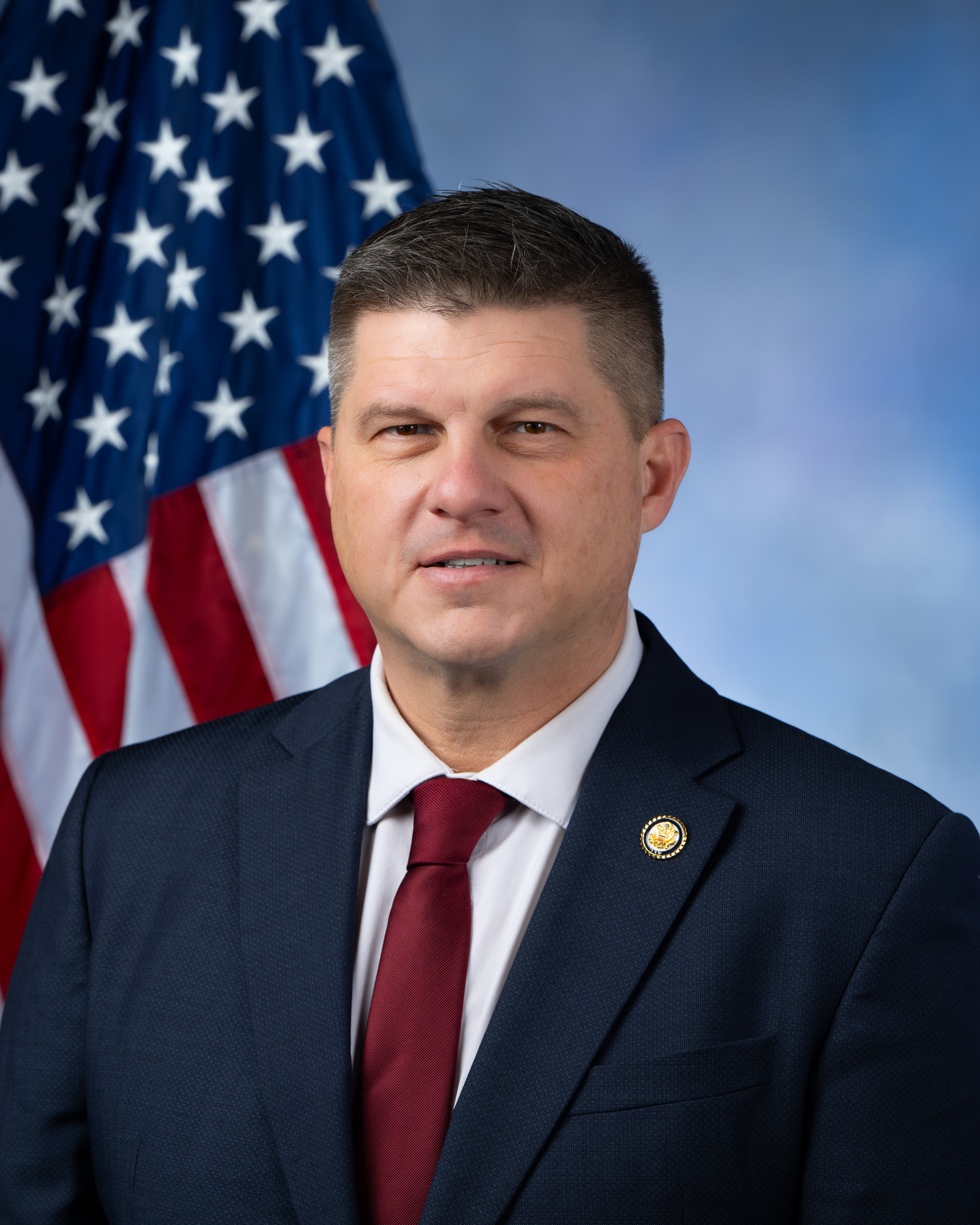
- Official portrait, 2025

Member of the U.S. House of Representatives from Minnesota's 1st district
- Incumbent
- Assumed office August 9, 2022 (Note: Finstad's official service begins on the date of the special election, while he was not sworn in until August 12, 2022.)
- Preceded by: Jim Hagedorn

Member of the Minnesota House of Representatives from the 21B district
- In office January 7, 2003 – January 5, 2009
- Preceded by: Richard Mulder
- Succeeded by: Paul Torkelson

Personal details
- Born: Bradley Howard Finstad; May 30, 1976 (age 50) New Ulm, Minnesota, U.S.
- Party: Republican
- Spouse: Jaclyn
- Children: 7
- Education: University of Minnesota (BS)
- Website: House website Campaign website

Bradley Howard Finstad (born May 30, 1976) is an American politician serving since 2022 as the U.S. representative for Minnesota's 1st congressional district. Finstad represents a section of southern Minnesota along the border with Iowa. A member of the Republican Party, he served in the Minnesota House of Representatives from 2003 to 2009.

Finstad previously served as an area director for the Minnesota Farm Bureau and as the agricultural policy advisor to U.S. representative Mark Kennedy. In 2002, he was elected to the Minnesota House of Representatives, where he served three terms. In 2017 President Donald Trump appointed Finstad as the USDA Rural Development director for Minnesota. He served until shortly after Trump left office in 2021. In addition to his government service, Finstad operates a family farm.

Finstad was elected to represent Minnesota's 1st congressional district in a 2022 special election, to finish the term of the late Jim Hagedorn.

== Early life and education ==
Finstad was born in New Ulm, Minnesota, on May 30, 1976. A fourth-generation resident of the area, he grew up on his family's farm in Brown County, Minnesota, which his family has operated for several generations. He earned a Bachelor of Science degree in agricultural education from the University of Minnesota.

== Early political career ==
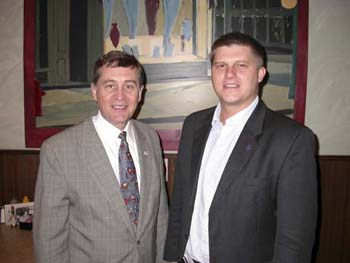
Finstad with Gil Gutknecht in 2004

After graduating from college, Finstad joined the human resources department of Christensen Family Farms in Brown County, Minnesota. He later briefly worked as an area director for the Minnesota Farm Bureau before joining the staff of Congressman Mark Kennedy, serving as an agricultural advisor.

Finstad was elected to the Minnesota House of Representatives in 2002 and took office in 2003. During his final term in the legislature, he served as assistant minority leader. He also served on the Rural Health Advisory Committee under Minnesota governor Tim Pawlenty. He left the House in 2009.

From 2008 to 2017, Finstad was CEO of the Center for Rural Policy and Development, a nonprofit policy research organization based in St. Peter, Minnesota. He also worked for an agricultural research and consulting company. In November 2017, President Donald Trump appointed Finstad as Minnesota state director of USDA Rural Development. Finstad left this position after Trump left office in 2021.

Finstad next joined the Minnesota Turkey Growers Association as interim executive director. He left this position in 2022.

== U.S. House of Representatives ==
=== Elections ===
==== 2022 special ====
After Congressman Jim Hagedorn died in office, Finstad announced his candidacy for the Republican nomination to serve the rest of Hagedorn's term in the 2022 Minnesota's 1st congressional district special election. In the May 24 special Republican primary election, Finstad defeated state representative Jeremy Munson and seven other candidates to win the nomination with 38.1% of the vote to Munson's 36.9%, Jennifer Carnahan's 8.0%, and Matt Benda's 7.2%, with several other candidates splitting the rest of the vote. Finstad won the August 2022 special election by around 4 points against Democratic-Farmer-Labor (DFL) nominee Jeff Ettinger, former CEO of Hormel and a first-time candidate.

==== 2022 ====
Winning a second primary against Munson, Finstad defeated Ettinger again in the November 8 general election, with 53.9% of the vote to Ettinger's 42.3%.

==== 2024 ====
Finstad was elected to a third term in the November 5 general election, defeating Rachel Bohman with 58.5% of the vote to Bohman's 41.4%.

=== Tenure ===
Finstad was sworn in by House Speaker Nancy Pelosi on August 12, 2022. Later that day he voted against the Inflation Reduction Act of 2022.

=== Caucus memberships ===
- Republican Main Street Partnership
- Congressional Western Caucus
- Republican Study Committee
- Congressional Biofuels Caucus

=== Committee assignments ===
For the 119th Congress:

- Committee on Agriculture
  - Subcommittee on Conservation, Research, and Biotechnology
  - Subcommittee on General Farm Commodities, Risk Management, and Credit
  - Subcommittee on Nutrition, Foreign Agriculture, and Horticulture (Chairman)
- Committee on Armed Services
  - Subcommittee on Military Personnel
  - Subcommittee on Readiness
- Committee on Small Business
  - Subcommittee on Oversight, Investigations, and Regulations
  - Subcommittee on Rural Development, Energy, and Supply Chains

== Political positions ==
=== Federal debt ceiling ===
Finstad was among the 71 House Republicans who voted against final passage of the Fiscal Responsibility Act of 2023.

=== Foreign policy ===
Finstad voted to provide Israel with support following the 2023 Hamas attack on Israel.

In February 2026, Finstad supported Trump's initial strikes in the 2026 Iran war. In June 2026, he voted against a war powers resolution intended to limit the Iran war.

=== One Big Beautiful Bill Act ===
In 2025, Finstad voted for the One Big Beautiful Bill Act.

=== Vote to defund vice president ===
On November 8, 2023, Finstad joined 100 other Republicans voting in favor of an amendment to a large appropriations bill that would prohibit funding for the Office of Vice President Kamala Harris.

== Personal life ==
Finstad is Catholic.

U.S. House of Representatives
Preceded by Jim Hagedorn	Member of the U.S. House of Representatives from Minnesota's 1st congressional district 2022–present	Incumbent
U.S. order of precedence (ceremonial)
Preceded by Mike Flood	United States representatives by seniority 287th	Succeeded by Pat Ryan
