= Minnesota State Highway 83 =

State highway in Minnesota, United States

Trunk Highway 83
- MN 83 highlighted in red

Route information
- Maintained by MnDOT
- Length: 23.760 mi (38.238 km)
- Existed: 1933–present

Major junctions
- South end: MN 30 near Waldorf
- North end: MN 22 at Mankato

Location
- Country: United States
- State: Minnesota
- Counties: Waseca, Blue Earth

Highway system
- Minnesota Trunk Highway System; Interstate; US; State; Legislative; Scenic
← MN 80	→ MN 84

Minnesota State Highway 83 (MN 83) is a 23.760-mile-long (38.238 km) highway in south-central Minnesota, which runs from its intersection with State Highway 30 near Waldorf and continues north to its northern terminus at its intersection with State Highway 22 in Mankato.

== Route description ==
State Highway 83 serves as a north–south route in south-central Minnesota between Waldorf, Pemberton, St. Clair, and Mankato.

The highway is legally defined as Legislative Route 201 in the Minnesota Statutes. It is not marked with this number.

== History ==
State Highway 83 was authorized in 1933 and completely paved by 1953.

At one time, Highway 83 had continued farther west. The section of present-day State Highway 68 between U.S. Highway 169 (at Mankato) and State Highway 15 (immediately south of New Ulm) was originally designated Highway 83 as well between 1934 and 1963. Highway 83 was originally marked as an east–west route by its highway shields from beginning to end.

== Major intersections ==
County	Location	mi	km	Destinations	Notes
Waseca	Vivian Township	0.000	0.000	MN 30 / CSAH 28 – New Richland	
Waseca	Waldorf	2.570	4.136	CSAH 3	
Blue Earth	Medo Township	10.773	17.337	CSAH 10 / CR 172	
Blue Earth	McPherson Township	13.306	21.414	CR 173 / CSAH 14	
Blue Earth	St. Clair	15.914	25.611	CSAH 15	
Blue Earth	McPherson Township	18.176	29.251	CSAH 90	
Blue Earth	Le Ray Township	20.398	32.827	CSAH 28 – Eagle Lake	
Blue Earth	Mankato Township	23.761	38.240	MN 22 / CSAH 60 – Mapleton, Mankato	
1.000 mi = 1.609 km; 1.000 km = 0.621 mi
