= Alma City, Minnesota =

Unincorporated community in Minnesota, US

Alma City
- Unincorporated community
- Location within Minnesota Location within the United States
- Coordinates: 44°01′21″N 93°43′41″W
- Country: United States
- State: Minnesota
- County: Waseca
- Township: Alton Township and Freedom Township
- Elevation: 1,063 ft (324 m)
- Time zone: UTC-6 (Central (CST))
  - Summer (DST): UTC-5 (CDT)
- ZIP code: 56048 and 56078
- Area code: 507
- GNIS feature ID: 639297

Alma City is an unincorporated community in Waseca County, Minnesota, United States, south of Janesville.

== Geography ==
The community is located along Waseca County Road 9 (320th Avenue) near County Road 54. Alma City is located within Alton Township and Freedom Township. Nearby places include Janesville, Pemberton, and Waldorf. County Road 3 is also in the immediate area. The Le Sueur River flows nearby.

== History ==
Alma City was platted in 1865, and named for Alma Hills, the daughter of an early settler. A post office was established at Alma City in 1870, and remained in operation until 1957.
