= Medo Township, Blue Earth County, Minnesota =

Township in Minnesota, United States

Medo Township
- Township
- Location within the state of Minnesota Medo Township (the United States)
- Coordinates: 43°58′52″N 93°49′6″W
- Country: United States
- State: Minnesota
- County: Blue Earth

Area
  - Total: 35.7 sq mi (92.5 km^{2})
  - Land: 35.0 sq mi (90.6 km^{2})
  - Water: 0.73 sq mi (1.9 km^{2})
- Elevation: 1,020 ft (310 m)

Population (2000)
  - Total: 374
  - Density: 11/sq mi (4.1/km^{2})
- Time zone: UTC-6 (Central (CST))
  - Summer (DST): UTC-5 (CDT)
- FIPS code: 27-41498
- GNIS feature ID: 0664950

Medo Township is a township in Blue Earth County, Minnesota, United States. The population was 374 as of the 2000 census.

== History ==
Medo Township was organized in 1863.

== Geography ==
According to the United States Census Bureau, the township has a total area of 35.7 square miles (92.5 km^{2}), of which 35.0 square miles (90.6 km^{2}) is land and 0.8 square miles (1.9 km^{2}) (2.10%) is water.

The city of Pemberton is entirely within this township geographically but is a separate entity.

=== Lakes ===
- Cottonwood Lake
- Perch Lake (east quarter)
- Severson Lake

=== Adjacent townships ===
- McPherson Township (north)
- Alton Township, Waseca County (northeast)
- Freedom Township, Waseca County (east)
- Vivian Township, Waseca County (southeast)
- Danville Township (south)
- Mapleton Township (southwest)
- Beauford Township (west)
- Decoria Township (northwest)

=== Cemeteries ===
The township includes the following cemeteries: Medo, Medo Center and Medo-McPherson.

== Demographics ==
As of the census of 2000, there were 374 people, 126 households, and 105 families residing in the township. The population density was 10.7 people per square mile (4.1/km^{2}). There were 131 housing units at an average density of 3.7/sq mi (1.4/km^{2}). The racial makeup of the township was 97.33% White, 1.60% from other races, and 1.07% from two or more races. Hispanic or Latino of any race were 2.41% of the population.

There were 126 households, out of which 36.5% had children under the age of 18 living with them, 76.2% were married couples living together, 4.8% had a female householder with no husband present, and 15.9% were non-families. 14.3% of all households were made up of individuals, and 8.7% had someone living alone who was 65 years of age or older. The average household size was 2.97 and the average family size was 3.27.

In the township the population was spread out, with 28.6% under the age of 18, 7.2% from 18 to 24, 26.5% from 25 to 44, 21.9% from 45 to 64, and 15.8% who were 65 years of age or older. The median age was 38 years. For every 100 females, there were 110.1 males. For every 100 females age 18 and over, there were 107.0 males.

The median income for a household in the township was $42,159, and the median income for a family was $41,111. Males had a median income of $29,643 versus $19,375 for females. The per capita income for the township was $16,418. About 11.2% of families and 10.8% of the population were below the poverty line, including 17.1% of those under age 18 and 5.6% of those age 65 or over.
