= Iosco Township =

Iosco Township may refer to:

- Iosco Township, Michigan
- Iosco Township, Waseca County, Minnesota
- Iosco Township, Stutsman County, North Dakota, in Stutsman County, North Dakota
