= Iosco =

Iosco or IOSCO may refer to:

== Organizations ==
- International Organization of Securities Commissions

== Places ==
- Iosco County, Michigan
- Iosco Township, Michigan
- Iosco Township, Minnesota
