= Smiths Mill, Minnesota =

Unincorporated community in Minnesota, US

Smiths Mill
- Unincorporated community
- Location within Minnesota Location within the United States
- Coordinates: 44°08′16″N 93°46′05″W
- Country: United States
- State: Minnesota
- County: Blue Earth and Waseca
- Township: Le Ray Township and Janesville Township
- Elevation: 1,063 ft (324 m)
- Time zone: UTC-6 (Central (CST))
  - Summer (DST): UTC-5 (CDT)
- ZIP code: 56048 and 56024
- Area code: 507
- GNIS feature ID: 652188

Smiths Mill is an unincorporated community in Blue Earth and Waseca counties in the U.S. state of Minnesota. The community is located along 631st Avenue near 206th Street and U.S. Highway 14. Smiths Mill is located within Le Ray Township in Blue Earth County; and also located within Janesville Township in Waseca County. Nearby places include Janesville and Eagle Lake.

== History ==
A post office called Smith's Mill was first established on May 4, 1876. The post office was discontinued in 1967 when the store closed. The community was named for Peter P. Smith, the owner of a mill.
