= St. Mary, Minnesota =

Unincorporated community in Minnesota, US

St. Mary
- Unincorporated community
- Location within Minnesota Location within the United States
- Coordinates: 44°01′42″N 93°36′07″W
- Country: United States
- State: Minnesota
- County: Waseca
- Township: St. Mary Township
- Elevation: 1,089 ft (332 m)
- Time zone: UTC-6 (Central (CST))
  - Summer (DST): UTC-5 (CDT)
- ZIP code: 56093
- Area code: 507
- GNIS feature ID: 654928

St. Mary is an unincorporated community in St. Mary Township, Waseca County, Minnesota, United States, near Waseca. The community is located near the junction of Waseca County Roads 9 and 29, and 320th Avenue. The Le Sueur River flows nearby.
