= Gilfillin Lake =

Lake in the state of Minnesota, United States

- Location within Minnesota Location within the United States
- Location: Blue Earth County, Minnesota
- Coordinates: 44°11′56″N 93°50′51″W
- Type: lake
- Basin countries: United States
- Surface elevation: 1,014 ft (309 m)

Gilfillin Lake is a lake in Blue Earth County, Minnesota, in the United States.

Gilfillin Lake was named for Joseph Gilfillin, an early settler who was killed in the Civil War.
