= Smith Mills =

Smith Mills or Smiths Mills may refer to:

- Smith Mills, Kentucky, an unincorporated community in Henderson County
- Smith Mills, Massachusetts, a CDP in Dartmouth, Bristol County
- Smiths Mill, Minnesota, an unincorporated community in Blue Earth and Waseca counties
- Smith Mills, New York, a hamlet of Hanover
