= Le Ray Township, Blue Earth County, Minnesota =

Township in Minnesota, United States

Le Ray Township
- Township
- Location within the state of Minnesota Le Ray Township (the United States)
- Coordinates: 44°9′28″N 93°49′26″W
- Country: United States
- State: Minnesota
- County: Blue Earth

Area
  - Total: 35.1 sq mi (90.8 km^{2})
  - Land: 32.5 sq mi (84.3 km^{2})
  - Water: 2.5 sq mi (6.5 km^{2})
- Elevation: 1,020 ft (310 m)

Population (2000)
  - Total: 846
  - Density: 26/sq mi (10/km^{2})
- Time zone: UTC-6 (Central (CST))
  - Summer (DST): UTC-5 (CDT)
- FIPS code: 27-36584
- GNIS feature ID: 0664760
- Website: https://leraytownshipmn.com/

Le Ray Township is a township in Blue Earth County, Minnesota, United States. The population was 846 as of the 2000 census.

== History ==
Le Ray Township was first settled in 1856 and was organized in 1860. At first it was named Lake Township, then was renamed Tivoli Township, but on September 5, 1860, it received its present name.

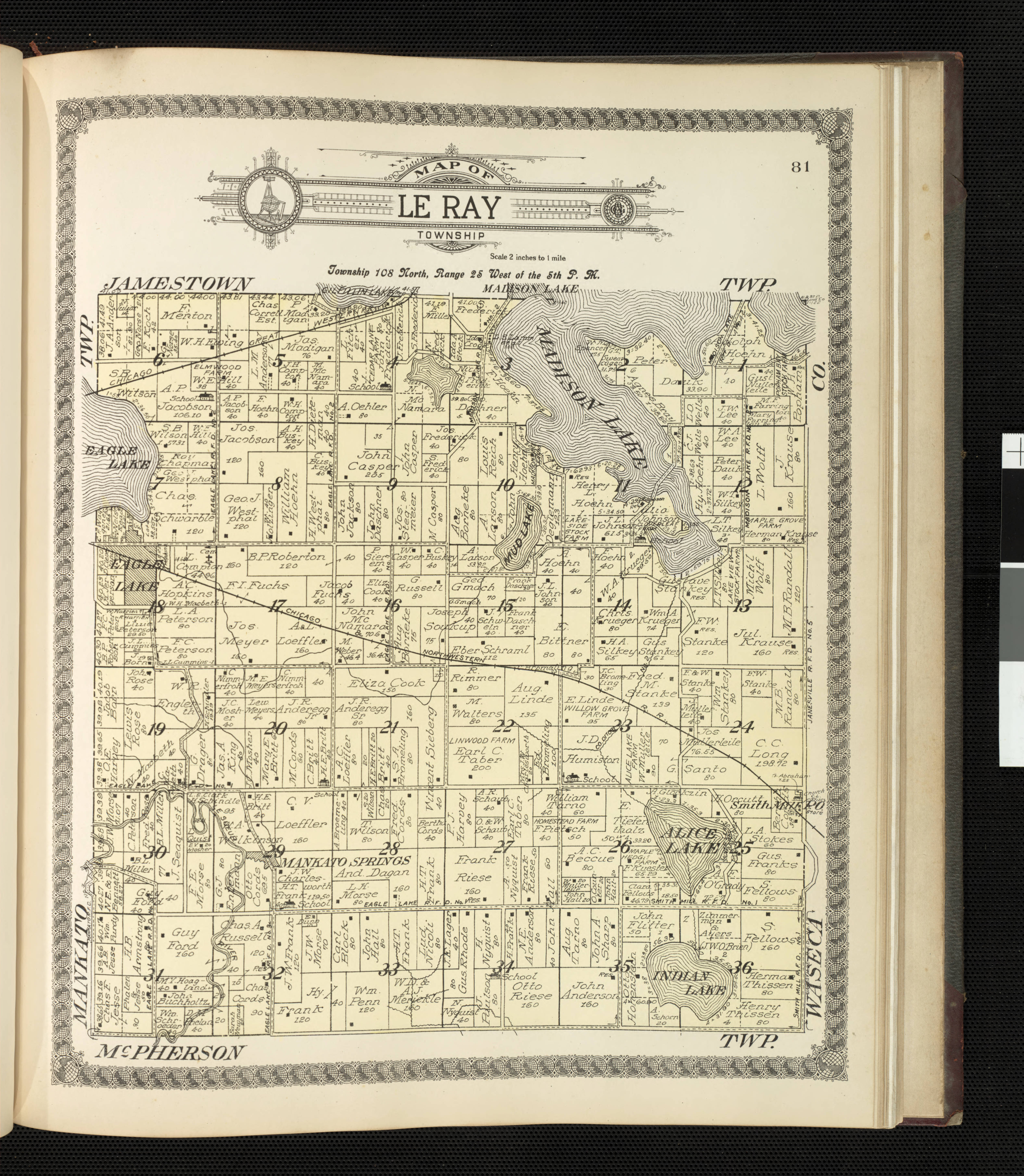
Le Ray Township Plat Map from the Standard Atlas, Blue Earth County, Minnesota

== Geography ==
According to the United States Census Bureau, the township has a total area of 35.1 square miles (91 km^{2}), of which 32.5 square miles (84 km^{2}) is land and 2.5 square miles (6.5 km^{2}) (7.19%) is water.

The east half of the city of Eagle Lake is within the township geographically but is a separate entity.

=== Major highways ===
- U.S. Highway 14
- Minnesota State Highway 60

=== Lakes ===
- Alice Lake
- Born Lake
- Eagle Lake (east half)
- Gilfillin Lake (south quarter)
- Indian Lake
- Madison Lake
- Madison Lake (southwest three-quarters)
- Mud Lake

=== Adjacent townships ===
- Jamestown Township (north)
- Elysian Township, Le Sueur County (northeast)
- Janesville Township, Waseca County (east)
- Alton Township, Waseca County (southeast)
- McPherson Township (south)
- Decoria Township (southwest)
- Mankato Township (west)
- Lime Township (northwest)

=== Cemeteries ===
The township includes Eagle Lake Cemetery.

== Demographics ==
As of the census of 2000, there were 846 people, 295 households, and 235 families residing in the township. The population density was 26.0 inhabitants per square mile (10.0/km^{2}). There were 335 housing units at an average density of 10.3/sq mi (4.0/km^{2}). The racial makeup of the township was 97.87% White, 1.06% Asian, 0.12% from other races, and 0.95% from two or more races. Hispanic or Latino of any race were 0.47% of the population.

There were 295 households, out of which 40.3% had children under the age of 18 living with them, 71.5% were married couples living together, 3.7% had a female householder with no husband present, and 20.3% were non-families. 14.9% of all households were made up of individuals, and 8.1% had someone living alone who was 65 years of age or older. The average household size was 2.87 and the average family size was 3.23.

In the township the population was spread out, with 28.1% under the age of 18, 9.1% from 18 to 24, 29.0% from 25 to 44, 23.2% from 45 to 64, and 10.6% who were 65 years of age or older. The median age was 38 years. For every 100 females, there were 102.4 males. For every 100 females age 18 and over, there were 106.1 males.

The median income for a household in the township was $52,188, and the median income for a family was $57,639. Males had a median income of $33,750 versus $24,417 for females. The per capita income for the township was $19,848. About 2.2% of families and 3.6% of the population were below the poverty line, including none of those under age 18 and 13.2% of those age 65 or over.
