= Eagle Lake (Blue Earth County, Minnesota) =

Lake in the state of Minnesota, United States

- Location within Minnesota
- Location: Blue Earth County, Minnesota
- Coordinates: 44.1896610°N 93.8964023°W
- Type: lake

Eagle Lake is a lake in Blue Earth County, Minnesota, in the United States. The city of Eagle Lake, Minnesota is located near this lake.

Eagle Lake was named from the many bald eagle nests seen by early surveyors near the lake.

== See also ==
- List of lakes in Minnesota
