= Palmer, Minnesota =

Unincorporated community in Minnesota, US

Palmer
- Unincorporated community
- Location within Minnesota Location within the United States
- Coordinates: 44°09′11″N 93°32′31″W
- Country: United States
- State: Minnesota
- County: Waseca
- Township: Iosco Township
- Elevation: 1,155 ft (352 m)
- Time zone: UTC-6 (Central (CST))
  - Summer (DST): UTC-5 (CDT)
- ZIP code: 56093
- Area code: 507
- GNIS feature ID: 654869

Palmer is an unincorporated community in Iosco Township, Waseca County, Minnesota, United States, near Waseca and Waterville. The community is located along Waseca County Road 22 (410th Avenue) near 110th Street.

Palmer was platted in 1915.
