= Blooming Grove Township =

Blooming Grove Township may refer to the following townships in the United States:

- Blooming Grove Township, Franklin County, Indiana
- Blooming Grove Township, Waseca County, Minnesota
- Blooming Grove Township, Ohio
- Blooming Grove Township, Pike County, Pennsylvania
