= Lieberg Lake =

Lake in the state of Minnesota, United States

- Location within Minnesota
- Location: Blue Earth County, Minnesota
- Coordinates: 44°9′12″N 94°18′46″W
- Type: lake

Lieberg Lake is a lake in Blue Earth County, Minnesota, in the United States.

Lieberg Lake was named for Ole P. Lieberg, an early settler.
