= Waseca County, Minnesota =

County in Minnesota, United States

- County
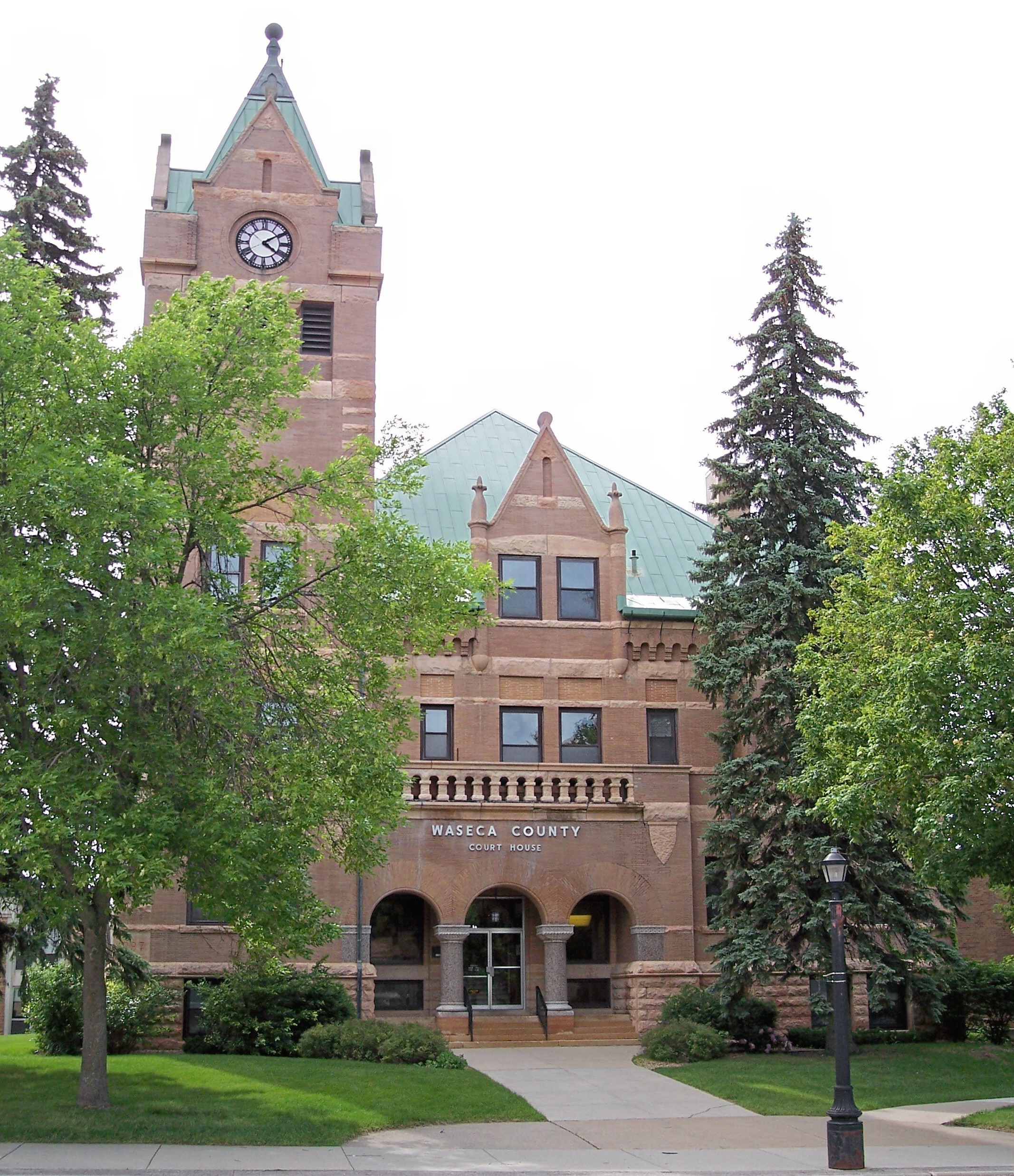
- Waseca County Courthouse in 2007

- Location within the U.S. state of Minnesota
- Coordinates: 44°01′N 93°35′W
- Country: United States
- State: Minnesota
- Founded: February 27, 1857
- Named for: Waseca (settlement)
- Seat: Waseca
- Largest city: Waseca

Area
  - Total: 433 sq mi (1,120 km^{2})
  - Land: 423 sq mi (1,100 km^{2})
  - Water: 9.6 sq mi (25 km^{2}) 2.2%

Population (2020)
  - Total: 18,968
  - Estimate (2025): 18,688 ▼
  - Density: 44.8/sq mi (17.3/km^{2})
- Time zone: UTC−6 (Central)
  - Summer (DST): UTC−5 (CDT)
- Congressional district: 1st
- Website: www.wasecacounty.gov

Waseca County (/wəˈsiːkə/) is a county in the U.S. state of Minnesota. As of the 2020 census, the population was 18,968. Its county seat is Waseca.

== History ==
In 1849, the newly organized Minnesota Territory legislature authorized nine counties across the territory. One of those, Dakota, was partially subdivided in 1853 to create Blue Earth, Le Sueur, and Rice counties. In 1855, parts of those counties were partitioned to create Steele. On February 27, 1857, the territorial legislature authorized partitioning western Steele County to create Waseca County, with its seat at Wilton, a settlement which began in 1854. The county name was taken from the area's first farming settlement, started in 1855, near the present location of the city of Waseca. That settlement name came from the Dakota word meaning "rich," a reference to the fertile soil in the area.

The Winona and Saint Peter Railroad line past the town of Waseca was completed in the latter half of the 1860s, causing the town to bloom. By 1870 the vote was taken to relocate the county seat to that settlement.

Waseca County's boundaries have not changed since its creation.

== Geography ==
Soils of Waseca County

The Le Sueur River flows westward through the county toward its confluence with the Blue Earth River in Blue Earth County. It is augmented by the Little Le Sueur, which drains the southeast part of the county. Bull Run Creek flows westward from Silver Lake through the lower central part of the county into Blue Earth County; the Little Cobb River rises in southern Waseca County and flows westward into Blue Earth County to its confluence with the Cobb River.

The county terrain consists of low rolling hills, carved by drainages and dotted with lakes. The area is devoted to agriculture wherever possible. The terrain slopes to the north and west, with its highest point near its southeast corner, at 1,240 ft (380 m) ASL. The county has an area of 433 square miles (1,120 km^{2}), of which 423 square miles (1,100 km^{2}) is land and 9.6 square miles (25 km^{2}) (2.2%) is water.

Waseca is one of seven southern Minnesota counties that have no forest ecosystems, only prairie and savanna soils.

=== Transit ===
- Southern Minnesota Area Rural Transit

=== Major highways ===
- U.S. Highway 14
- Minnesota State Highway 13
- Minnesota State Highway 30
- Minnesota State Highway 60 (runs along north border of county only)
- Minnesota State Highway 83
- Minnesota State Highway 230

=== Adjacent counties ===
- Rice County - northeast
- Steele County - east
- Freeborn County - southeast
- Faribault County - southwest
- Blue Earth County - west
- Le Sueur County - northwest

=== Protected areas ===
- Findley State Wildlife Management Area
- Kanne State Wildlife Management Area
- Moonan State Wildlife Management Area
- Mueller State Wildlife Management Area
- Senn-Rich State Wildlife Management Area
- Teal State Wildlife Management Area
- Waseca State Wildlife Management Area

=== Lakes ===
- Buffalo Lake
- Clear Lake
- Everson Lake
- Goose Lake
- Hayes Lake
- Knutsen Lake
- Lake Elysian (part)
- Lilly Lake
- Lily Lake (part)
- Loon Lake
- Mott Lake
- Reeds Lake
- Reese Lake
- Rice Lake (Janesville Township)
- Rice Lake (Woodville Township)
- Saint Olaf Lake
- Sibert Lake
- Silver Lake
- Toners Lake
- Trenton Lake (part)
- Watkins Lake

== Demographics ==
Historical population
| Census | Pop. | Note | %± |
|---|---|---|---|
| 1860 | 2,601 | | — |
| 1870 | 7,854 | | 202.0% |
| 1880 | 12,385 | | 57.7% |
| 1890 | 13,313 | | 7.5% |
| 1900 | 14,760 | | 10.9% |
| 1910 | 13,466 | | −8.8% |
| 1920 | 14,133 | | 5.0% |
| 1930 | 14,412 | | 2.0% |
| 1940 | 15,186 | | 5.4% |
| 1950 | 14,957 | | −1.5% |
| 1960 | 16,041 | | 7.2% |
| 1970 | 16,663 | | 3.9% |
| 1980 | 18,448 | | 10.7% |
| 1990 | 18,079 | | −2.0% |
| 2000 | 19,526 | | 8.0% |
| 2010 | 19,136 | | −2.0% |
| 2020 | 18,968 | | −0.9% |
| 2025 (est.) | 18,688 | ▼ | −1.5% |
U.S. Decennial Census; 1790-1960 1900-1990; 1990-2000 2010-2020

=== Racial and ethnic composition ===
Waseca County, Minnesota – Racial and ethnic composition Note: the US Census treats Hispanic/Latino as an ethnic category. This table excludes Latinos from the racial categories and assigns them to a separate category. Hispanics/Latinos may be of any race.
| Race / Ethnicity (NH = Non-Hispanic) | Pop 1980 | Pop 1990 | Pop 2000 | Pop 2010 | Pop 2020 | % 1980 | % 1990 | % 2000 | % 2010 | % 2020 |
|---|---|---|---|---|---|---|---|---|---|---|
| White alone (NH) | 18,229 | 17,814 | 18,198 | 17,308 | 16,538 | 98.81% | 98.53% | 93.20% | 90.45% | 87.19% |
| Black or African American alone (NH) | 22 | 26 | 435 | 371 | 336 | 0.12% | 0.14% | 2.23% | 1.94% | 1.77% |
| Native American or Alaska Native alone (NH) | 7 | 35 | 111 | 129 | 114 | 0.04% | 0.19% | 0.57% | 0.67% | 0.60% |
| Asian alone (NH) | 45 | 74 | 89 | 127 | 111 | 0.24% | 0.41% | 0.46% | 0.66% | 0.59% |
| Native Hawaiian or Pacific Islander alone (NH) | x | x | 6 | 4 | 12 | x | x | 0.03% | 0.02% | 0.06% |
| Other race alone (NH) | 4 | 1 | 8 | 8 | 21 | 0.02% | 0.01% | 0.04% | 0.04% | 0.11% |
| Mixed race or Multiracial (NH) | x | x | 113 | 204 | 565 | x | x | 0.58% | 1.07% | 2.98% |
| Hispanic or Latino (any race) | 141 | 129 | 566 | 985 | 1,271 | 0.76% | 0.71% | 2.90% | 5.15% | 6.70% |
| Total | 18,448 | 18,079 | 19,526 | 19,136 | 18,968 | 100.00% | 100.00% | 100.00% | 100.00% | 100.00% |

=== 2020 census ===
As of the 2020 census, the county had a population of 18,968. The median age was 40.6 years. 23.3% of residents were under the age of 18 and 18.4% of residents were 65 years of age or older. For every 100 females there were 94.0 males, and for every 100 females age 18 and over there were 90.0 males age 18 and over.

The racial makeup of the county was 89.8% White, 1.9% Black or African American, 0.8% American Indian and Alaska Native, 0.6% Asian, 0.1% Native Hawaiian and Pacific Islander, 2.1% from some other race, and 4.8% from two or more races. Hispanic or Latino residents of any race comprised 6.7% of the population.

48.6% of residents lived in urban areas, while 51.4% lived in rural areas.

There were 7,387 households in the county, of which 29.3% had children under the age of 18 living in them. Of all households, 51.2% were married-couple households, 18.5% were households with a male householder and no spouse or partner present, and 22.1% were households with a female householder and no spouse or partner present. About 27.8% of all households were made up of individuals and 12.7% had someone living alone who was 65 years of age or older.

There were 7,895 housing units, of which 6.4% were vacant. Among occupied housing units, 77.5% were owner-occupied and 22.5% were renter-occupied. The homeowner vacancy rate was 1.4% and the rental vacancy rate was 5.4%.

=== 2000 census ===
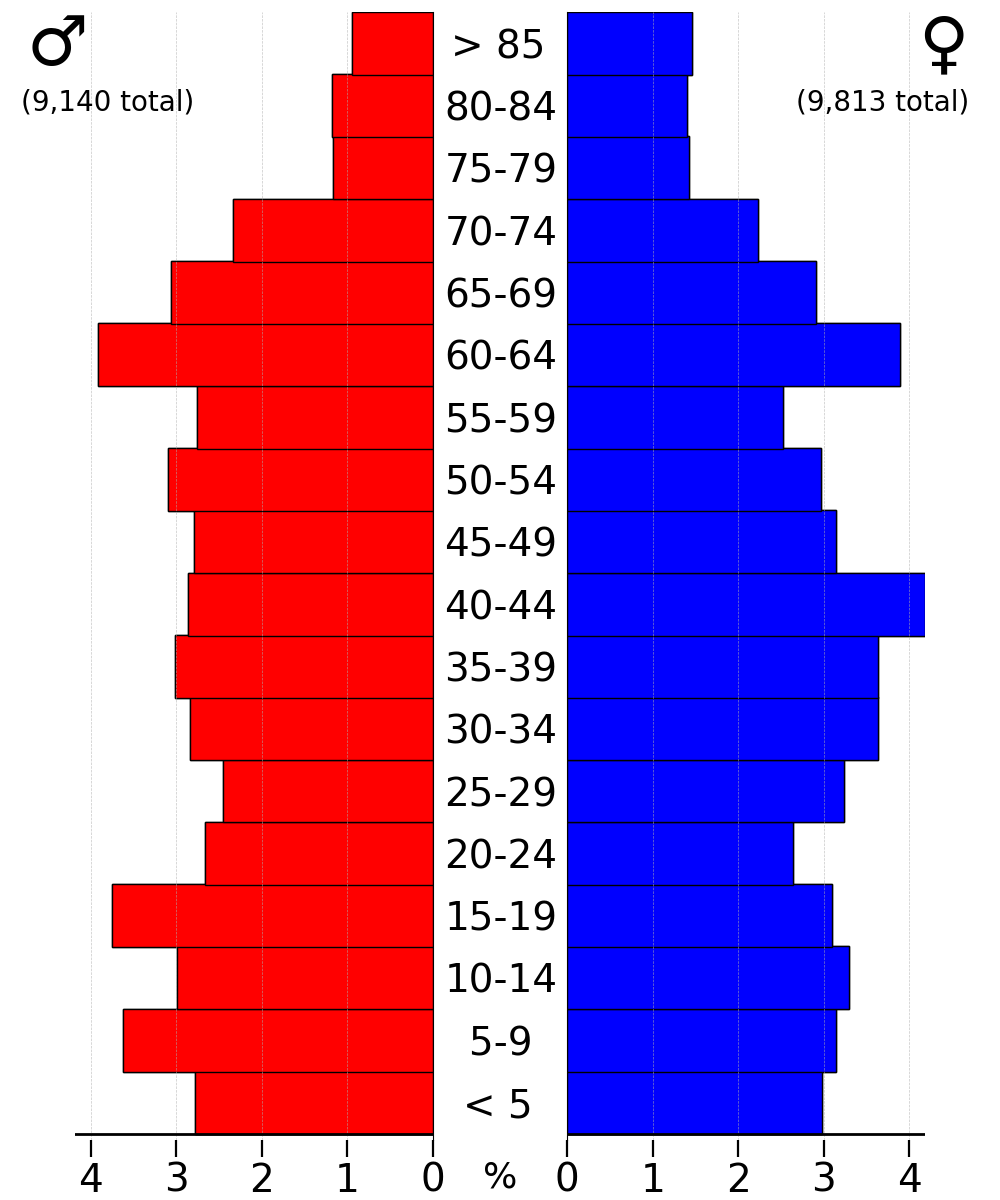
2022 US Census population pyramid for Waseca County, from ACS 5-year estimates

As of the census of 2000, there were 19,526 people, 7,059 households, and 4,990 families in the county. The population density was 46.2 per square mile (17.8/km^{2}). There were 7,427 housing units at an average density of 17.6 per square mile (6.8/km^{2}). The racial makeup of the county was 94.65% White, 2.26% Black or African American, 0.59% Native American, 0.46% Asian, 0.03% Pacific Islander, 1.29% from other races, and 0.71% from two or more races. 2.90% of the population were Hispanic or Latino of any race. 47.6% were of German, 15.5% Norwegian, 7.4% Irish and 5.5% American ancestry.

There were 7,059 households, of which 34.7% had children under the age of 18 living with them, 59.0% were married couples living together, 7.8% had a female householder with no husband present, and 29.3% were non-families. 25.1% of all households were made up of individuals, and 10.70% had someone living alone who was 65 or older. The average household size was 2.56 and the average family size was 3.07.

The county population contained 25.8% under 18, 8.7% from 18 to 24, 30.0% from 25 to 44, 21.3% from 45 to 64, and 14.2% who were 65 or older. The median age was 36. For every 100 females there were 109.3 males. For every 100 females 18 and over, there were 111.3 males.

The median income for a household in the county was $42,440, and the median income for a family was $50,081. Males had a median income of $34,380 versus $22,630 for females. The per capita income was $18,631. About 4.5% of families and 6.5% of the population were below the poverty line, including 8.8% of those under 18 and 5.8% of those 65 or over.

== Communities ==
=== Cities ===
- Elysian (part)
- Janesville
- New Richland
- Waldorf
- Waseca (county seat)

=== Unincorporated communities ===
- Alma City
- Lake Elysian
- Matawan
- Otisco
- Palmer
- Saint Mary
- Smiths Mill
- Vista
- Wilton

=== Townships ===
- Alton Township
- Blooming Grove Township
- Byron Township
- Freedom Township
- Iosco Township
- Janesville Township
- New Richland Township
- Otisco Township
- St. Mary Township
- Vivian Township
- Wilton Township
- Woodville Township

== Politics ==
Waseca County has traditionally voted Republican. In only three presidential elections since 1936 has the county selected the Democratic nominee (as of 2024).

State Legislature (2025–2026)
| Position | Name | Affiliation | District |
|---|---|---|---|
| Senate | John R. Jasinski | Republican | District 19 |
| Senate | Gene Dornink | Republican | District 23 |
| House of Representatives | Keith Allen | Republican | District 19A |
| House of Representatives | Tom Sexton | Republican | District 19B |
| House of Representatives | Peggy Bennett | Republican | District 23A |

U.S Congress (2021–2023)
| Position | Name | Affiliation | District |
|---|---|---|---|
| House of Representatives | Brad Finstad | Republican | 1st |
| Senate | Amy Klobuchar | Democrat | N/A |
| Senate | Tina Smith | Democrat | N/A |

United States presidential election results for Waseca County, Minnesota
| Year | Republican | | Democratic | | Third party(ies) | |
| Year | No. | % | No. | % | No. | % |
|---|---|---|---|---|---|---|
| 1892 | 1,090 | 44.86% | 1,042 | 42.88% | 298 | 12.26% |
| 1896 | 1,902 | 58.79% | 1,244 | 38.45% | 89 | 2.75% |
| 1900 | 1,744 | 58.46% | 1,155 | 38.72% | 84 | 2.82% |
| 1904 | 1,714 | 70.13% | 631 | 25.82% | 99 | 4.05% |
| 1908 | 1,455 | 54.99% | 1,085 | 41.01% | 106 | 4.01% |
| 1912 | 553 | 20.53% | 1,062 | 39.42% | 1,079 | 40.05% |
| 1916 | 1,522 | 54.11% | 1,178 | 41.88% | 113 | 4.02% |
| 1920 | 3,626 | 71.79% | 1,257 | 24.89% | 168 | 3.33% |
| 1924 | 2,081 | 37.13% | 442 | 7.89% | 3,082 | 54.99% |
| 1928 | 3,251 | 56.94% | 2,418 | 42.35% | 41 | 0.72% |
| 1932 | 2,012 | 34.08% | 3,805 | 64.46% | 86 | 1.46% |
| 1936 | 2,482 | 39.10% | 3,520 | 55.45% | 346 | 5.45% |
| 1940 | 4,515 | 62.60% | 2,673 | 37.06% | 25 | 0.35% |
| 1944 | 4,146 | 65.04% | 2,207 | 34.62% | 22 | 0.35% |
| 1948 | 3,511 | 52.56% | 3,120 | 46.71% | 49 | 0.73% |
| 1952 | 4,962 | 69.76% | 2,132 | 29.97% | 19 | 0.27% |
| 1956 | 4,663 | 67.69% | 2,215 | 32.15% | 11 | 0.16% |
| 1960 | 4,838 | 63.36% | 2,793 | 36.58% | 5 | 0.07% |
| 1964 | 3,570 | 49.47% | 3,633 | 50.34% | 14 | 0.19% |
| 1968 | 4,292 | 56.44% | 3,057 | 40.20% | 256 | 3.37% |
| 1972 | 5,064 | 63.89% | 2,767 | 34.91% | 95 | 1.20% |
| 1976 | 4,582 | 52.04% | 4,002 | 45.45% | 221 | 2.51% |
| 1980 | 4,801 | 51.62% | 3,535 | 38.01% | 965 | 10.38% |
| 1984 | 5,509 | 60.60% | 3,527 | 38.80% | 55 | 0.60% |
| 1988 | 4,471 | 53.95% | 3,721 | 44.90% | 95 | 1.15% |
| 1992 | 3,118 | 34.62% | 3,146 | 34.93% | 2,742 | 30.45% |
| 1996 | 3,171 | 37.43% | 3,819 | 45.08% | 1,482 | 17.49% |
| 2000 | 4,608 | 51.99% | 3,694 | 41.67% | 562 | 6.34% |
| 2004 | 5,457 | 55.68% | 4,179 | 42.64% | 164 | 1.67% |
| 2008 | 5,211 | 52.70% | 4,401 | 44.51% | 276 | 2.79% |
| 2012 | 5,116 | 52.49% | 4,370 | 44.83% | 261 | 2.68% |
| 2016 | 5,967 | 61.81% | 2,838 | 29.40% | 848 | 8.78% |
| 2020 | 6,624 | 63.76% | 3,496 | 33.65% | 269 | 2.59% |
| 2024 | 6,770 | 65.18% | 3,402 | 32.75% | 215 | 2.07% |

== See also ==
- National Register of Historic Places listings in Waseca County, Minnesota
