= Perth, Minnesota =

Unincorporated community in Minnesota, US

Perth
- Unincorporated community
- Location within Minnesota
- Coordinates: 44°04′07″N 94°21′32″W
- Country: United States
- State: Minnesota
- County: Blue Earth County
- Time zone: UTC-6 (Central (EST))
  - Summer (DST): UTC-5 (EDT)

Perth is an unincorporated community in Blue Earth County, in the U.S. state of Minnesota.

== History ==
Perth was originally called Iceland. A post office called Iceland was in operation from 1867 until 1871. The present name of Perth, after Perth, Scotland, was adopted in 1905.
