= Lura Lake =

Lake in the state of Minnesota, United States

- Location within Minnesota
- Location: Blue Earth County, Minnesota
- Coordinates: 43°52′N 94°1.5′W
- Type: lake

Lura Lake is a lake in Blue Earth County, Minnesota and Faribault County, Minnesota, in the United States.

According to tradition, Lura Lake was named by government surveyors who saw "Lura" carved into a tree near the lake.
