= New Richland Township, Waseca County, Minnesota =

New Richland Township, Minnesota
- Township
- Location within the state of Minnesota New Richland Township, Minnesota (the United States)
- Coordinates: 43°53′44″N 93°28′18″W
- Country: United States
- State: Minnesota
- County: Waseca

Area
  - Total: 35.5 sq mi (91.9 km^{2})
  - Land: 35.3 sq mi (91.5 km^{2})
  - Water: 0.15 sq mi (0.4 km^{2})
- Elevation: 1,201 ft (366 m)

Population (2000)
  - Total: 497
  - Density: 14/sq mi (5.4/km^{2})
- Time zone: UTC-6 (Central (CST))
  - Summer (DST): UTC-5 (CDT)
- ZIP code: 56072
- Area code: 507
- FIPS code: 27-45880
- GNIS feature ID: 0665110

New Richland Township is a township in Waseca County, Minnesota, United States. The population was 426 at the 2020 census.

New Richland Township was organized in 1858, and named after Richland County, Wisconsin, the former home of a large share of the early settlers.

== Geography ==
According to the United States Census Bureau, the township has a total area of 35.5 square miles (91.9 km^{2}), of which 35.3 square miles (91.5 km^{2}) is land and 0.2 square mile (0.4 km^{2}) (0.42%) is water.

== Demographics ==
As of the census of 2000, there were 497 people, 170 households, and 145 families residing in the township. The population density was 14.1 people per square mile (5.4/km^{2}). There were 203 housing units at an average density of 5.7/sq mi (2.2/km^{2}). The racial makeup of the township was 99.20% White, 0.20% African American, 0.40% Asian, and 0.20% from two or more races. Hispanic or Latino of any race were 0.80% of the population.

There were 170 households, out of which 37.1% had children under the age of 18 living with them, 78.2% were married couples living together, 2.4% had a female householder with no husband present, and 14.7% were non-families. 13.5% of all households were made up of individuals, and 4.7% had someone living alone who was 65 years of age or older. The average household size was 2.92 and the average family size was 3.20.

In the township the population was spread out, with 29.6% under the age of 18, 6.8% from 18 to 24, 24.7% from 25 to 44, 25.6% from 45 to 64, and 13.3% who were 65 years of age or older. The median age was 39 years. For every 100 females, there were 121.9 males. For every 100 females age 18 and over, there were 120.1 males.

The median income for a household in the township was $51,500, and the median income for a family was $52,656. Males had a median income of $32,404 versus $21,250 for females. The per capita income for the township was $19,156. About 1.3% of families and 3.1% of the population were below the poverty line, including 4.1% of those under age 18 and 4.3% of those age 65 or over.
