= 1908 United States presidential election in Minnesota =

- November 3, 1908

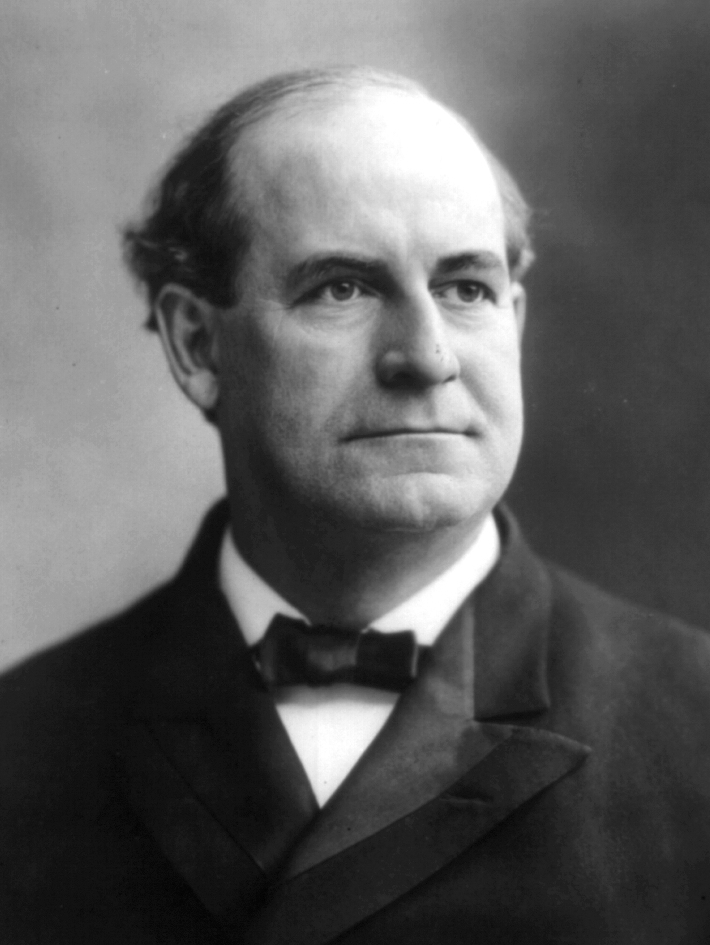
Nominee	William Howard Taft	William Jennings Bryan
Party	Republican	Democratic
Home state	Ohio	Nebraska
Running mate	James S. Sherman	John W. Kern
Electoral vote	11	0
Popular vote	195,843	109,401
Percentage	59.11%	33.02%
County results
Taft
40–50%
50–60%
60–70%
70–80%
Bryan
40–50%
50–60%
President before election
Theodore Roosevelt
Republican
Elected President
William Howard Taft
Republican

The 1908 United States presidential election in Minnesota took place on November 3, 1908, as part of the 1908 United States presidential election. State voters chose 11 electors to the Electoral College, which selected the president and vice president.

Minnesota was won by the Republican candidates, United States Secretary of War William Howard Taft of Ohio and his running mate James S. Sherman of New York. They defeated the former Nebraska Congressman and two-time prior Democratic nominee William Jennings Bryan and his running mate John W. Kern of Indiana. Taft won the state by a landslide margin of 26.09%. Taft went on to defeat Bryan nationally, with 321 electoral votes to the Democratic nominee's 162.

Bryan had previously lost Minnesota to William McKinley in both 1896 and 1900.

== Results ==
1908 United States presidential election in Minnesota
Party	Candidate	Votes	Percentage	Electoral votes
Republican	William Howard Taft	195,843	59.11%	11
Democratic	William Jennings Bryan	109,401	33.02%	0
Public Ownership	Eugene V. Debs	14,527	4.38%	0
Prohibition	Eugene W. Chafin	11,106	3.35%	0
Independence	Thomas L. Hisgen	426	0.13%	0
Totals		331,303	100.00%	11

=== Results by county ===
County	William Howard Taft Republican		William Jennings Bryan Democratic		Eugene Victor Debs Public Ownership		Eugene Wilder Chafin Prohibition		Thomas Louis Hisgen Independence		Margin		Total votes cast	
County	#	%	#	%	#	%	#	%	#	%	#	%	#	
Aitkin	1,205	67.02%	389	21.64%	143	7.95%	57	3.17%	4	0.22%	816	45.38%	1,798	AI
Anoka	1,577	68.99%	610	26.68%	42	1.84%	56	2.45%	1	0.04%	967	42.30%	2,286	AN
Becker	2,058	64.39%	728	22.78%	223	6.98%	186	5.82%	1	0.03%	1,330	41.61%	3,196	BK
Beltrami	1,882	63.41%	648	21.83%	384	12.94%	45	1.52%	9	0.30%	1,234	41.58%	2,968	BL
Benton	1,001	54.11%	765	41.35%	54	2.92%	26	1.41%	4	0.22%	236	12.76%	1,850	BN
Big Stone	965	57.78%	565	33.83%	51	3.05%	89	5.33%	0	0.00%	400	23.95%	1,670	BS
Blue Earth	3,297	56.20%	2,191	37.34%	149	2.54%	226	3.85%	4	0.07%	1,106	18.85%	5,867	BE
Brown	1,518	45.22%	1,536	45.76%	246	7.33%	55	1.64%	2	0.06%	-18	-0.54%	3,357	BR
Carlton	1,487	62.37%	506	21.22%	333	13.97%	51	2.14%	7	0.29%	981	41.15%	2,384	CT
Carver	1,739	60.03%	1,101	38.00%	21	0.72%	34	1.17%	2	0.07%	638	22.02%	2,897	CA
Cass	1,009	59.04%	461	26.97%	197	11.53%	42	2.46%	0	0.00%	548	32.07%	1,709	CS
Chippewa	1,409	58.98%	799	33.44%	32	1.34%	144	6.03%	5	0.21%	610	25.53%	2,389	CP
Chisago	2,107	79.90%	408	15.47%	71	2.69%	49	1.86%	2	0.08%	1,699	64.43%	2,637	CH
Clay	1,857	58.69%	1,125	35.56%	68	2.15%	111	3.51%	3	0.09%	732	23.14%	3,164	CY
Clearwater	779	66.07%	164	13.91%	185	15.69%	46	3.90%	5	0.42%	594 (Note: In this county where Debs ran second ahead of Bryan, margin given is Taft vote minus Debs vote and percentage margin Taft percentage minus Debs percentage.)	50.38%	1,179	CL
Cook	255	77.98%	42	12.84%	19	5.81%	11	3.36%	0	0.00%	213	65.14%	327	CK
Cottonwood	1,240	65.82%	526	27.92%	19	1.01%	98	5.20%	1	0.05%	714	37.90%	1,884	CD
Crow Wing	1,681	59.42%	661	23.37%	410	14.49%	72	2.55%	5	0.18%	1,020	36.06%	2,829	CW
Dakota	2,481	55.07%	1,778	39.47%	108	2.40%	131	2.91%	7	0.16%	703	15.60%	4,505	DK
Dodge	1,454	69.77%	515	24.71%	19	0.91%	96	4.61%	0	0.00%	939	45.06%	2,084	DO
Douglas	1,894	60.92%	979	31.49%	70	2.25%	165	5.31%	1	0.03%	915	29.43%	3,109	DG
Faribault	2,305	61.81%	1,039	27.86%	26	0.70%	357	9.57%	2	0.05%	1,266	33.95%	3,729	FA
Fillmore	3,259	69.85%	1,153	24.71%	77	1.65%	175	3.75%	2	0.04%	2,106	45.14%	4,666	FI
Freeborn	2,465	61.14%	976	24.21%	167	4.14%	421	10.44%	3	0.07%	1,489	36.93%	4,032	FB
Goodhue	4,482	74.90%	1,147	19.17%	198	3.31%	149	2.49%	8	0.13%	3,335	55.73%	5,984	GH
Grant	1,099	70.04%	376	23.96%	25	1.59%	69	4.40%	0	0.00%	723	46.08%	1,569	GR
Hennepin	27,787	58.73%	16,169	34.17%	2,273	4.80%	1,016	2.15%	68	0.14%	11,618	24.56%	47,313	HN
Houston	1,700	67.35%	745	29.52%	11	0.44%	68	2.69%	0	0.00%	955	37.84%	2,524	HS
Hubbard	1,288	69.10%	401	21.51%	124	6.65%	46	2.47%	5	0.27%	887	47.59%	1,864	HU
Isanti	1,198	58.47%	466	22.74%	185	9.03%	196	9.57%	4	0.20%	732	35.72%	2,049	IS
Itasca	1,883	63.15%	684	22.94%	367	12.31%	43	1.44%	5	0.17%	1,199	40.21%	2,982	IT
Jackson	1,575	58.94%	1,013	37.91%	24	0.90%	58	2.17%	2	0.07%	562	21.03%	2,672	JK
Kanabec	803	69.52%	242	20.95%	65	5.63%	43	3.72%	2	0.17%	561	48.57%	1,155	KA
Kandiyohi	2,312	63.62%	947	26.06%	145	3.99%	222	6.11%	8	0.22%	1,365	37.56%	3,634	KD
Kittson	969	62.12%	499	31.99%	6	0.38%	84	5.38%	2	0.13%	470	30.13%	1,560	KI
Koochiching	826	56.00%	420	28.47%	188	12.75%	39	2.64%	2	0.14%	406	27.53%	1,475	KO
Lac qui Parle	1,894	69.17%	661	24.14%	16	0.58%	167	6.10%	0	0.00%	1,233	45.03%	2,738	LQ
Lake	584	51.23%	152	13.33%	362	31.75%	41	3.60%	1	0.09%	222	19.47%	1,140	LK
Le Sueur	1,819	47.86%	1,699	44.70%	199	5.24%	79	2.08%	5	0.13%	120	3.16%	3,801	LS
Lincoln	891	53.51%	683	41.02%	27	1.62%	63	3.78%	1	0.06%	208	12.49%	1,665	LN
Lyon	1,618	56.69%	1,043	36.55%	46	1.61%	146	5.12%	1	0.04%	575	20.15%	2,854	LY
Mahnomen	265	53.64%	143	28.95%	81	16.40%	5	1.01%	0	0.00%	122	24.70%	494	MA
Marshall	1,648	59.97%	731	26.60%	177	6.44%	186	6.77%	6	0.22%	917	33.37%	2,748	MH
Martin	1,922	59.05%	1,054	32.38%	91	2.80%	184	5.65%	4	0.12%	868	26.67%	3,255	MT
McLeod	1,579	49.39%	1,506	47.11%	35	1.09%	73	2.28%	4	0.13%	73	2.28%	3,197	MD
Meeker	1,928	61.23%	1,111	35.28%	35	1.11%	74	2.35%	1	0.03%	817	25.94%	3,149	MK
Mille Lacs	1,119	61.96%	427	23.64%	168	9.30%	91	5.04%	1	0.06%	692	38.32%	1,806	ML
Morrison	1,936	53.30%	1,513	41.66%	118	3.25%	64	1.76%	1	0.03%	423	11.65%	3,632	MR
Mower	2,629	63.46%	1,206	29.11%	180	4.34%	124	2.99%	4	0.10%	1,423	34.35%	4,143	MO
Murray	1,293	59.72%	762	35.20%	33	1.52%	55	2.54%	2	0.09%	531	24.53%	2,165	MU
Nicollet	1,392	59.26%	832	35.42%	50	2.13%	72	3.07%	3	0.13%	560	23.84%	2,349	NI
Nobles	1,432	56.78%	925	36.68%	58	2.30%	107	4.24%	0	0.00%	507	20.10%	2,522	NO
Norman	1,276	55.26%	661	28.63%	177	7.67%	195	8.45%	0	0.00%	615	26.63%	2,309	NR
Olmsted	2,472	58.03%	1,621	38.05%	16	0.38%	141	3.31%	10	0.23%	851	19.98%	4,260	OL
Otter Tail	3,964	58.07%	2,320	33.99%	208	3.05%	329	4.82%	5	0.07%	1,644	24.08%	6,826	OT
Pine	1,548	56.46%	802	29.25%	303	11.05%	85	3.10%	4	0.15%	746	27.21%	2,742	PN
Pipestone	1,057	65.09%	491	30.23%	27	1.66%	49	3.02%	0	0.00%	566	34.85%	1,624	PS
Polk	3,311	55.20%	1,928	32.14%	556	9.27%	193	3.22%	10	0.17%	1,383	23.06%	5,998	PL
Pope	1,794	76.86%	442	18.94%	23	0.99%	75	3.21%	0	0.00%	1,352	57.93%	2,334	PO
Ramsey	16,556	54.64%	11,613	38.33%	1,659	5.48%	400	1.32%	72	0.24%	4,943	16.31%	30,300	RM
Red Lake	1,428	53.01%	856	31.77%	342	12.69%	60	2.23%	8	0.30%	572	21.23%	2,694	RL
Redwood	1,821	59.86%	1,076	35.37%	54	1.78%	88	2.89%	3	0.10%	745	24.49%	3,042	RW
Renville	2,275	60.22%	1,364	36.10%	28	0.74%	110	2.91%	1	0.03%	911	24.11%	3,778	RV
Rice	2,821	61.46%	1,614	35.16%	40	0.87%	111	2.42%	4	0.09%	1,207	26.30%	4,590	RC
Rock	1,234	67.25%	525	28.61%	17	0.93%	55	3.00%	4	0.22%	709	38.64%	1,835	RK
Roseau	900	50.90%	444	25.11%	361	20.42%	61	3.45%	2	0.11%	456	25.79%	1,768	RS
Saint Louis	12,076	66.08%	4,464	24.43%	1,305	7.14%	401	2.19%	28	0.15%	7,612	41.65%	18,274	SL
Scott	1,045	39.29%	1,548	58.20%	12	0.45%	52	1.95%	3	0.11%	-503	-18.91%	2,660	SC
Sherburne	1,002	67.84%	366	24.78%	42	2.84%	67	4.54%	0	0.00%	636	43.06%	1,477	SB
Sibley	1,623	57.92%	1,110	39.61%	6	0.21%	61	2.18%	2	0.07%	513	18.31%	2,802	SY
Stearns	2,614	38.75%	3,835	56.86%	159	2.36%	127	1.88%	10	0.15%	-1,221	-18.10%	6,745	ST
Steele	1,899	57.11%	1,284	38.62%	38	1.14%	104	3.13%	0	0.00%	615	18.50%	3,325	SE
Stevens	877	57.93%	582	38.44%	17	1.12%	37	2.44%	1	0.07%	295	19.48%	1,514	SV
Swift	1,343	56.17%	921	38.52%	41	1.71%	84	3.51%	2	0.08%	422	17.65%	2,391	SW
Todd	2,334	57.37%	1,305	32.08%	258	6.34%	163	4.01%	8	0.20%	1,029	25.29%	4,068	TD
Traverse	685	54.93%	514	41.22%	13	1.04%	34	2.73%	1	0.08%	171	13.71%	1,247	TR
Wabasha	2,150	58.36%	1,416	38.44%	39	1.06%	77	2.09%	2	0.05%	734	19.92%	3,684	WB
Wadena	991	63.57%	467	29.96%	70	4.49%	29	1.86%	2	0.13%	524	33.61%	1,559	WD
Waseca	1,455	54.99%	1,085	41.01%	40	1.51%	59	2.23%	7	0.26%	370	13.98%	2,646	WC
Washington	2,727	68.50%	1,120	28.13%	63	1.58%	68	1.71%	3	0.08%	1,607	40.37%	3,981	WA
Watonwan	1,411	70.44%	537	26.81%	6	0.30%	45	2.25%	4	0.20%	874	43.63%	2,003	WW
Wilkin	779	53.03%	614	41.80%	26	1.77%	48	3.27%	2	0.14%	165	11.23%	1,469	WK
Winona	3,014	48.23%	3,072	49.16%	69	1.10%	85	1.36%	9	0.14%	-58	-0.93%	6,249	WN
Wright	2,820	63.48%	1,396	31.43%	37	0.83%	184	4.14%	5	0.11%	1,424	32.06%	4,442	WR
Yellow Medicine	1,745	65.06%	786	29.31%	19	0.71%	130	4.85%	2	0.07%	959	35.76%	2,682	YM
Totals	195,843	59.11%	109,401	33.02%	14,527	4.38%	11,106	3.35%	426	0.13%	86,442	26.09	331,303	MN

== Analysis ==
=== Statistics ===
Counties with Highest Percent of Vote (Republican):

1. Chisago, 79.90%
2. Cook, 77.98%
3. Pope, 76.86%
4. Goodhue, 74.90%
5. Watonwan, 70.44%

Counties with Highest Percent of Vote (Democratic):

1. Scott, 58.20%
2. Stearns, 56.86%
3. Winona, 49.16%
4. McLeod, 47.11%
5. Brown, 45.76%

Counties with Highest Percent of Vote (Public Ownership):

1. Lake, 31.75%
2. Roseau, 20.42%
3. Mahnomen, 16.40%
4. Clearwater, 15.69%
5. Crow Wing, 14.49%

== See also ==
- United States presidential elections in Minnesota
