= Vista, Minnesota =

Unincorporated community in Minnesota, US

Vista
- Unincorporated community
- Location within Minnesota Location within the United States
- Coordinates: 43°57′26″N 93°28′00″W
- Country: United States
- State: Minnesota
- County: Waseca
- Elevation: 1,178 ft (359 m)
- Time zone: UTC-6 (Central (CST))
  - Summer (DST): UTC-5 (CDT)
- Area code: 507
- GNIS feature ID: 654988

Vista is an unincorporated community in Otisco Township, Waseca County, Minnesota, United States.
