= Otisco, Minnesota =

Unincorporated community in Minnesota, US

Otisco
- Unincorporated community
- Location within Minnesota Location within the United States
- Coordinates: 43°58′43″N 93°30′08″W
- Country: United States
- State: Minnesota
- County: Waseca
- Township: Otisco Township
- Elevation: 1,155 ft (352 m)
- Time zone: UTC-6 (Central (CST))
  - Summer (DST): UTC-5 (CDT)
- ZIP code: 56072 and 56093
- Area code: 507
- GNIS feature ID: 649035

Otisco /oʊˈtɪskoʊ/ oh-TISS-koh) is an unincorporated community in Otisco Township, Waseca County, Minnesota, United States, near New Richland and Waseca. The community is located near the junction of Waseca County Road 15 and State Highway 13 (MN 13).

Otisco was platted in 1877 when the Minneapolis and St. Louis Railway was extended to that point.
