= Woodville Township, Waseca County, Minnesota =

Woodville Township, Minnesota
- Township
- Location within the state of Minnesota Woodville Township, Minnesota (the United States)
- Coordinates: 44°4′32″N 93°28′31″W
- Country: United States
- State: Minnesota
- County: Waseca

Area
  - Total: 31.2 sq mi (80.7 km^{2})
  - Land: 30.0 sq mi (77.8 km^{2})
  - Water: 1.1 sq mi (2.9 km^{2})
- Elevation: 1,132 ft (345 m)

Population (2000)
  - Total: 2,273
  - Density: 76/sq mi (29.2/km^{2})
- Time zone: UTC-6 (Central (CST))
  - Summer (DST): UTC-5 (CDT)
- ZIP code: 56093
- Area code: 507
- FIPS code: 27-71698
- GNIS feature ID: 0666050

Woodville Township is a township in Waseca County, Minnesota, United States. The population was 1,285 at the 2020 census.

== History ==
Woodville Township was organized in 1858, and named for Eri G. and Loren Clark Wood, sibling settlers.

== Geography ==
According to the United States Census Bureau, the township has a total area of 31.2 square miles (80.7 km^{2}), of which 30.0 square miles (77.8 km^{2}) is land and 1.1 square miles (2.9 km^{2}) (3.63%) is water.

== Demographics ==
As of the census of 2000, there were 2,273 people, 467 households, and 386 families residing in the township. The population density was 75.7 inhabitants per square mile (29.2/km^{2}). There were 478 housing units at an average density of 15.9/sq mi (6.1/km^{2}). The racial makeup of the township was 84.25% White, 11.48% African American, 2.82% Native American, 0.92% Asian, 0.04% Pacific Islander, 0.22% from other races, and 0.26% from two or more races. Hispanic or Latino of any race were 1.14% of the population.

There were 467 households, out of which 40.9% had children under the age of 18 living with them, 76.0% were married couples living together, 3.4% had a female householder with no husband present, and 17.3% were non-families. 15.4% of all households were made up of individuals, and 7.3% had someone living alone who was 65 years of age or older. The average household size was 2.83 and the average family size was 3.17.

In the township the population was spread out, with 17.4% under the age of 18, 9.2% from 18 to 24, 43.8% from 25 to 44, 24.1% from 45 to 64, and 5.5% who were 65 years of age or older. The median age was 35 years.For every 100 females, there were 239.8 males. For every 100 females age 18 and over, there were 304.7 males.

The median income for a household in the township was $62,250, and the median income for a family was $66,111. Males had a median income of $42,440 versus $24,659 for females. The per capita income for the township was $22,770. About 1.6% of families and 2.7% of the population were below the poverty line, including 2.6% of those under age 18 and 5.8% of those age 65 or over.
