= St. Mary Township, Waseca County, Minnesota =

St. Mary Township, Minnesota
- Township
- Location within the state of Minnesota St. Mary Township, Minnesota (the United States)
- Coordinates: 44°4′22″N 93°34′59″W
- Country: United States
- State: Minnesota
- County: Waseca

Area
  - Total: 35.9 sq mi (93.0 km^{2})
  - Land: 35.9 sq mi (92.9 km^{2})
  - Water: 0.039 sq mi (0.1 km^{2})
- Elevation: 1,132 ft (345 m)

Population (2000)
  - Total: 504
  - Density: 14/sq mi (5.4/km^{2})
- Time zone: UTC-6 (Central (CST))
  - Summer (DST): UTC-5 (CDT)
- FIPS code: 27-57274
- GNIS feature ID: 0665524

St. Mary Township is a township in Waseca County, Minnesota, United States. The population was 402 at the 2020 census.

St. Mary Township was organized in 1858, taking the name of a local Roman Catholic church.

== Geography ==
According to the United States Census Bureau, the township has a total area of 35.9 square miles (93.0 km^{2}), of which 35.9 square miles (92.9 km^{2}) is land and 0.04 square mile (0.1 km^{2}) (0.08%) is water.

== Demographics ==
As of the census of 2000, there were 504 people, 162 households, and 134 families residing in the township. The population density was 14.1 people per square mile (5.4/km^{2}). There were 163 housing units at an average density of 4.5/sq mi (1.8/km^{2}). The racial makeup of the township was 98.21% White, 0.79% African American, 0.20% Native American, 0.20% Asian, 0.20% from other races, and 0.40% from two or more races. Hispanic or Latino of any race were 0.60% of the population.

There were 162 households, out of which 45.1% had children under the age of 18 living with them, 79.6% were married couples living together, 2.5% had a female householder with no husband present, and 16.7% were non-families. 13.6% of all households were made up of individuals, and 3.7% had someone living alone who was 65 years of age or older. The average household size was 3.11 and the average family size was 3.45.

In the township the population was spread out, with 33.5% under the age of 18, 6.7% from 18 to 24, 28.4% from 25 to 44, 19.8% from 45 to 64, and 11.5% who were 65 years of age or older. The median age was 35 years. For every 100 females, there were 102.4 males. For every 100 females age 18 and over, there were 119.0 males.

The median income for a household in the township was $41,944, and the median income for a family was $44,625. Males had a median income of $31,042 versus $20,577 for females. The per capita income for the township was $14,820. About 1.9% of families and 3.2% of the population were below the poverty line, including 4.9% of those under age 18 and none of those age 65 or over.
