= St. Clair, Minnesota =

City in Minnesota, United States

St. Clair
- City
- Motto: "Roots rich in history, living for today, branching out for tomorrow"
- Location of St. Clair, Minnesota
- Coordinates: 44°05′02″N 93°51′38″W
- Country: United States
- State: Minnesota
- County: Blue Earth

Government
  - Type: Mayor - Council
  - Mayor: Marvin More

Area
  - Total: 0.65 sq mi (1.68 km^{2})
  - Land: 0.65 sq mi (1.68 km^{2})
  - Water: 0 sq mi (0.00 km^{2})
- Elevation: 978 ft (298 m)

Population (2020)
  - Total: 750
  - Density: 1,156.2/sq mi (446.43/km^{2})
- Time zone: UTC-6 (Central (CST))
  - Summer (DST): UTC-5 (CDT)
- ZIP code: 56080
- Area codes: 507/924
- FIPS code: 27-56824
- GNIS feature ID: 2396480
- Website: StClair.GovOffice2.com

St. Clair or Saint Clair is a city in Blue Earth County, Minnesota, United States, along the Le Sueur River. The population was 750 at the 2020 census. It is part of the Mankato-North Mankato Metropolitan Statistical Area.

== History ==
St. Clair was originally called Hilton, and was platted under that name in 1865. St. Clair was incorporated in 1907; the present name is in honor of General James St. Clair.

== Geography ==
According to the U.S. Census Bureau, the city has an area of 0.82 square miles (2.12 km^{2}), all land.

Minnesota State Highway 83 and County Highway 15 are two of the main routes in the community.

== Demographics ==
Historical population
Census	Pop.	Note	%±
1880	133		—
1910	323		—
1920	260		−19.5%
1930	260		0.0%
1940	286		10.0%
1950	324		13.3%
1960	373		15.1%
1970	488		30.8%
1980	655		34.2%
1990	633		−3.4%
2000	827		30.6%
2010	868		5.0%
2020	750		−13.6%
U.S. Decennial Census; 2020 Census

=== 2010 census ===
As of the census of 2010, there were 868 people, 303 households, and 225 families living in the city. The population density was 1,058.5 inhabitants per square mile (408.7/km^{2}). There were 313 housing units at an average density of 381.7 per square mile (147.4/km^{2}). The racial makeup of the city was 97.1% White, 1.2% African American, 0.1% Native American, 0.1% Pacific Islander, and 1.5% from two or more races. Hispanic or Latino of any race were 3.1% of the population.

There were 303 households, of which 42.9% had children under the age of 18 living with them, 61.4% were married couples living together, 8.9% had a female householder with no husband present, 4.0% had a male householder with no wife present, and 25.7% were non-families. 20.1% of all households were made up of individuals, and 8.3% had someone living alone who was 65 years of age or older. The average household size was 2.86 and the average family size was 3.32.

The median age in the city was 33.6 years. 31% of residents were under the age of 18; 8.4% were between the ages of 18 and 24; 26.6% were from 25 to 44; 25.6% were from 45 to 64; and 8.5% were 65 years of age or older. The gender makeup of the city was 48.2% male and 51.8% female.

=== 2000 census ===
As of the census of 2000, there were 827 people, 295 households, and 220 families living in the city. The population density was 1,492.1 inhabitants per square mile (576.1/km^{2}). There were 305 housing units at an average density of 550.3 per square mile (212.5/km^{2}). The racial makeup of the city was 100.00% White. Hispanic or Latino of any race were 0.73% of the population.

There were 295 households, out of which 44.1% had children under the age of 18 living with them. 62.4% were married couples living together, 7.5% had a female householder with no husband present, and 25.4% were non-families. 21.4% of all households were made up of individuals, and 10.2% had someone living alone who was 65 years of age or older. The average household size was 2.80 and the average family size was 3.29.

In the city, the population was spread out, with 32.3% under the age of 18, 8.5% from 18 to 24, 31.4% from 25 to 44, 18.3% from 45 to 64, and 9.6% who were 65 years of age or older. The median age was 32 years. For every 100 females, there were 98.8 males. For every 100 females age 18 and over, there were 95.1 males.

The median income for a household in the city was $43,854, and the median income for a family was $50,333. Males had a median income of $32,050 versus $22,102 for females. The per capita income for the city was $19,512. About 3.6% of families and 7.2% of the population were below the poverty line, including 7.8% of those under age 18 and 18.1% of those age 65 or over.

== Education ==
St. Clair has a public K-12 school system, St. Clair Public Schools, with one school building. The building contains a K–6 school, St. Clair Elementary School, and a 7–12 high school, St. Clair Secondary School.
