= Blooming Grove Township, Waseca County, Minnesota =

Blooming Grove Township, Minnesota
- Township
- Location within the state of Minnesota Blooming Grove Township, Minnesota (the United States)
- Coordinates: 44°9′35″N 93°27′25″W
- Country: United States
- State: Minnesota
- County: Waseca

Area
  - Total: 36.0 sq mi (93.2 km^{2})
  - Land: 35.6 sq mi (92.1 km^{2})
  - Water: 0.42 sq mi (1.1 km^{2})
- Elevation: 1,155 ft (352 m)

Population (2000)
  - Total: 523
  - Density: 15/sq mi (5.7/km^{2})
- Time zone: UTC-6 (Central (CST))
  - Summer (DST): UTC-5 (CDT)
- FIPS code: 27-06562
- GNIS feature ID: 0663618

Blooming Grove Township is a township in Waseca County, Minnesota, United States. The population was 568 at the 2020 census.

Blooming Grove Township was organized in 1858, and named for groves of blooming wild plum trees within its borders.

== Geography ==
According to the United States Census Bureau, the township has a total area of 36.0 square miles (93 km^{2}), of which 35.6 square miles (92 km^{2}) is land and 0.4 square miles (1.0 km^{2}) (1.22%) is water.

== Demographics ==
As of the census of 2000, there were 523 people, 181 households, and 154 families residing in the township. The population density was 14.7 inhabitants per square mile (5.7/km^{2}). There were 187 housing units at an average density of 5.3 per square mile (2.0/km^{2}). The racial makeup of the township was 96.94% White, 0.96% African American, 0.19% Native American, 0.38% Asian, and 1.53% from two or more races. Hispanic or Latino of any race were 0.19% of the population.

There were 181 households, out of which 39.2% had children under the age of 18 living with them, 75.7% were married couples living together, 6.6% had a female householder with no husband present, and 14.9% were non-families. 9.4% of all households were made up of individuals, and 5.0% had someone living alone who was 65 years of age or older. The average household size was 2.89 and the average family size was 3.08.

In the township the population was spread out, with 26.4% under the age of 18, 8.8% from 18 to 24, 28.5% from 25 to 44, 26.8% from 45 to 64, and 9.6% who were 65 years of age or older. The median age was 38 years. For every 100 females, there were 101.2 males. For every 100 females age 18 and over, there were 110.4 males.

The median income for a household in the township was $45,750, and the median income for a family was $48,625. Males had a median income of $30,903 versus $22,813 for females. The per capita income for the township was $17,916. About 5.2% of families and 7.3% of the population were below the poverty line, including 10.6% of those under age 18 and 8.2% of those age 65 or over.
