= Blue Earth County, Minnesota =

County in Minnesota, United States

- County
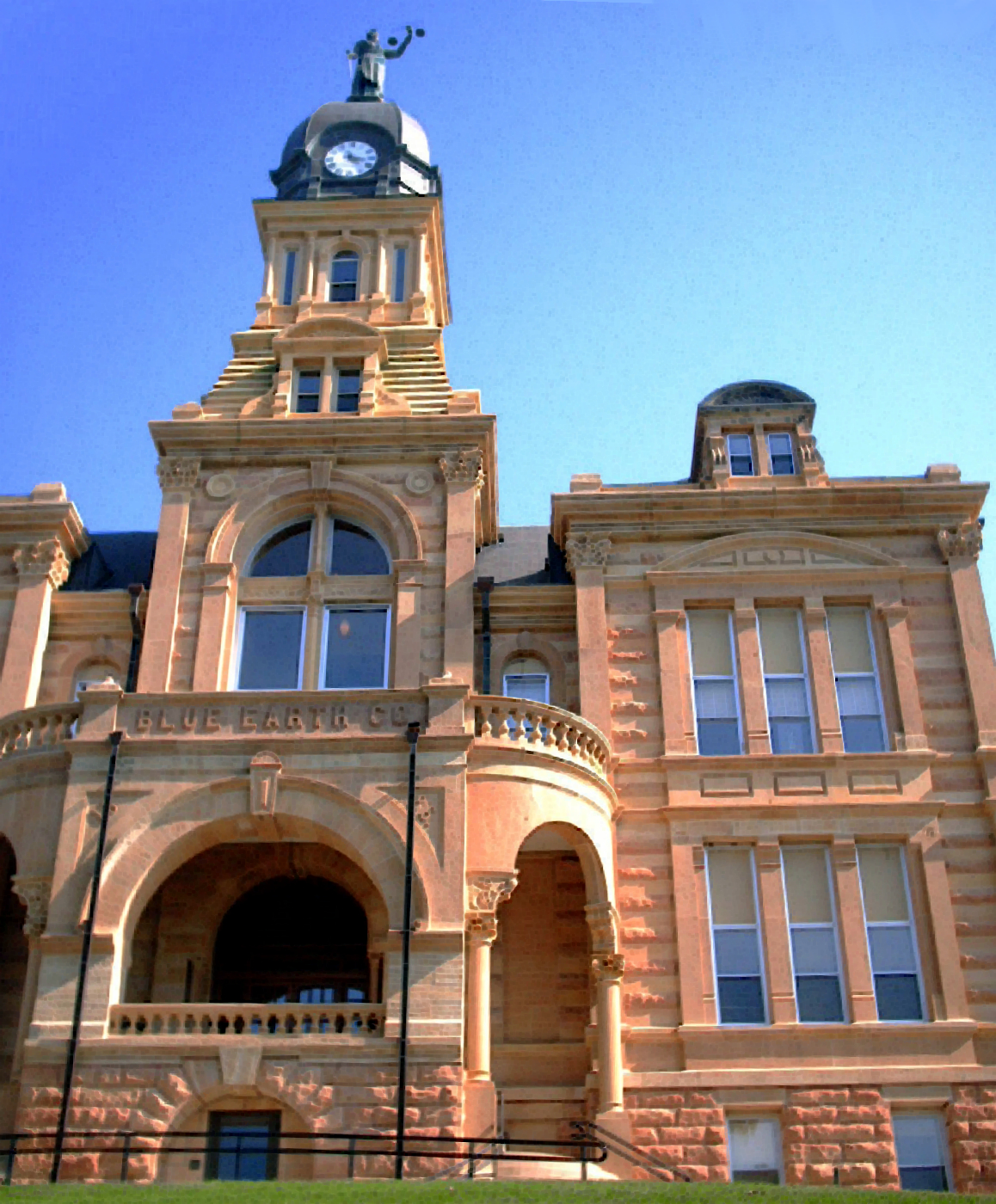
- Blue Earth County Courthouse

- Flag Seal Logo

- Location within the U.S. state of Minnesota
- Coordinates: 44°02′N 94°04′W
- Country: United States
- State: Minnesota
- Founded: March 5, 1853
- Named for: Blue Earth River
- Seat: Mankato
- Largest city: Mankato

Area
  - Total: 766 sq mi (1,980 km^{2})
  - Land: 748 sq mi (1,940 km^{2})
  - Water: 18 sq mi (47 km^{2}) 2.3%

Population (2020)
  - Total: 69,112
  - Estimate (2025): 70,634 ▲
  - Density: 92.4/sq mi (35.7/km^{2})
- Time zone: UTC−6 (Central)
  - Summer (DST): UTC−5 (CDT)
- Congressional district: 1st
- Website: blueearthcountymn.gov

Blue Earth County is a county in the state of Minnesota. As of the 2020 census, the population was 69,112. Its county seat is Mankato. The county is named for the Blue Earth River and for the deposits of blue-green clay once evident along the banks of the Blue Earth River. Blue Earth County is part of the Mankato metropolitan area.

== History ==
Dakota people lived and hunted in the area of Blue Earth County, particularly the Sisseton. French explorer Pierre-Charles Le Sueur was an early European explorer in this area, arriving where the Minnesota and Blue Earth Rivers meet. He made an unsuccessful attempt to mine copper from the blue-green clay the Dakota used as paint. The area remained under French control until 1803 when it passed to the United States in the Louisiana Purchase.

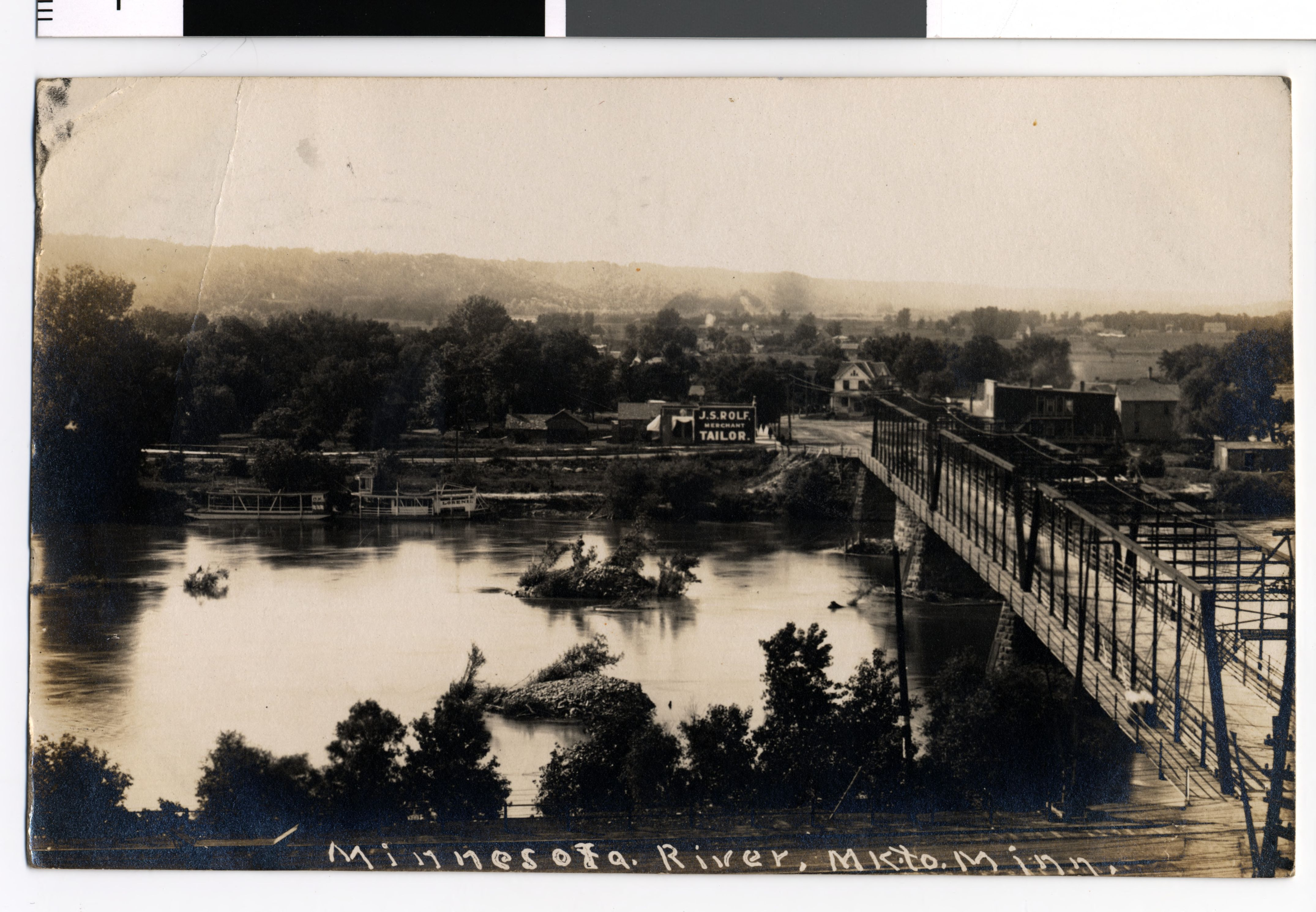
Minnesota River, Mankato, Minnesota

When Minnesota became a territory in 1849, the territorial government became interested in settling the river valley. In 1850 the first steamboat trip, starting in St. Paul, traveled on the Minnesota River and came to the Blue Earth River. The first Euro-American settlers, P. K. Johnson and Henry Jackson, debarked and settled in present-day Mankato. The ratification of the Mendota and Traverse des Sioux treaties in 1851 effectively forced the eastern Dakota to move to nearby reservations.

Blue Earth County was created after a division of the Minnesota Territory on March 5, 1853, from portions of Dakota County and free territory. It was named for the Blue Earth River. The first government officials were appointed by Alexander Ramsey, the territorial governor. That October the first election was held, with 22 ballots being taken.

On February 27, 1855, the Winnebago (Ho-Chunk) ceded 897,900 acres (363,400 ha) of their reservation near Long Prairie in exchange for 200,000 acres (81,000 ha) on the Blue Earth River. On May 24, 1855, they relocated and became so successful at farming that neighboring settlers coveted their land.

Blue Earth County is near the Lower Sioux reservation, which was created in 1858. Starvation on the reservation and the lack of timely arrival of government annuities led to the Dakota War of 1862, followed by removal of all Native Americans from the county. In 1868 the railroad's arrival promoted the county's growth and development by bringing immigrants and goods to the area.

Soils of Blue Earth County

== Geography ==
The Minnesota River flows southeast along the western part of the county's northern boundary. It is joined by the Blue Earth River, which flows north through the western central part of the county. The Watonwan River flows northwest through the northeastern part of the county, discharging into the Blue Earth. The Little Cobb River flows northwest through the southeastern part of the county, meeting with the Cobb River, which flows north through the lower part of the county into the Blue Earth River. The Le Sueur River also flows west-northwest through the southeastern part of the county, discharging into the Blue Earth River.

The county terrain consists of low rolling hills, with the area (except around built-up zones, and in areas carved by runoff) devoted to agriculture. It slopes generally to the north. Its southwest corner is 1,086 ft (331 m) above sea level.

The county has an area of 766 square miles (1,980 km^{2}), of which 748 square miles (1,940 km^{2}) is land and 18 square miles (47 km^{2}), or 2.3%, is water. The Blue Earth River and Le Sueur River flow through part of the county. The land surface is relatively flat, with over 30 lakes. There are many "closed forest savannas" that some call the "big woods" in the county's northeast. The rivers that flow out of the northeast are surrounded by these woods. Most of the county is grassland prairie but scattered parts are wet prairie. Some spots that surround the rivers are oak openings and barren brushland.

=== Major highways ===
- U.S. Highway 14
- U.S. Highway 169
- Minnesota State Highway 22
- Minnesota State Highway 30
- Minnesota State Highway 60
- Minnesota State Highway 68
- Minnesota State Highway 83

=== Lakes ===
- Crystal Lake
- Albert Lake
- Alice Lake
- Armstrong Lake
- Ballantyne Lake
- Born Lake
- Cottonwood Lake
- Duck Lake
- Eagle Lake
- George Lake
- Gilfillin Lake
- Ida Lake
- Indian Lake
- Knights Lake
- Lake Crystal
- Lieberg Lake
- Lily Lake
- Long Lake
- Loon Lake
- Lura Lake (part)
- Madison Lake
- Mennenga Lake
- Mills Lake
- Minnesota Lake (part)
- Mud Lake
- Perch Lake
- Porter Lake
- Rice Lake
- Severson Lake
- Strom Lake
- Wita Lake

=== Adjacent counties ===
- Nicollet County – north
- Le Sueur County – northeast
- Waseca County – east
- Faribault County – south
- Martin County – southwest
- Watonwan County – west
- Brown County – northwest

== Climate and weather ==
Mankato, Minnesota

Climate chart (precipitation, max. and min. temperature)
J	F	M	A	M	J	J	A	S	O	N	D
0.9 24 5	0.8 30 10	2 42 22	3.1 58 35	3.5 70 47	5.1 79 57	4.3 83 62	4.2 81 59	3.2 73 49	2.3 60 37	1.9 43 24	1.1 28 11
- █ Average max. and min. temperatures in °F
- █ Precipitation totals in inches
- Source: The Weather Channel
Metric conversion
J	F	M	A	M	J	J	A	S	O	N	D
24 −4 −15	20 −1 −12	50 6 −6	78 14 2	88 21 8	129 26 14	110 28 17	106 27 15	82 23 9	59 16 3	49 6 −4	28 −2 −12
- █ Average max. and min. temperatures in °C
- █ Precipitation totals in mm

In recent years, average temperatures in the county seat of Mankato have ranged from a low of 5 °F (−15 °C) in January to a high of 83 °F (28 °C) in July, although a record low of −35 °F (−37 °C) was recorded in February 1996 and a record high of 107 °F (42 °C) was recorded in August 1988. Average monthly precipitation ranged from 0.78 inches (20 mm) in February to 5.09 inches (129 mm) in June.

== Demographics ==
Historical population
Census	Pop.	Note	%±
1860	4,803		—
1870	17,302		260.2%
1880	22,889		32.3%
1890	29,210		27.6%
1900	32,263		10.5%
1910	29,337		−9.1%
1920	31,477		7.3%
1930	33,847		7.5%
1940	36,203		7.0%
1950	38,327		5.9%
1960	44,385		15.8%
1970	52,322		17.9%
1980	52,314		0.0%
1990	54,044		3.3%
2000	55,941		3.5%
2010	64,013		14.4%
2020	69,112		8.0%
2025 (est.)	70,634	▲	2.2%
U.S. Decennial Census; 1790-1960 1900-1990; 1990-2000 2010-2020

=== 2020 census ===
As of the 2020 census, the county had a population of 69,112. The median age was 32.3 years. 20.3% of residents were under the age of 18 and 15.1% of residents were 65 years of age or older. For every 100 females there were 100.5 males, and for every 100 females age 18 and over there were 98.2 males age 18 and over.

The racial makeup of the county was 84.2% White, 5.7% Black or African American, 0.4% American Indian and Alaska Native, 2.7% Asian, <0.1% Native Hawaiian and Pacific Islander, 1.8% from some other race, and 5.1% from two or more races. Hispanic or Latino residents of any race comprised 4.7% of the population.

66.4% of residents lived in urban areas, while 33.6% lived in rural areas.

There were 27,193 households in the county, of which 26.0% had children under the age of 18 living in them. Of all households, 42.0% were married-couple households, 22.9% were households with a male householder and no spouse or partner present, and 26.9% were households with a female householder and no spouse or partner present. About 30.3% of all households were made up of individuals and 10.3% had someone living alone who was 65 years of age or older.

There were 29,169 housing units, of which 6.8% were vacant. Among occupied housing units, 61.5% were owner-occupied and 38.5% were renter-occupied. The homeowner vacancy rate was 1.1% and the rental vacancy rate was 7.6%.

=== Racial and ethnic composition ===
Blue Earth County, Minnesota – Racial and ethnic composition Note: the US Census treats Hispanic/Latino as an ethnic category. This table excludes Latinos from the racial categories and assigns them to a separate category. Hispanics/Latinos may be of any race.
Race / Ethnicity (NH = Non-Hispanic)	Pop 1980	Pop 1990	Pop 2000	Pop 2010	Pop 2020	% 1980	% 1990	% 2000	% 2010	% 2020
White alone (NH)	51,234	52,384	52,620	58,394	57,222	97.94%	96.93%	94.06%	91.22%	82.80%
Black or African American alone (NH)	205	248	658	1,717	3,873	0.39%	0.46%	1.18%	2.68%	5.60%
Native American or Alaska Native alone (NH)	87	127	137	142	208	0.17%	0.23%	0.24%	0.22%	0.30%
Asian alone (NH)	294	791	988	1,247	1,834	0.56%	1.46%	1.77%	1.95%	2.65%
Native Hawaiian or Pacific Islander alone (NH)	x	x	34	21	24	x	x	0.06%	0.03%	0.03%
Other race alone (NH)	148	14	25	44	247	0.28%	0.03%	0.04%	0.07%	0.36%
Mixed race or Multiracial (NH)	x	x	491	862	2,483	x	x	0.88%	1.35%	3.59%
Hispanic or Latino (any race)	346	480	988	1,586	3,221	0.66%	0.89%	1.77%	2.48%	4.66%
Total	52,314	54,044	55,941	64,013	69,112	100.00%	100.00%	100.00%	100.00%	100.00%

=== 2000 census ===
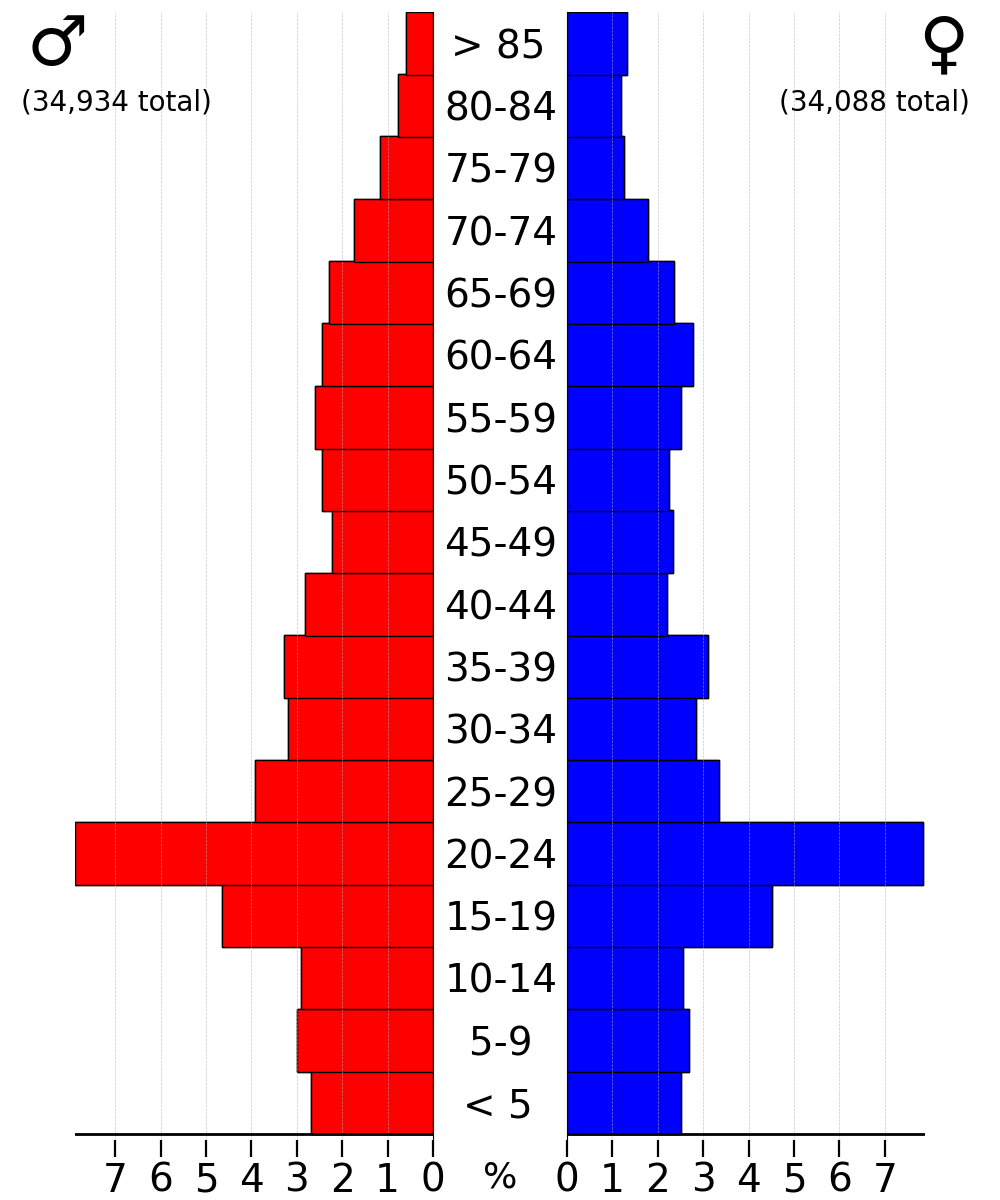
2022 US Census population pyramid for Blue Earth County, from ACS 5-year estimates

As of the census of 2000, the county had 55,941 people, 21,062 households, and 12,616 families. The population density was 74.8 per square mile (28.9/km^{2}). There were 21,971 housing units at an average density of 29.4 per square mile (11.4/km^{2}). The county's racial makeup was 94.96% White, 1.19% Black or African American, 0.28% Native American, 1.79% Asian, 0.06% Pacific Islander, 0.69% from other races, and 1.03% from two or more races. 1.77% of the population were Hispanic or Latino of any race. 47.6% were of German, 13.6% Norwegian and 6.5% Irish ancestry.

There were 21,062 households, of which 29.10% had children under the age of 18 living with them, 48.60% were married couples living together, 7.80% had a female householder with no husband present, and 40.10% were non-families. 27.10% of all households were made up of individuals, and 9.50% had someone living alone who was 65 years of age or older. The average household size was 2.46 and the average family size was 2.99.

21.40% of the county's population was under the age of 18, 22.10% were from age 18 to 24, 25.60% were from age 25 to 44, 18.80% were from age 45 to 64, and 12.10% were age 65 or older. The median age was 30 years. For every 100 females, there were 99.10 males. For every 100 females age 18 and over, there were 97.40 males.

The county's median household income was $38,940, and the median family income was $50,257. Males had a median income of $32,087 versus $22,527 for females. The county's per capita income was $18,712. About 6.10% of families and 12.90% of the population were below the poverty line, including 10.50% of those under age 18 and 9.40% of those age 65 or over.

== Communities ==
=== Cities ===
- Amboy
- Eagle Lake
- Good Thunder
- Lake Crystal
- Madison Lake
- Mankato
- Mapleton
- Minnesota Lake (partial)
- North Mankato (partial)
- Pemberton
- Saint Clair
- Skyline
- Vernon Center

=== Census-designated place ===
- Garden City

=== Unincorporated communities ===
- Cambria
- Marysburg
- Perth
- Smiths Mill

=== Townships ===
- Beauford Township
- Butternut Valley Township
- Cambria Township
- Ceresco Township
- Danville Township
- Decoria Township
- Garden City Township
- Jamestown Township
- Judson Township
- Le Ray Township
- Lime Township
- Lincoln Township
- Lyra Township
- Mankato Township
- Mapleton Township
- McPherson Township
- Medo Township
- Pleasant Mound Township
- Rapidan Township
- Shelby Township
- South Bend Township
- Sterling Township
- Vernon Center Township

== Government and politics ==
Blue Earth County has voted for the winning presidential candidate in 16 of the 19 elections since 1952, the exceptions being 1960, 1988, and 2004.

United States presidential election results for Blue Earth County, Minnesota
Year	Republican		Democratic		Third party(ies)	
Year	No.	%	No.	%	No.	%
1860	2,680	52.52%	2,399	47.01%	24	0.47%
1864	962	63.00%	565	37.00%	0	0.00%
1868	1,749	63.07%	1,024	36.93%	0	0.00%
1872	1,906	54.10%	1,617	45.90%	0	0.00%
1876	2,140	51.21%	2,039	48.79%	0	0.00%
1880	2,680	52.64%	2,399	47.12%	12	0.24%
1884	2,480	51.66%	2,028	42.24%	293	6.10%
1888	3,307	51.04%	2,761	42.61%	411	6.34%
1892	2,680	46.00%	2,399	41.18%	747	12.82%
1896	4,055	57.50%	2,744	38.91%	253	3.59%
1900	3,647	58.68%	2,254	36.27%	314	5.05%
1904	3,573	67.42%	1,419	26.77%	308	5.81%
1908	3,297	56.20%	2,191	37.34%	379	6.46%
1912	1,344	25.40%	2,025	38.27%	1,922	36.33%
1916	2,864	53.96%	2,211	41.65%	233	4.39%
1920	8,894	79.05%	1,974	17.55%	383	3.40%
1924	6,773	55.09%	1,123	9.13%	4,399	35.78%
1928	8,120	60.71%	5,177	38.70%	79	0.59%
1932	5,550	40.54%	7,925	57.88%	216	1.58%
1936	5,550	37.58%	8,255	55.89%	964	6.53%
1940	9,642	61.87%	5,880	37.73%	62	0.40%
1944	9,429	64.67%	5,098	34.96%	54	0.37%
1948	7,520	50.29%	7,272	48.63%	162	1.08%
1952	11,867	70.34%	4,952	29.35%	51	0.30%
1956	11,398	67.50%	5,467	32.38%	21	0.12%
1960	11,328	58.35%	8,052	41.48%	33	0.17%
1964	8,009	42.61%	10,687	56.85%	101	0.54%
1968	9,571	48.99%	9,254	47.37%	712	3.64%
1972	12,702	53.68%	10,638	44.96%	322	1.36%
1976	11,998	46.71%	12,930	50.33%	760	2.96%
1980	11,966	45.78%	10,930	41.82%	3,242	12.40%
1984	14,298	54.27%	11,877	45.08%	172	0.65%
1988	11,959	48.71%	12,375	50.40%	218	0.89%
1992	8,813	31.65%	11,531	41.41%	7,503	26.94%
1996	9,082	35.95%	12,420	49.17%	3,759	14.88%
2000	12,942	47.23%	12,329	44.99%	2,131	7.78%
2004	15,737	47.52%	16,865	50.92%	517	1.56%
2008	14,782	42.15%	19,325	55.10%	963	2.75%
2012	14,916	43.52%	18,164	53.00%	1,194	3.48%
2016	15,667	46.64%	14,428	42.95%	3,498	10.41%
2020	16,731	46.41%	18,330	50.84%	990	2.75%
2024	18,001	49.40%	17,558	48.18%	883	2.42%

County Board of Commissioners
Position	Name	District	Next Election
Commissioner	Patty O'Connor	District 1	2026
Commissioner and Chairperson	Vance Stuehrenberg	District 2	2024
Commissioner	Mark Piepho	District 3	2024
Commissioner and Vice Chair	Kevin Paap	District 4	2026
Commissioner	Kip Bruender	District 5	2026

State Legislature (2025-2026)
Position	Name	Affiliation	District
Senate	Gary Dahms	Republican	District 15
Senate	Nick Frentz	Democrat	District 18
Senate	Rich Draheim	Republican	District 22
House of Representatives	Paul Torkelson	Republican	District 15B
House of Representatives	Erica Schwartz	Republican	District 18A
House of Representatives	Luke Frederick	Democrat	District 18B
House of Representatives	Bjorn Olson	Democrat	District 22A
House of Representatives	Terry Stier	Republican	District 22B

U.S Congress (2025-2026)
Position	Name	Affiliation	District
House of Representatives	Brad Finstad	Republican	1st
Senate	Amy Klobuchar	Democrat	N/A
Senate	Tina Smith	Democrat	N/A

== See also ==
- National Register of Historic Places listings in Blue Earth County, Minnesota
