= Vivian Township, Waseca County, Minnesota =

Vivian Township, Minnesota
- Township
- Location within the state of Minnesota Vivian Township, Minnesota (the United States)
- Coordinates: 43°53′3″N 93°42′46″W
- Country: United States
- State: Minnesota
- County: Waseca

Area
  - Total: 35.9 sq mi (93.1 km^{2})
  - Land: 35.9 sq mi (93.1 km^{2})
  - Water: 0 sq mi (0.0 km^{2})
- Elevation: 1,086 ft (331 m)

Population (2000)
  - Total: 259
  - Density: 7.3/sq mi (2.8/km^{2})
- Time zone: UTC-6 (Central (CST))
  - Summer (DST): UTC-5 (CDT)
- FIPS code: 27-67324
- GNIS feature ID: 0665880

Vivian Township is a township in Waseca County, Minnesota, United States. The population was 229 at the 2020 census.

Vivian Township was organized in 1858.

== Geography ==
According to the United States Census Bureau, the township has a total area of 36.0 square miles (93.1 km^{2}), of which 35.9 square miles (93.1 km^{2}) is land and 0.04 square mile (0.1 km^{2}) (0.06%) is water.

== Demographics ==
As of the census of 2000, there were 259 people, 100 households, and 76 families residing in the township. The population density was 7.2 people per square mile (2.8/km^{2}). There were 109 housing units at an average density of 3.0/sq mi (1.2/km^{2}). The racial makeup of the township was 98.07% White, 0.77% from other races, and 1.16% from two or more races. Hispanic or Latino of any race were 1.93% of the population.

There were 100 households, out of which 27.0% had children under the age of 18 living with them, 72.0% were married couples living together, 1.0% had a female householder with no husband present, and 24.0% were non-families. 23.0% of all households were made up of individuals, and 10.0% had someone living alone who was 65 years of age or older. The average household size was 2.59 and the average family size was 3.05.

In the township the population was spread out, with 24.7% under the age of 18, 3.9% from 18 to 24, 25.1% from 25 to 44, 27.4% from 45 to 64, and 18.9% who were 65 years of age or older. The median age was 42 years. For every 100 females, there were 121.4 males. For every 100 females age 18 and over, there were 124.1 males.

The median income for a household in the township was $39,750, and the median income for a family was $48,750. Males had a median income of $29,375 versus $26,563 for females. The per capita income for the township was $18,016. About 3.1% of families and 6.9% of the population were below the poverty line, including 15.6% of those under the age of eighteen and none of those 65 or over.
