= Le Sueur River =

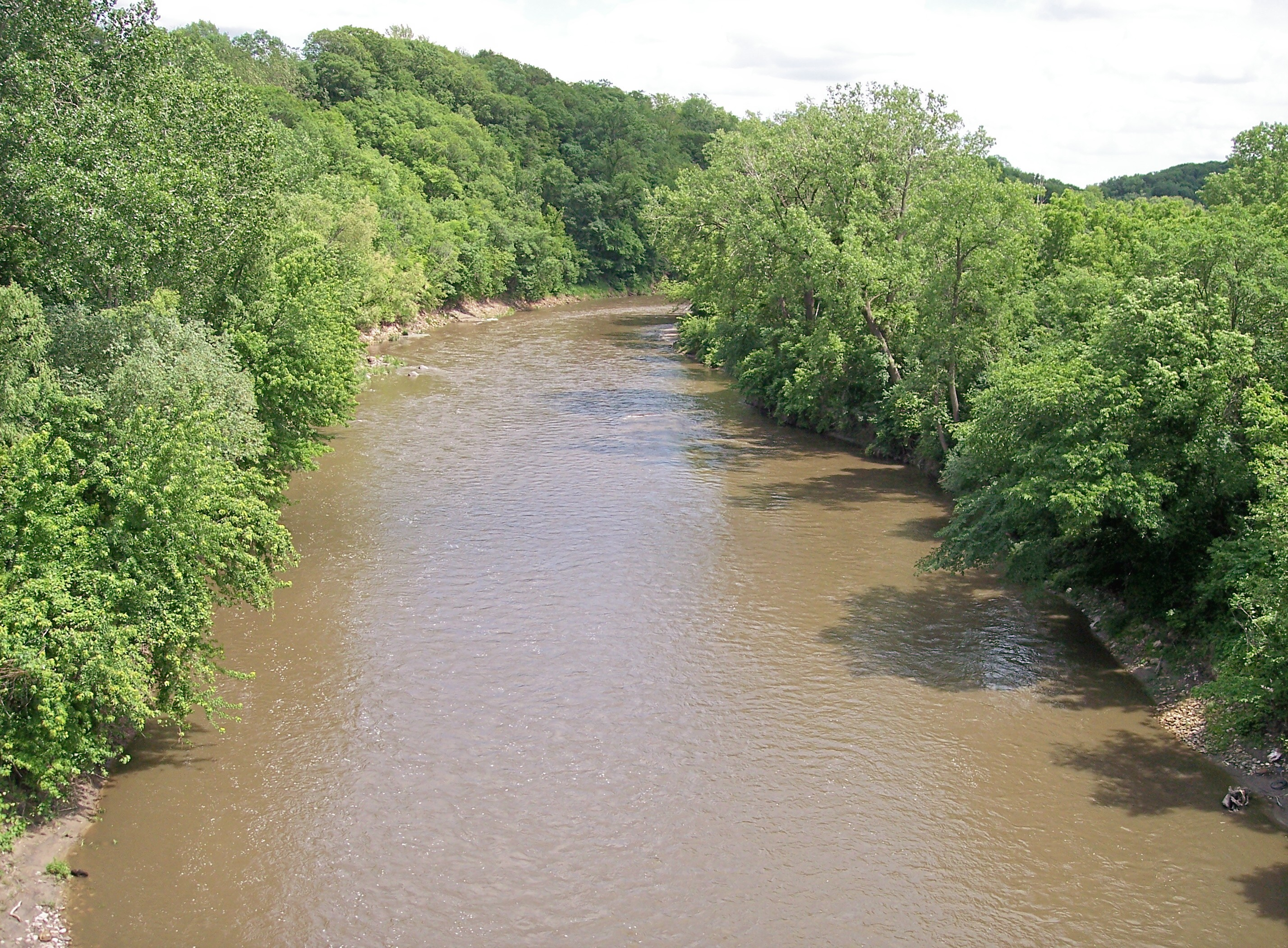
- The Le Sueur River near its mouth in South Bend Township in 2007

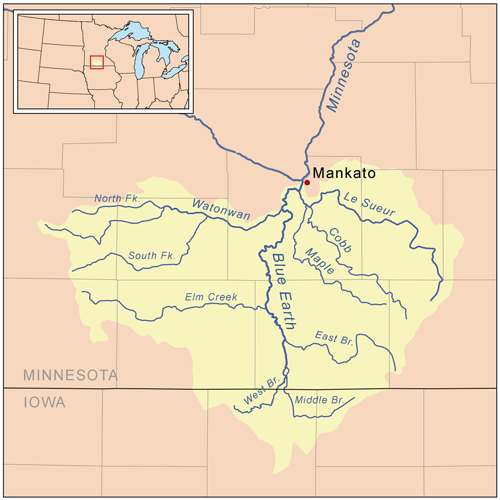
- Map of the Blue Earth watershed that shows the Le Sueur River

Location
- Country: United States
- State: Minnesota

Physical characteristics
- Source
  - location: Hartland Township, Freeborn County
  - coordinates: 43°46′03″N 93°28′13″W
  - elevation: 1,279 ft (390 m)
- Mouth: Blue Earth River
  - location: South Bend Township, Blue Earth County
  - coordinates: 44°07′36″N 94°02′52″W
  - elevation: 774 ft (236 m)
- Length: 110.9 mi (178.5 km)
- Basin size: 1,089 mi^{2} (2,820 km^{2})
- Discharge
  - location: near Rapidan
  - average: 549 cu ft/s (15.5 m^{3}/s)
  - minimum: 1.6 cu ft/s (0.045 m^{3}/s)
  - maximum: 24,700 cu ft/s (700 m^{3}/s)

Basin features
- Tributaries
  - left: Cobb River, Maple River

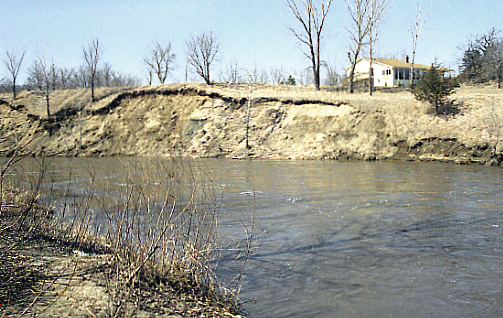
The Le Sueur River in Blue Earth County in 1996

The Le Sueur River (lay-SEWER) is a tributary of the Blue Earth River, 111 miles (179 km) long, in southern Minnesota in the United States. Via the Blue Earth and Minnesota Rivers, it is part of the watershed of the Mississippi River, draining an area of 1,089 square miles (2,820 km^{2}). It is the largest tributary of the Blue Earth River, draining 31% of its watershed.

Le Sueur River was named for Pierre-Charles Le Sueur, a French explorer of North America.

== Course ==
The Le Sueur River rises in Hartland Township in northwestern Freeborn County and flows initially northwardly, through the southwestern extremity of Steele County into Waseca County, then westwardly in a winding course into Blue Earth County, passing through St. Clair. It flows into the Blue Earth River southwest of Mankato, approximately three miles (4.8 km) upstream of the Blue Earth's mouth at the Minnesota River. Its largest tributaries are the Cobb and Maple Rivers, which it collects from the south approximately six and eight miles (10 km/13 km) upstream of its mouth, respectively. A minor tributary of the Le Sueur River in Waseca and Steele Counties is known as the Little Le Sueur River.

The Le Sueur River flows in most of its course on till plains and on the plain of a former glacial lake, through deeply incised ravines in its lower course. Extensions of the Big Woods, a tract of hardwoods that has since been largely converted to agricultural use, historically followed the river's riparian corridor southward. According to the Minnesota Pollution Control Agency, approximately 84% of the larger watershed of the Blue Earth River is used for agricultural cultivation, primarily that of corn and soybeans.

== Flow rate ==
At the United States Geological Survey's stream gauge near the community of Rapidan, two miles (3.2 km) upstream from the river's mouth, the annual mean flow of the river between 1940 and 2005 was 549 cubic feet per second (15.5 m^{3}/s). The highest recorded flow during the period was 24,700 cu ft/s (700 m^{3}/s) on April 8, 1965. The lowest recorded flow was 1.6 cu ft/s (0.045 m^{3}/s) on February 9, 1959.

== See also ==
- List of rivers in Minnesota
