= Waldorf, Minnesota =

City in Minnesota, United States

Waldorf
- City
- Location of Waldorf, Minnesota
- Coordinates: 43°55′59″N 93°41′51″W
- Country: United States
- State: Minnesota
- County: Waseca

Government
  - Type: Mayor - Council
  - Mayor: Rob Wilkening

Area
  - Total: 0.38 sq mi (0.98 km^{2})
  - Land: 0.38 sq mi (0.98 km^{2})
  - Water: 0 sq mi (0.00 km^{2})
- Elevation: 1,083 ft (330 m)

Population (2020)
  - Total: 201
  - Density: 530.9/sq mi (204.97/km^{2})
- Time zone: UTC-6 (Central (CST))
  - Summer (DST): UTC-5 (CDT)
- ZIP code: 56091
- Area code: 507
- FIPS code: 27-67756
- GNIS feature ID: 2397171
- Website: https://cityofwaldorf.com/

Waldorf is a town in Waseca County, Minnesota, United States. The population was 201 at the 2020 census.

== Geography ==
According to the United States Census Bureau, the town has a total area of 0.38 square miles (0.98 km^{2}), all land.

== Demographics ==
Historical population
Census	Pop.	Note	%±
1930	183		—
1940	240		31.1%
1950	266		10.8%
1960	270		1.5%
1970	285		5.6%
1980	249		−12.6%
1990	243		−2.4%
2000	242		−0.4%
2010	229		−5.4%
2020	201		−12.2%
U.S. Decennial Census

=== 2010 census ===
As of the census of 2010, there were 229 people, 100 households, and 66 families living in the town. The population density was 602.6 inhabitants per square mile (232.7/km^{2}). There were 115 housing units at an average density of 302.6 per square mile (116.8/km^{2}). The racial makeup of the city was 99.6% White and 0.4% Asian.

There were 100 households, of which 28.0% had children under the age of 18 living with them, 55.0% were married couples living together, 9.0% had a female householder with no husband present, 2.0% had a male householder with no wife present, and 34.0% were non-families. 30.0% of all households were made up of individuals, and 10% had someone living alone who was 65 years of age or older. The average household size was 2.29 and the average family size was 2.82.

The median age in the town was 42.1 years. 24% of residents were under the age of 18; 6.5% were between the ages of 18 and 24; 23.7% were from 25 to 44; 27.1% were from 45 to 64; and 18.8% were 65 years of age or older. The gender makeup of the city was 51.5% male and 48.5% female.

=== 2000 census ===
As of the census of 2000, there were 242 people, 103 households, and 70 families living in the town. The population density was 630.4 inhabitants per square mile (243.4/km^{2}). There were 115 housing units at an average density of 299.6 per square mile (115.7/km^{2}). The racial makeup of the city was 99.59% White and 0.41% Asian. Hispanic or Latino of any race were 1.65% of the population.

There were 103 households, out of which 23.3% had children under the age of 18 living with them, 57.3% were married couples living together, 5.8% had a female householder with no husband present, and 32.0% were non-families. 25.2% of all households were made up of individuals, and 8.7% had someone living alone who was 65 years of age or older. The average household size was 2.35 and the average family size was 2.81.

In the town, the population was spread out, with 21.9% under the age of 18, 12.0% from 18 to 24, 23.1% from 25 to 44, 28.5% from 45 to 64, and 14.5% who were 65 years of age or older. The median age was 41 years. For every 100 females, there were 101.7 males. For every 100 females age 18 and over, there were 101.1 males.

The median income for a household in the city was $37,500, and the median income for a family was $41,250. Males had a median income of $29,375 versus $21,250 for females. The per capita income for the city was $16,941. About 6.2% of families and 15.6% of the population were below the poverty line, including 27.6% of those under the age of eighteen and 18.9% of those 65 or over.

== History ==
A post office called Waldorf has been in operation since 1908. According to Warren Upham, the community may be named after Waldorf, Maryland.
