= Iosco Township, Michigan =

- Civil township
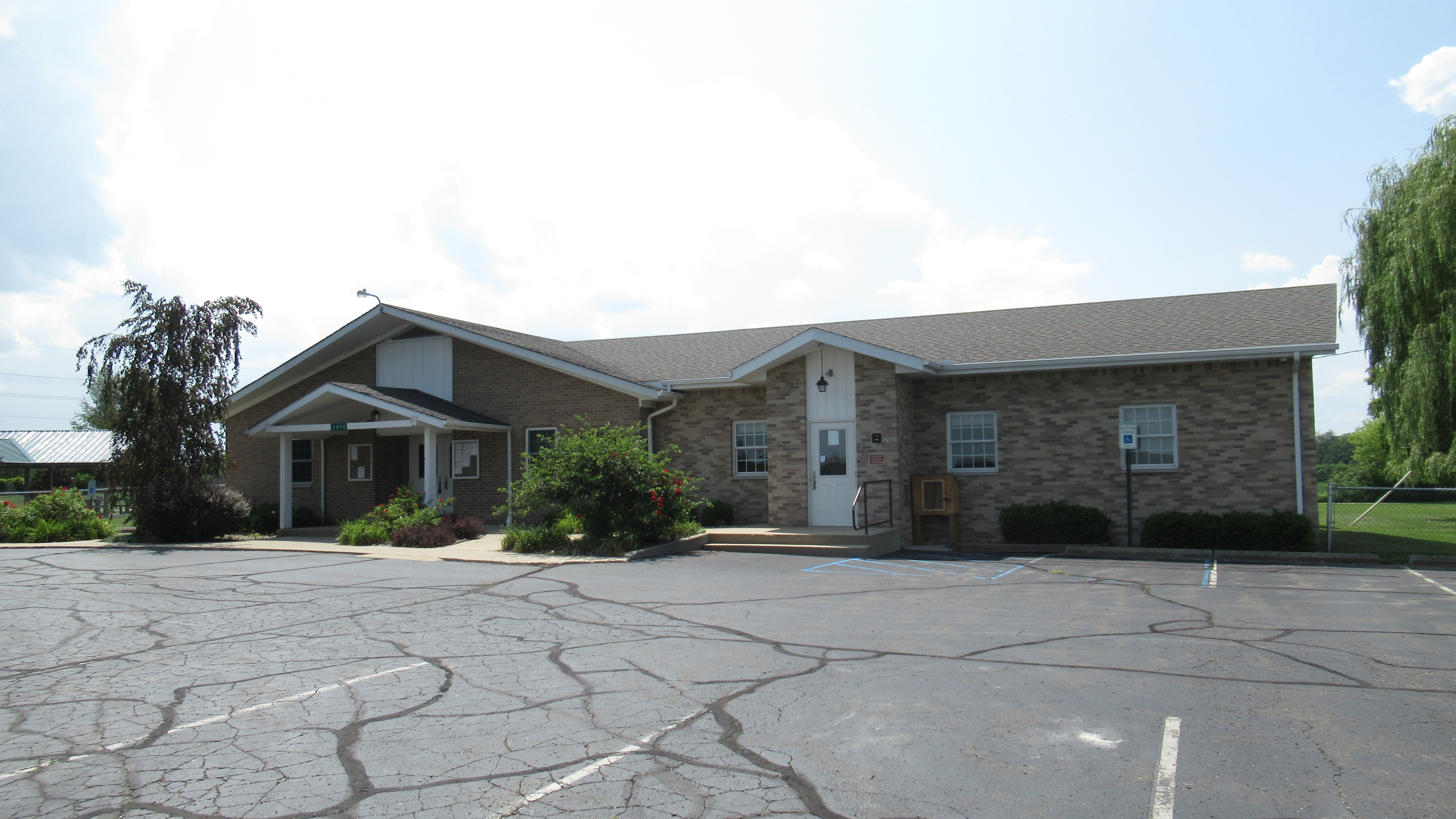
- Iosco Township Hall

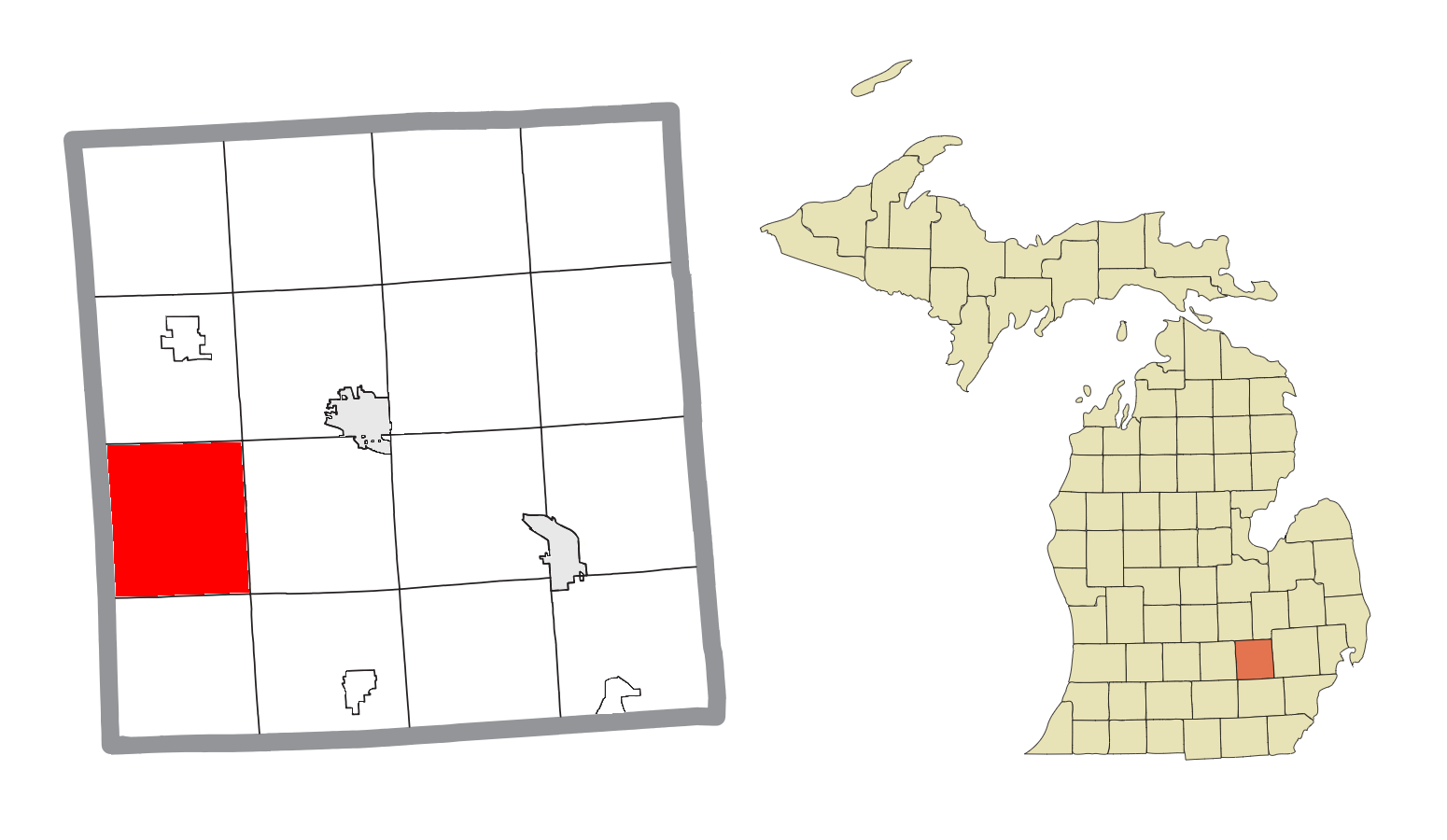
- Location within Livingston County

- Location in Michigan Location in the United States
- Coordinates: 42°33′06″N 84°04′46″W
- Country: United States
- State: Michigan
- County: Livingston
- Established: 1838

Government
  - Supervisor: Peter Miller
  - Clerk: Dan Delmerico

Area
  - Total: 35.4 sq mi (91.8 km^{2})
  - Land: 35.2 sq mi (91.1 km^{2})
  - Water: 0.23 sq mi (0.6 km^{2})
- Elevation: 928 ft (283 m)

Population (2020)
  - Total: 3,870
  - Density: 110/sq mi (42.5/km^{2})
- Time zone: UTC-5 (Eastern (EST))
  - Summer (DST): UTC-4 (EDT)
- ZIP code(s): 48137 (Gregory); 48836 (Fowlerville); 48843 (Howell); 48892 (Webberville); 49285 (Stockbridge)
- Area code: 517
- FIPS code: 26-40900
- GNIS feature ID: 1626523
- Website: ioscotwp.com

Iosco Township is a civil township of Livingston County in the U.S. state of Michigan. The population was 3,870 at the 2020 census, up from 3,801 at the 2010 census.

== Community ==
- Parkers Corners, also Iosco, is an unincorporated community in the township at West Iosco and Bradley roads. (42°34′05″N 84°06′48″W).

== Geography ==
Iosco Township is in western Livingston County, bordered to the west by Ingham County. According to the United States Census Bureau, the township has a total area of 35.4 square miles (91.8 km^{2}), of which 35.2 square miles (91.1 km^{2}) are land and 0.2 square miles (0.6 km^{2}), or 0.71%, are water. The township is drained by north-flowing headwaters of the Red Cedar River, leading to the Grand River and eventually Lake Michigan.

== Demographics ==
As of the census of 2000, there were 3,039 people, 921 households, and 796 families residing in the township. The population density was 85.6 inhabitants per square mile (33.1/km^{2}). There were 964 housing units at an average density of 27.2 per square mile (10.5/km^{2}). The racial makeup of the township was 94.83% White, 0.07% African American, 0.49% Native American, 0.59% Asian, 2.90% from other races, and 1.12% from two or more races. Hispanic or Latino of any race were 3.72% of the population.

There were 921 households, out of which 47.9% had children under the age of 18 living with them, 79.0% were married couples living together, 4.1% had a female householder with no husband present, and 13.5% were non-families. 9.8% of all households were made up of individuals, and 2.5% had someone living alone who was 65 years of age or older. The average household size was 3.19 and the average family size was 3.40.

In the township the population was spread out, with 32.6% under the age of 18, 7.4% from 18 to 24, 32.9% from 25 to 44, 22.0% from 45 to 64, and 5.0% who were 65 years of age or older. The median age was 33 years. For every 100 females, there were 108.6 males. For every 100 females age 18 and over, there were 102.5 males.

The median income for a household in the township was $63,808, and the median income for a family was $65,156. Males had a median income of $49,191 versus $28,889 for females. The per capita income for the township was $20,675. About 3.2% of families and 6.6% of the population were below the poverty line, including 4.8% of those under age 18 and 12.0% of those age 65 or over.
