= Iosco Township, Waseca County, Minnesota =

Iosco Township, Minnesota
- Township
- Location within the state of Minnesota Iosco Township, Minnesota (the United States)
- Coordinates: 44°9′17″N 93°35′49″W
- Country: United States
- State: Minnesota
- County: Waseca

Area
  - Total: 35.8 sq mi (92.6 km^{2})
  - Land: 35.1 sq mi (90.8 km^{2})
  - Water: 0.69 sq mi (1.8 km^{2})
- Elevation: 1,122 ft (342 m)

Population (2000)
  - Total: 598
  - Density: 17/sq mi (6.6/km^{2})
- Time zone: UTC-6 (Central (CST))
  - Summer (DST): UTC-5 (CDT)
- FIPS code: 27-31166
- GNIS feature ID: 0664553

Iosco Township is a township in Waseca County, Minnesota, United States. The population was 509 at the 2020 census.

Iosco Township was organized in 1858.

== Geography ==
According to the United States Census Bureau, the township has a total area of 35.8 square miles (93 km^{2}), of which 35.0 square miles (91 km^{2}) is land and 0.7 square miles (1.8 km^{2}) (1.96%) is water.

== Demographics ==
As of the census of 2000, there were 598 people, 221 households, and 169 families residing in the township. The population density was 17.1 inhabitants per square mile (6.6/km^{2}). There were 249 housing units at an average density of 7.1 per square mile (2.7/km^{2}). The racial makeup of the township was 98.33% White, 0.33% Asian, 0.17% Pacific Islander, 0.33% from other races, and 0.84% from two or more races. Hispanic or Latino of any race were 0.84% of the population.

There were 221 households, out of which 34.8% had children under the age of 18 living with them, 69.7% were married couples living together, 4.5% had a female householder with no husband present, and 23.1% were non-families. 18.1% of all households were made up of individuals, and 3.2% had someone living alone who was 65 years of age or older. The average household size was 2.71 and the average family size was 3.12.

In the township the population was spread out, with 27.3% under the age of 18, 7.2% from 18 to 24, 27.6% from 25 to 44, 29.4% from 45 to 64, and 8.5% who were 65 years of age or older. The median age was 39 years. For every 100 females, there were 124.8 males. For every 100 females age 18 and over, there were 119.7 males.

The median income for a household in the township was $60,750, and the median income for a family was $64,028. Males had a median income of $37,000 versus $23,958 for females. The per capita income for the township was $26,709. About 4.5% of families and 8.5% of the population were below the poverty line, including 13.7% of those under age 18 and 4.8% of those age 65 or over.
