= Pemberton, Minnesota =

City in Minnesota, United States

Pemberton
- City
- Nickname: The Pit
- Motto: "Where tomorrow begins today"
- Location of Pemberton, Minnesota
- Coordinates: 44°00′31″N 93°47′02″W
- Country: United States
- State: Minnesota
- County: Blue Earth
- Founded: 1907
- Incorporated: April 26, 1946

Government
  - Type: Mayor - Council
  - Mayor: Ken Spielman

Area
  - Total: 0.19 sq mi (0.49 km^{2})
  - Land: 0.19 sq mi (0.49 km^{2})
  - Water: 0 sq mi (0.00 km^{2})
- Elevation: 1,047 ft (319 m)

Population (2020)
  - Total: 229
  - Estimate (2021): 232
  - Density: 1,219.6/sq mi (470.89/km^{2})
- Time zone: UTC-6 (CST)
  - Summer (DST): UTC-5 (CDT)
- ZIP code: 56078
- Area code: 507
- FIPS code: 27-50200
- GNIS feature ID: 2396175
- Website: pembertonmn

Pemberton is a city in Blue Earth County, Minnesota, United States. The population was 229 at the 2020 census. It is part of the Mankato-North Mankato Metropolitan Statistical Area.

== History ==
The area of Pemberton had businesses as early as 1894. While many of these building burned prior to the Alphabet Railroad coming through, land was platted in 1907 for the town with the plans for a depot. The town is named for one of the railroad officials.

== Geography ==
According to the United States Census Bureau, the city has a total area of 0.18 square miles (0.47 km^{2}), all land.

== Demographics ==
Historical population
Census	Pop.	Note	%±
1950	152		—
1960	177		16.4%
1970	128		−27.7%
1980	208		62.5%
1990	228		9.6%
2000	246		7.9%
2010	247		0.4%
2020	229		−7.3%
2021 (est.)	232		1.3%
U.S. Decennial Census; 2020 Census

=== 2010 census ===
As of the census of 2010, there were 247 people, 91 households, and 68 families living in the city. The population density was 1,372.2 inhabitants per square mile (529.8/km^{2}). There were 98 housing units at an average density of 544.4 per square mile (210.2/km^{2}). The racial makeup of the city was 98.0% White, 0.4% Asian, 1.2% from other races, and 0.4% from two or more races. Hispanic or Latino of any race were 3.2% of the population.

There were 91 households, of which 37.4% had children under the age of 18 living with them, 57.1% were married couples living together, 14.3% had a female householder with no husband present, 3.3% had a male householder with no wife present, and 25.3% were non-families. 19.8% of all households were made up of individuals, and 4.4% had someone living alone who was 65 years of age or older. The average household size was 2.71 and the average family size was 3.10.

The median age in the city was 33.4 years. 30.8% of residents were under the age of 18; 6.1% were between the ages of 18 and 24; 32% were from 25 to 44; 21.9% were from 45 to 64; and 9.3% were 65 years of age or older. The gender makeup of the city was 47.4% male and 52.6% female.

=== 2000 census ===
As of the census of 2000, there were 246 people, 84 households, and 64 families living in the city. The population density was 1,196.4 inhabitants per square mile (461.9/km^{2}). There were 86 housing units at an average density of 418.2 per square mile (161.5/km^{2}). The racial makeup of the city was 99.19% White, and 0.81% from two or more races.

There were 84 households, out of which 41.7% had children under the age of 18 living with them, 64.3% were married couples living together, 8.3% had a female householder with no husband present, and 23.8% were non-families. 19.0% of all households were made up of individuals, and 7.1% had someone living alone who was 65 years of age or older. The average household size was 2.93 and the average family size was 3.44.

In the city, the population was spread out, with 29.7% under the age of 18, 12.6% from 18 to 24, 30.1% from 25 to 44, 19.9% from 45 to 64, and 7.7% who were 65 years of age or older. The median age was 31 years. For every 100 females, there were 103.3 males. For every 100 females age 18 and over, there were 98.9 males.

The median income for a household in the city was $39,167, and the median income for a family was $42,222. Males had a median income of $25,714 versus $22,361 for females. The per capita income for the city was $17,640. None of the families and 4.1% of the population were living below the poverty line, including no under eighteens and 21.1% of those over 64.
