= Freedom Township, Waseca County, Minnesota =

Freedom Township, Minnesota
- Township
- Location within the state of Minnesota Freedom Township, Minnesota (the United States)
- Coordinates: 43°58′51″N 93°42′26″W
- Country: United States
- State: Minnesota
- County: Waseca

Area
  - Total: 36.2 sq mi (93.7 km^{2})
  - Land: 35.9 sq mi (93.1 km^{2})
  - Water: 0.23 sq mi (0.6 km^{2})
- Elevation: 1,063 ft (324 m)

Population (2000)
  - Total: 397
  - Density: 11/sq mi (4.3/km^{2})
- Time zone: UTC-6 (Central (CST))
  - Summer (DST): UTC-5 (CDT)
- FIPS code: 27-22598
- GNIS feature ID: 0664225

Freedom Township is a township in Waseca County, Minnesota, United States. The population was 336 at the 2020 census.

Freedom Township was organized in 1858.

== Geography ==
According to the United States Census Bureau, the township has a total area of 36.2 square miles (94 km^{2}), of which 36.0 square miles (93 km^{2}) is land and 0.2 square miles (0.52 km^{2}) (0.64%) is water.

== Demographics ==
As of the census of 2000, there were 397 people, 147 households, and 120 families residing in the township. The population density was 11.0 inhabitants per square mile (4.2/km^{2}). There were 153 housing units at an average density of 4.3 per square mile (1.7/km^{2}). The racial makeup of the township was 99.24% White, and 0.76% from two or more races. Hispanic or Latino of any race were 1.01% of the population.

There were 147 households, out of which 34.7% had children under the age of 18 living with them, 76.2% were married couples living together, 3.4% had a female householder with no husband present, and 17.7% were non-families. 16.3% of all households were made up of individuals, and 9.5% had someone living alone who was 65 years of age or older. The average household size was 2.70 and the average family size was 3.03.

In the township the population was spread out, with 25.7% under the age of 18, 6.0% from 18 to 24, 28.0% from 25 to 44, 22.7% from 45 to 64, and 17.6% who were 65 years of age or older. The median age was 40 years. For every 100 females, there were 111.2 males. For every 100 females age 18 and over, there were 103.4 males.

The median income for a household in the township was $39,375, and the median income for a family was $43,929. Males had a median income of $30,179 versus $19,375 for females. The per capita income for the township was $14,678. About 1.9% of families and 4.4% of the population were below the poverty line, including 3.9% of those under age 18 and 7.0% of those age 65 or over.
