= Janesville Township, Waseca County, Minnesota =

Janesville Township, Minnesota
- Township
- Location within the state of Minnesota Janesville Township, Minnesota (the United States)
- Coordinates: 44°8′55″N 93°41′56″W
- Country: United States
- State: Minnesota
- County: Waseca

Area
  - Total: 34.7 sq mi (89.9 km^{2})
  - Land: 30.9 sq mi (80.1 km^{2})
  - Water: 3.8 sq mi (9.8 km^{2})
- Elevation: 1,030 ft (314 m)

Population (2000)
  - Total: 520
  - Density: 17/sq mi (6.5/km^{2})
- Time zone: UTC-6 (Central (CST))
  - Summer (DST): UTC-5 (CDT)
- ZIP code: 56048
- Area code: 507
- FIPS code: 27-31724
- GNIS feature ID: 0664573

Janesville Township is a township in Waseca County, Minnesota, United States. The population was 576 at the 2020 census.

== History ==
Janesville Township was organized in 1858, and named after its main settlement, Janesville. The township contains one property listed on the National Register of Historic Places, the Seha Sorghum Mill, established circa 1904.

== Geography ==
According to the United States Census Bureau, the township has a total area of 34.7 square miles (90 km^{2}), of which 30.9 square miles (80 km^{2}) is land and 3.8 square miles (9.8 km^{2}) (10.86%) is water.

== Demographics ==
As of the census of 2000, there were 520 people, 190 households, and 149 families residing in the township. The population density was 16.8 inhabitants per square mile (6.5/km^{2}). There were 200 housing units at an average density of 6.5 per square mile (2.5/km^{2}). The racial makeup of the township was 99.42% White, 0.19% Native American and 0.38% Asian.

There were 190 households, out of which 34.7% had children under the age of 18 living with them, 68.9% were married couples living together, 3.7% had a female householder with no husband present, and 21.1% were non-families. 18.9% of all households were made up of individuals, and 6.3% had someone living alone who was 65 years of age or older. The average household size was 2.74 and the average family size was 3.15.

In the township the population was spread out, with 26.0% under the age of 18, 11.3% from 18 to 24, 23.7% from 25 to 44, 28.3% from 45 to 64, and 10.8% who were 65 years of age or older. The median age was 39 years. For every 100 females, there were 113.1 males. For every 100 females age 18 and over, there were 113.9 males.

The median income for a household in the township was $45,667, and the median income for a family was $46,923. Males had a median income of $31,111 versus $25,500 for females. The per capita income for the township was $17,714. About 5.5% of families and 5.6% of the population were below the poverty line, including 10.1% of those under age 18 and none of those age 65 or over.
