= Eagle Lake, Minnesota =

Town in Minnesota, United States

Eagle Lake
- City
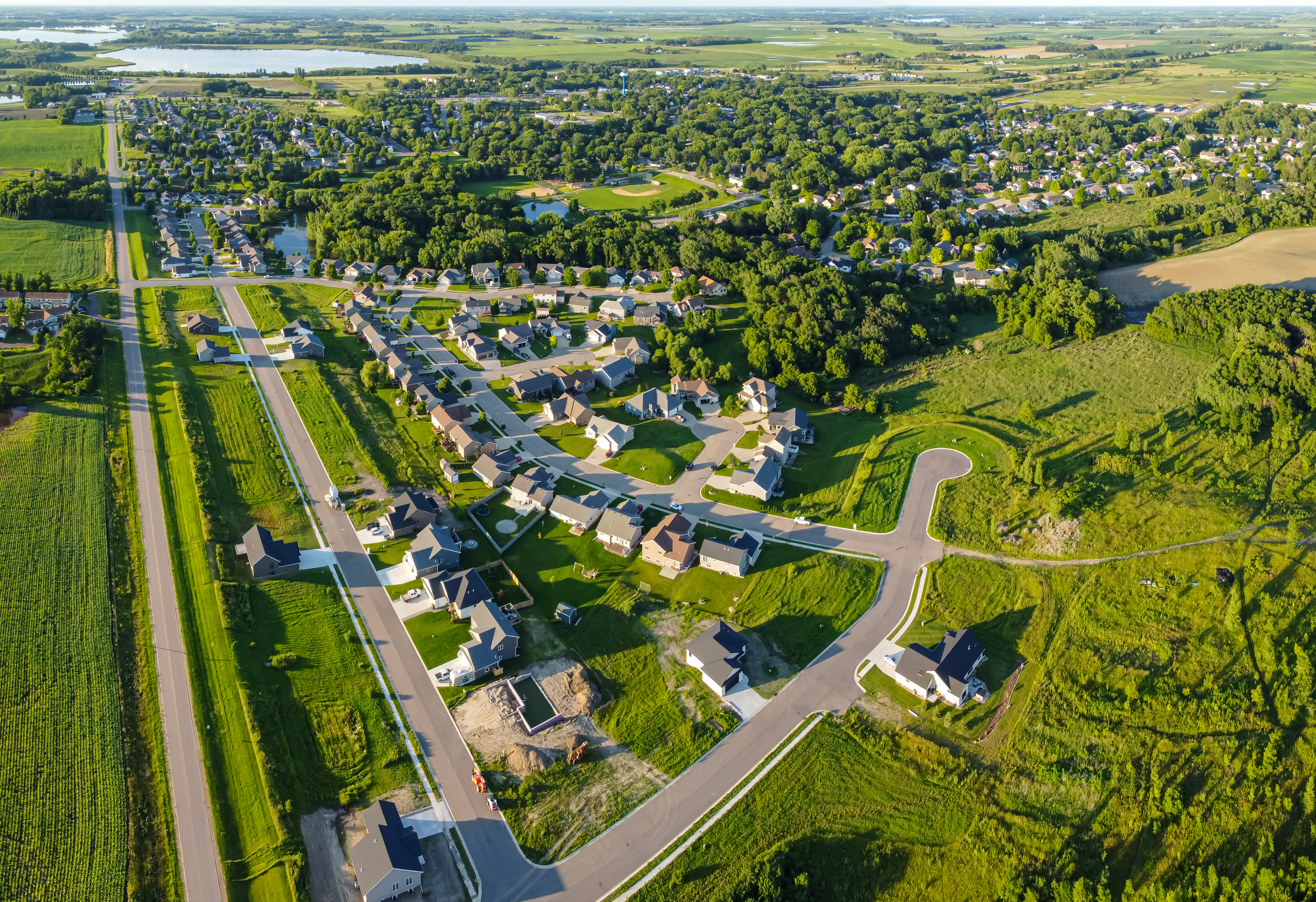
- US-14 run by north of town

- Location of Eagle Lake, Minnesota
- Coordinates: 44°09′49″N 93°52′56″W
- Country: United States
- State: Minnesota
- County: Blue Earth

Government
  - Type: Mayor - Council
  - Mayor: Tim Auringer

Area
  - Total: 1.93 sq mi (4.99 km^{2})
  - Land: 1.93 sq mi (4.99 km^{2})
  - Water: 0.0039 sq mi (0.01 km^{2})
- Elevation: 1,010 ft (310 m)

Population (2020)
  - Total: 3,278
  - Estimate (2021): 3,286
  - Density: 1,702.8/sq mi (657.44/km^{2})
- Time zone: UTC-6 (CST)
  - Summer (DST): UTC-5 (CDT)
- ZIP code: 56024
- Area code: 507
- FIPS code: 27-17378
- GNIS feature ID: 2394589
- Website: eaglelakemn.gov

Eagle Lake is in Blue Earth County, Minnesota, United States. The population was 3,278 at the 2020 census. It is part of the Mankato, MN Metropolitan Statistical Area.

U.S. Route 14 and Minnesota State Highway 60 are two of the main arterial routes in the community.

== History ==
A post office was established in the area in 1870 and the village was named Spier.The townsite was platted in 1872. It was not until 1873 the name changed to Eagle Lake. It was named after nearby Eagle Lake. A post office has been in operation in Eagle Lake since 1873.

== Geography ==
According to the United States Census Bureau, the city has an area of 1.61 square miles (4.17 km^{2}), all land.

== Demographics ==
Historical population
Census	Pop.	Note	%±
1910	231		—
1920	231		0.0%
1930	222		−3.9%
1940	269		21.2%
1950	310		15.2%
1960	506		63.2%
1970	839		65.8%
1980	1,470		75.2%
1990	1,703		15.9%
2000	1,787		4.9%
2010	2,422		35.5%
2020	3,278		35.3%
2021 (est.)	3,286		0.2%
U.S. Decennial Census; 2020 Census

=== 2020 census ===
As of the 2020 census, Eagle Lake had a population of 3,278. The median age was 32.5 years. 29.2% of residents were under the age of 18 and 9.1% of residents were 65 years of age or older. For every 100 females there were 95.4 males, and for every 100 females age 18 and over there were 96.6 males age 18 and over.

0.0% of residents lived in urban areas, while 100.0% lived in rural areas.

There were 1,203 households in Eagle Lake, of which 38.3% had children under the age of 18 living in them. Of all households, 52.3% were married-couple households, 15.3% were households with a male householder and no spouse or partner present, and 21.4% were households with a female householder and no spouse or partner present. About 20.3% of all households were made up of individuals and 4.8% had someone living alone who was 65 years of age or older.

There were 1,229 housing units, of which 2.1% were vacant. The homeowner vacancy rate was 1.1% and the rental vacancy rate was 1.7%.

Racial composition as of the 2020 census
Race	Number	Percent
White	2,921	89.1%
Black or African American	82	2.5%
American Indian and Alaska Native	10	0.3%
Asian	41	1.3%
Native Hawaiian and Other Pacific Islander	1	0.0%
Some other race	32	1.0%
Two or more races	191	5.8%
Hispanic or Latino (of any race)	120	3.7%

=== 2010 census ===
As of the 2010 census, the population was 2,422, with 887 households, and 650 families living in the city. The population density was 1,504.3 inhabitants per square mile (580.8/km^{2}). There were 931 housing units at an average density of 578.3 per square mile (223.3/km^{2}). The racial makeup of the city was 95.5% White, 1.4% African American, 0.3% Native American, 0.8% Asian, 0.6% from other races, and 1.5% from two or more races. Hispanic or Latino of any race were 2.8% of the population.

There were 887 households, of which 41.4% had children under the age of 18 living with them, 59.5% were married couples living together, 8.1% had a female householder with no husband present, 5.6% had a male householder with no wife present, and 26.7% were non-families. 18.9% of all households were made up of individuals, and 3.2% had someone living alone who was 65 or older. The average household size was 2.73 and the average family size was 3.13.

The median age in the city was 31.7. 28.7% of residents were under 18; 8.5% were between the ages of 18 and 24; 32.4% were from 25 to 44; 23.7% were from 45 to 64; and 6.6% were 65 or older. The gender makeup of the city was 50.5% male and 49.5% female.

=== 2000 census ===
As of the 2000 census, there were 1,787 people, 651 households, and 481 families living in the city. The population density was 1,485.0 inhabitants per square mile (573.4/km^{2}). There were 663 housing units at an average density of 551.0 per square mile (212.7/km^{2}). The racial makeup of the city was 96.98% White, 0.67% African American, 0.22% Native American, 0.56% Asian, 0.50% from other races, and 1.06% from two or more races. Hispanic or Latino of any race were 1.40% of the population.

There were 651 households, of which 45.9% had children under 18 living with them, 58.1% were married couples living together, 11.5% had a female householder with no husband present, and 26.0% were non-families. 19.4% of all households were made up of individuals, and 3.2% had someone living alone who was 65 or older. The average household size was 2.75 and the average family size was 3.17.

In the city, the population was spread out, with 31.8% under 18, 9.6% from 18 to 24, 35.1% from 25 to 44, 19.0% from 45 to 64, and 4.5% who were 65 or older. The median age was 30. For every 100 females, there were 104.7 males. For every 100 females 18 and over, there were 96.6 males.

The median income for a household in the city was $46,413, and the median income for a family was $54,167. Males had a median income of $33,313 versus $23,520 for females. The per capita income was $17,574. About 5.1% of families and 6.9% of the population were below the poverty line, including 7.1% of those under 18 and 7.7% of those 65 or older.

== Eagle Lake Tator Days ==
Every third weekend of July, Eagle Lake celebrates Tator Days. Events usually include a Miss Eagle Lake queen coronation on Thursday, a 5K run, a grand parade Saturday afternoon and a fundraising breakfast Sunday morning. The American Legion gives free french fries to those sporting Tator Days raffle buttons.
