= Alton Township, Waseca County, Minnesota =

Alton Township, Minnesota
- Township
- Location within the state of Minnesota Alton Township, Minnesota (the United States)
- Coordinates: 44°4′22″N 93°43′18″W
- Country: United States
- State: Minnesota
- County: Waseca

Area
  - Total: 36.2 sq mi (93.8 km^{2})
  - Land: 34.9 sq mi (90.3 km^{2})
  - Water: 1.4 sq mi (3.5 km^{2})
- Elevation: 1,050 ft (320 m)

Population (2000)
  - Total: 645
  - Density: 18/sq mi (7.1/km^{2})
- Time zone: UTC-6 (Central (CST))
  - Summer (DST): UTC-5 (CDT)
- FIPS code: 27-01198
- GNIS feature ID: 0663420

Alton Township (/ˈɔːltən/ AWL-tən) is a township in Waseca County, Minnesota, United States. The population was 412 at the 2020 census.

Alton Township was organized in 1866, and named after Alton, Illinois.

== Geography ==
According to the United States Census Bureau, the township has a total area of 36.2 square miles (94 km^{2}), of which 34.8 square miles (90 km^{2}) is land and 1.4 square miles (3.6 km^{2}) (3.78%) is water.

== Demographics ==
As of the census of 2000, there were 645 people, 173 households, and 130 families residing in the township. The population density was 18.5 inhabitants per square mile (7.1/km^{2}). There were 178 housing units at an average density of 5.1 per square mile (2.0/km^{2}). The racial makeup of the township was 89.77% White, 7.75% African American, 1.55% Native American, 0.47% Asian, and 0.47% from two or more races. Hispanic or Latino of any race were 1.71% of the population.

There were 173 households, out of which 37.6% had children under the age of 18 living with them, 69.4% were married couples living together, 1.7% had a female householder with no husband present, and 24.3% were non-families. 21.4% of all households were made up of individuals, and 9.8% had someone living alone who was 65 years of age or older. The average household size was 2.72 and the average family size was 3.18.

In the township the population was spread out, with 22.0% under the age of 18, 8.4% from 18 to 24, 37.8% from 25 to 44, 21.1% from 45 to 64, and 10.7% who were 65 years of age or older. The median age was 37 years. For every 100 females, there were 180.4 males. For every 100 females age 18 and over, there were 233.1 males.

The median income for a household in the township was $42,500, and the median income for a family was $50,625. Males had a median income of $22,500 versus $22,361 for females. The per capita income for the township was $15,413. About 4.8% of families and 5.9% of the population were below the poverty line, including 7.0% of those under age 18 and 5.6% of those age 65 or over.

== Notable person ==
- Rod Searle (1920-2014), former Speaker of the Minnesota House, resident of Alton Township from 1947 until his death.
