= Elections in Minnesota =

United States presidential election results for Minnesota
Year	Republican		Democratic		Third party(ies)	
Year	No.	%	No.	%	No.	%
1860	22,069	63.53%	11,920	34.31%	748	2.15%
1864	25,055	59.06%	17,367	40.94%	0	0.00%
1868	43,722	60.88%	28,096	39.12%	0	0.00%
1872	55,708	61.27%	35,211	38.73%	0	0.00%
1876	72,955	58.80%	48,587	39.16%	2,533	2.04%
1880	93,902	62.28%	53,315	35.36%	3,553	2.36%
1884	111,685	58.78%	70,065	36.87%	8,267	4.35%
1888	142,492	54.12%	104,385	39.65%	16,408	6.23%
1892	122,823	45.96%	100,920	37.76%	43,495	16.28%
1896	193,503	56.62%	139,735	40.89%	8,524	2.49%
1900	190,461	60.21%	112,901	35.69%	12,949	4.09%
1904	216,651	73.98%	55,187	18.84%	21,022	7.18%
1908	195,843	59.11%	109,401	33.02%	26,060	7.87%
1912	64,334	19.25%	106,426	31.84%	163,459	48.91%
1916	179,544	46.35%	179,152	46.25%	28,668	7.40%
1920	519,421	70.59%	142,994	19.43%	73,423	9.98%
1924	420,759	51.18%	55,913	6.80%	345,474	42.02%
1928	560,977	57.77%	396,451	40.83%	13,548	1.40%
1932	363,959	36.29%	600,806	59.91%	38,078	3.80%
1936	350,461	31.01%	698,811	61.84%	80,703	7.14%
1940	596,274	47.66%	644,196	51.49%	10,718	0.86%
1944	527,416	46.86%	589,864	52.41%	8,249	0.73%
1948	483,617	39.89%	692,966	57.16%	35,643	2.94%
1952	763,211	55.33%	608,458	44.11%	7,814	0.57%
1956	719,302	53.68%	617,525	46.08%	3,178	0.24%
1960	757,915	49.16%	779,933	50.58%	4,039	0.26%
1964	559,624	36.00%	991,117	63.76%	3,721	0.24%
1968	658,643	41.46%	857,738	54.00%	72,129	4.54%
1972	898,269	51.58%	802,346	46.07%	41,037	2.36%
1976	819,395	42.02%	1,070,440	54.90%	60,096	3.08%
1980	873,241	42.56%	954,174	46.50%	224,538	10.94%
1984	1,032,603	49.54%	1,036,364	49.72%	15,482	0.74%
1988	962,337	45.90%	1,109,471	52.91%	24,982	1.19%
1992	747,841	31.85%	1,020,997	43.48%	579,110	24.66%
1996	766,476	34.96%	1,120,438	51.10%	305,726	13.94%
2000	1,109,659	45.50%	1,168,266	47.91%	160,760	6.59%
2004	1,346,695	47.61%	1,445,014	51.09%	36,678	1.30%
2008	1,275,409	43.82%	1,573,354	54.06%	61,606	2.12%
2012	1,320,225	44.96%	1,546,167	52.65%	70,169	2.39%
2016	1,323,232	44.93%	1,367,825	46.44%	254,176	8.63%
2020	1,484,065	45.28%	1,717,077	52.40%	76,029	2.32%
2024	1,519,032	46.68%	1,656,979	50.92%	77,909	2.39%

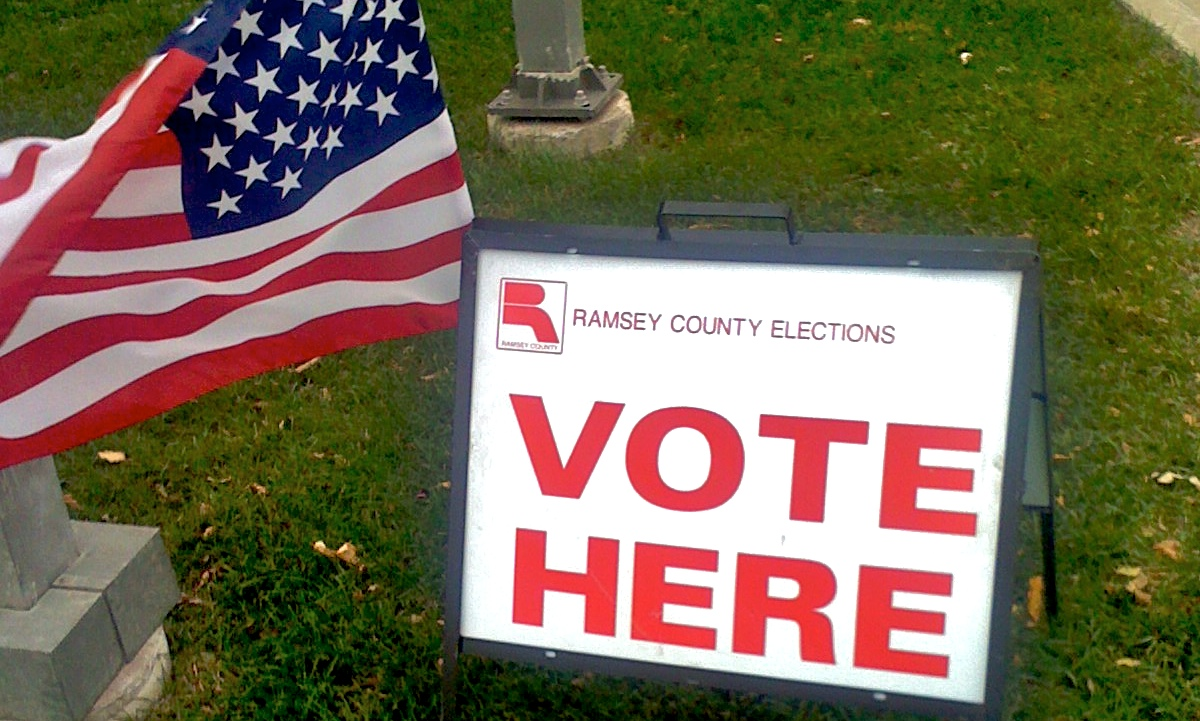
A polling place sign in 2007

Employees in Minnesota are allowed time off from work to vote on the morning of Election Day. Minnesota is also one of the first states to adopt same-day registration in the 1970s. Minnesota is known for a politically active citizenry. Minnesota has consistently high voter turnout, ranking highest or near-highest in recent elections. This is due in part to its same-day voter registration laws; previously unregistered voters can register on election day with evidence of residency.

In a 2020 study, Minnesota was ranked as the 15th easiest state for citizens to vote in.

== Minnesota State Canvassing Board ==
Recounts in Minnesota are handled by the State Canvassing Board, as needed in the 2008 Senate election between Norm Coleman and Al Franken, or the 1962 Minnesota gubernatorial election.

According to the Minnesota Statutes, "the state canvassing board shall consist of the secretary of state, two judges of the supreme court, and two judges of the district court selected by the secretary of state. None of the judges shall be a candidate at the election. If a judge fails to appear at the meeting of the canvassing board, the secretary of state shall fill the vacancy in membership by selecting another judge who is not a candidate at the election. Not more than two judges of the supreme court shall serve on the canvassing board at one time".

== See also ==
- 2026 Minnesota elections
- United States presidential elections in Minnesota
- Political party strength in Minnesota
