= United States presidential elections in Minnesota =

Presidential elections in Minnesota
- Number of elections: 42
- Voted Democratic: 21
- Voted Republican: 20
- Voted other: 1 (Note: Theodore Roosevelt, 1912.)
- Voted for winning candidate: 30
- Voted for losing candidate: 12

Following is a table of United States presidential elections in Minnesota, ordered by year. Since its admission to statehood on May 11, 1858, Minnesota has participated in every U.S. presidential election.

Winners of the state are in bold. The shading refers to the state winner, and not the national winner.

Minnesota is a signatory of the National Popular Vote Interstate Compact, an interstate compact in which signatories award all of their electoral votes to the winner of the national-level popular vote in a presidential election, even if another candidate won an individual signatory's popular vote. As of 2023, it has not yet gone into force.

== Elections from 1864 to present ==
View source data.

Year	Winner (nationally)	Votes	Percent	Runner-up (nationally)	Votes	Percent	Other national candidates (Note: For purposes of these lists, other national candidates are defined as those who won at least one electoral vote, or won at least ten percent of the vote in multiple states.)	Votes	Percent	Electoral votes
2024	Donald Trump	1,519,032	46.68	**Kamala Harris**	1,656,979	50.92	—			10
2020	**Joe Biden**	1,717,077	52.40	Donald Trump	1,484,065	45.28	—			10
2016	Donald Trump (Note: Won the electoral college while losing the popular vote)	1,323,232	44.93	**Hillary Clinton**	1,367,825	46.44	—			10
2012	**Barack Obama**	1,546,167	52.65	Mitt Romney	1,320,225	44.96	—			10
2008	**Barack Obama**	1,573,354	54.06	John McCain	1,275,409	43.82	—			10
2004	George W. Bush	1,346,695	47.61	**John Kerry**	1,445,014	51.09	—			10 (Note: Electoral vote split: 9 went to Kerry, 1 faithless elector went to Edwards)
2000	George W. Bush	1,109,659	45.50	**Al Gore**	1,168,266	47.91	—			10
1996	**Bill Clinton**	1,120,438	51.10	Bob Dole	766,476	34.96	Ross Perot	257,704	11.75	10
1992	**Bill Clinton**	1,020,997	43.48	George H. W. Bush	747,841	31.85	Ross Perot	562,506	23.96	10
1988	George H. W. Bush	962,337	45.90	**Michael Dukakis**	1,109,471	52.91	—			10
1984	Ronald Reagan	1,032,603	49.54	**Walter Mondale**	1,036,364	49.72	—			10
1980	Ronald Reagan	873,241	42.56	**Jimmy Carter**	954,174	46.50	John B. Anderson	174,990	8.53	10
1976	**Jimmy Carter**	1,070,440	54.90	Gerald Ford	819,395	42.02	—			10
1972	**Richard Nixon**	898,269	51.58	George McGovern	802,346	46.07	—			10
1968	Richard Nixon	658,643	41.46	**Hubert Humphrey**	857,738	54.00	George Wallace	68,931	4.34	10
1964	**Lyndon B. Johnson**	991,117	63.76	Barry Goldwater	559,624	36.00	—			10
1960	**John F. Kennedy**	779,933	50.58	Richard Nixon	757,915	49.16	—			11
1956	**Dwight D. Eisenhower**	719,302	53.68	Adlai Stevenson II	617,525	46.08	T. Coleman Andrews/ Unpledged Electors (Note: Was allied with a slate of unpledged electors in Louisiana, Mississippi and South Carolina)	-		11
1952	**Dwight D. Eisenhower**	763,211	55.33	Adlai Stevenson II	608,458	44.11	—			11
1948	**Harry S. Truman**	692,966	57.16	Thomas E. Dewey	483,617	39.89	Strom Thurmond	—	—	11
1944	**Franklin D. Roosevelt**	589,864	52.41	Thomas E. Dewey	527,416	46.86	—			11
1940	**Franklin D. Roosevelt**	644,196	51.49	Wendell Willkie	596,274	47.66	—			11
1936	**Franklin D. Roosevelt**	698,811	61.84	Alf Landon	350,461	31.01	—			11
1932	**Franklin D. Roosevelt**	600,806	59.91	Herbert Hoover	363,959	36.29	—			11
1928	**Herbert Hoover**	560,977	57.77	Al Smith	396,451	40.83	—			12
1924	**Calvin Coolidge**	420,759	51.18	John W. Davis	55,913	6.80	Robert M. La Follette	339,192	41.26	12
1920	**Warren G. Harding**	519,421	70.59	James M. Cox	142,994	19.43	Parley P. Christensen	—	—	12
1916	Woodrow Wilson	179,152	46.25	**Charles E. Hughes**	179,544	46.35	—			12
1912	Woodrow Wilson	106,426	31.84	**Theodore Roosevelt**	125,856	37.66	William H. Taft	64,334	19.25	12
1908	**William H. Taft**	195,843	59.11	William Jennings Bryan	109,401	33.02	—			11
1904	**Theodore Roosevelt**	216,651	73.98	Alton B. Parker	55,187	18.84	—			11
1900	**William McKinley**	190,461	60.21	William Jennings Bryan	112,901	35.69	—			9
1896	**William McKinley**	193,503	56.62	William Jennings Bryan	139,735	40.89	—			9
1892	Grover Cleveland	100,920	37.76	**Benjamin Harrison**	122,823	45.96	James B. Weaver	29,313	10.97	9
1888	**Benjamin Harrison**	142,492	54.12	Grover Cleveland	104,385	39.65	—			7
1884	Grover Cleveland	70,065	36.87	**James G. Blaine**	111,685	58.78	—			7
1880	**James A. Garfield**	93,902	62.28	Winfield S. Hancock	53,315	35.36	James B. Weaver	3,267	2.17	5
1876	**Rutherford B. Hayes**	72,955	58.80	Samuel J. Tilden	48,587	39.16	—			5
1872	**Ulysses S. Grant**	55,708	61.27	Horace Greeley	35,211	38.73	—			5
1868	**Ulysses S. Grant**	43,545	60.8	Horatio Seymour	28,075	39.2	—			4
1864	**Abraham Lincoln**	25,031	59.0	George B. McClellan	17,376	41.0	—			4

== Election of 1860 ==
The election of 1860 was a complex realigning election in which the breakdown of the previous two-party alignment culminated in four parties each competing for influence in different parts of the country. The result of the election, with the victory of an ardent opponent of slavery, spurred the secession of eleven states and brought about the American Civil War.

Year	Winner (nationally)	Votes	Percent	Runner-up (nationally)	Votes	Percent	Runner-up (nationally)	Votes	Percent	Runner-up (nationally)	Votes	Percent	Electoral votes
1860	**Abraham Lincoln**	22,069	63.4	Stephen A. Douglas	11,920	34.3	John C. Breckinridge	748	2.2	John Bell	50	0.1	4

== See also ==
- Elections in Minnesota
- Minnesota presidential primary
