= 1868 United States presidential election in Minnesota =

- November 3, 1868
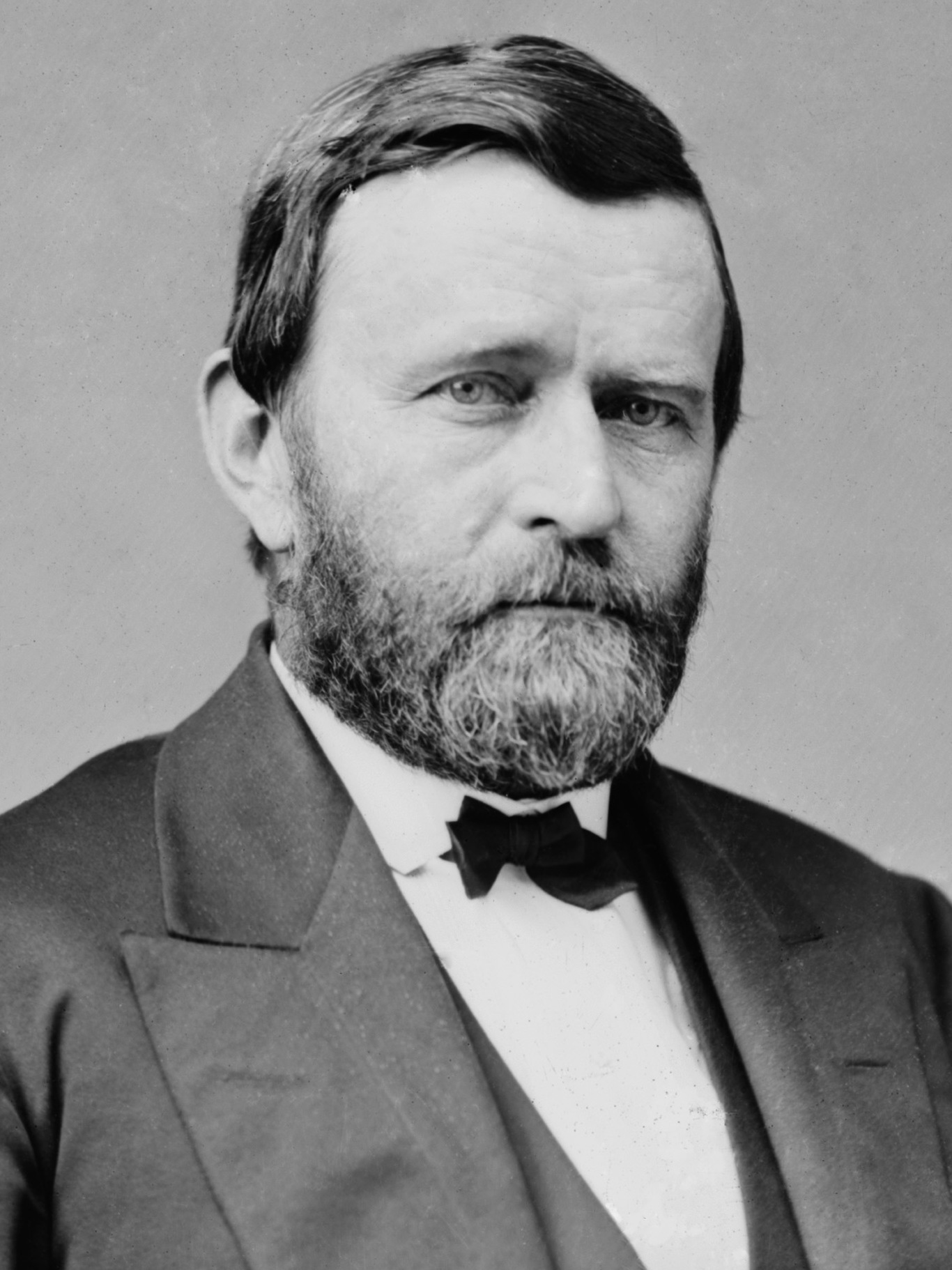

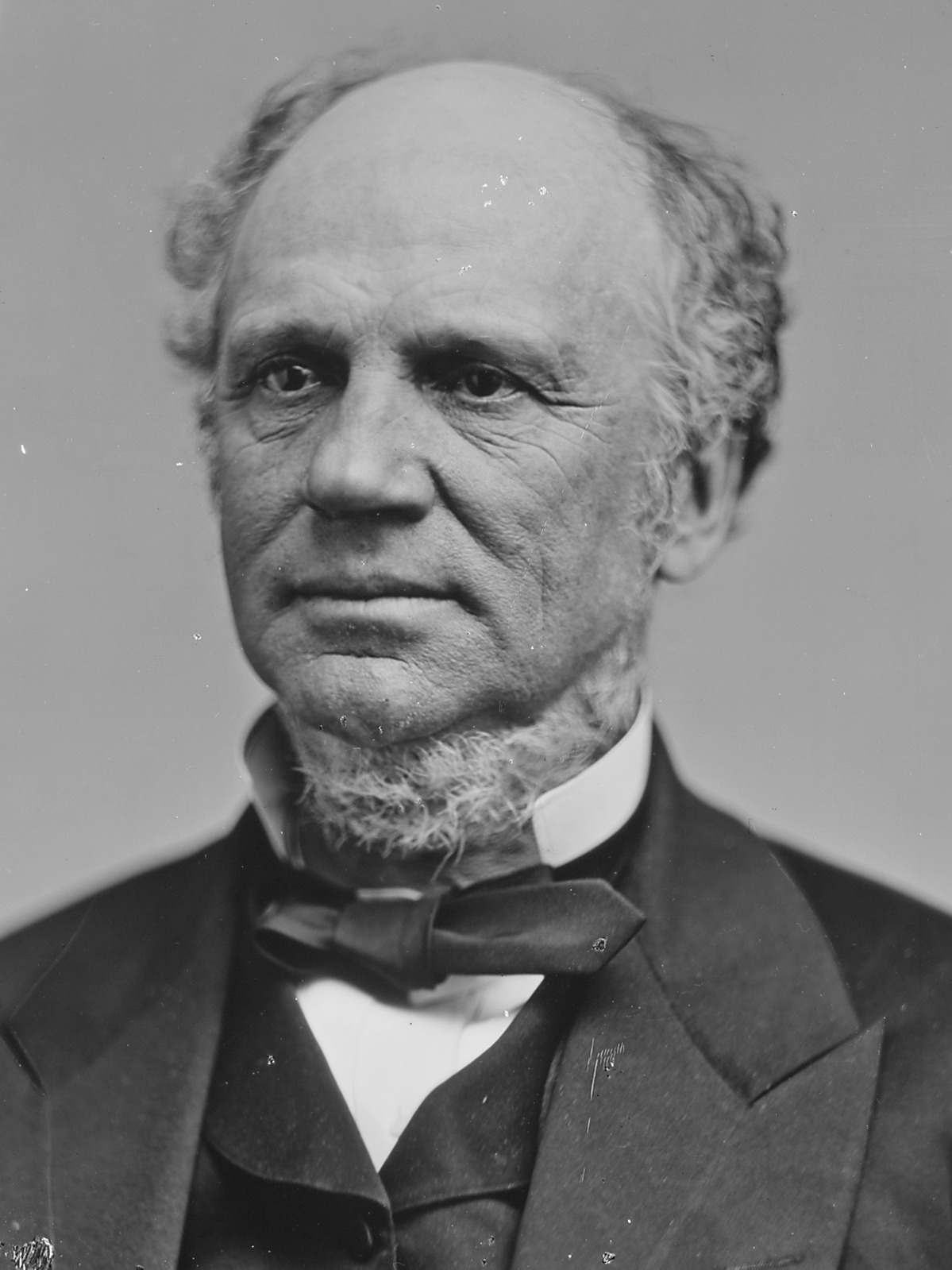
| Nominee | Ulysses S. Grant | Horatio Seymour |
| Party | Republican | Democratic |
| Home state | Illinois | New York |
| Running mate | Schuyler Colfax | Francis Preston Blair Jr. |
| Electoral vote | 4 | 0 |
| Popular vote | 43,719 | 28,096 |
| Percentage | 60.88% | 39.12% |
County results
Grant
50–60%
60–70%
70–80%
80–90%
90–100%
Seymour
50–60%
60–70%
70–80%
80–90%
Unknown/No Vote
President before election
Andrew Johnson
Democratic
Elected President
Ulysses S. Grant
Republican

The 1868 United States presidential election in Minnesota took place on November 3, 1868, as part of the 1868 United States presidential election. State voters chose four representatives, or electors, to the Electoral College, who voted for president and vice president.

Minnesota was won by Ulysses S. Grant, formerly the 6th Commanding General of the United States Army (R-Illinois), running with Speaker of the House Schuyler Colfax, with 60.88% of the popular vote, against the 18th governor of New York, Horatio Seymour (D–New York), running with former Senator Francis Preston Blair Jr., with 39.12% of the vote.

== Results ==
1868 United States presidential election in Minnesota
| Party | Candidate | Running mate | Popular vote | | Electoral vote | |
| Party | Candidate | Running mate | Count | % | Count | % |
|---|---|---|---|---|---|---|
| Republican | Ulysses S. Grant of Illinois | Schuyler Colfax of Indiana | 43,719 | 60.88% | 4 | 100.00% |
| Democratic | Horatio Seymour of New York | Francis Preston Blair Jr. of Missouri | 28,096 | 39.12% | 0 | 0.00% |
| Total | | | 71,815 | 100.00% | 4 | 100.00% |

=== Results by county ===
| County | Ulysses Grant Republican | | Horatio Seymour Democratic | | Margin | | Total votes cast |
| County | # | % | # | % | # | % | Total votes cast |
|---|---|---|---|---|---|---|---|
| Anoka | 424 | 58.73% | 298 | 41.27% | 126 | 17.45% | 722 |
| Benton | 153 | 51.00% | 147 | 49.00% | 6 | 2.00% | 300 |
| Blue Earth | 1,748 | 63.06% | 1,024 | 36.94% | 724 | 26.12% | 2,772 |
| Brown | 654 | 81.14% | 152 | 18.86% | 502 | 62.28% | 806 |
| Carlton | 26 | 100.00% | 0 | 0.00% | 26 | 100.00% | 26 |
| Carver | 799 | 44.91% | 980 | 55.09% | 181 | -10.17% | 1,779 |
| Chisago | 538 | 82.14% | 117 | 17.86% | 421 | 64.27% | 655 |
| Dakota | 1,612 | 47.34% | 1,793 | 52.66% | 181 | -5.32% | 3,405 |
| Dodge | 1,025 | 72.90% | 381 | 27.10% | 644 | 45.80% | 1,406 |
| Douglas | 562 | 84.13% | 106 | 15.87% | 456 | 68.26% | 668 |
| Faribault | 1,421 | 79.21% | 373 | 20.79% | 1,048 | 58.42% | 1,794 |
| Fillmore | 2,748 | 67.68% | 1,312 | 32.32% | 1,436 | 35.37% | 4,060 |
| Freeborn | 1,211 | 78.28% | 336 | 21.72% | 875 | 56.56% | 1,547 |
| Goodhue | 2,885 | 75.64% | 929 | 24.36% | 1,956 | 51.28% | 3,814 |
| Grant | 47 | 95.92% | 2 | 4.08% | 45 | 91.84% | 49 |
| Hennepin | 3,128 | 61.19% | 1,984 | 38.81% | 1,144 | 22.38% | 5,112 |
| Houston | 1,435 | 61.48% | 899 | 38.52% | 536 | 22.96% | 2,334 |
| Isanti | 263 | 90.07% | 29 | 9.93% | 234 | 80.14% | 292 |
| Jackson | 201 | 92.63% | 16 | 7.37% | 185 | 85.25% | 217 |
| Kanabec | 8 | 88.89% | 1 | 11.11% | 7 | 77.78% | 9 |
| Kandiyohi | 541 | 86.28% | 86 | 13.72% | 455 | 72.57% | 627 |
| Lake | 14 | 100.00% | 0 | 0.00% | 14 | 100.00% | 14 |
| Le Sueur | 876 | 44.44% | 1,095 | 55.56% | 219 | -11.11% | 1,971 |
| McLeod | 605 | 61.36% | 381 | 38.64% | 224 | 22.72% | 986 |
| Martin | 520 | 83.74% | 101 | 16.26% | 419 | 67.47% | 621 |
| Meeker | 600 | 67.80% | 285 | 32.20% | 315 | 35.59% | 885 |
| Mille Lacs | 118 | 74.21% | 41 | 25.79% | 77 | 48.43% | 159 |
| Morrison | 68 | 32.85% | 139 | 67.15% | 71 | -34.30% | 207 |
| Mower | 1,239 | 72.54% | 469 | 27.46% | 770 | 45.08% | 1,708 |
| Nicollet | 780 | 61.66% | 485 | 38.34% | 295 | 23.32% | 1,265 |
| Olmsted | 2,368 | 64.42% | 1,308 | 35.58% | 1,060 | 28.84% | 3,676 |
| Otter Tail | 105 | 82.68% | 22 | 17.32% | 83 | 65.35% | 127 |
| Pine | 35 | 87.50% | 5 | 12.50% | 30 | 75.00% | 40 |
| Pope | 311 | 83.38% | 62 | 16.62% | 249 | 66.76% | 373 |
| Ramsey | 1,669 | 46.39% | 1,929 | 53.61% | 260 | -7.23% | 3,598 |
| Redwood | 158 | 94.61% | 9 | 5.39% | 149 | 89.22% | 167 |
| Renville | 312 | 81.68% | 70 | 18.32% | 242 | 63.35% | 382 |
| Rice | 1,785 | 58.51% | 1,266 | 41.49% | 519 | 17.01% | 3,051 |
| St Louis | 66 | 76.74% | 20 | 23.26% | 46 | 53.49% | 86 |
| Scott | 478 | 24.75% | 1,453 | 75.25% | 975 | -50.49% | 1,931 |
| Sherburne | 205 | 58.07% | 148 | 41.93% | 57 | 16.15% | 353 |
| Sibley | 380 | 34.99% | 706 | 65.01% | 326 | -30.02% | 1,086 |
| Stearns | 1,029 | 40.31% | 1,524 | 59.69% | 495 | -19.39% | 2,553 |
| Steele | 1,137 | 69.33% | 503 | 30.67% | 634 | 38.66% | 1,640 |
| Todd | 161 | 82.14% | 35 | 17.86% | 126 | 64.29% | 196 |
| Wabasha | 1,831 | 61.59% | 1,142 | 38.41% | 689 | 23.18% | 2,973 |
| Waseca | 817 | 61.20% | 518 | 38.80% | 299 | 22.40% | 1,335 |
| Washington | 1,061 | 60.01% | 707 | 39.99% | 354 | 20.02% | 1,768 |
| Watonwan | 199 | 77.73% | 57 | 22.27% | 142 | 55.47% | 256 |
| Winona | 2,378 | 54.01% | 2,025 | 45.99% | 353 | 8.02% | 4,403 |
| Wright | 985 | 61.26% | 623 | 38.74% | 362 | 22.51% | 1,608 |
| Totals | 43,719 | 60.88% | 28,096 (Note: The individual county totals for Seymour sum to 28,093.) | 39.12% | 15,623 | 21.75% | 71,815 |

== See also ==
- United States presidential elections in Minnesota
