= 1900 United States presidential election in Minnesota =

- November 6, 1900
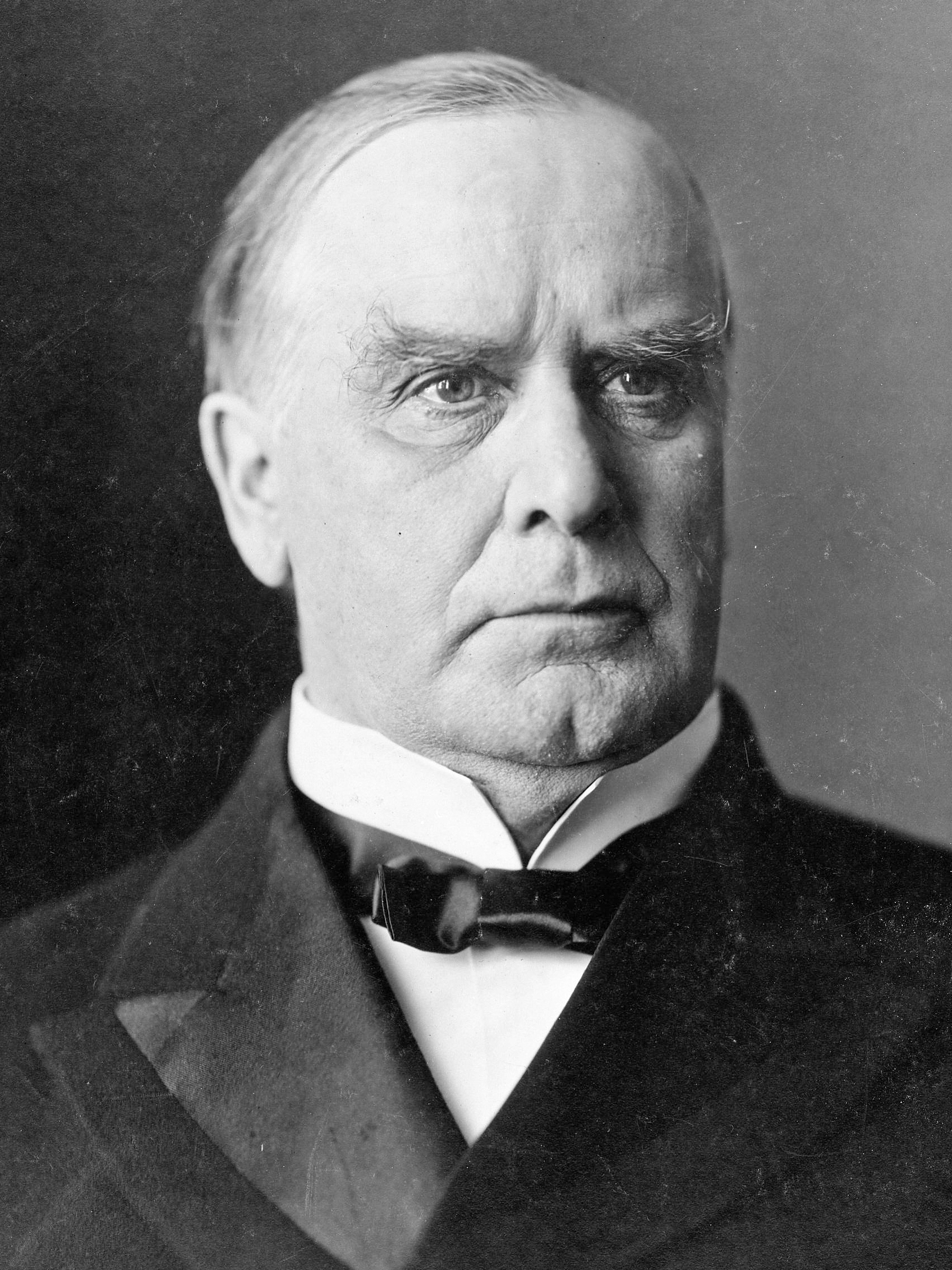

Nominee	William McKinley	William Jennings Bryan
Party	Republican	Democratic
Home state	Ohio	Nebraska
Running mate	Theodore Roosevelt	Adlai Stevenson I
Electoral vote	9	0
Popular vote	190,461	112,901
Percentage	60.21%	35.69%
County results
McKinley
40–50%
50–60%
60–70%
70–80%
80–90%
Bryan
40–50%
50–60%
60–70%
President before election
William McKinley
Republican
Elected President
William McKinley
Republican

The 1900 United States presidential election in Minnesota took place on November 6, 1900. All contemporary 45 states were part of the 1900 United States presidential election. State voters chose nine electors to the Electoral College, which selected the president and vice president.

Minnesota was won by the Republican nominees, incumbent President William McKinley of Ohio and his running mate Theodore Roosevelt of New York. They defeated the Democratic nominees, former U.S. Representative and 1896 Democratic presidential nominee William Jennings Bryan and his running mate, former Vice President Adlai Stevenson I. McKinley won the state by a margin of 24.52% in this rematch of the 1896 presidential election. The return of economic prosperity and recent victory in the Spanish–American War helped McKinley to score a decisive victory.

With 60.21 percent of the popular vote, Minnesota would be McKinley's fifth strongest victory in terms of percentage in the popular vote after Vermont, North Dakota, Maine and Pennsylvania.

Bryan had previously lost Minnesota to McKinley four years earlier and would later lose the state again in 1908 to William Howard Taft.

== Results ==
1900 United States presidential election in Minnesota
Party	Candidate	Votes	Percentage	Electoral votes
Republican	William McKinley (incumbent)	190,461	60.21%	9
Democratic/People's	William Jennings Bryan	112,901	35.69%	0
Prohibition	John G. Woolley	8,555	2.70%	0
Social Democratic	Eugene V. Debs	3,065	0.97%	0
Socialist Labor	Joseph F. Malloney	1,329	0.42%	0
Totals		316,311	100.00%	9
Voter turnout				—

=== Results by county ===
Counties carried by McKinley/Roosevelt
Counties carried by Bryan/Fairbanks

County	William McKinley Republican		William Jennings Bryan Democratic/People's		John Granville Woolley Prohibition		Eugene Victor Debs Social Democrat		Joseph Francis Maloney Socialist Labor		Margin		Total votes cast	
County	#	%	#	%	#	%	#	%	#	%	#	%	#	
Aitkin	988	77.31%	262	20.50%	17	1.33%	7	0.55%	4	0.31%	726	56.81%	1,278	AI
Anoka	1,511	70.87%	555	26.03%	48	2.25%	15	0.70%	3	0.14%	956	44.84%	2,132	AN
Becker	1,790	64.62%	771	27.83%	138	4.98%	52	1.88%	19	0.69%	1,019	36.79%	2,770	BK
Beltrami	1,339	62.05%	767	35.54%	18	0.83%	27	1.25%	7	0.32%	572	26.51%	2,158	BL
Benton	849	51.58%	751	45.63%	15	0.91%	25	1.52%	6	0.36%	98	5.95%	1,646	BN
Big Stone	1,081	59.27%	644	35.31%	89	4.88%	5	0.27%	5	0.27%	437	23.96%	1,824	BS
Blue Earth	3,647	58.68%	2,254	36.27%	230	3.70%	68	1.09%	16	0.26%	1,393	22.41%	6,215	BE
Brown	1,695	52.06%	1,471	45.18%	50	1.54%	35	1.07%	5	0.15%	224	6.88%	3,256	BR
Carlton	1,119	68.78%	467	28.70%	23	1.41%	14	0.86%	4	0.25%	652	40.07%	1,627	CT
Carver	1,775	59.54%	1,146	38.44%	34	1.14%	20	0.67%	6	0.20%	629	21.10%	2,981	CA
Cass	1,074	65.17%	518	31.43%	21	1.27%	29	1.76%	6	0.36%	556	33.74%	1,648	CS
Chippewa	1,432	63.70%	707	31.45%	67	2.98%	35	1.56%	7	0.31%	725	32.25%	2,248	CP
Chisago	2,354	83.36%	411	14.55%	26	0.92%	26	0.92%	7	0.25%	1,943	68.80%	2,824	CH
Clay	1,903	59.45%	1,165	36.39%	103	3.22%	26	0.81%	4	0.12%	738	23.06%	3,201	CY
Cook	81	52.60%	65	42.21%	6	3.90%	1	0.65%	1	0.65%	16	10.39%	154	CK
Cottonwood	1,368	68.50%	547	27.39%	73	3.66%	7	0.35%	2	0.10%	821	41.11%	1,997	CD
Crow Wing	1,803	67.23%	804	29.98%	45	1.68%	18	0.67%	12	0.45%	999	37.25%	2,682	CW
Dakota	1,904	47.64%	1,878	46.99%	143	3.58%	49	1.23%	23	0.58%	26	0.65%	3,997	DK
Dodge	1,611	65.06%	674	27.22%	181	7.31%	6	0.24%	4	0.16%	937	37.84%	2,476	DO
Douglas	1,917	59.87%	1,194	37.29%	75	2.34%	12	0.37%	4	0.12%	723	22.58%	3,202	DG
Faribault	2,910	70.61%	936	22.71%	245	5.95%	22	0.53%	8	0.19%	1,974	47.90%	4,121	FA
Fillmore	3,741	69.81%	1,364	25.45%	211	3.94%	34	0.63%	9	0.17%	2,377	44.36%	5,359	FI
Freeborn	2,934	74.17%	838	21.18%	171	4.32%	10	0.25%	3	0.08%	2,096	52.98%	3,956	FB
Goodhue	4,894	78.54%	1,125	18.05%	169	2.71%	26	0.42%	17	0.27%	3,769	60.49%	6,231	GH
Grant	1,062	65.76%	456	28.24%	73	4.52%	15	0.93%	9	0.56%	606	37.52%	1,615	GR
Hennepin	26,902	62.42%	14,498	33.64%	781	1.81%	631	1.46%	283	0.66%	12,404	28.78%	43,095	HN
Houston	1,765	64.58%	884	32.35%	72	2.63%	11	0.40%	1	0.04%	881	32.24%	2,733	HS
Hubbard	1,009	66.12%	464	30.41%	29	1.90%	20	1.31%	4	0.26%	545	35.71%	1,526	HU
Isanti	1,525	72.69%	504	24.02%	39	1.86%	21	1.00%	9	0.43%	1,021	48.67%	2,098	IS
Itasca	770	63.32%	413	33.96%	13	1.07%	9	0.74%	11	0.90%	357	29.36%	1,216	IT
Jackson	1,757	61.35%	993	34.67%	83	2.90%	24	0.84%	7	0.24%	764	26.68%	2,864	JK
Kanabec	658	73.44%	210	23.44%	11	1.23%	9	1.00%	8	0.89%	448	50.00%	896	KA
Kandiyohi	2,343	64.32%	1,204	33.05%	84	2.31%	8	0.22%	4	0.11%	1,139	31.27%	3,643	KD
Kittson	885	58.57%	562	37.19%	30	1.99%	22	1.46%	12	0.79%	323	21.38%	1,511	KI
Lac qui Parle	1,924	71.47%	642	23.85%	101	3.75%	19	0.71%	6	0.22%	1,282	47.62%	2,692	LQ
Lake	639	66.98%	278	29.14%	20	2.10%	8	0.84%	9	0.94%	361	37.84%	954	LK
Le Sueur	1,941	49.02%	1,858	46.92%	103	2.60%	45	1.14%	13	0.33%	83	2.10%	3,960	LS
Lincoln	866	59.64%	528	36.36%	50	3.44%	6	0.41%	2	0.14%	338	23.28%	1,452	LN
Lyon	1,844	64.61%	879	30.80%	111	3.89%	16	0.56%	4	0.14%	965	33.81%	2,854	LY
Marshall	1,457	59.66%	905	37.06%	70	2.87%	4	0.16%	6	0.25%	552	22.60%	2,442	MH
Martin	1,819	54.69%	1,233	37.07%	235	7.07%	31	0.93%	8	0.24%	586	17.62%	3,326	MT
McLeod	1,691	50.01%	1,540	45.55%	110	3.25%	31	0.92%	9	0.27%	151	4.47%	3,381	MD
Meeker	2,032	58.76%	1,300	37.59%	108	3.12%	12	0.35%	6	0.17%	732	21.17%	3,458	MK
Mille Lacs	1,072	71.42%	358	23.85%	56	3.73%	10	0.67%	5	0.33%	714	47.57%	1,501	ML
Morrison	1,880	49.25%	1,838	48.15%	63	1.65%	24	0.63%	12	0.31%	42	1.10%	3,817	MR
Mower	3,076	70.75%	1,081	24.86%	159	3.66%	25	0.57%	7	0.16%	1,995	45.88%	4,348	MO
Murray	1,358	60.68%	816	36.46%	51	2.28%	11	0.49%	2	0.09%	542	24.22%	2,238	MU
Nicollet	1,684	64.13%	858	32.67%	64	2.44%	14	0.53%	6	0.23%	826	31.45%	2,626	NI
Nobles	1,709	57.68%	1,101	37.16%	137	4.62%	14	0.47%	2	0.07%	608	20.52%	2,963	NO
Norman	1,492	53.57%	964	34.61%	287	10.31%	41	1.47%	1	0.04%	528	18.96%	2,785	NR
Olmsted	2,818	61.62%	1,597	34.92%	131	2.86%	21	0.46%	6	0.13%	1,221	26.70%	4,573	OL
Otter Tail	3,446	47.19%	3,257	44.60%	490	6.71%	56	0.77%	54	0.74%	189	2.59%	7,303	OT
Pine	1,121	59.06%	726	38.25%	23	1.21%	17	0.90%	11	0.58%	395	20.81%	1,898	PN
Pipestone	1,112	59.85%	692	37.24%	50	2.69%	4	0.22%	0	0.00%	420	22.60%	1,858	PS
Polk	2,863	49.62%	2,533	43.90%	161	2.79%	186	3.22%	27	0.47%	330	5.72%	5,770	PL
Pope	1,774	76.40%	481	20.71%	57	2.45%	5	0.22%	5	0.22%	1,293	55.68%	2,322	PO
Ramsey	15,384	56.26%	10,931	39.97%	449	1.64%	359	1.31%	222	0.81%	4,453	16.28%	27,345	RM
Red Lake	823	39.10%	1,165	55.34%	41	1.95%	67	3.18%	9	0.43%	-342	-16.25%	2,105	RL
Redwood	2,127	66.45%	918	28.68%	110	3.44%	34	1.06%	12	0.37%	1,209	37.77%	3,201	RW
Renville	2,809	64.77%	1,326	30.57%	146	3.37%	41	0.95%	15	0.35%	1,483	34.19%	4,337	RV
Rice	2,924	60.36%	1,688	34.85%	152	3.14%	70	1.45%	10	0.21%	1,236	25.52%	4,844	RC
Rock	1,234	65.19%	573	30.27%	73	3.86%	9	0.48%	4	0.21%	661	34.92%	1,893	RK
Roseau	632	53.02%	537	45.05%	18	1.51%	4	0.34%	1	0.08%	95	7.97%	1,192	RS
Scott	996	37.70%	1,588	60.11%	23	0.87%	26	0.98%	9	0.34%	-592	-22.41%	2,642	SL
Sherburne	931	68.46%	373	27.43%	49	3.60%	7	0.51%	0	0.00%	558	41.03%	1,360	SC
Sibley	1,736	56.24%	1,272	41.21%	45	1.46%	28	0.91%	6	0.19%	464	15.03%	3,087	SB
St. Louis	8,851	63.72%	4,667	33.60%	181	1.30%	82	0.59%	109	0.78%	4,184	30.12%	13,890	SY
Stearns	2,460	35.55%	4,244	61.33%	119	1.72%	62	0.90%	35	0.51%	-1,784	-25.78%	6,920	ST
Steele	1,833	58.32%	1,188	37.80%	107	3.40%	11	0.35%	4	0.13%	645	20.52%	3,143	SE
Stevens	1,036	58.01%	682	38.19%	50	2.80%	13	0.73%	5	0.28%	354	19.82%	1,786	SV
Swift	1,378	55.25%	1,028	41.22%	61	2.45%	20	0.80%	7	0.28%	350	14.03%	2,494	SW
Todd	2,212	56.28%	1,487	37.84%	192	4.89%	28	0.71%	11	0.28%	725	18.45%	3,930	TD
Traverse	768	50.29%	720	47.15%	30	1.96%	7	0.46%	2	0.13%	48	3.14%	1,527	TR
Wabasha	2,114	57.68%	1,406	38.36%	110	3.00%	20	0.55%	15	0.41%	708	19.32%	3,665	WB
Wadena	949	65.67%	448	31.00%	36	2.49%	11	0.76%	1	0.07%	501	34.67%	1,445	WD
Waseca	1,744	58.46%	1,155	38.72%	51	1.71%	27	0.91%	6	0.20%	589	19.75%	2,983	WC
Washington	2,984	68.49%	1,279	29.36%	47	1.08%	37	0.85%	10	0.23%	1,705	39.13%	4,357	WA
Watonwan	1,509	71.93%	509	24.26%	66	3.15%	10	0.48%	4	0.19%	1,000	47.66%	2,098	WW
Wilkin	812	52.05%	663	42.50%	51	3.27%	25	1.60%	9	0.58%	149	9.55%	1,560	WK
Winona	3,305	47.35%	3,436	49.23%	87	1.25%	62	0.89%	90	1.29%	-131	-1.88%	6,980	WN
Wright	3,153	60.72%	1,888	36.36%	100	1.93%	46	0.89%	6	0.12%	1,265	24.36%	5,193	WR
Yellow Medicine	1,743	65.95%	763	28.87%	111	4.20%	20	0.76%	6	0.23%	980	37.08%	2,643	YM
Totals	190,461	60.21%	112,901	35.69%	8,555	2.70%	3,065	0.97%	1,339	0.42%	77,560	24.52%	316,321	MN

== See also ==
- United States presidential elections in Minnesota
