= 1888 United States presidential election in Minnesota =

- November 6, 1888
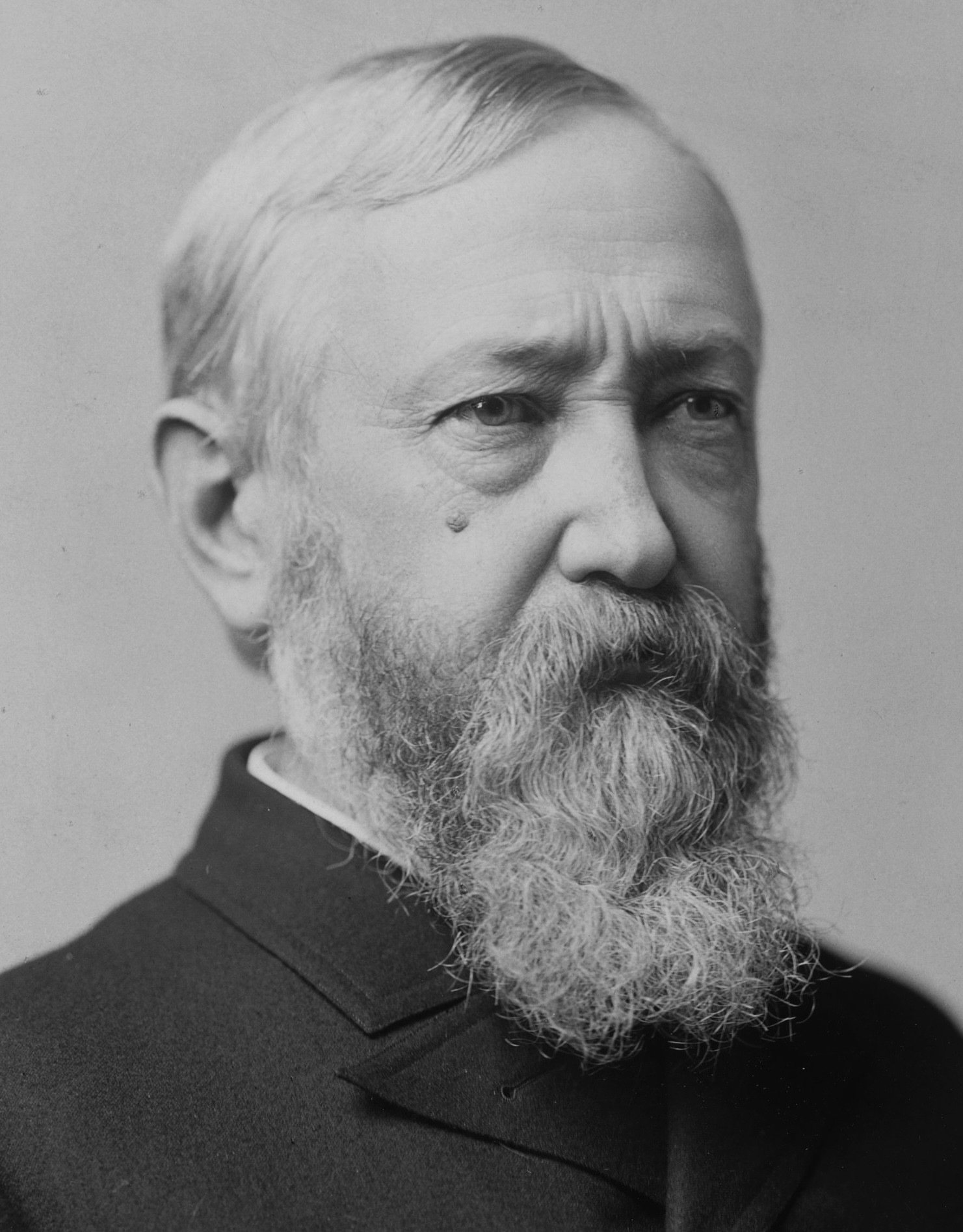

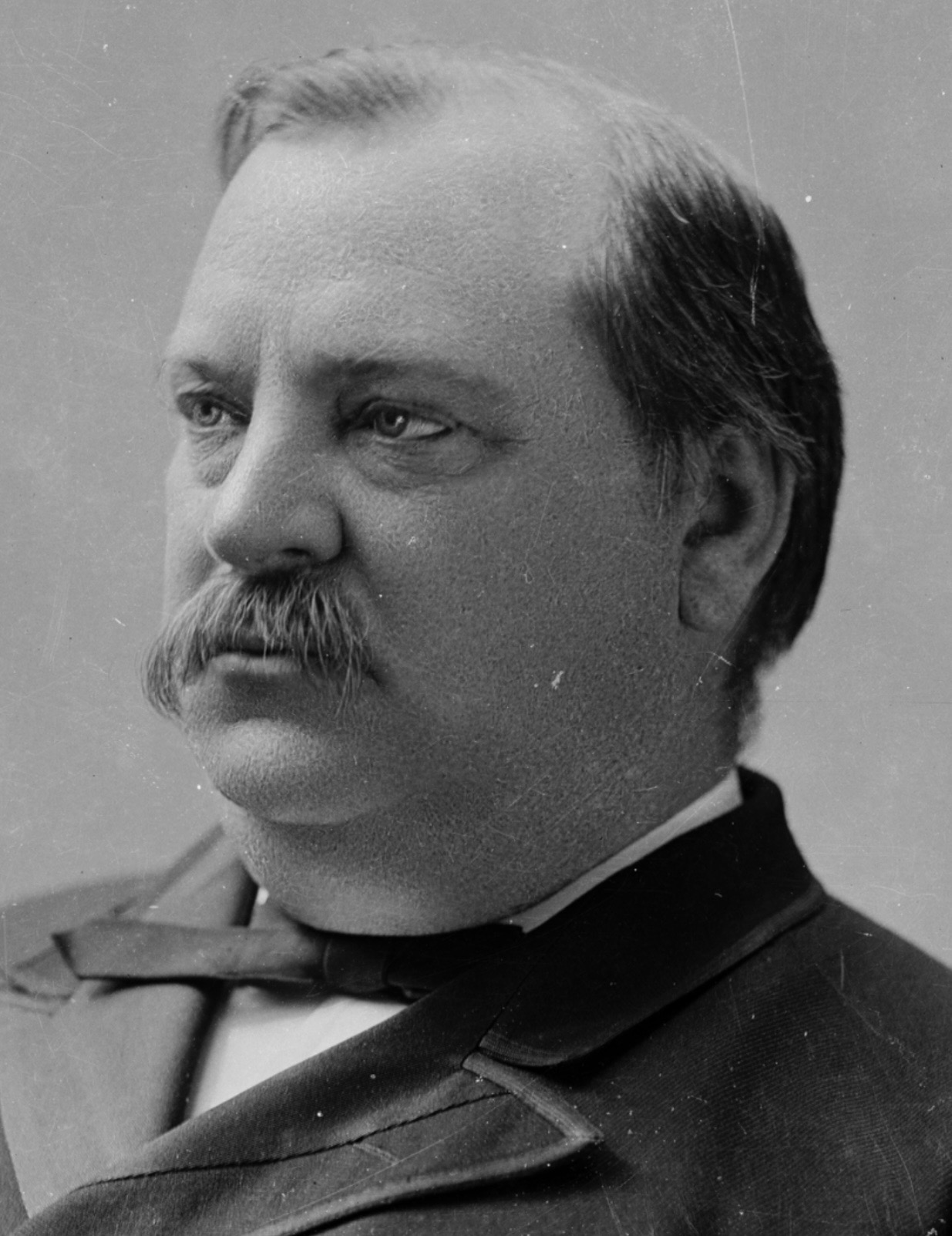

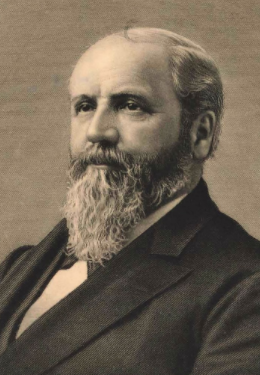
Nominee	Benjamin Harrison	Grover Cleveland	Clinton Fisk
Party	Republican	Democratic	Prohibition
Home state	Indiana	New York	New Jersey
Running mate	Levi P. Morton	Allen G. Thurman	John A. Brooks
Electoral vote	7	0	0
Popular vote	142,192	104,385	15,511
Percentage	54.12%	39.65%	5.82%
County results
Harrison
40–50%
50–60%
60–70%
70–80%
Cleveland
40–50%
50–60%
60–70%
70–80%
President before election
Grover Cleveland
Democratic
Elected President
Benjamin Harrison
Republican

The 1888 United States presidential election in Minnesota took place on November 6, 1888, as part of the 1888 United States presidential election. Voters chose seven representatives, or electors to the Electoral College, who voted for president and vice president.

Minnesota voted for the Republican nominee, Benjamin Harrison, over the Democratic nominee, incumbent President Grover Cleveland. Harrison won the state by a margin of 14.47%.

With 5.82% of the popular vote, Minnesota would be the Prohibition Party candidate Clinton B. Fisk’s strongest victory in terms of percentage in the popular vote.

== Results ==
1888 United States presidential election in Minnesota
Party	Candidate	Running mate	Popular vote		Electoral vote	
Party	Candidate	Running mate	Count	%	Count	%
Republican	Benjamin Harrison of Indiana	Levi Parsons Morton of New York	142,492	54.12%	7	100.00%
Democratic	Grover Cleveland of New York (incumbent)	Allen Granberry Thurman of Ohio	104,385	39.65%	0	0.00%
Prohibition	Clinton Bowen Fisk of New Jersey	John Anderson Brooks of Missouri	15,311	5.82%	0	0.00%
Union Labor	Alson Jenness Streeter of Illinois	Charles E. Cunningham of Arkansas	1,097	0.42%	0	0.00%
Total			263,285	100.00%	7	100.00%

== See also ==
- United States presidential elections in Minnesota
