= 1872 United States presidential election in Minnesota =

- November 5, 1872
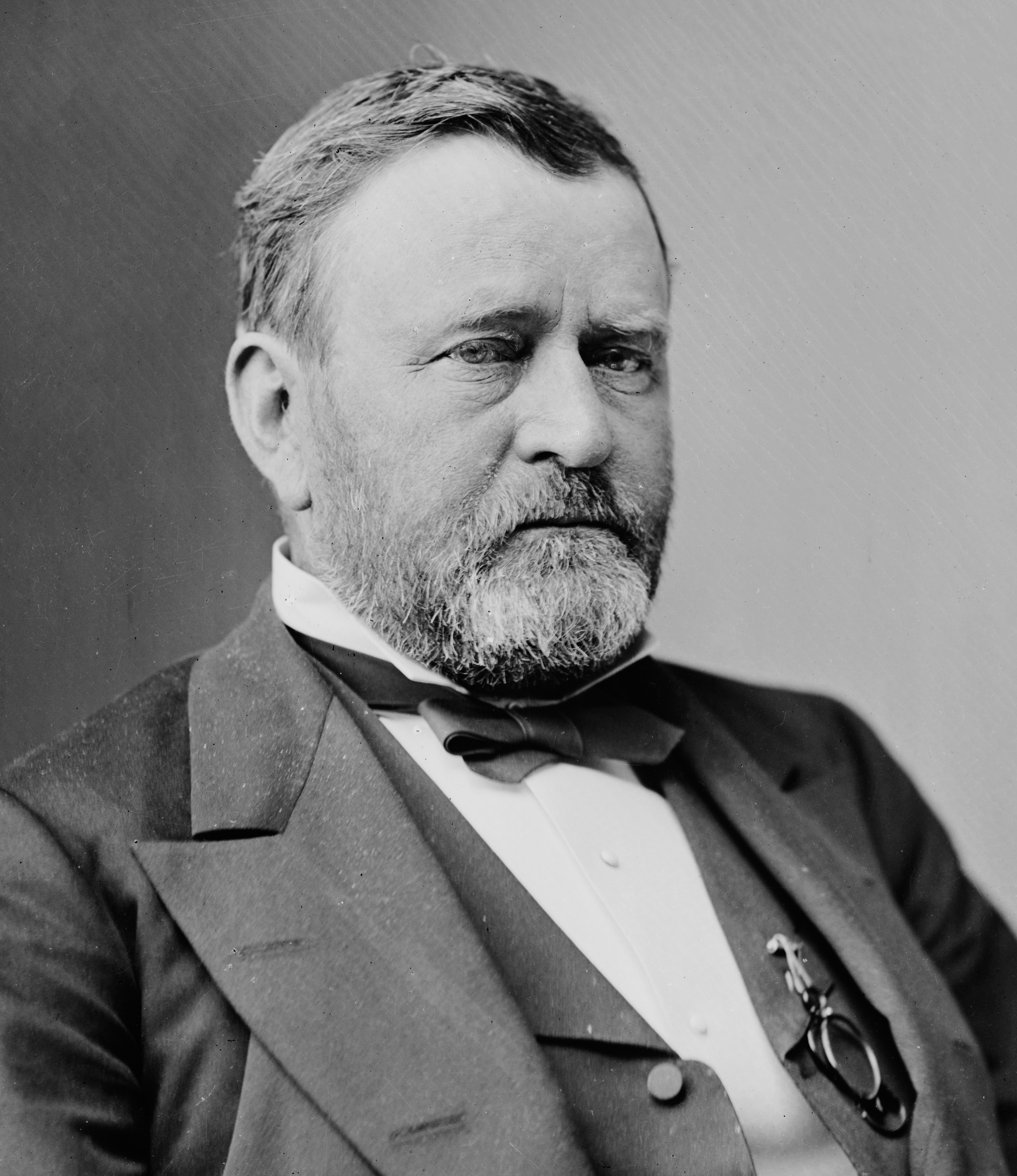

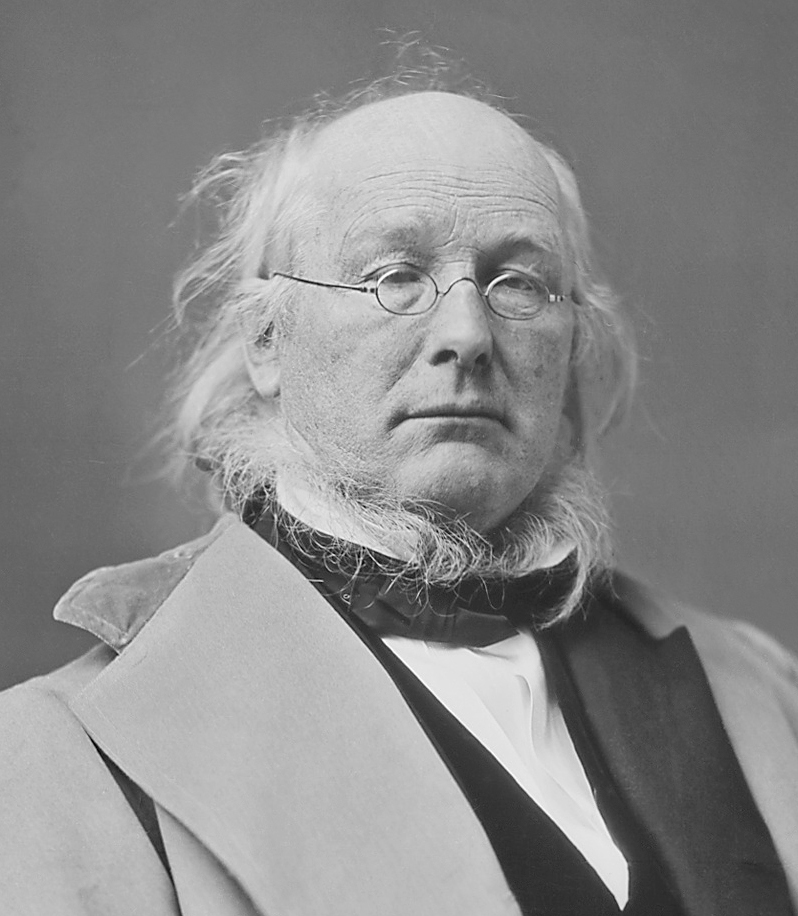
Nominee	Ulysses S. Grant	Horace Greeley
Party	Republican	Liberal Republican
Home state	Illinois	New York
Running mate	Henry Wilson	Benjamin G. Brown
Electoral vote	5	0
Popular vote	55,708	35,211
Percentage	61.27%	38.73%
County results
Grant
50–60%
60–70%
70–80%
80–90%
90–100%
Greeley
50–60%
60–70%
70–80%
Unknown/No Vote
President before election
Ulysses S. Grant
Republican
Elected President
Ulysses S. Grant
Republican

The 1872 United States presidential election in Minnesota took place on November 5, 1872, as part of the 1872 United States presidential election. Voters chose five representatives, or electors to the Electoral College, who voted for president and vice president.

Minnesota voted for the Republican candidate, Ulysses S. Grant, over Liberal Republican candidate, Horace Greeley. Grant won Minnesota by a margin of 22.54%.

== Results ==
1872 United States presidential election in Minnesota
Party	Candidate	Running mate	Popular vote		Electoral vote	
Party	Candidate	Running mate	Count	%	Count	%
Republican	Ulysses S. Grant of Illinois	Henry Wilson of Massachusetts	55,708	61.27%	5	100.00%
Liberal Republican	Horace Greely of New York	Benjamin Gratz Brown of Missouri	35,211	38.73%	0	0.00%
Total			90,919	100.00%	5	100.00%

== See also ==
- United States presidential elections in Minnesota
