= 1860 United States presidential election in Minnesota =

- November 6, 1860
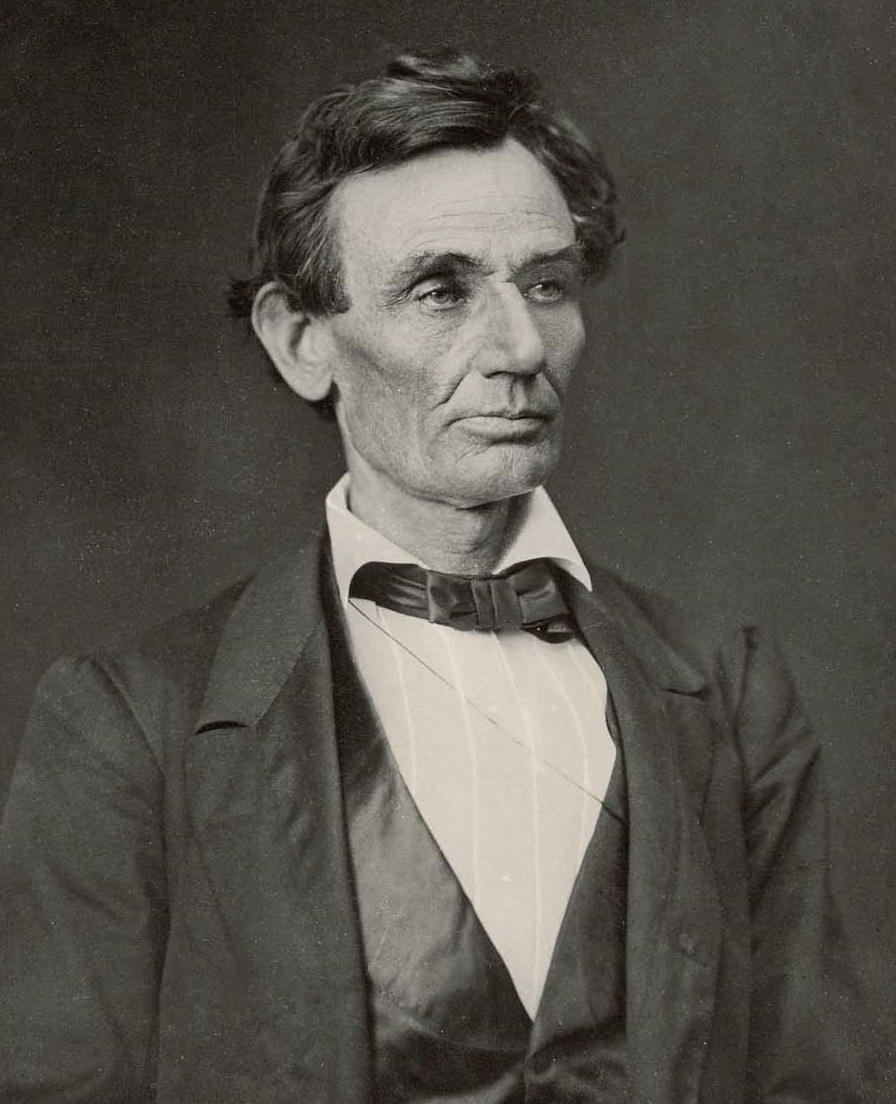

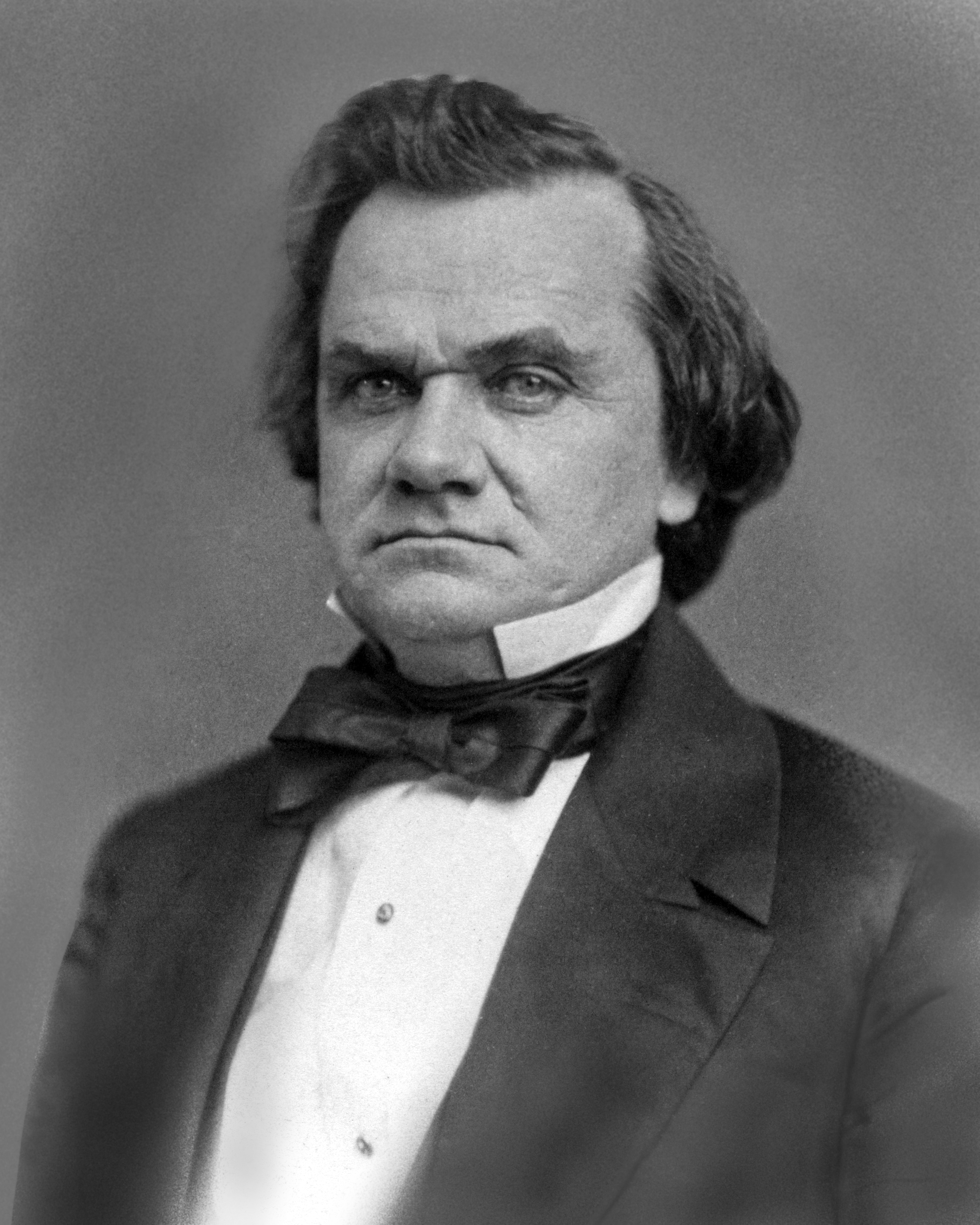
Nominee	Abraham Lincoln	Stephen A. Douglas
Party	Republican	Democratic
Home state	Illinois	Illinois
Running mate	Hannibal Hamlin	Herschel V. Johnson
Electoral vote	4	0
Popular vote	22,069	11,920
Percentage	63.44%	34.27%
County results
Lincoln
40–50%
50–60%
60–70%
70–80%
80–90%
90–100%
Douglas
50–60%
60–70%
Unknown/No Vote
President before election
James Buchanan
Democratic
Elected President
Abraham Lincoln
Republican

The 1860 United States presidential election in Minnesota took place on November 6, 1860, as part of the 1860 United States presidential election. Minnesota voters chose four representatives, or electors, to the Electoral College, who voted for president and vice president.

Minnesota voted in its first ever United States presidential election, having been admitted as the 32nd state on May 11, 1858. The state was won by Illinois Representative Abraham Lincoln (Republican Party (United States)), running with Senator Hannibal Hamlin, with 63.44% of the popular vote, against Senator Stephen A. Douglas (D–Illinois), running with 41st Governor of Georgia Herschel V. Johnson, with 34.27% of the popular vote.

With 63.44% of the popular vote, Lincoln's victory within the state would be his second strongest victory in terms of percentage in the popular vote in the 1860 election after Vermont. Minnesota would not vote Democratic until Franklin D. Roosevelt won it in 1932, 72 years later.

== Results ==
1860 United States presidential election in Minnesota
Party	Candidate	Votes	%
Republican	Abraham Lincoln	22,069	63.44%
Democratic	Stephen A. Douglas	11,920	34.27%
Southern Democratic	John C. Breckinridge	748	2.15%
Constitutional Union	John Bell	50	0.14%
Total votes		34,787	100%

=== Results by county ===
County	Abraham Lincoln Republican		Stephen Douglas Democratic		John C. Breckinridge Southern Democratic		John Bell Constitutional Union		Margin		Total votes cast
County	#	%	#	%	#	%	#	%	#	%	Total votes cast
Anoka	277	63.53%	150	34.40%	9	2.06%	0	0.00%	127	29.13%	436
Blue Earth	677	62.98%	374	34.79%	24	2.23%	0	0.00%	303	28.19%	1,075
Brown	408	80.16%	91	17.88%	10	1.96%	0	0.00%	317	62.28%	509
Carver	504	60.80%	324	39.08%	1	0.12%	0	0.00%	180	21.72%	829
Chisago	379	81.16%	64	13.70%	24	5.14%	0	0.00%	315	67.46%	467
Dakota	1,022	53.06%	882	45.79%	22	1.14%	0	0.00%	140	7.27%	1,926
Dodge	580	69.21%	205	24.46%	53	6.32%	0	0.00%	375	44.75%	838
Faribault	270	80.36%	63	18.75%	3	0.89%	0	0.00%	207	61.61%	336
Fillmore	1,610	65.90%	809	33.12%	24	0.98%	0	0.00%	801	32.78%	2,443
Freeborn	595	75.80%	188	23.95%	2	0.25%	0	0.00%	407	51.85%	785
Goodhue	1,352	75.19%	429	23.86%	17	0.95%	0	0.00%	923	51.33%	1,798
Hennepin	1,770	70.07%	705	27.91%	47	1.86%	4	0.16%	1,065	42.16%	2,526
Houston	594	48.73%	622	51.03%	3	0.25%	0	0.00%	-28	-2.30%	1,219
Isanti	41	85.42%	7	14.58%	0	0.00%	0	0.00%	34	70.84%	48
Kanabec	15	100.00%	0	0.00%	0	0.00%	0	0.00%	15	100.00%	15
Kandiyohi	13	81.25%	3	18.75%	0	0.00%	0	0.00%	10	62.50%	16
Le Sueur	566	50.04%	555	49.07%	9	0.80%	1	0.09%	11	0.97%	1,131
McLeod	240	74.77%	81	25.23%	0	0.00%	0	0.00%	159	49.54%	321
Martin	40	86.96%	6	13.04%	0	0.00%	0	0.00%	34	73.92%	46
Meeker	166	64.09%	83	32.05%	9	3.47%	1	0.39%	83	32.04%	259
Mille Lacs (Note: There is a conflict between the Minnesota Legislative Manual and ourcampaigns.com data: the latter shows Douglas receiving one vote.)	18	100.00%	0	0.00%	0	0.00%	0	0.00%	18	100.00%	18
Monongalia	42	71.19%	17	28.81%	0	0.00%	0	0.00%	35	42.38%	59
Morrison	53	35.33%	93	62.00%	4	2.67%	0	0.00%	-40	-26.67%	150
Mower	501	72.09%	194	27.91%	0	0.00%	0	0.00%	307	44.18%	695
Nicollet	461	59.25%	291	37.40%	25	3.21%	1	0.13%	170	21.85%	778
Olmsted	1,348	75.90%	404	22.75%	24	1.35%	0	0.00%	944	53.15%	1,776
Otter Tail	5	45.45%	6	54.45%	0	0.00%	0	0.00%	-1	-9.00%	11
Ramsey	1,234	49.36%	1,107	44.28%	143	5.72%	16	0.64%	127	5.08%	2,500
Renville	89	60.54%	41	27.89%	15	10.20%	2	1.36%	48	32.65%	147
Rice	996	66.09%	503	33.38%	8	0.53%	0	0.00%	493	32.71%	1,507
Saint Louis	40	58.22%	22	32.35%	6	8.82%	0	0.00%	18	25.87%	68
Scott	529	43.76%	642	53.10%	38	3.14%	0	0.00%	-113	-9.34%	1,209
Sherburne	120	66.67%	58	32.22%	2	1.11%	0	0.00%	62	34.45%	180
Sibley	397	49.69%	384	48.06%	18	2.25%	0	0.00%	13	1.63%	799
Stearns	438	47.00%	482	51.72%	12	1.29%	0	0.00%	-44	-4.72%	932
Steele	523	76.02%	157	22.82%	8	1.16%	0	0.00%	366	53.20%	688
Toombs	7	70.00%	3	30.00%	0	0.00%	0	0.00%	4	40.00%	10
Wabasha	1,231	63.29%	550	28.28%	150	7.71%	14	0.72%	681	35.01%	1,945
Waseca	304	68.01%	143	31.99%	0	0.00%	0	0.00%	164	36.02%	447
Washington	752	62.41%	422	35.02%	19	1.58%	12	1.00%	330	27.39%	1,205
Winona	1,209	68.02%	571	30.08%	36	1.90%	0	0.00%	1,816	37.94%	1,816
Wright	572	74.87%	188	24.61%	4	0.52%	0	0.00%	384	50.26%	764
Totals	22,069	63.44%	11,920	34.27%	748	2.15%	50	0.14%	10,149	29.17%	34,787

== See also ==
- United States presidential elections in Minnesota
