= 1896 United States presidential election in Minnesota =

- November 3, 1896

| Nominee | William McKinley | William Jennings Bryan |
| Party | Republican | Populist |
| Alliance | - | Democratic |
| Home state | Ohio | Nebraska |
| Running mate | Garret Hobart | Arthur Sewall |
| Electoral vote | 9 | 0 |
| Popular vote | 193,503 | 139,735 |
| Percentage | 56.62% | 40.89% |
County results
McKinley
40–50%
50–60%
60–70%
70–80%
80–90%
Bryan
40–50%
50–60%
60–70%
President before election
Grover Cleveland
Democratic
Elected President
William McKinley
Republican

The 1896 United States presidential election in Minnesota took place on November 3, 1896. All contemporary 45 states were part of the 1896 United States presidential election. State voters chose nine electors to the Electoral College, which selected the president and vice president.

Minnesota was won by the Republican nominees, former Ohio Governor William McKinley and his running mate Garret Hobart of New Jersey. They defeated the Democratic and Populist nominees, former Representative William Jennings Bryan and his running mate former Representative Thomas E. Watson. McKinley won the state by a margin of 15.73%.

Bryan would lose Minnesota to McKinley again four years later and would later lose the state again in 1908 to William Howard Taft.

== Results ==
1896 United States presidential election in Minnesota
| Party | Candidate | Votes | Percentage | Electoral votes |
|---|---|---|---|---|
| Republican | William McKinley | 193,503 | 56.62% | 9 |
| Democratic/People's | William Jennings Bryan | 139,735 | 40.89% | 0 |
| Prohibition | Joshua Levering | 4,348 | 1.27% | 0 |
| National Democratic | John M. Palmer | 3,222 | 0.94% | 0 |
| Socialist Labor | Charles H. Matchett | 954 | 0.28% | 0 |
| Totals | | 341,762 | 100.00% | 9 |
| Voter turnout | | | | — |

=== Results by county ===
Counties carried by McKinley/Hobart
Counties carried by Bryan/Sewall

| County | William McKinley Republican | | William Jennings Bryan Democratic/People's | | Joshua Levering Prohibition | | John M. Palmer National Democratic | | Charles H. Matchett Socialist Labor | | Margin | | Total votes cast | |
| County | # | % | # | % | # | % | # | % | # | % | # | % | # | |
|---|---|---|---|---|---|---|---|---|---|---|---|---|---|---|
| Aitkin | 855 | 69.46% | 344 | 27.94% | 17 | 1.38% | 9 | 0.73% | 6 | 0.49% | 511 | 41.51% | 1,231 | AI |
| Anoka | 1,553 | 64.90% | 791 | 33.05% | 24 | 1.00% | 24 | 1.00% | 1 | 0.04% | 762 | 31.84% | 2,393 | AN |
| Becker | 1,479 | 58.81% | 985 | 39.17% | 34 | 1.35% | 15 | 0.60% | 2 | 0.08% | 494 | 19.64% | 2,515 | BK |
| Beltrami | 202 | 47.98% | 213 | 50.59% | 3 | 0.71% | 3 | 0.71% | 0 | 0.00% | -11 | -2.61% | 421 | BL |
| Benton | 778 | 46.61% | 867 | 51.95% | 8 | 0.48% | 14 | 0.84% | 2 | 0.12% | -89 | -5.33% | 1,669 | BN |
| Big Stone | 1,048 | 55.72% | 742 | 39.45% | 54 | 2.87% | 31 | 1.65% | 6 | 0.32% | 306 | 16.27% | 1,881 | BS |
| Blue Earth | 4,055 | 57.50% | 2,744 | 38.91% | 150 | 2.13% | 93 | 1.32% | 10 | 0.14% | 1,311 | 18.59% | 7,052 | BE |
| Brown | 1,807 | 53.41% | 1,469 | 43.42% | 42 | 1.24% | 50 | 1.48% | 15 | 0.44% | 338 | 9.99% | 3,383 | BR |
| Carlton | 1,169 | 67.15% | 543 | 31.19% | 10 | 0.57% | 13 | 0.75% | 6 | 0.34% | 626 | 35.96% | 1,741 | CT |
| Carver | 1,856 | 58.25% | 1,268 | 39.80% | 13 | 0.41% | 44 | 1.38% | 5 | 0.16% | 588 | 18.46% | 3,186 | CA |
| Cass | 351 | 55.63% | 271 | 42.95% | 5 | 0.79% | 2 | 0.32% | 2 | 0.32% | 80 | 12.68% | 631 | CS |
| Chippewa | 1,310 | 54.61% | 1,037 | 43.23% | 33 | 1.38% | 11 | 0.46% | 8 | 0.33% | 273 | 11.38% | 2,399 | CP |
| Chisago | 2,558 | 84.37% | 437 | 14.41% | 18 | 0.59% | 17 | 0.56% | 2 | 0.07% | 2,121 | 69.95% | 3,032 | CH |
| Clay | 1,598 | 44.44% | 1,908 | 53.06% | 43 | 1.20% | 38 | 1.06% | 9 | 0.25% | -310 | -8.62% | 3,596 | CY |
| Cook | 81 | 42.19% | 107 | 55.73% | 3 | 1.56% | 1 | 0.52% | 0 | 0.00% | -26 | -13.54% | 192 | CK |
| Cottonwood | 1,242 | 58.72% | 810 | 38.30% | 47 | 2.22% | 16 | 0.76% | 0 | 0.00% | 432 | 20.43% | 2,115 | CD |
| Crow Wing | 1,701 | 59.35% | 1,066 | 37.19% | 59 | 2.06% | 29 | 1.01% | 11 | 0.38% | 635 | 22.16% | 2,866 | CW |
| Dakota | 2,147 | 46.41% | 2,310 | 49.94% | 90 | 1.95% | 57 | 1.23% | 22 | 0.48% | -163 | -3.52% | 4,626 | DK |
| Dodge | 1,900 | 65.09% | 911 | 31.21% | 86 | 2.95% | 18 | 0.62% | 4 | 0.14% | 989 | 33.88% | 2,919 | DO |
| Douglas | 1,966 | 57.84% | 1,350 | 39.72% | 58 | 1.71% | 18 | 0.53% | 7 | 0.21% | 616 | 18.12% | 3,399 | DG |
| Faribault | 3,116 | 71.37% | 1,107 | 25.36% | 82 | 1.88% | 59 | 1.35% | 2 | 0.05% | 2,009 | 46.01% | 4,366 | FA |
| Fillmore | 4,195 | 66.05% | 1,939 | 30.53% | 167 | 2.63% | 40 | 0.63% | 10 | 0.16% | 2,256 | 35.52% | 6,351 | FI |
| Freeborn | 3,400 | 72.25% | 1,179 | 25.05% | 99 | 2.10% | 26 | 0.55% | 2 | 0.04% | 2,221 | 47.20% | 4,706 | FB |
| Goodhue | 5,748 | 77.87% | 1,426 | 19.32% | 118 | 1.60% | 78 | 1.06% | 12 | 0.16% | 4,322 | 58.55% | 7,382 | GH |
| Grant | 1,002 | 56.29% | 739 | 41.52% | 25 | 1.40% | 9 | 0.51% | 5 | 0.28% | 263 | 14.78% | 1,780 | GR |
| Hennepin | 26,786 | 55.47% | 20,515 | 42.48% | 450 | 0.93% | 291 | 0.60% | 246 | 0.51% | 6,271 | 12.99% | 48,288 | HN |
| Houston | 2,087 | 65.92% | 991 | 31.30% | 47 | 1.48% | 37 | 1.17% | 4 | 0.13% | 1,096 | 34.62% | 3,166 | HS |
| Hubbard | 364 | 49.73% | 344 | 46.99% | 4 | 0.55% | 19 | 2.60% | 1 | 0.14% | 20 | 2.73% | 732 | HU |
| Isanti | 1,490 | 66.52% | 750 | 33.48% | 0 | 0.00% | 0 | 0.00% | 0 | 0.00% | 740 | 33.04% | 2,240 | IS |
| Itasca | 826 | 52.91% | 724 | 46.38% | 5 | 0.32% | 3 | 0.19% | 3 | 0.19% | 102 | 6.53% | 1,561 | IT |
| Jackson | 1,558 | 56.51% | 1,150 | 41.71% | 29 | 1.05% | 17 | 0.62% | 3 | 0.11% | 408 | 14.80% | 2,757 | JK |
| Kanabec | 484 | 64.11% | 256 | 33.91% | 10 | 1.32% | 5 | 0.66% | 0 | 0.00% | 228 | 30.20% | 755 | KA |
| Kandiyohi | 2,181 | 56.25% | 1,638 | 42.25% | 38 | 0.98% | 17 | 0.44% | 3 | 0.08% | 543 | 14.01% | 3,877 | KD |
| Kittson | 753 | 48.36% | 762 | 48.94% | 23 | 1.48% | 13 | 0.83% | 6 | 0.39% | -9 | -0.58% | 1,557 | KI |
| Lac qui Parle | 1,620 | 61.34% | 932 | 35.29% | 57 | 2.16% | 21 | 0.80% | 11 | 0.42% | 688 | 26.05% | 2,641 | LQ |
| Lake | 595 | 64.05% | 320 | 34.45% | 6 | 0.65% | 5 | 0.54% | 3 | 0.32% | 275 | 29.60% | 929 | LK |
| Le Sueur | 2,235 | 51.16% | 2,003 | 45.85% | 65 | 1.49% | 54 | 1.24% | 12 | 0.27% | 232 | 5.31% | 4,369 | LS |
| Lincoln | 674 | 46.90% | 703 | 48.92% | 31 | 2.16% | 28 | 1.95% | 1 | 0.07% | -29 | -2.02% | 1,437 | LN |
| Lyon | 1,623 | 52.83% | 1,351 | 43.98% | 67 | 2.18% | 22 | 0.72% | 9 | 0.29% | 272 | 8.85% | 3,072 | LY |
| Marshall | 1,200 | 48.94% | 1,222 | 49.84% | 15 | 0.61% | 11 | 0.45% | 4 | 0.16% | -22 | -0.90% | 2,452 | MH |
| Martin | 1,739 | 54.31% | 1,327 | 41.44% | 97 | 3.03% | 30 | 0.94% | 9 | 0.28% | 412 | 12.87% | 3,202 | MT |
| McLeod | 1,595 | 47.73% | 1,653 | 49.46% | 43 | 1.29% | 47 | 1.41% | 4 | 0.12% | -58 | -1.74% | 3,342 | MD |
| Meeker | 2,094 | 56.32% | 1,538 | 41.37% | 51 | 1.37% | 23 | 0.62% | 12 | 0.32% | 556 | 14.95% | 3,718 | MK |
| Mille Lacs | 977 | 66.78% | 456 | 31.17% | 13 | 0.89% | 13 | 0.89% | 4 | 0.27% | 521 | 35.61% | 1,463 | ML |
| Morrison | 1,960 | 51.77% | 1,734 | 45.80% | 51 | 1.35% | 33 | 0.87% | 8 | 0.21% | 226 | 5.97% | 3,786 | MR |
| Mower | 3,379 | 68.83% | 1,407 | 28.66% | 85 | 1.73% | 36 | 0.73% | 2 | 0.04% | 1,972 | 40.17% | 4,909 | MO |
| Murray | 1,204 | 52.26% | 1,054 | 45.75% | 21 | 0.91% | 22 | 0.95% | 3 | 0.13% | 150 | 6.51% | 2,304 | MU |
| Nicollet | 1,803 | 66.41% | 837 | 30.83% | 32 | 1.18% | 42 | 1.55% | 1 | 0.04% | 966 | 35.58% | 2,715 | NI |
| Nobles | 1,568 | 54.84% | 1,204 | 42.11% | 48 | 1.68% | 32 | 1.12% | 7 | 0.24% | 364 | 12.73% | 2,859 | NO |
| Norman | 1,382 | 49.61% | 1,304 | 46.81% | 83 | 2.98% | 12 | 0.43% | 5 | 0.18% | 78 | 2.80% | 2,786 | NR |
| Olmsted | 3,201 | 62.83% | 1,741 | 34.17% | 83 | 1.63% | 66 | 1.30% | 4 | 0.08% | 1,460 | 28.66% | 5,095 | OL |
| Otter Tail | 3,544 | 42.73% | 4,482 | 54.04% | 162 | 1.95% | 76 | 0.92% | 30 | 0.36% | -938 | -11.31% | 8,294 | OT |
| Pine | 1,152 | 55.46% | 875 | 42.13% | 13 | 0.63% | 30 | 1.44% | 7 | 0.34% | 277 | 13.34% | 2,077 | PN |
| Pipestone | 862 | 47.49% | 919 | 50.63% | 17 | 0.94% | 17 | 0.94% | 0 | 0.00% | -57 | -3.14% | 1,815 | PS |
| Polk | 2,855 | 35.39% | 5,054 | 62.65% | 69 | 0.86% | 54 | 0.67% | 35 | 0.43% | -2,199 | -27.26% | 8,067 | PL |
| Pope | 1,773 | 70.53% | 688 | 27.37% | 43 | 1.71% | 8 | 0.32% | 2 | 0.08% | 1,085 | 43.16% | 2,514 | PO |
| Ramsey | 17,522 | 57.66% | 12,048 | 39.65% | 177 | 0.58% | 433 | 1.42% | 207 | 0.68% | 5,474 | 18.01% | 30,387 | RM |
| Redwood | 1,818 | 60.60% | 1,123 | 37.43% | 31 | 1.03% | 24 | 0.80% | 4 | 0.13% | 695 | 23.17% | 3,000 | RW |
| Renville | 2,553 | 55.16% | 1,978 | 42.74% | 51 | 1.10% | 38 | 0.82% | 8 | 0.17% | 575 | 12.42% | 4,628 | RV |
| Rice | 3,483 | 60.99% | 2,002 | 35.06% | 103 | 1.80% | 110 | 1.93% | 13 | 0.23% | 1,481 | 25.93% | 5,711 | RC |
| Rock | 1,209 | 59.85% | 765 | 37.87% | 28 | 1.39% | 15 | 0.74% | 3 | 0.15% | 444 | 21.98% | 2,020 | RK |
| Roseau | 287 | 34.66% | 527 | 63.65% | 6 | 0.72% | 5 | 0.60% | 3 | 0.36% | -240 | -28.99% | 828 | RS |
| Scott | 1,126 | 38.31% | 1,706 | 58.05% | 29 | 0.99% | 67 | 2.28% | 11 | 0.37% | -580 | -19.73% | 2,939 | SL |
| Sherburne | 1,008 | 63.92% | 536 | 33.99% | 18 | 1.14% | 13 | 0.82% | 2 | 0.13% | 472 | 29.93% | 1,577 | SC |
| Sibley | 1,826 | 57.97% | 1,251 | 39.71% | 19 | 0.60% | 47 | 1.49% | 7 | 0.22% | 575 | 18.25% | 3,150 | SB |
| St. Louis | 9,810 | 56.36% | 7,412 | 42.58% | 92 | 0.53% | 76 | 0.44% | 16 | 0.09% | 2,398 | 13.78% | 17,406 | SY |
| Stearns | 2,873 | 36.06% | 4,911 | 61.64% | 42 | 0.53% | 123 | 1.54% | 18 | 0.23% | -2,038 | -25.58% | 7,967 | ST |
| Steele | 2,046 | 59.41% | 1,248 | 36.24% | 80 | 2.32% | 65 | 1.89% | 5 | 0.15% | 798 | 23.17% | 3,444 | SE |
| Stevens | 981 | 57.40% | 685 | 40.08% | 28 | 1.64% | 13 | 0.76% | 2 | 0.12% | 296 | 17.32% | 1,709 | SV |
| Swift | 1,273 | 49.78% | 1,222 | 47.79% | 40 | 1.56% | 15 | 0.59% | 7 | 0.27% | 51 | 1.99% | 2,557 | SW |
| Todd | 2,043 | 52.28% | 1,739 | 44.50% | 96 | 2.46% | 29 | 0.74% | 1 | 0.03% | 304 | 7.78% | 3,908 | TD |
| Traverse | 589 | 36.65% | 963 | 59.93% | 22 | 1.37% | 28 | 1.74% | 5 | 0.31% | -374 | -23.27% | 1,607 | TR |
| Wabasha | 2,530 | 58.86% | 1,630 | 37.92% | 76 | 1.77% | 55 | 1.28% | 7 | 0.16% | 900 | 20.94% | 4,298 | WB |
| Wadena | 874 | 60.65% | 534 | 37.06% | 25 | 1.73% | 7 | 0.49% | 1 | 0.07% | 340 | 23.59% | 1,441 | WD |
| Waseca | 1,902 | 58.79% | 1,244 | 38.45% | 57 | 1.76% | 29 | 0.90% | 3 | 0.09% | 658 | 20.34% | 3,235 | WC |
| Washington | 3,995 | 70.51% | 1,558 | 27.50% | 47 | 0.83% | 58 | 1.02% | 8 | 0.14% | 2,437 | 43.01% | 5,666 | WA |
| Watonwan | 1,622 | 71.99% | 586 | 26.01% | 33 | 1.46% | 10 | 0.44% | 2 | 0.09% | 1,036 | 45.98% | 2,253 | WW |
| Wilkin | 631 | 41.30% | 855 | 55.96% | 21 | 1.37% | 16 | 1.05% | 5 | 0.33% | -224 | -14.66% | 1,528 | WK |
| Winona | 3,935 | 51.51% | 3,528 | 46.18% | 69 | 0.90% | 89 | 1.17% | 18 | 0.24% | 407 | 5.33% | 7,639 | WN |
| Wright | 3,312 | 59.37% | 2,172 | 38.93% | 49 | 0.88% | 37 | 0.66% | 9 | 0.16% | 1,140 | 20.43% | 5,579 | WR |
| Yellow Medicine | 1,578 | 58.92% | 1,015 | 37.90% | 63 | 2.35% | 21 | 0.78% | 1 | 0.04% | 563 | 21.02% | 2,678 | YM |
| Totals | 193,507 | 56.62% | 139,735 | 40.89% | 4,348 | 1.27% | 3,222 | 0.94% | 954 | 0.28% | 53,772 | 15.73% | 341,766 | MN |

== See also ==
- United States presidential elections in Minnesota
