= 1892 United States presidential election in Minnesota =

- November 8, 1892
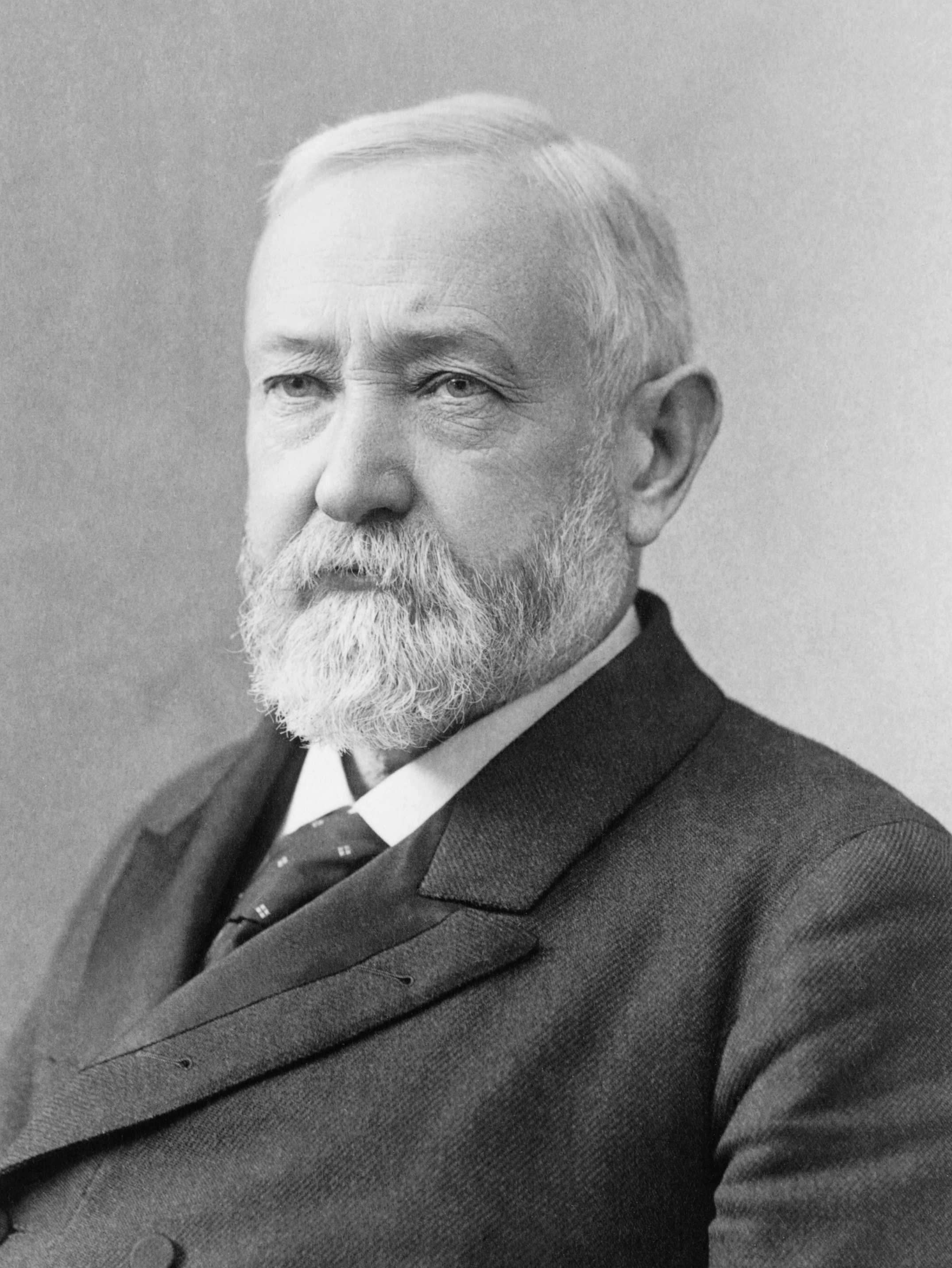

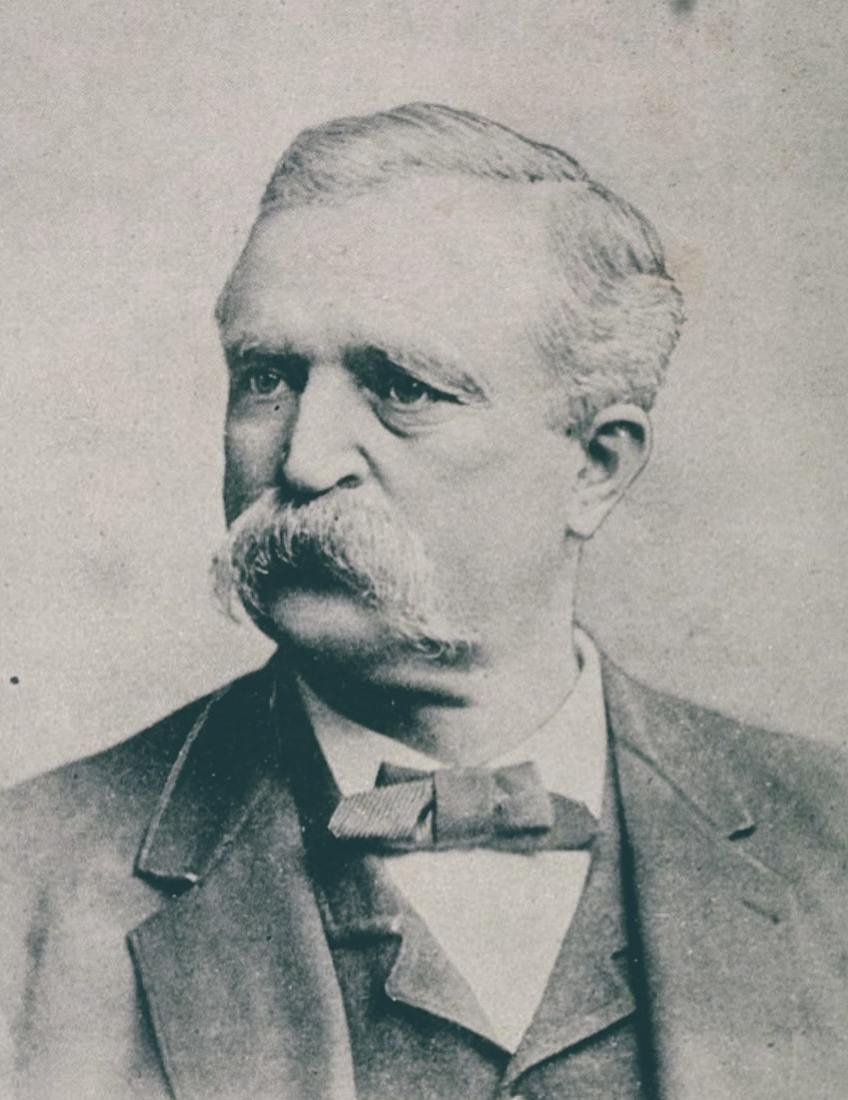
Nominee	Benjamin Harrison	Grover Cleveland	James B. Weaver
Party	Republican	Democratic	Populist
Home state	Indiana	New York	Iowa
Running mate	Whitelaw Reid	Adlai Stevenson I	James G. Field
Electoral vote	9	0	0
Popular vote	122,823	100,920	29,313
Percentage	45.96%	37.76%	10.97%
County results
Harrison
30–40%
40–50%
50–60%
60–70%
70–80%
Cleveland
30–40%
40–50%
50–60%
60–70%
Weaver
30–40%
40–50%
President before election
Benjamin Harrison
Republican
Elected President
Grover Cleveland
Democratic

The 1892 United States presidential election in Minnesota took place on November 8, 1892. All contemporary 44 states were part of the 1892 United States presidential election. Minnesota voters chose nine electors to the Electoral College, which selected the president and vice president.

Minnesota was won by the Republican nominees, incumbent President Benjamin Harrison of Indiana and his running mate Whitelaw Reid of New York.

== Campaign ==
The Minnesota Democratic Party initially announced that it would not conduct a fusion campaign, but later withdrew four of its electors in favor of Populist electors on October 10.

With 5.31 percent of the popular vote, Minnesota proved to be Prohibition Party candidate John Bidwell’s best performance as well as the only state where he broke 5 percent of the vote. This is the closest the Democrats came to winning Minnesota in the 19th century.

== Results ==
1892 United States presidential election in Minnesota
Party	Candidate	Votes	Percentage	Electoral votes
Republican	Benjamin Harrison (incumbent)	122,823	45.96%	9
Democratic	Grover Cleveland	100,920	37.76%	0
Populist	James B. Weaver	29,313	10.97%	0
Prohibition	John Bidwell	14,182	5.31%	0
Totals		267,238	100.00%	9
Voter turnout				—

=== Results by county ===
Counties carried by Harrison/Reid
Counties carried by Cleveland/Stevenson
Counties carried by Weaver/Field

County	Benjamin Harrison Republican		Stephen Grover Cleveland Democratic		James Baird Weaver Populist		John Bidwell Prohibition		Margin		Total votes cast	
County	#	%	#	%	#	%	#	%	#	%	#	
Aitkin	445	62.59%	217	30.52%	33	4.64%	16	2.25%	228	32.07%	711	AI
Anoka	1,002	52.76%	720	37.91%	44	2.32%	133	7.00%	282	14.85%	1,899	AN
Becker	853	55.43%	266	17.28%	239	15.53%	181	11.76%	587	38.14%	1,539	BK
Beltrami	57	44.88%	44	34.65%	25	19.69%	1	0.79%	13	10.24%	127	BL
Benton	426	25.63%	577	34.72%	632	38.03%	27	1.62%	-55 (Note: In this county where Harrison ran third behind Cleveland and Weaver, margin given is Cleveland vote minus Weaver vote and percentage margin Cleveland percentage minus Weaver percentage.)	-3.31%	1,662	BN
Big Stone	576	41.68%	498	36.03%	170	12.30%	138	9.99%	78	5.64%	1,382	BS
Blue Earth	2,680	46.00%	2,399	41.18%	385	6.61%	362	6.21%	281	4.82%	5,826	BE
Brown	1,080	38.48%	1,174	41.82	494	17.60%	59	2.10%	-94	-3.35%	2,807	BR
Carlton	737	58.49%	370	29.37%	108	8.57%	45	3.57%	367	29.13%	1,260	CT
Carver	1,191	40.35%	1,462	49.53%	246	8.33%	53	1.80%	-271	-9.18%	2,952	CA
Cass	311	39.72%	233	29.76%	221	28.22%	18	2.30%	78	9.96%	783	CS
Chippewa	730	44.51%	507	30.91%	244	14.88%	159	9.70%	223	13.60%	1,640	CP
Chisago	1,480	75.01%	338	17.13%	45	2.28%	110	5.58%	1,142	57.88%	1,973	CH
Clay	959	40.19%	594	24.90%	710	29.76%	123	5.16%	249 (Note: In this county where Cleveland ran behind both Harrison and Weaver, margin given is Harrison vote minus Weaver vote and percentage margin Harrison percentage minus Weaver percentage.)	10.44%	2,386	CY
Cook	68	51.52%	19	14.39%	31	23.48%	14	10.61%	37	28.03%	132	CK
Cottonwood	727	52.38%	202	14.55%	333	23.99%	126	9.08%	394	28.39%	1,388	CD
Crow Wing	916	53.10%	519	30.09%	193	11.19%	97	5.62%	397	23.01%	1,725	CW
Dakota	1,481	37.95%	1,989	50.97%	264	6.77%	168	4.31%	-508	-13.02%	3,902	DK
Dodge	1,219	55.33%	536	24.33%	309	14.03%	139	6.31%	683	31.00%	2,203	DO
Douglas	1,315	50.89%	533	20.63%	484	18.73%	252	9.75%	782	30.26%	2,584	DG
Faribault	1,992	58.01%	1,070	31.16%	86	2.50%	286	8.33%	922	26.85%	3,434	FA
Fillmore	2,925	56.53%	1,346	26.01%	542	10.48%	361	6.98%	1,579	30.52%	5,174	FI
Freeborn	2,004	61.27%	743	22.71%	281	8.59%	243	7.43%	1,261	38.55%	3,271	FB
Goodhue	3,574	61.60%	1,659	28.59%	212	3.65%	357	6.15%	1,915	33.01%	5,802	GH
Grant	776	55.35%	319	22.75%	182	12.98%	125	8.92%	457	32.60%	1,402	GR
Hennepin	20,803	50.18%	16,448	39.67%	2,326	5.61%	1,883	4.54%	4,355	10.50%	41,460	HN
Houston	1,509	50.13%	1,243	41.30%	170	5.65%	88	2.92%	266	8.84%	3,010	HS
Hubbard	164	35.65%	129	28.04%	161	35.00%	6	1.30%	3	0.65%	460	HU
Isanti	728	52.11%	105	7.52%	308	22.05%	256	18.32%	420	30.06%	1,397	IS
Itasca	520	40.66%	686	53.64%	50	3.91%	23	1.80%	-166	-12.98%	1,279	IT
Jackson	901	46.16%	721	36.94%	267	13.68%	63	3.23%	180	9.22%	1,952	JK
Kanabec	182	53.53%	38	11.18%	35	10.29%	85	25.00%	97 (Note: In this county where Bidwell ran second ahead of Cleveland, margin given is Harrison vote minus Bidwell vote and percentage margin Harrison percentage minus Bidwell percentage.)	28.53%	340	KA
Kandiyohi	1,341	50.93%	391	14.85%	601	22.83%	300	11.39%	740	28.10%	2,633	KD
Kittson	408	32.46%	307	24.42%	446	35.48%	96	7.64%	-38	-3.02%	1,257	KI
Lac qui Parle	1,164	52.31%	457	20.54%	510	22.92%	94	4.22%	654	29.39%	2,225	LQ
Lake	290	60.04%	126	26.09%	38	7.87%	29	6.00%	164	33.95%	483	LK
Le Sueur	1,465	39.73%	1,821	49.39%	255	6.92%	146	3.96%	-356	-9.66%	3,687	LS
Lincoln	318	28.65%	396	35.68%	310	27.93%	86	7.75%	-78	-7.03%	1,110	LN
Lyon	1,068	50.88%	486	23.15%	280	13.34%	265	12.63%	582	27.73%	2,099	LY
Marshall	526	27.90%	354	18.78%	892	47.32%	113	5.99%	-366	-19.42%	1,885	MH
Martin	1,189	57.22%	661	31.81%	103	4.96%	125	6.02%	528	25.41%	2,078	MT
McLeod	902	32.28%	1,523	54.51%	252	9.02%	117	4.19%	-621	-22.23%	2,794	MD
Meeker	1,274	42.09%	1,146	37.86%	348	11.50%	259	8.56%	128	4.23%	3,027	MK
Mille Lacs	463	56.05%	223	27.00%	103	12.47%	37	4.48%	240	29.06%	826	ML
Morrison	1,135	37.76%	1,585	52.73%	160	5.32%	126	4.19%	-450	-14.97%	3,006	MR
Mower	2,234	56.36%	1,310	33.05%	169	4.26%	251	6.33%	924	23.31%	3,964	MO
Murray	586	36.90%	517	32.56%	412	25.94%	73	4.60%	69	4.35%	1,588	MU
Nicollet	1,098	47.70%	937	40.70%	184	7.99%	83	3.61%	161	6.99%	2,302	NI
Nobles	894	44.24%	664	32.86%	318	15.73%	145	7.17%	230	11.38%	2,021	NO
Norman	724	38.97%	294	15.82%	596	32.08%	244	13.13%	128	6.89%	1,858	NR
Olmsted	2,344	50.79%	1,931	41.84%	159	3.45%	181	3.92%	413	8.95%	4,615	OL
Otter Tail	2,140	37.40%	1,642	28.70%	1,466	25.62%	474	8.28%	498	8.70%	5,722	OT
Pine	538	48.42%	458	41.22%	70	6.30%	45	4.05%	80	7.20%	1,111	PN
Pipestone	648	47.96%	295	21.84%	346	25.61%	62	4.59%	302	22.35%	1,351	PS
Polk	1,376	23.35%	1,510	25.63%	2,775	47.10%	231	3.92%	-1,265	-21.47%	5,892	PL
Pope	1,037	57.32%	282	15.59%	361	19.96%	129	7.13%	676	37.37%	1,809	PO
Ramsey	11,307	41.99%	12,817	47.60%	1,725	6.41%	1,077	4.00%	-1,510	-5.61%	26,926	RM
Redwood	1,155	43.54%	645	24.31%	734	27.67%	119	4.49%	421	15.87%	2,653	RW
Renville	1,370	39.95%	984	28.70%	925	26.98%	150	4.37%	386	11.26%	3,429	RV
Rice	2,245	48.29%	1,794	38.59%	352	7.57%	258	5.55%	451	9.70%	4,649	RC
Rock	940	59.64%	383	24.30%	176	11.17%	77	4.89%	557	35.34%	1,576	RK
Scott	760	26.86%	1,937	68.47%	99	3.50%	33	1.17%	-1,177	-41.60%	2,829	SL
Sherburne	632	53.88%	290	24.72%	202	17.22%	49	4.18%	342	29.16%	1,173	SC
Sibley	958	37.99%	1,191	47.22%	325	12.89%	48	1.90%	-233	-9.24%	2,522	SB
St. Louis	5,157	49.67%	3,586	34.54%	985	9.49%	655	6.31%	1,571	15.13%	10,383	SY
Stearns	1,624	23.68%	4,461	65.04%	551	8.03%	223	3.25%	-2,837	-41.36%	6,859	ST
Steele	1,396	48.71%	1,299	45.32%	55	1.92%	116	4.05%	97	3.38%	2,866	SE
Stevens	622	46.21%	509	37.82%	144	10.70%	71	5.27%	113	8.40%	1,346	SV
Swift	762	37.39%	712	34.94%	434	21.30%	130	6.38%	50	2.45%	2,038	SW
Todd	1,251	42.09%	1,118	37.62%	460	15.48%	143	4.81%	133	4.48%	2,972	TD
Traverse	413	39.33%	317	30.19%	258	24.57%	62	5.90%	96	9.14%	1,050	TR
Wabasha	1,580	43.16%	1,774	48.46%	151	4.12%	156	4.26%	-194	-5.30%	3,661	WB
Wadena	454	45.35%	332	33.17%	161	16.08%	54	5.39%	122	12.19%	1,001	WD
Waseca	1,090	44.86%	1,042	42.88%	164	6.75%	134	5.51%	48	1.98%	2,430	WC
Washington	2,451	53.31%	1,733	37.69%	298	6.48%	116	2.52%	718	15.62%	4,598	WA
Watonwan	934	62.68%	388	26.04%	75	5.03%	93	6.24%	546	36.64%	1,490	WW
Wilkin	434	42.67%	363	35.69%	169	16.62%	51	5.01%	71	6.98%	1,017	WK
Winona	2,734	39.95%	3,701	54.08%	256	3.74%	153	2.24%	-967	-14.13%	6,844	WN
Wright	2,271	48.56%	1,829	39.11%	337	7.21%	240	5.13%	442	9.45%	4,677	WR
Yellow Medicine	911	49.11%	364	19.62%	379	20.43%	201	10.84%	532	28.68%	1,855	YM
Totals	122,944	45.87%	100,589	37.53%	30,399	11.34%	14,117	5.27%	22,355	8.34%	268,049	MN

== See also ==
- United States presidential elections in Minnesota

== Works cited ==
- Knoles, George (1971). The Presidential Campaign and Election of 1892. Stanford University Press. ISBN 040450969X.
