= 1948 United States presidential election in Minnesota =

- November 2, 1948

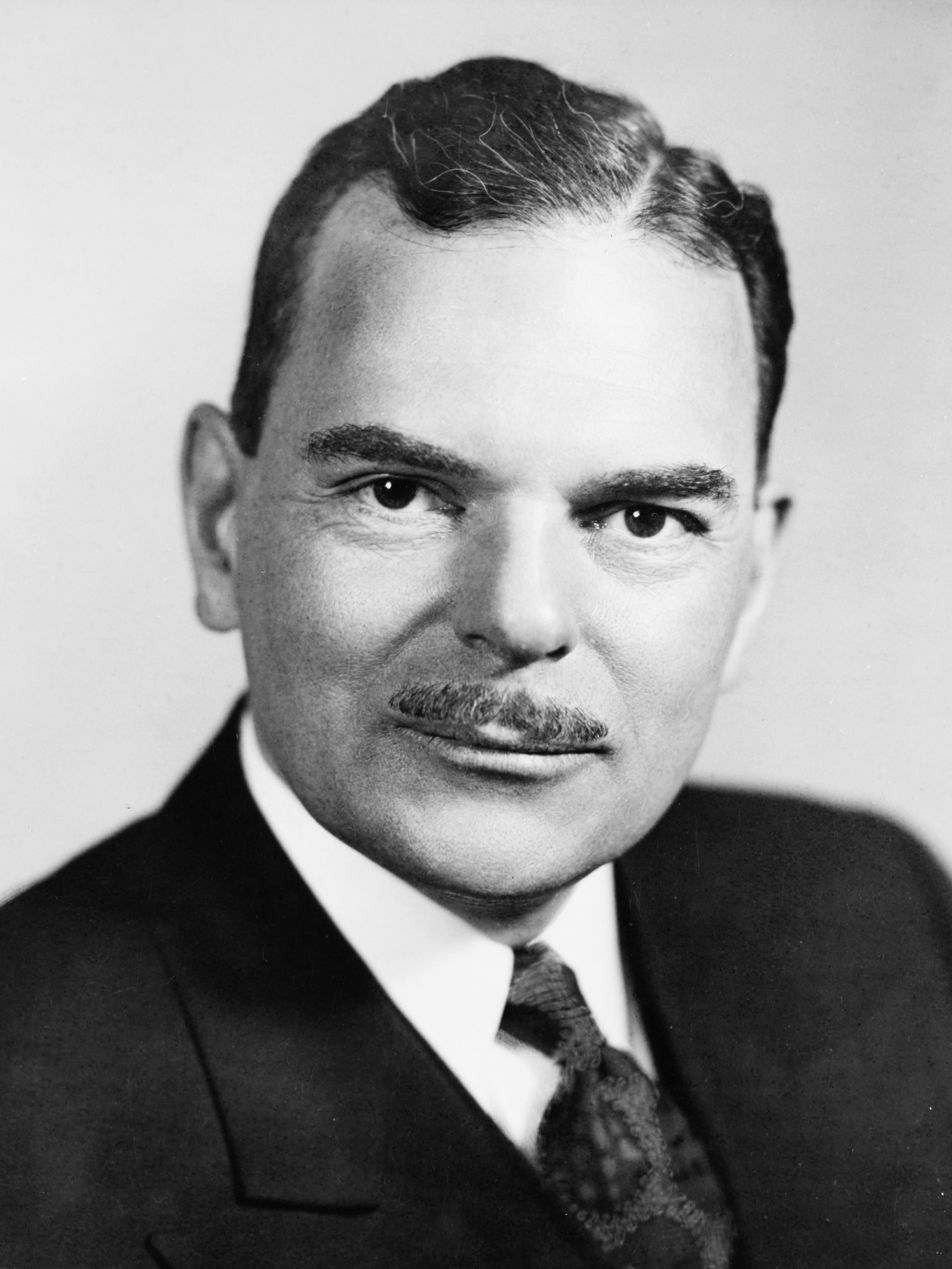
Nominee	Harry S. Truman	Thomas E. Dewey
Party	Democratic (DFL)	Republican
Home state	Missouri	New York
Running mate	Alben W. Barkley	Earl Warren
Electoral vote	11	0
Popular vote	692,966	483,617
Percentage	57.16%	39.89%
County results
Truman
40–50%
50–60%
60–70%
70–80%
Dewey
40–50%
50–60%
60–70%
President before election
Harry S. Truman
Democratic
Elected President
Harry S. Truman
Democratic

The 1948 United States presidential election in Minnesota took place on November 2, 1948, as part of the 1948 United States presidential election. Voters chose 11 electors, or representatives to the Electoral College, who voted for president and vice president.

Minnesota was won by the Democratic candidate, incumbent President Harry S. Truman, who had assumed the presidency following the death of Franklin D. Roosevelt in 1945, won the state over New York governor Thomas E. Dewey by a margin of 209,349 votes, or 17.27%. Nationally, the election was the greatest election upset in American history; nearly every prediction forecast that Truman would be defeated by Dewey, but in the end, Truman won the election with 303 electoral votes and a comfortable 4.5% lead over Dewey in the popular vote.

== Results ==
1948 United States presidential election in Minnesota
Party	Candidate	Votes	Percentage	Electoral votes
Democratic (DFL)	Harry S. Truman (incumbent)	692,966	57.16%	11
Republican	Thomas E. Dewey	483,617	39.89%	0
Progressive	Henry A. Wallace	27,866	2.30%	0
Socialist	Norman Thomas	4,646	0.38%	0
Socialist Labor	Edward A. Teichert	2,525	0.21%	0
Socialist Workers	Farrell Dobbs	606	0.05%	0
Totals		1,212,226	100.00%	11

=== Results by county ===
County	Harry S. Truman DFL		Thomas E. Dewey Republican		Henry A. Wallace Progressive		Various candidates Other parties		Margin		Total votes cast
County	#	%	#	%	#	%	#	%	#	%	Total votes cast
Aitkin	3,277	54.55%	2,466	41.05%	227	3.78%	37	0.62%	811	13.50%	6,007
Anoka	7,730	64.80%	3,853	32.30%	291	2.44%	55	0.46%	3,877	32.50%	11,929
Becker	5,885	60.50%	3,495	35.93%	314	3.23%	33	0.34%	2,390	24.57%	9,727
Beltrami	6,020	62.84%	3,126	32.63%	405	4.23%	29	0.30%	2,894	30.21%	9,580
Benton	3,632	60.38%	2,297	38.19%	66	1.10%	20	0.33%	1,335	22.19%	6,015
Big Stone	2,466	63.46%	1,321	33.99%	81	2.08%	18	0.46%	1,145	29.47%	3,886
Blue Earth	7,272	48.63%	7,520	50.29%	109	0.73%	53	0.35%	-248	-1.66%	14,954
Brown	4,804	47.96%	5,068	50.60%	80	0.80%	64	0.64%	-264	-2.64%	10,016
Carlton	6,967	68.59%	2,742	27.00%	404	3.98%	44	0.43%	4,225	41.59%	10,157
Carver	2,816	37.64%	4,582	61.24%	60	0.80%	24	0.32%	-1,766	-23.60%	7,482
Cass	3,933	54.04%	3,179	43.68%	141	1.94%	25	0.34%	754	10.36%	7,278
Chippewa	3,888	58.50%	2,569	38.65%	163	2.45%	26	0.39%	1,319	19.85%	6,646
Chisago	3,184	52.50%	2,704	44.58%	160	2.64%	17	0.28%	480	7.92%	6,065
Clay	6,624	59.43%	4,302	38.60%	176	1.58%	43	0.39%	2,322	20.83%	11,145
Clearwater	2,793	66.31%	1,171	27.80%	230	5.46%	18	0.43%	1,622	38.51%	4,212
Cook	688	48.93%	674	47.94%	38	2.70%	6	0.43%	14	0.99%	1,406
Cottonwood	3,333	50.26%	3,222	48.58%	40	0.60%	37	0.56%	111	1.68%	6,632
Crow Wing	6,773	57.18%	4,702	39.70%	325	2.74%	45	0.38%	2,071	17.48%	11,845
Dakota	12,487	63.63%	6,819	34.75%	229	1.17%	88	0.45%	5,668	28.88%	19,623
Dodge	2,523	50.86%	2,381	47.99%	39	0.79%	18	0.36%	142	2.87%	4,961
Douglas	5,022	55.97%	3,744	41.73%	178	1.98%	29	0.32%	1,278	14.24%	8,973
Faribault	5,261	52.54%	4,619	46.13%	93	0.93%	41	0.41%	642	6.41%	10,014
Fillmore	4,414	43.58%	5,587	55.16%	104	1.03%	23	0.23%	-1,173	-11.58%	10,128
Freeborn	7,825	58.94%	5,238	39.45%	171	1.29%	42	0.32%	2,587	19.49%	13,276
Goodhue	7,313	51.42%	6,704	47.14%	141	0.99%	64	0.45%	609	4.28%	14,222
Grant	2,378	54.19%	1,789	40.77%	211	4.81%	10	0.23%	589	13.42%	4,388
Hennepin	151,920	53.83%	121,169	42.93%	7,090	2.51%	2,055	0.73%	30,751	10.90%	282,234
Houston	2,623	42.10%	3,540	56.81%	41	0.66%	27	0.43%	-917	-14.71%	6,231
Hubbard	2,044	48.20%	2,071	48.83%	112	2.64%	14	0.33%	-27	-0.63%	4,241
Isanti	2,758	55.23%	1,918	38.41%	208	4.16%	110	2.20%	840	16.82%	4,994
Itasca	9,653	65.60%	4,334	29.45%	638	4.34%	91	0.62%	5,319	36.15%	14,716
Jackson	4,541	65.16%	2,288	32.83%	112	1.61%	28	0.40%	2,253	32.33%	6,969
Kanabec	2,305	58.06%	1,531	38.56%	104	2.62%	30	0.76%	774	19.50%	3,970
Kandiyohi	7,204	62.14%	3,666	31.62%	679	5.86%	44	0.38%	3,538	30.52%	11,593
Kittson	2,970	71.00%	1,035	24.74%	160	3.83%	18	0.43%	1,935	46.26%	4,183
Koochiching	4,968	71.30%	1,718	24.66%	247	3.54%	35	0.50%	3,250	46.64%	6,968
Lac qui Parle	3,690	60.49%	2,330	38.20%	65	1.07%	15	0.25%	1,360	22.29%	6,100
Lake	2,555	68.52%	924	24.78%	216	5.79%	34	0.91%	1,631	43.74%	3,729
Lake of the Woods	1,302	64.94%	583	29.08%	101	5.04%	19	0.95%	719	35.86%	2,005
Le Sueur	4,890	55.39%	3,858	43.70%	53	0.60%	27	0.31%	1,032	11.69%	8,828
Lincoln	2,694	65.87%	1,312	32.08%	60	1.47%	24	0.59%	1,382	33.79%	4,090
Lyon	6,144	66.16%	3,054	32.89%	61	0.66%	27	0.29%	3,090	33.27%	9,286
Mahnomen	2,125	76.58%	579	20.86%	61	2.20%	10	0.36%	1,546	55.72%	2,775
Marshall	4,126	63.41%	2,090	32.12%	266	4.09%	25	0.38%	2,036	31.29%	6,507
Martin	6,015	55.88%	4,662	43.31%	58	0.54%	29	0.27%	1,353	12.57%	10,764
McLeod	3,987	45.74%	4,623	53.04%	74	0.85%	32	0.37%	-636	-7.30%	8,716
Meeker	4,333	53.73%	3,620	44.89%	89	1.10%	23	0.29%	713	8.84%	8,065
Mille Lacs	3,343	55.36%	2,502	41.43%	163	2.70%	31	0.51%	841	13.93%	6,039
Morrison	6,026	59.71%	3,922	38.86%	105	1.04%	39	0.39%	2,104	20.85%	10,092
Mower	9,468	61.88%	5,672	37.07%	104	0.68%	57	0.37%	3,796	24.81%	15,301
Murray	3,594	64.16%	1,951	34.83%	40	0.71%	17	0.30%	1,643	29.33%	5,602
Nicollet	3,663	50.01%	3,576	48.82%	57	0.78%	29	0.40%	87	1.19%	7,325
Nobles	5,090	60.73%	3,203	38.21%	66	0.79%	23	0.27%	1,887	22.52%	8,382
Norman	3,245	62.92%	1,695	32.87%	186	3.61%	31	0.60%	1,550	30.05%	5,157
Olmsted	9,155	52.41%	8,131	46.55%	112	0.64%	69	0.40%	1,024	5.86%	17,467
Otter Tail	6,546	36.02%	11,131	61.25%	437	2.40%	58	0.32%	-4,585	-25.23%	18,172
Pennington	3,402	60.66%	1,759	31.37%	416	7.42%	31	0.55%	1,643	29.29%	5,608
Pine	4,978	59.21%	3,069	36.51%	320	3.81%	40	0.48%	1,909	22.70%	8,407
Pipestone	2,804	54.13%	2,281	44.03%	74	1.43%	21	0.41%	523	10.10%	5,180
Polk	9,279	63.64%	4,662	31.98%	573	3.93%	66	0.45%	4,617	31.66%	14,580
Pope	3,251	59.52%	2,114	38.70%	78	1.43%	19	0.35%	1,137	20.82%	5,462
Ramsey	88,528	62.84%	48,142	34.17%	2,485	1.76%	1,732	1.23%	40,386	28.67%	140,887
Red Lake	1,771	71.76%	592	23.99%	95	3.85%	10	0.41%	1,179	47.77%	2,468
Redwood	4,182	49.52%	4,160	49.26%	70	0.83%	33	0.39%	22	0.26%	8,445
Renville	5,227	54.00%	4,297	44.40%	115	1.19%	40	0.41%	930	9.60%	9,679
Rice	5,832	47.33%	6,301	51.14%	110	0.89%	78	0.63%	-469	-3.81%	12,321
Rock	2,134	50.40%	2,035	48.06%	56	1.32%	9	0.21%	99	2.34%	4,234
Roseau	3,674	66.46%	1,458	26.37%	381	6.89%	15	0.27%	2,216	40.09%	5,528
St. Louis	62,553	64.29%	28,490	29.28%	5,154	5.30%	1,095	1.13%	34,063	35.01%	97,292
Scott	4,278	61.69%	2,583	37.25%	45	0.65%	29	0.42%	1,695	24.44%	6,935
Sherburne	1,958	50.27%	1,828	46.93%	98	2.52%	11	0.28%	130	3.34%	3,895
Sibley	2,818	45.77%	3,260	52.95%	51	0.83%	28	0.45%	-442	-7.18%	6,157
Stearns	15,261	59.37%	10,153	39.50%	202	0.79%	90	0.35%	5,108	19.87%	25,706
Steele	4,305	48.83%	4,451	50.49%	38	0.43%	22	0.25%	-146	-1.66%	8,816
Stevens	2,313	54.00%	1,928	45.02%	31	0.72%	11	0.26%	385	8.98%	4,283
Swift	4,082	63.11%	2,109	32.61%	254	3.93%	23	0.36%	1,973	30.50%	6,468
Todd	5,157	54.08%	4,166	43.69%	155	1.63%	57	0.60%	991	10.39%	9,535
Traverse	2,151	66.74%	1,008	31.28%	49	1.52%	15	0.47%	1,143	35.46%	3,223
Wabasha	3,730	52.52%	3,297	46.42%	42	0.59%	33	0.46%	433	6.10%	7,102
Wadena	2,556	51.98%	2,272	46.21%	76	1.55%	13	0.26%	284	5.77%	4,917
Waseca	3,120	46.71%	3,511	52.56%	28	0.42%	21	0.31%	-391	-5.85%	6,680
Washington	8,039	57.54%	5,686	40.70%	175	1.25%	70	0.50%	2,353	16.84%	13,970
Watonwan	3,039	53.33%	2,581	45.30%	52	0.91%	26	0.46%	458	8.03%	5,698
Wilkin	2,291	56.43%	1,700	41.87%	58	1.43%	11	0.27%	591	14.56%	4,060
Winona	8,281	54.08%	6,880	44.93%	66	0.43%	86	0.56%	1,401	9.15%	15,313
Wright	5,523	48.89%	5,589	49.47%	145	1.28%	40	0.35%	-66	-0.58%	11,297
Yellow Medicine	4,164	59.38%	2,693	38.41%	133	1.90%	22	0.31%	1,471	20.97%	7,012
Totals	692,966	57.16%	483,617	39.89%	27,866	2.30%	7,777	0.64%	209,349	17.27%	1,212,226

==== Counties that flipped from Republican to Democratic ====
- Benton
- Chisago
- Cottonwood
- Dodge
- Douglas
- Faribault
- Freeborn
- Goodhue
- Kanabec
- Lac qui Parle
- Le Sueur
- Martin
- Meeker
- Morrison
- Murray
- Nicollet
- Nobles
- Olmsted
- Pipestone
- Redwood
- Renville
- Rock
- Scott
- Sherburne
- Stearns
- Stevens
- Todd
- Wabasha
- Wadena
- Washington
- Watonwan
- Wilkin
- Winona
- Yellow Medicine

== See also ==
- United States presidential elections in Minnesota
