= 1864 United States presidential election in Minnesota =

- November 8, 1864
- Turnout: 24.66% of the total population ▲4.43 pp

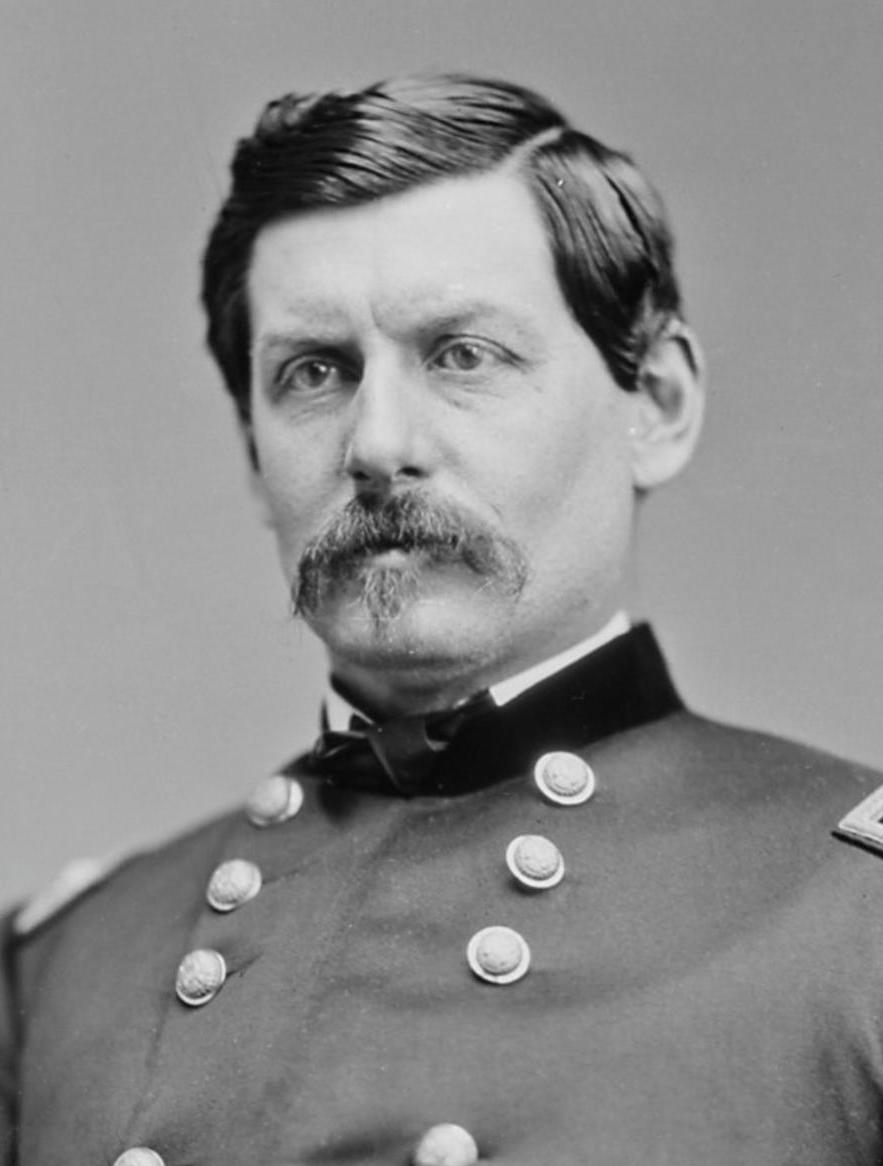
Nominee	Abraham Lincoln	George B. McClellan
Party	National Union	Democratic
Home state	Illinois	New Jersey
Running mate	Andrew Johnson	George H. Pendleton
Electoral vote	4	0
Popular vote	25,055	17,367
Percentage	59.06%	40.94%
County results
Lincoln
50–60%
60–70%
70–80%
80–90%
90–100%
McClellan
50–60%
60–70%
70–80%
Unknown/No Vote
President before election
Abraham Lincoln
Republican
Elected President
Abraham Lincoln
National Union

The 1864 United States presidential election in Minnesota took place on November 8, 1864, as part of the 1864 United States presidential election. State voters chose four representatives, or electors, to the Electoral College, who voted for president and vice president.

Minnesota was won by the National Union nominee, incumbent Republican President Abraham Lincoln of Illinois and his running mate former Senator and Military Governor of Tennessee Andrew Johnson. They defeated the Democratic nominee, 4th Commanding General of the United States Army George B. McClellan of New Jersey and his running mate Representative George H. Pendleton of Ohio. Lincoln won the state by a margin of 18.12%.

== Results ==
1864 United States presidential election in Minnesota
Party	Candidate	Running mate	Popular vote		Electoral vote	
Party	Candidate	Running mate	Count	%	Count	%
National Union	Abraham Lincoln of Illinois	Andrew Johnson of Tennessee	25,055	59.06%	4	100.00%
Democratic	George B. McClellan of New Jersey	George H. Pendleton of Ohio	17,367	40.94%	0	0.00%
Total			42,422	100.00%	4	100.00%

=== Results by county ===
County	Abraham Lincoln Republican		George B. McClellan Democratic		Margin		Total votes cast
County	#	%	#	%	#	%	Total votes cast
Anoka	285	63.05%	167	36.95%	118	26.10%	452
Benton	52	49.52%	53	50.48%	-1	-0.96%	105
Blue Earth	962	63.00%	565	37.00%	397	26.00%	1,527
Brown	326	84.90%	58	15.10%	268	69.80%	384
Carver	484	44.24%	610	55.76%	-126	-11.52%	1
Cass	5	55.56%	4	44.44%	1	11.12%	9
Chisago	371	80.83%	88	19.17%	283	61.66%	459
Dakota	1,176	50.04%	1,178	49.96%	2	-0.08%	2,354
Dodge	760	70.05%	325	29.95%	375	40.10%	1,085
Faribault	642	80.05%	160	19.95%	482	60.10%	802
Fillmore	1,642	61.43%	1,031	38.57%	611	22.86%	2,673
Freeborn	653	74.71%	221	25.29%	432	49.42%	874
Goodhue	1,866	73.06%	688	26.94%	1,178	46.12%	2,554
Hennepin	1,711	58.36%	1,221	41.64%	490	16.72%	2,932
Houston	796	55.63%	635	44.37%	161	11.26%	1,431
Isanti	59	71.08%	24	28.92%	35	42.16%	83
Le Sueur	495	37.90%	811	62.10%	-316	-24.20%	1,306
McLeod	202	58.72%	142	41.28%	60	17.44%	344
Martin	190	91.79%	17	8.21%	173	85.38%	207
Meeker	115	57.79%	84	42.21%	31	15.58%	199
Mille Lacs	51	71.83%	20	28.17%	31	43.66%	71
Morrison	25	33.33%	50	66.67%	-25	-33.34%	75
Mower	637	74.85%	214	25.15%	423	49.70%	851
Nicollet	505	54.59%	420	45.41%	85	9.18%	925
Olmsted	1,848	69.03%	829	30.97%	1,019	38.06%	2,677
Pine	17	80.95%	4	19.05%	13	61.90%	21
Ramsey	1,258	46.96%	1,421	53.04%	-163	-6.08%	2,679
Rice	1,275	65.65%	667	34.35%	608	31.30%	1,942
Saint Louis	39	88.64%	5	11.36%	34	77.28%	44
Scott	396	27.48%	1,045	72.52%	-649	-45.04%	1,441
Sherburne	108	58.06%	78	41.94%	30	16.12%	186
Sibley	263	32.00%	559	68.00%	-296	-36.00%	822
Stearns	427	31.77%	917	68.23%	-490	-36.46%	1,344
Steele	636	75.27%	209	24.73%	427	50.54%	845
Todd	22	41.51%	31	58.49%	-9	-16.59%	53
Wabasha	1,392	68.71%	634	31.29%	758	37.42%	2,026
Waseca	418	59.54%	284	40.46%	134	19.08%	702
Washington	782	60.90%	502	39.10%	280	21.80%	1,284
Watonwan	38	88.37%	5	11.63%	33	76.74%	43
Winona	1,590	60.64%	1,032	39.36%	558	21.28%	2,622
Wright	528	59.73%	356	40.27%	172	19.46%	184
Totals	25,055	59.06%	17,367	340.94%	7,688	18.12%	42,422

== See also ==
- United States presidential elections in Minnesota
