= 1876 United States presidential election in Minnesota =

- November 7, 1876
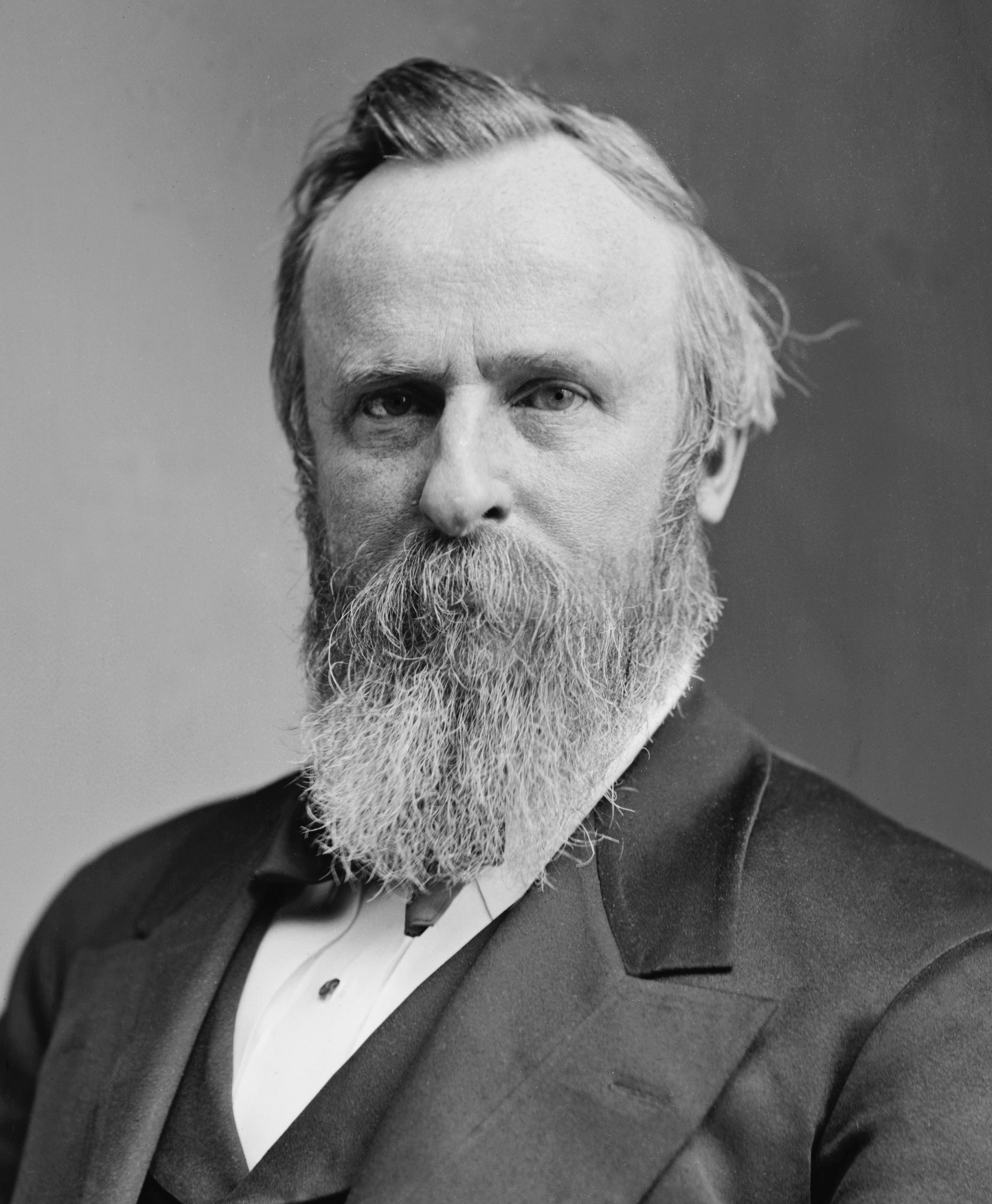

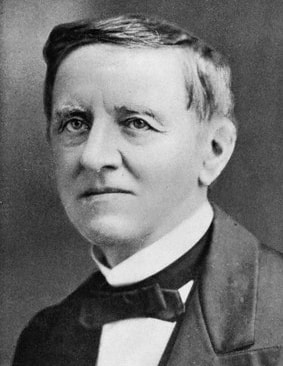
Nominee	Rutherford B. Hayes	Samuel J. Tilden
Party	Republican	Democratic
Home state	Ohio	New York
Running mate	William A. Wheeler	Thomas A. Hendricks
Electoral vote	5	0
Popular vote	72,955	48,587
Percentage	58.80%	39.16%
County results
Hayes
50–60%
60–70%
70–80%
80–90%
90–100%
Tilden
40–50%
50–60%
60–70%
70–80%
President before election
Ulysses S. Grant
Republican
Elected President
Rutherford B. Hayes
Republican

The 1876 United States presidential election in Minnesota took place on November 7, 1876, as part of the 1876 United States presidential election. Voters chose five representatives, or electors to the Electoral College, who voted for president and vice president.

Minnesota voted for the Republican nominee, Rutherford B. Hayes, over the Democratic nominee, Samuel J. Tilden. Hayes won the state by a margin of 19.64%.

With 58.80% of the popular vote, Minnesota was Hayes' fifth strongest victory by percentage of the popular vote, after Vermont, Nebraska, Kansas and Rhode Island.

== Results ==
1876 United States presidential election in Minnesota
Party	Candidate	Running mate	Popular vote		Electoral vote	
Party	Candidate	Running mate	Count	%	Count	%
Republican	Rutherford B. Hayes of Ohio	William A. Wheeler of New York	72,955	58.80%	5	100.00%
Democratic	Samuel J. Tilden of New York	Thomas A. Hendricks of Indiana	48,587	39.16%	0	0.00%
Greenback	Peter Cooper of New York	Samuel Fenton Cary of Ohio	2,389	1.93%	0	0.00%
Prohibition	Green Clay Smith of Kentucky	Gideon T. Stewart of Ohio	144	0.12%	0	0.00%
Total			124,075	100.00%	5	100.00%

== See also ==
- United States presidential elections in Minnesota
