= Janesville Public Library =

Janesville Public Library may refer to:

- Janesville Free Public Library, Janesville, Minnesota, listed on the National Register of Historic Places in Waseca County, Minnesota
- Janesville Public Library (Janesville, Wisconsin), listed on the National Register of Historic Places in Rock County, Wisconsin
