= Al DeKruif =

American politician

Member of the Minnesota Senate from the 25th district
- In office January 4, 2011 – January 7, 2013
- Preceded by: Kevin Dahle
- Succeeded by: district redrawn

Personal details
- Born: February 3, 1956 (age 70)
- Party: Republican
- Spouse: Carol
- Children: 2
- Education: University of Minnesota
- Occupation: consultant, business owner, legislator

Allan D. "Al" DeKruif (born February 3, 1956) is an American politician and a former member of the Minnesota Senate in which he represented District 25.

== Politics ==
Allan DeKruif represented District 25 which included:

- Le Sueur
- Rice
- Scott
- Sibley counties in the south central part of the state.

DeKruif was first elected in 2010. He was a member of the Education, the Jobs and Economic Growth, and the Transportation committees. His special legislative concerns included the state's business climate and building the state budget with long term growth in mind. On May 21, 2011, he joined the Senate Republican Majority in voting for a constitutional amendment to define marriage as a legal bond exclusively between a man and woman.

=== Legislative Committees ===
Dekruif was a member of the following legislative committees:

- Education, Member
- Jobs and Economic Growth, Member
- Transportation, Member

== Information ==
As a Republican, he is a consultant and owner of DeKruif Enterprises, Inc., This company not only handles the planning and permitting of super load moves across America, but it also runs the moving of large electric transformers into nuclear and coal-fired power plants and substations. He is also the owner of Sakatah Trail Resort in Madison Lake. He is a member of the Minnesota Patriot Guard, and served as a ride captain for two years.

== Family ==
DeKruif is married to Carol, and together they have two children named Jason and Melissa.

== Education ==
DeKruif attended the University of Minnesota in Waseca.

== Organizations ==
Al DeKruif has been a member of the following organizations:

- Chair of the Board of Trustees, Lutheran Church
- Ride Captain, Minnesota Patriot Guard
