= Minnesota's 20th Senate district =

American legislative district

Minnesota's 20th State Senate district
Senator
Rich Draheim; R–Madison Lake
since January 3, 2017
- Demographics: 95.3% White; 1.8% Black; 2.3% Asian; 0.9% Native American; 0.2% Hawaiian/Pacific Islander; 2.3% Other
- Population (2016) • Voting age • Citizens of voting age: 84,299; 64,060; 62,385

Minnesota Senate, District 20 is a district of the Minnesota Senate which covers a majority of Rice County, all of Le Sueur County, and part of Scott County in southeastern Minnesota.

== List of senators ==
- Kevin Dahle (January 8, 2013 - January 2, 2017)
- Rich Draheim (January 3, 2017 – present)
