= Traverse des Sioux Library System =

Library system in Minnesota, U.S.

The Traverse des Sioux Library System (TdS) is a regional public library system in south-central Minnesota, founded in 1975. Mankato is the seat of the library administration.

== Counties served ==
- Blue Earth
- Brown
- Faribault
- Le Sueur
- Martin
- Nicollet
- Sibley
- Waseca
- Watonwan

== Branch locations ==
- Arlington
- Blue Earth
- Butterfield
- Ceylon
- Comfrey
- Darfur
- Dunnell
- Elmore
- Elysian
- Fairmont
- Gaylord
- Gibbon
- Hanska
- Henderson
- Janesville
- Lake Crystal
- Le Center
- Le Sueur
- Lewisville
- Madelia
- Mankato
- Mapleton
- Montgomery
- New Richland
- New Ulm
- North Mankato
- St. James
- St. Peter
- Sherburn
- Sleepy Eye
- Springfield
- Trimont
- Truman
- Waldorf
- Waseca
- Waterville
- Welcome
- Wells
- Winnebago
- Winthrop
