= Otisco Township =

Otisco Township may refer to the following places in the United States:

- Otisco Township, Michigan
- Otisco Township, Waseca County, Minnesota
