= Lewer =

Lewer is a surname. Notable people with the surname include:

- Andrew Lewer (born 1971), British politician
- David Lewer (1919–2005), English author, architect, historian, and choral musician
- Ethel Harriet Comyns-Lewer (1861–1946), British ornithologist and periodical editor, publisher and owner
- John D. Lewer (1886-1943), American businessman, farmer, and politician
- Richard Lewer (born 1970), Australian artist

== See also ==
- Lewers
