= Ernie Jessen =

American football player (1905–1987)

No. 51
- Position: Offensive tackle

Personal information
- Born: May 1, 1905; Dickinson, North Dakota, U.S.
- Died: September 23, 1987 (aged 82); Cedar Rapids, Iowa, U.S.
- Listed height: 6 ft 1 in (1.85 m)
- Listed weight: 225 lb (102 kg)

Career information
- High school: Waseca High School
- College: Iowa

Career history
- Cleveland Indians (1931)

Career statistics
- Games played: 8
- Games started: 6
- Stats at Pro Football Reference

Ernest Robert Jessen (May 1, 1905 – September 23, 1987) was an American football tackle who played one season for the Cleveland Indians of the National Football League (NFL). He played college football at Iowa.

Jessen was born on May 1, 1905, in Dickinson, North Dakota. He attended high school in Waseca, Minnesota. Afterwards he played college football at University of Iowa. Jessen spent 1925 to 1928 at Iowa, before attempting a wrestling career in 1929. In 1931, he returned to American football by playing with the newly formed Cleveland Indians. As the team's starting tackle, Jessen played in 8 games, starting 6. The Indians folded following the season, ending his professional football career. He died on September 23, 1987, in Cedar Rapids, Iowa. He was 82 at the time of his death.
