= Otisco =

Otisco may refer to the following places in the United States:

- Otisco, Indiana
- Otisco, New York
- Otisco Lake, one of the Finger Lakes in New York
- Otisco Township, Michigan
- Otisco Township, Minnesota
