= National Register of Historic Places listings in Waseca County, Minnesota =

Location of Waseca County in Minnesota

This is a list of the National Register of Historic Places listings in Waseca County, Minnesota. It is intended to be a complete list of the properties and districts on the National Register of Historic Places in Waseca County, Minnesota, United States. The locations of National Register properties and districts for which the latitude and longitude coordinates are included below, may be seen in an online map.

There are 12 properties and districts listed on the National Register in the county. A supplementary list includes one additional site that was formerly on the National Register.

This National Park Service list is complete through NPS recent listings posted August 1, 2025.

== Current listings ==
	Name on the Register	Image	Date listed	Location	City or town	Description
1	W. J. Armstrong Company Wholesale Grocers	W. J. Armstrong Company Wholesale Grocers	August 19, 1982 (#82003067)	202 2nd St., SW. 44°04′35″N 93°30′33″W	Waseca	Trackside warehouse built circa 1900, the best preserved building associated with Waseca's economic development as a rail transportation hub.
2	John W. Aughenbaugh House	John W. Aughenbaugh House	August 24, 1982 (#82003068)	831 3rd Ave., NE. 44°04′45″N 93°29′41″W	Waseca	Waseca's most architecturally prominent house associated with the local milling industry, built in 1897.
3	Philo C. Bailey House	Philo C. Bailey House	November 25, 1994 (#94001384)	401 2nd Ave. NE. 44°04′43″N 93°30′11″W	Waseca	House occupied 1872–1907 by a local pioneer, businessman, politician, and civic leader (1828–1907) involved in an unusually wide range of activities during Waseca's early development. Now houses the research library of the Waseca County Historical Society.
4	Hofmann Apiaries	Hofmann Apiaries	January 19, 2016 (#15000982)	4661 420th Ave. 44°10′04″N 93°40′25″W	Janesville	Unusually intact apiary with ten contributing properties from the period 1907–1933; one of the Upper Midwest's leading honey producers and widely recognized for its innovative beekeeping and processing techniques.
5	Janesville Free Public Library	Janesville Free Public Library	August 19, 1982 (#82003065)	102 W. 2nd St. 44°07′03″N 93°42′28″W	Janesville	Well-preserved 1912 example of a Carnegie library; also noted for its Neoclassical architecture.
6	Seha Sorghum Mill	Seha Sorghum Mill	June 4, 1979 (#79003718)	43978 County Highway 5; 44°11′38″N 93°39′00″W	Janesville vicinity	Minnesota's only surviving sorghum syrup mill, active circa 1904–1956, and a symbol of the region's agriculture and industry.
7	Strangers Refuge Lodge Number 74, IOOF	Strangers Refuge Lodge Number 74, IOOF	July 12, 2006 (#06000601)	119 S. Broadway Ave. 43°53′36″N 93°29′37″W	New Richland	1902 Independent Order of Odd Fellows hall, home of a large and important local fraternal organization and a key venue for a wide range of other groups and events. Now houses the New Richland Public Library.
8	Vista Lutheran Church	Vista Lutheran Church	November 8, 1982 (#82000565)	15035 275th Ave. 43°57′26″N 93°27′57″W	Otisco vicinity	1908 church, the best preserved symbol of Waseca County's principal Swedish American settlement, established in 1857.
9	Roscoe P. Ward House	Roscoe P. Ward House	August 19, 1982 (#82003069)	804 E. Elm Ave. 44°04′38″N 93°29′47″W	Waseca	Prominent 1896 house of a local leader in politics and finance.
10	Waseca Commercial Historic District	Waseca Commercial Historic District	January 10, 2020 (#100004864)	Centering on State St. between 3rd Ave. NE/NW and 2nd Ave. SE/SW; roughly bounded by 2nd St. NW/SW and the Canadian Pacific RR tracks 44°04′39″N 93°30′27″W	Waseca	Four-block central business district crucial to the development and evolution of Waseca County's economy, with 54 contributing properties built 1875–1960.
11	Waseca County Courthouse	Waseca County Courthouse	September 2, 1982 (#82003070)	307 N. State St. 44°04′47″N 93°30′28″W	Waseca	1897 courthouse, significant as the home of the county's government and for the role that achieving county seat status had on the development of the city.
12	William R. Wolf House	William R. Wolf House	August 24, 1982 (#82003071)	522 2nd Ave., NE. 44°04′42″N 93°30′01″W	Waseca	Waseca's best-preserved example—built circa 1895—of a successful merchant's house and of Queen Anne architecture. Now a bed and breakfast.

== Former listings ==
	Name on the Register	Image	Date listed	Date removed	Location	City or town	Description
1	Seth S. Phelps Farmhouse		October 21, 1982 (#82000564)	June 9, 1993	County Highway 2	Waseca vicinity	1869 Italianate farmhouse. Demolished in the 1990s.

== See also ==
- List of National Historic Landmarks in Minnesota
- National Register of Historic Places listings in Minnesota
