= Hofmann Apiaries =

- U.S. National Register of Historic Places
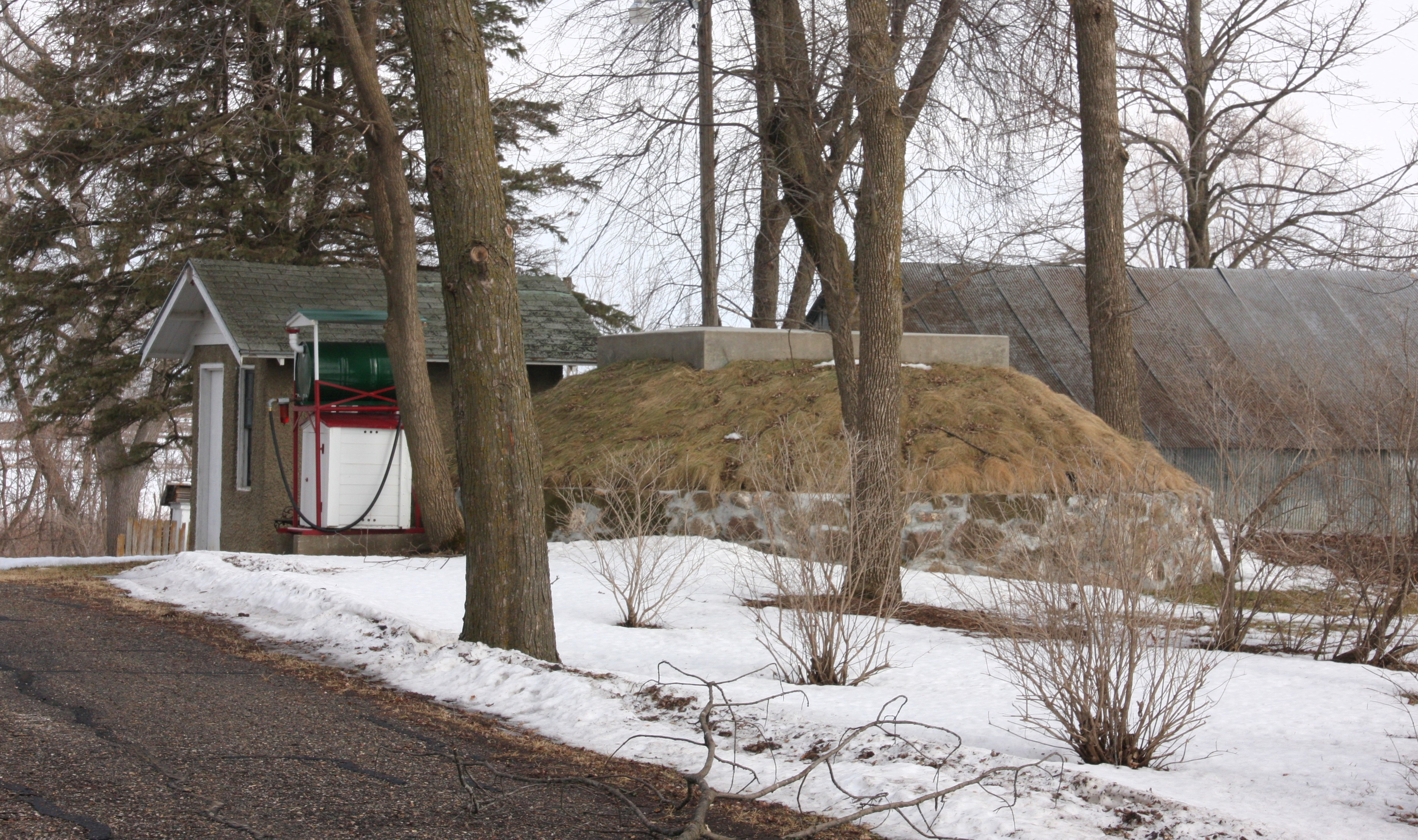
- The pump house, reservoir, and winter bee cellar at Hofmann Apiaries

- Location within Minnesota Location within the United States
- Location: 4661 420th Avenue, Janesville, Minnesota
- Coordinates: 44°10′4″N 93°40′25″W
- Area: 4 acres (1.6 ha)
- Built: 1907–1933
- Architect: Emil Hofmann
- NRHP reference No.: 15000982
- Designated: January 19, 2016

Hofmann Apiaries is a historic former apiary in Janesville, Minnesota, United States. It was established in 1907 as owner Emil Hofmann began developing beekeeping facilities on his existing farm. It was listed on the National Register of Historic Places in 2016 for its state-level significance in the theme of agriculture. The listing consists of 10 contributing properties, including the 1884 farmhouse and nine beekeeping facilities built 1907–1933. Hofmann Apiaries was nominated for achieving regional and national prominence in beekeeping for its innovative and influential practices.

== See also ==
- National Register of Historic Places listings in Waseca County, Minnesota
