= Roscoe P. Ward House =

Historic house in Minnesota, United States

- U.S. National Register of Historic Places
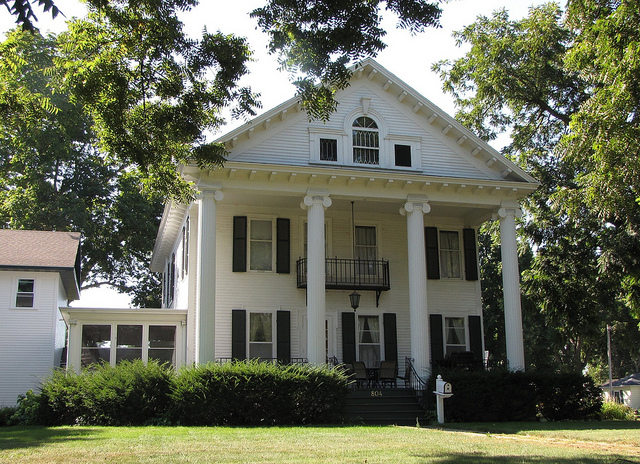
- The Roscoe P. Ward House viewed from the northeast

- Location within Minnesota Location within the United States
- Location: 804 East Elm Avenue, Waseca, Minnesota
- Coordinates: 44°4′38″N 93°29′47″W
- Area: Less than one acre
- Built: 1896–1897
- Architect: E.S. Stebbins
- Architectural style: Neoclassical
- NRHP reference No.: 82003069
- Designated: August 19, 1982

The Roscoe P. Ward House is a historic house in Waseca, Minnesota, United States. It was built from 1896 to 1897 and served as the family residence of a local leader in politics and finance. It was listed on the National Register of Historic Places in 1982 for its local significance in the theme of architecture, commerce, and politics/government. It was nominated for being Waseca's most prominent large residence and a manifestation of its commercial and industrial activity around the turn of the 20th century.

== See also ==
- National Register of Historic Places listings in Waseca County, Minnesota
