= Seha Sorghum Mill =

- U.S. National Register of Historic Places
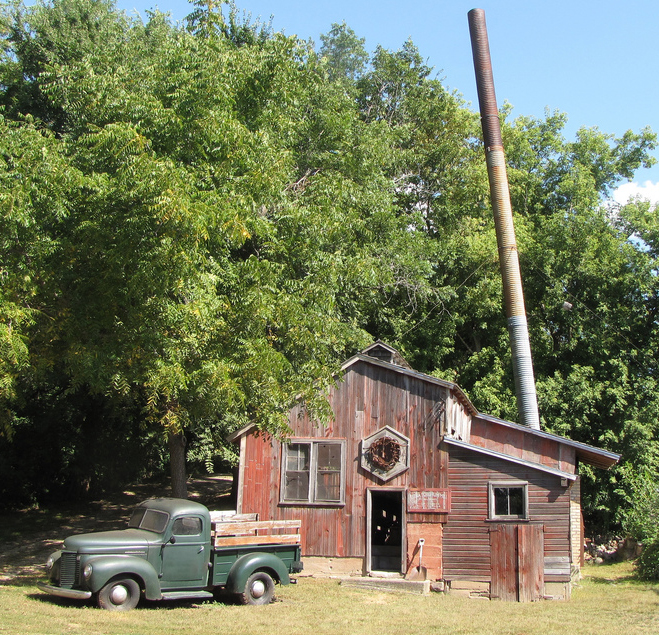
- The Seha Sorghum Mill from the west

- Location within Minnesota Location within the United States
- Location: 43978 County Highway 5, Janesville Township, Minnesota
- Coordinates: 44°11′37.8″N 93°39′0.2″W
- Area: Less than one acre
- Built: c. 1904–5, 1930s
- Built by: Cornelius L. Seha
- NRHP reference No.: 79003718
- Designated: June 4, 1979

The Seha Sorghum Mill is a historic sorghum syrup mill in Janesville Township, Minnesota, United States, in operation circa 1904 to 1956. It was listed on the National Register of Historic Places in 1979 for having state-level significance in the themes of agriculture, engineering, industry, and social history. It was nominated for being the only surviving early sorghum syrup mill in Minnesota and a symbol of the region's agriculture and industry. The building now stands on the grounds of the Okaman Elk Farm, a local visitor attraction.

== Description ==
The Seha Sorghum Mill stands on a farm about one mile (1.6 km) east of Elysian, Minnesota. It was built onto a low hill, allowing gravity to move the liquid through the various processing stages without the need for pumps. The oldest portion of the building is in the northwest corner, and includes the west-facing main door, three small windows on a south-facing eave, and the evaporator ventilator monitor along the roofline. Various lean-tos and additions have expanded the building, most notably an enclosure for the steam engine and boiler that is topped with a tall pipe chimney.

== Operation ==
By the 1930s the mill had largely achieved the configuration it exhibits today. Sorghum stalks were sent down a conveyor belt at the uphill, east-end of the complex and crushed in a three-cylinder roller mill. The juice crushed out of the stalks flowed into three defecation tanks, where it was heated with steam to remove impurities. From there the juice flowed into an evaporator trough, where it was boiled down into syrup. After being routed through a water cooler, the syrup was channeled into three wooden storage tanks until sale. The mill could process 50 US gallons (190 L) of syrup per hour.

The mill was powered by an old 16-horsepower steam engine constructed in the 1860s in Mankato, Minnesota. It operated the conveyor belt and roller mill while also providing the steam that heated the defecation tanks and evaporator. The boiler, a late addition, was fuelled with coal or wood.

== History ==
Sorghum syrup production began in Minnesota as early as 1860 and reached its peak in the 1880s. The south-central portion of the state, which includes Waseca County, generated three-quarters of Minnesota's annual output.

Cornelius L. Seha installed a permanent sorghum syrup mill on his farm around 1904 or 1905. The complex originally consisted of a single enclosed space for the evaporator, with the steam engine standing outdoors. In the 1930s the Seha family expanded the building, enclosing the engine and installing more processing equipment (most of it purchased used). The existing boiler was added in the 1940s. The mill ceased production around 1955 or '56.

== See also ==
- National Register of Historic Places listings in Waseca County, Minnesota
