= Philo C. Bailey House =

Historic house in Minnesota, United States

- U.S. National Register of Historic Places
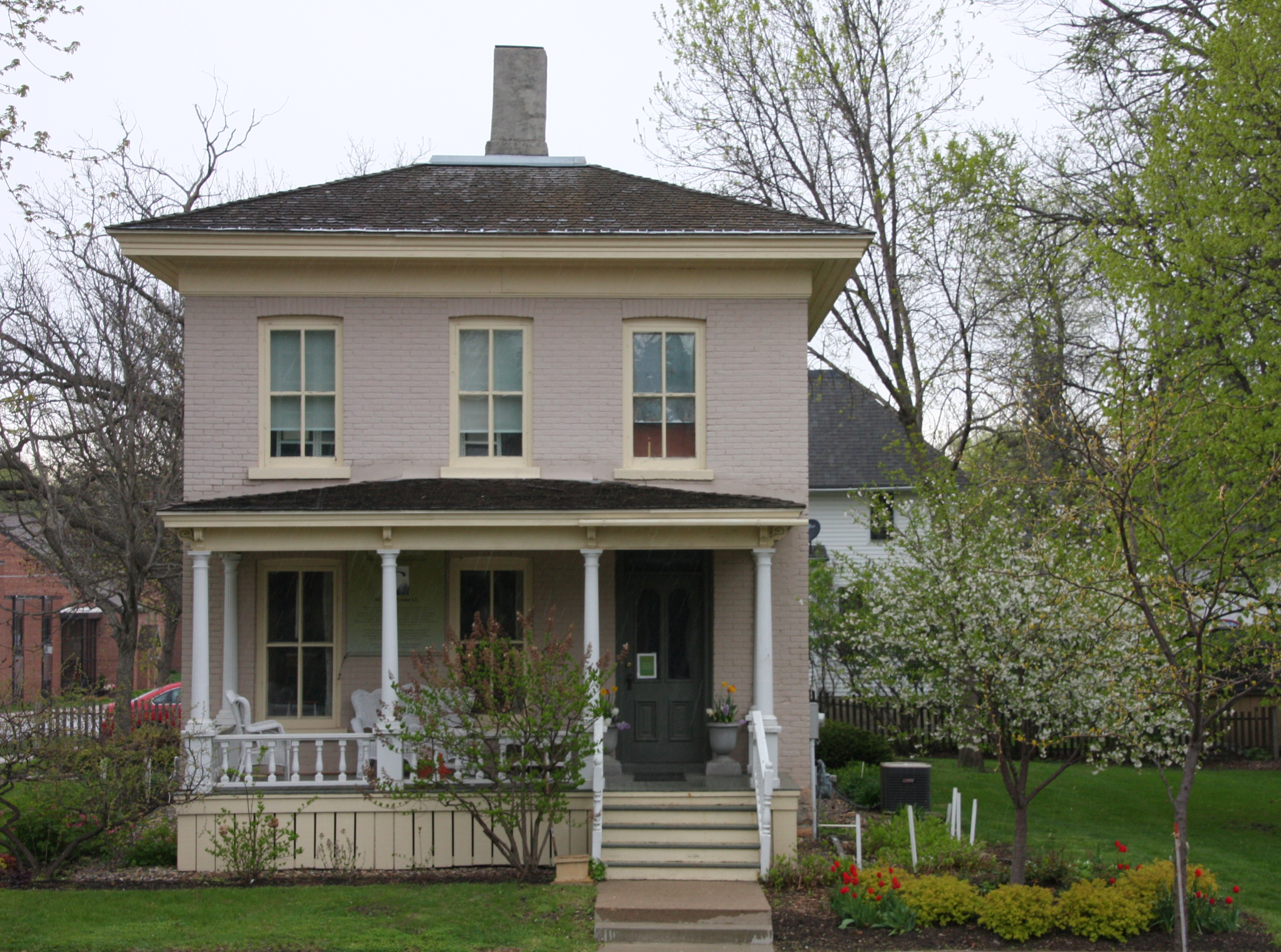
- The Philo C. Bailey House from the south

- Location within Minnesota Location within the United States
- Location: 401 2nd Avenue Northeast, Waseca, Minnesota
- Coordinates: 44°04′43″N 93°30′11″W
- Area: Less than one acre
- Built: 1868
- Architectural style: Italianate
- NRHP reference No.: 94001384
- Designated: November 25, 1994

The Philo C. Bailey House is a historic house in Waseca, Minnesota, United States, built in 1868. From 1872 until his death it was the home of Philo C. Bailey (1828–1907), a notable local pioneer, businessman, politician, and civic leader. The house was listed on the National Register of Historic Places in 1994 for having local significance in the themes of politics/government and social history. It was nominated for its association with Bailey, who was involved in a remarkably wide range of activities in the early years of Waseca's development. The building now houses the research library of the Waseca County Historical Society.

== See also ==
- National Register of Historic Places listings in Waseca County, Minnesota
