= George Peter Madden =

American politician (1887–1977)

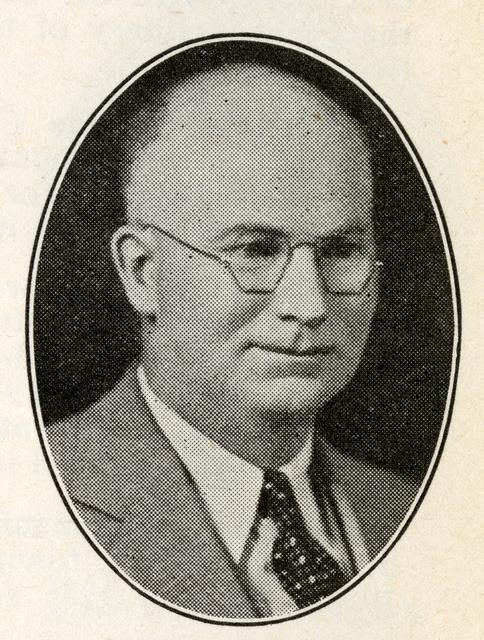

Member of the Minnesota House of Representatives from the 16th district
- In office January 8, 1935 – January 4, 1937

Personal details
- Born: March 6, 1887 Waseca, Minnesota, U.S.
- Died: June 11, 1977 (aged 90)
- Occupation: Politician, lawyer

George Peter "G.P." Madden (March 6, 1887 – June 11, 1977) was an American politician and lawyer who served in the Minnesota House of Representatives from 1935 to 1937, representing the 16th legislative district of Minnesota in the 49th Minnesota Legislature.

== Early life ==
Madden was born in Waseca, Minnesota, on March 6, 1887.

== Career ==
Madden served in the Minnesota House of Representatives from 1935 to 1937, representing the 16th legislative district of Minnesota in the 49th Minnesota Legislature.

During his time in office, Madden served on the following committees:

- Agriculture and Horticulture
- Civil Administration
- Commercial Transportation
- Elections
- Judiciary
- Public Buildings
- Public Health and Hospitals
- Taxes and Tax Laws

Madden's time in office began on January 8, 1935, and concluded on January 4, 1937. His district included representation for Waseca County.

Outside of the Minnesota Legislature, Madden was a lawyer; specifically, he was an attorney at law employed with the Gallagher, Madden and Gallagher Law Firm.

== Personal life and death ==
Madden was Catholic. He resided in Waseca, Minnesota.

Madden died at the age of 90 on June 11, 1977. His funeral was held at Sacred Heart Catholic Church.

Minnesota House of Representatives
Preceded by —	Member of the Minnesota House of Representatives from the 16th district 1935–1937	Succeeded by —
