= Thomas M. Neuville =

American judge and politician (1950–2022)

Member of the Minnesota Senate
- In office 1990–2008
- Preceded by: Clarence Purfeerst
- Succeeded by: Kevin Dahle

Personal details
- Born: January 31, 1950 Marinette, Wisconsin, U.S.
- Died: January 26, 2022 (aged 71) Northfield, Minnesota, U.S.
- Party: Republican Party of Minnesota
- Spouse: Marilynn
- Children: Mark, John, Anne, Luke, Meg
- Occupation: Attorney

Thomas M. Neuville (January 31, 1950 – January 26, 2022) was an American judge and politician.

Neuville served in the Minnesota Senate in the District 25 in the southeastern part of the state. The district includes the northern half of Rice County, all of Le Sueur County, the southern part of Scott County, and the eastern third of Sibley County. He was first elected on November 6, 1990, serving five full terms and part of a sixth, before resigning effective January 1, 2008, to accept appointment as a Minnesota district court judge. Neuville served as Minnesota district court judge until 2018.

Neuville's special legislative concerns included crime and public safety, prisons, child support reform, courts and judicial selection, health care reform, family, cultural and life issues. His Minnesota State Senate committee assignments included:

- Business, Industry and Jobs
- Finance
- Finance Subcommittee: Public Safety Budget Division, where he was the Ranking Minority Member
- Judiciary
- Rules and Administration Subcommittee: Ethical Conduct
- Rules and Administration Subcommittee: Permanent and Joint Rules

On November 28, 2007, the Minnesota governor's office announced that Neuville had been selected to fill a vacancy as a Judge for the Rice County District Court. He was sworn into office on January 10, 2008.

Neuville graduated with a B.A. in chemical engineering from Michigan Technological University in Houghton, Michigan in 1972, and later earned his J.D. in 1976 from William Mitchell College of Law in Saint Paul. Before becoming a judge, he was an attorney with Grundhoefer, Neuville & Ludescher, P.A. He was a longtime resident of Northfield, was married and had five children and 9 grandchildren.

Neuville died at his home in Northfield, Minnesota, on January 26, 2022, at the age of 71.
