= D. E. Bowe =

American politician

D. E. Bowe was an American politician. He was a member of the Wisconsin State Assembly.

== Biography ==
Bowe was born on December 16, 1881, near Waseca, Minnesota. He graduated from Waseca High School in 1901 before attending the University of Minnesota. In 1905, he graduated from the University of Minnesota Law School.

== Career ==
Bowe was elected to the Assembly in 1912. That year, he was also elected as an alderman and President of the Mellen, Wisconsin City Council. Other positions Bowe held include City Attorney of Mellen from 1907 to 1911. He was a Republican.
