= Janesville Free Public Library =

- U.S. National Register of Historic Places
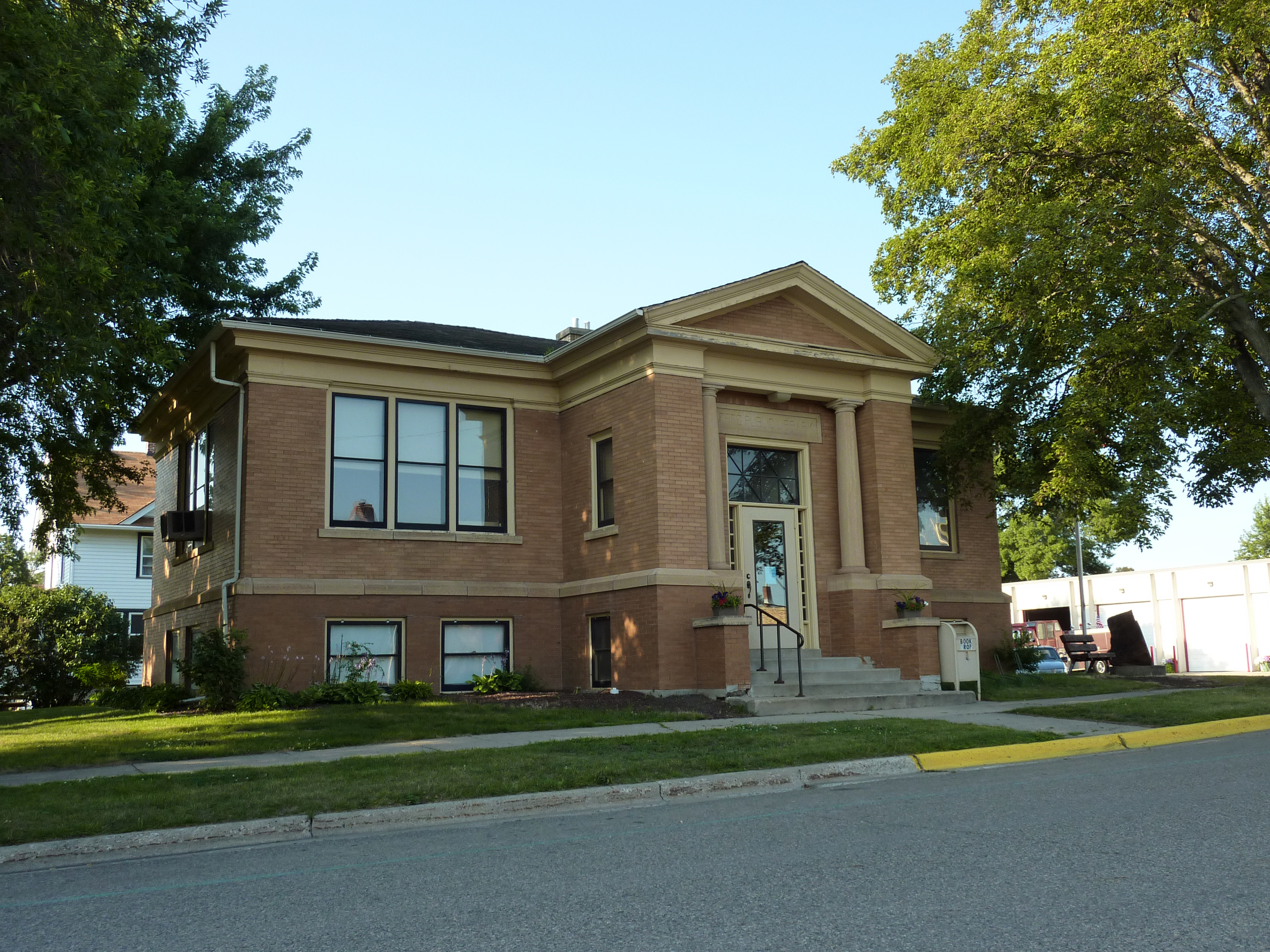
- The Janesville Free Public Library viewed from the southwest

- Location within Minnesota Location within the United States
- Location: 102 W. 2nd Street, Janesville, Minnesota
- Coordinates: 44°7′3″N 93°42′28.5″W
- Area: Less than one acre
- Built: 1912
- Architectural style: Neoclassical
- NRHP reference No.: 82003065
- Designated: August 19, 1982

The Janesville Free Public Library is the public library in Janesville, Minnesota, United States. It is housed in a Carnegie library building constructed in 1912. It is part of the Waseca-Le Sueur Regional Library System, which is a participant in the Traverse des Sioux Library System. The Janesville library building was listed on the National Register of Historic Places in 1982 for its local significance in the themes of architecture and education. It was nominated for being a well-preserved example of the 65 libraries founded in Minnesota by Andrew Carnegie's philanthropy, and for its Neoclassical architecture.

== See also ==
- List of Carnegie libraries in Minnesota
- National Register of Historic Places listings in Waseca County, Minnesota
