= W. J. Armstrong Company Wholesale Grocers Building =

- W. J. Armstrong Company Wholesale Grocers
- U.S. National Register of Historic Places
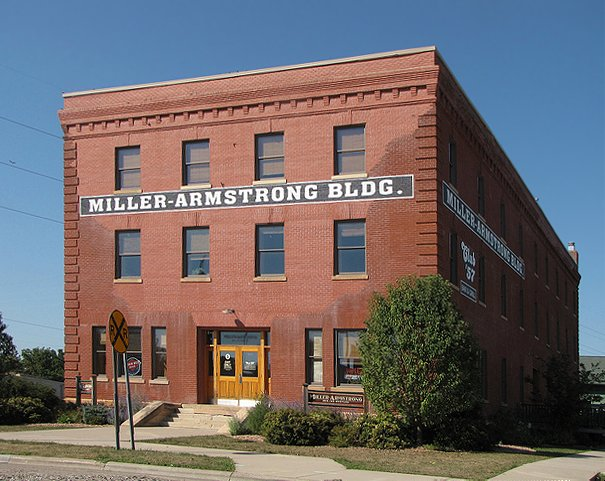
- The building from the east-northeast

- Location within Minnesota Location within the United States
- Location: 202 2nd Street Southwest, Waseca, Minnesota
- Coordinates: 44°4′35″N 93°30′33″W
- Area: Less than one acre
- Built: c. 1900
- NRHP reference No.: 82003067
- Designated: August 19, 1982

The W. J. Armstrong Company Wholesale Grocers Building is a historic warehouse in Waseca, Minnesota, United States, constructed around the year 1900. It was built to house a wholesale grocery business and placed to take advantage of the nearby Minneapolis and St. Louis Railway tracks. The building was listed on the National Register of Historic Places in 1982 for having local significance in the themes of commerce and transportation. It was nominated for being one of the best preserved trackside buildings associated with Waseca's economic development as a rail hub. The building is now part of the Miller–Armstrong Center, a redeveloped complex containing restaurants, a conference center, and lodging.

== Description ==
Constructed of red brick, the rectangular building rises three stories and has some decorative brickwork along the roofline. The property was designed with a small front lawn to blend into what was at the time a mixed commercial and residential neighborhood, owing to the early-20th-century need of workers to live close to their places of employment.

== History ==
Situated at the junction of the Winona and St. Peter Railroad and the Minneapolis and St. Louis Railway by 1867, Waseca quickly attracted many businesses and industries wishing easy access to rail transportation. W. J. Armstrong Company Wholesale Grocers built their warehouse around 1900, served by its own rail siding. The building continued to house a wholesale grocery business at the time of the property's National Register nomination in 1982, though truck transportation had long since replaced trains.

== See also ==
- National Register of Historic Places listings in Waseca County, Minnesota
