= Lewers =

Lewers is a surname. Notable people with the surname include:

- Benjamin Lewers (1932–2015), English Anglican priest
- Iain Lewers (born 1984), British field hockey player
- Margo Lewers (1908–1978), Australian artist
- Rick Lewers (born 1957/1958), Australian Anglican bishop
- Robert Lewers (1836-1926), American businessman at Hawaii

== See also ==
- Lewer
