= William R. Wolf House =

Historic house in Minnesota, United States

- U.S. National Register of Historic Places
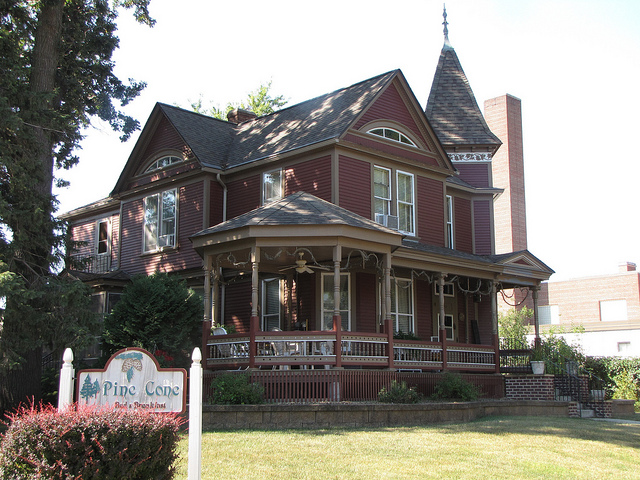
- The William R. Wolf House viewed from the northeast

- Location within Minnesota Location within the United States
- Location: 522 2nd Avenue Northeast, Waseca, Minnesota
- Coordinates: 44°4′41.5″N 93°30′1.5″W
- Area: Less than one acre
- Built: c. 1895
- Architectural style: Queen Anne
- NRHP reference No.: 82003071
- Designated: August 24, 1982

The William R. Wolf House is a historic house in Waseca, Minnesota, United States. It was built around 1895 and served as the family residence of a prominent local merchant and civic leader. It was listed on the National Register of Historic Places in 1982 for its local significance in the theme of architecture and commerce. It was nominated for being Waseca's leading example of the larger residences erected by its prosperous merchant class and of Queen Anne architecture.

The house currently operates as the Pine Gardens Bed and Breakfast.

== See also ==
- National Register of Historic Places listings in Waseca County, Minnesota
