= Vista Lutheran Church =

Historic church in Minnesota, United States

- U.S. National Register of Historic Places
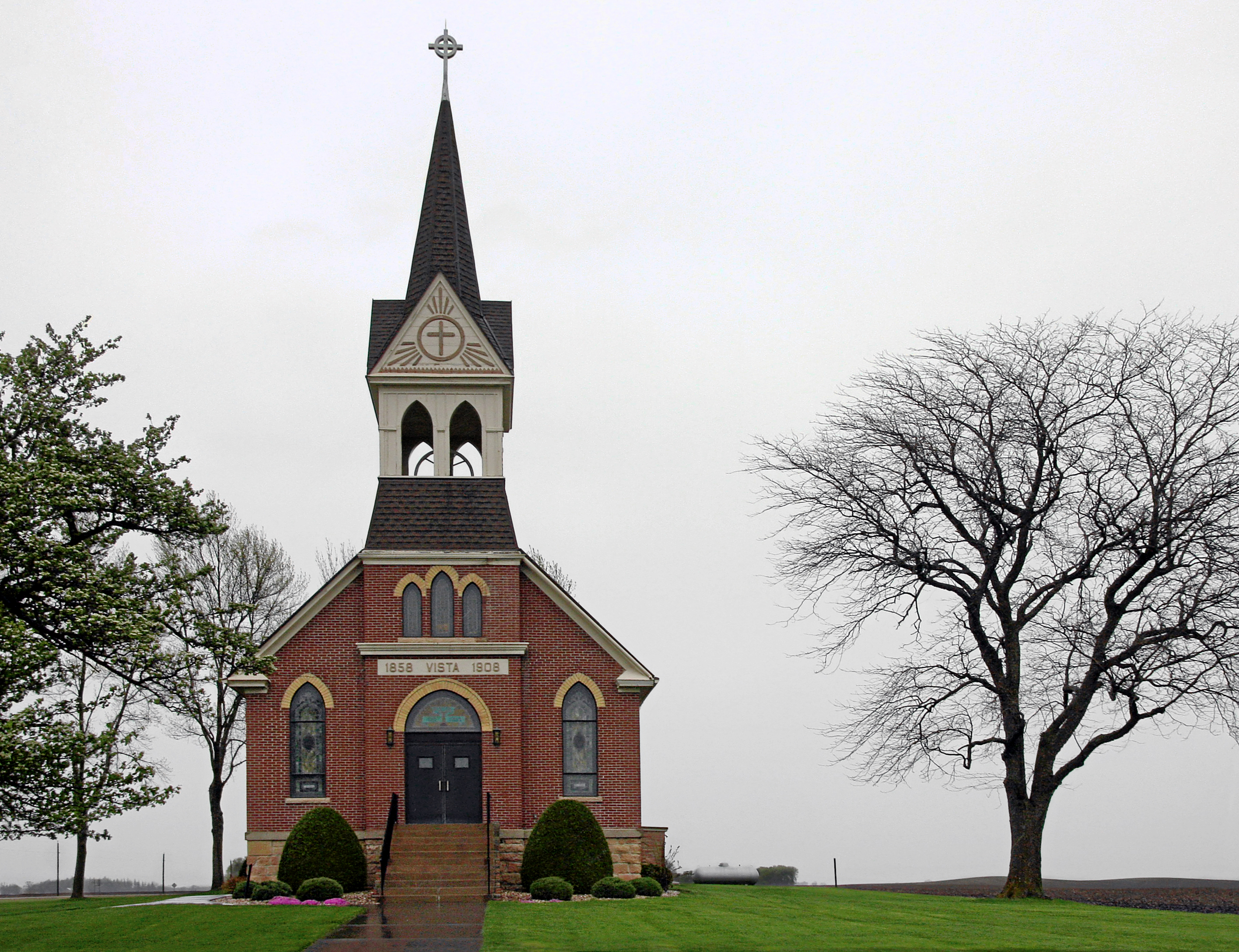
- Vista Lutheran Church viewed from the south

- Location within Minnesota Location within the United States
- Location: 15035 275th Avenue, Otisco Township, Minnesota
- Coordinates: 43°57′26″N 93°27′57.5″W
- Area: 2.5 acres (1.0 ha)
- Built: 1908
- Architectural style: Gothic Revival
- NRHP reference No.: 82000565
- Designated: November 8, 1982

Vista Lutheran Church is a historic church in Otisco Township, Minnesota, United States, built in 1908. The Gothic Revival building was listed on the National Register of Historic Places in 1982 for having local significance in the themes of religion and European heritage. It was nominated for being the best preserved structure symbolizing Waseca County's principal Swedish American settlement.

== History ==
Otisco and New Richland townships were settled by Scandinavian pioneers in 1856 and 1857. A wood-frame church was built on this site in 1868, and replaced in 1908 with this more permanent structure. The church was named for Vista Hundred, a geographical division of Sweden from which many of the settlers had come.

== Description ==
The interior has stenciling on the walls and the ceiling, and the carved pulpit sits high above the congregation. The exterior uses red brick and stone.

== See also ==
- List of Lutheran churches
- National Register of Historic Places listings in Waseca County, Minnesota
