= Waseca Junior and Senior High School =

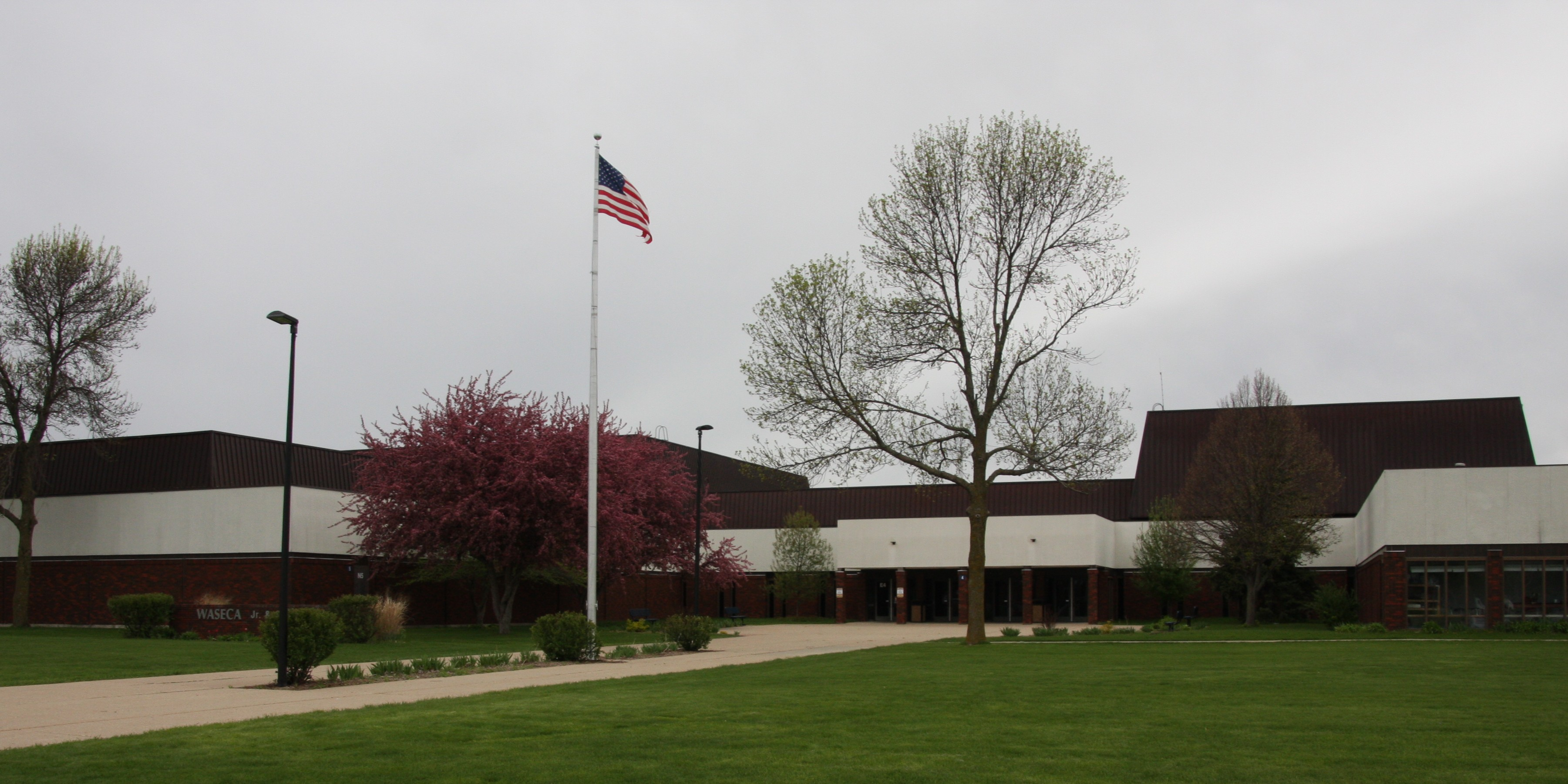
- Waseca High School in 2016

Location
- 1717 Second Street, N.W. Waseca, Minnesota, (Waseca County) 56093; United States
- Coordinates: 44°5′40″N 93°30′35″W

Information
- Motto: "We R4 The Bluejay Way": 1. Respect Yourself; 2. Respect Others; 3. Respect Property; 4. Respect Learning
- Principal: Jason Miller
- Teaching staff: 35.20 (FTE)
- Grades: 9–12
- Enrollment: 555 (2024-2025)
- Student to teacher ratio: 15.77
- Colors: Blue and gold
- Slogan: Think Blue, Achieve Gold
- Sports: Baseball, basketball, cheerleading, cross country, football, golf, gymnastics, hockey, soccer, softball, swimming, tennis, track and field, volleyball, wrestling
- Team name: Bluejays
- Website: https://www.waseca.k12.mn.us/o/wjsh

Waseca Junior and Senior High School (WJSH) is located in Waseca, Minnesota, United States. The school mascot is the bluejay and the school colors are blue and gold. It houses approximately 1,000 students in grades 7 through 12. They offer a rigorous curriculum which meets Minnesota standards. They also offer Post-Secondary Enrollment Options (PSEO) including College in the Schools and Advanced Placement courses. Jason Miller is the current principal.

== Activities ==
There are many different activities and clubs at WJSH:

- Spanish Club
- FFA
- Science Olympiad
- National Honor Society (NHS)
- Fall, Spring, and One-Act Plays
- Student Council
- Math Team
- Marching Band
- Link Crew
- Chess Club
- Speech Team
- Ski Team
- Art Club
- International Thespian Society (ITS)
- Business Professional of America (BPA)
- Programming Club
- Art Team
- Show Choir
- DECA
- Law Team
- Yearbook

== Music program ==
Choir is a program open to all students. Concert Choir is a group of students in grades 9 through 12 and anyone can join. Select Choir is open to students in grades 10 through 12 and is an audition only group.

Showchoir is a branch of the choir program and participation requires the involvement in either Concert or Select Choir. Showchoir groups are also audition only. There are four showchoir groups:

- State Street (Co-ed, 10th through 12th grade)
- Sextets (6 boys and 6 girls, 10th through 12th grade)

Band is another big program open to all students. There is one jazz band, Jazz I. Students are encouraged every year to prepare a solo for local and state competition, students can also perform in ensembles that they can also take to local and state competitions. There is a symphonic and concert band as well. The marching band program consists of The Waseca Marching Jays. It includes the instrumental sections and a Colorguard section, and is known throughout the region for its tradition of excellence, pride, unity, and discipline. Waseca Marching Jays are 23 time grand champions at Sioux Falls Festival of Band.

== Planned shooting and bombing ==
In May 2014, a combined shooting and bombing plot was discovered and stopped. John David LaDue had planned to kill his family, set a fire, then bomb the school and shoot students. After local police were tipped off, they found bomb-making materials in a storage facility. LaDue was to be charged, as a juvenile, with attempted murder, possession of explosives and property damage. Later, all charges were dropped except for six counts of possession of an explosive device. Psychologists argued that LaDue, who was diagnosed Asperger syndrome and several other mental conditions, continues to pose a risk to society and requires extensive treatment. Witnesses for the prosecution argued that LaDue should be tried as an adult, because he could then receive treatment for a longer period of time. LaDue plead guilty to a single charge of possessing an explosive device; he was sentenced to ten years probation and required to undergo psychiatric treatment.

== Notable alumni ==
- D. E. Bowe, member of the Wisconsin State Assembly
- Gene Glynn, baseball player and coach
- Ernie Jessen, NFL player
