= John W. Aughenbaugh House =

Historic house in Minnesota, United States

- U.S. National Register of Historic Places
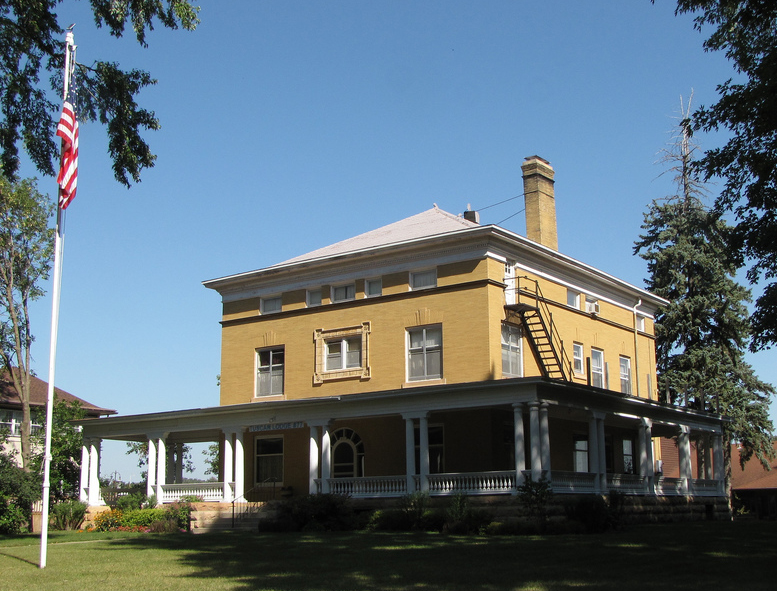
- The John W. Aughenbaugh House viewed from the south

- Location within Minnesota Location within the United States
- Location: 831 3rd Avenue Northeast, Waseca, Minnesota
- Coordinates: 44°4′45.5″N 93°29′41.2″W
- Area: Less than one acre
- Built: 1897
- Architectural style: Renaissance Revival
- NRHP reference No.: 82003068
- Designated: August 24, 1982

The John W. Aughenbaugh House is a historic house in Waseca, Minnesota, United States. It was built in 1897 and served as the family residence of a prominent local miller. It was listed on the National Register of Historic Places in 1982 for its local significance in the themes of architecture and industry. It was nominated for being Waseca's most prominent residence associated with the local milling industry.

== See also ==
- National Register of Historic Places listings in Waseca County, Minnesota
