= Joseph Alland =

American politician

Joseph Alland (July 4, 1894 – April 9, 1973) was an American farmer and politician.

Alland was born in Waseca, Waseca County, Minnesota. He went to the Waseca public schools and to the Canfield business College in Owatonna, Minnesota. He served in the United States Army during World War I and the Mexico Campaign. Alland lived in Hitterdal, Clay County, Minnesota. Alland served as the Hitterdal Township assessor. He also served on the Hitterdal School Board and was the school board clerk. He served in the Minnesota House of Representatives in 1943 and 1944.
