= John D. Lewer =

American politician (1886–1943)

John D. Lewer (February 9, 1886 – October 24, 1943) was an American farmer and politician.

Lewer was born on a farm in Woodville Township, Waseca County, Minnesota. He lived with his wife in Waseca, Minnesota and was a cattle and horse farmer. Lewer was also involved in the automobile and farm machine businesses. He served on some township offices and also served on the Waseca School Board. Lewer served in the Minnesota House of Representatives from 1923 to 1930 and in the Minnesota Senate from 1931 to 1934.
