= Rich Draheim =

American politician

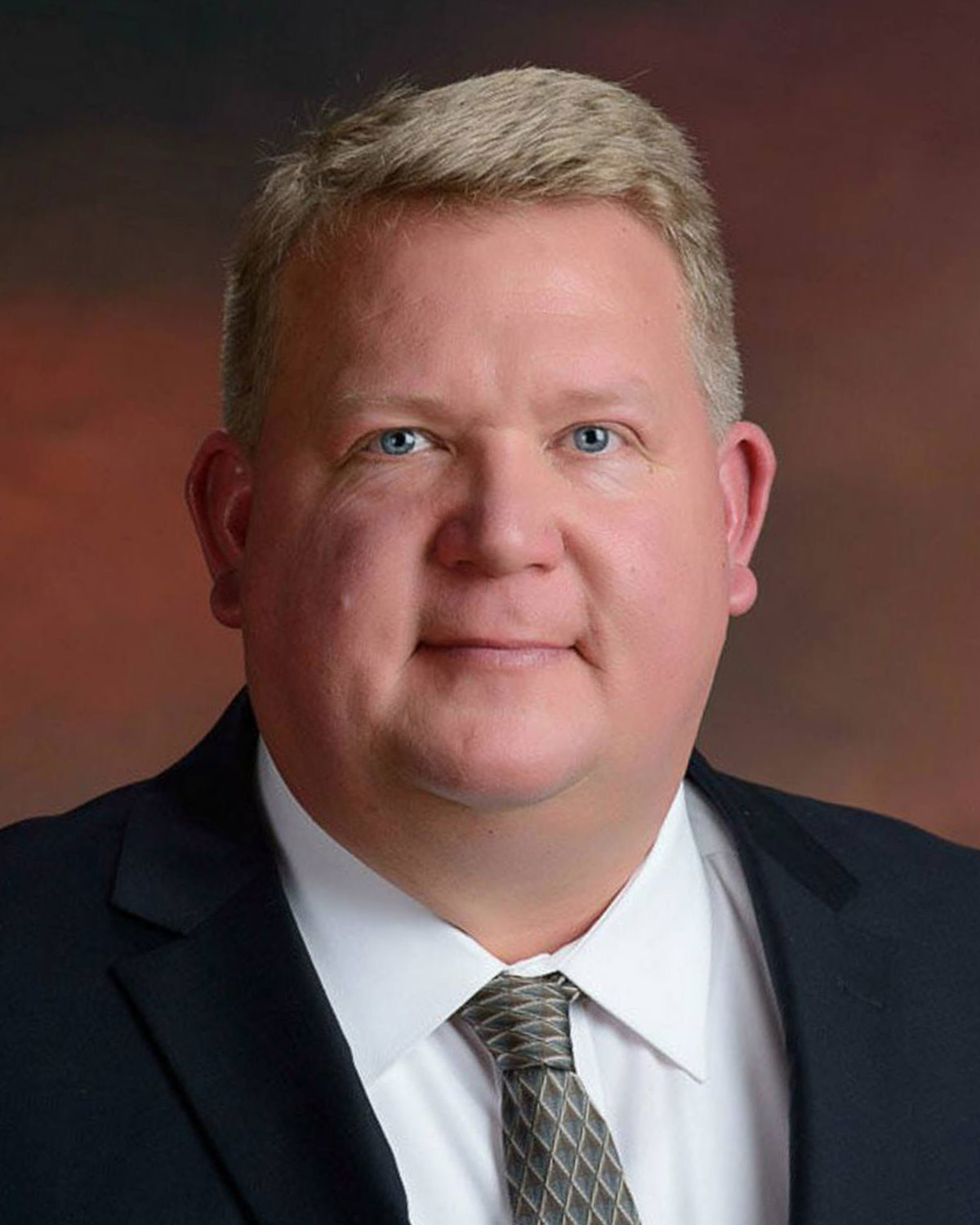

Member of the Minnesota Senate from the 22nd district
- Incumbent
- Assumed office January 3, 2017
- Preceded by: Kevin Dahle

Personal details
- Born: April 27, 1969 (age 57) Mankato, Minnesota
- Party: Republican Party of Minnesota
- Spouse: Lynnette
- Children: 2
- Education: Minnesota State University, Mankato
- Occupation: small business owner

Rich Draheim (/ˈdreɪhaɪm/ DRAY-hyme; born April 27, 1969) is an American politician and member of the Minnesota Senate. A member of the Republican Party of Minnesota, he represents District 22 in south-central Minnesota.

== Early life, education, and career ==
Draheim graduated from Minnesota State University, Mankato with a Bachelor of Science in 1994. He owns Weichert Realtors in Mankato. He previously owned the Westwood Marina in Kasota and the New Ulm Event Center, along with other business ventures.

== Minnesota Senate ==
Draheim was elected to the Minnesota Senate in 2016.

== Personal life ==
Draheim and his wife, Lynnette, have two children and reside in Madison Lake. He is a member of the Lutheran Church – Missouri Synod.
