= Kevin Dahle =

American politician (born 1960)

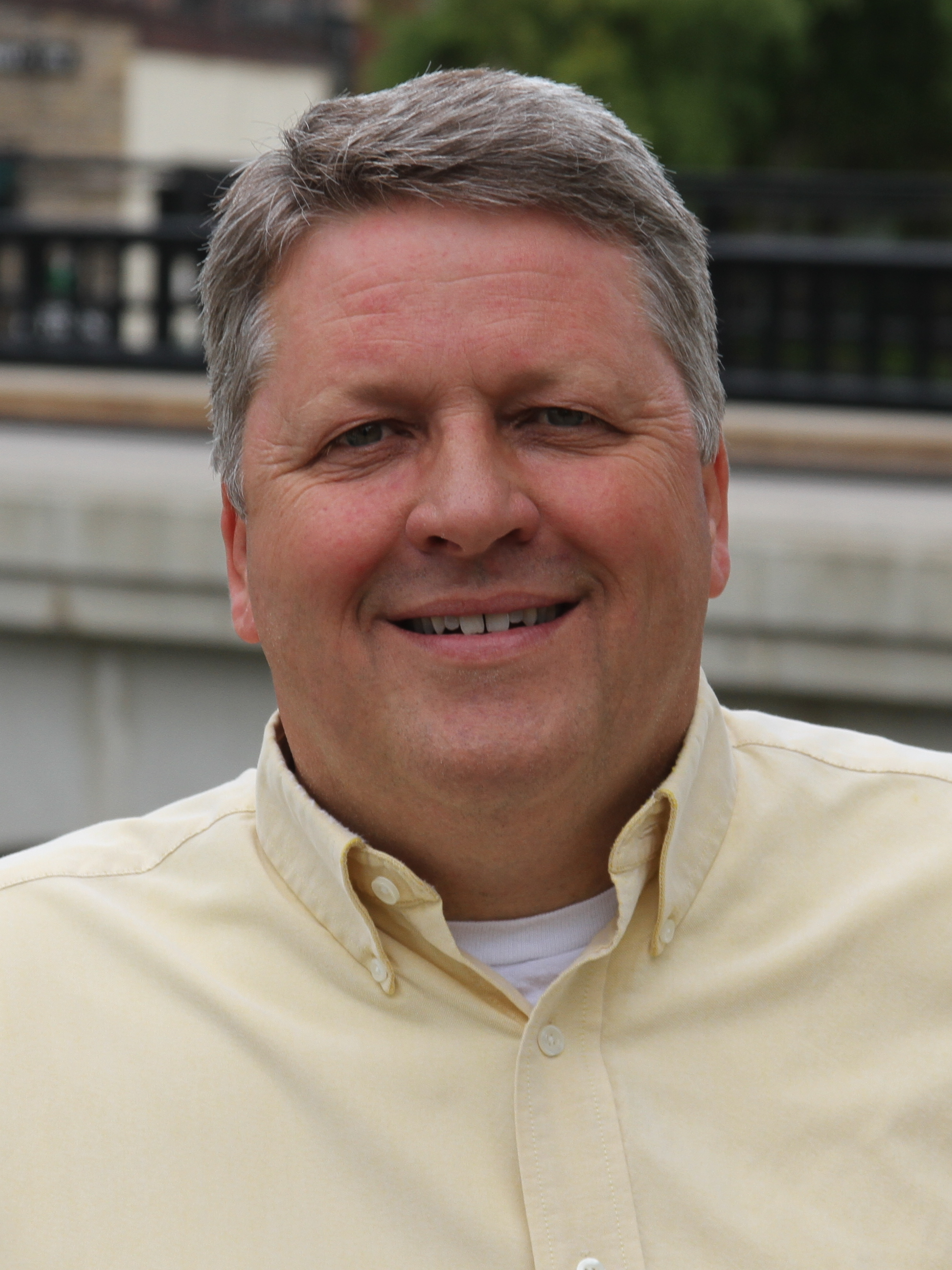

Member of the Minnesota Senate from the 20th district 25th (2008–2011)
- In office January 8, 2013 – January 2, 2017
- Preceded by: redrawn district
- Succeeded by: Rich Draheim
- In office January 22, 2008 – January 3, 2011
- Preceded by: Tom Neuville
- Succeeded by: Al DeKruif

Personal details
- Born: January 24, 1960 (age 66) Forest City, Iowa
- Party: Minnesota Democratic–Farmer–Labor Party
- Spouse: Beth
- Children: 3
- Education: University of Northern Iowa; St. Mary's University
- Occupation: Educator

Kevin L. Dahle (born January 24, 1960) is a Minnesota politician and former member of the Minnesota Senate. A member of the Minnesota Democratic–Farmer–Labor Party (DFL), he represented District 20, which included portions of Le Sueur, Rice, and Scott counties in the south central part of the state.

== Early life, education, and career ==
Dahle attended the University of Northern Iowa in Cedar Falls, graduating in 1982, and later attended St. Mary's University in Minneapolis, receiving his M.A. in education in 2004.

Dahle was a member of the Council of Local Presidents of Education Minnesota, a trade union representing local teachers in Minnesota, and was also president of the Northfield Education Association for approximately ten years. He previously worked with Citizens for Quality Education, and also worked for the U.S. Department of Education as a liaison in Ukraine, where he taught civic education. He is a social studies and driver's education teacher at Northfield High School in Northfield.

== Minnesota Senate ==
Dahle was first elected to the Senate in a special election held on January 3, 2008. The seat became vacant when Senator Tom Neuville resigned in order to accept an appointment by then-Minnesota Governor Tim Pawlenty as a district judge. He was subsequently unseated by Republican Al DeKruif in the 2010 general election. Dahle won a close race against Mike Dudley in 2012, and returned to the Senate representing District 20.

Dahle was a member of the Senate's Commerce and Consumer Protection Committee, the Education Committee, and the Energy, Utilities, Technology and Communications Committee. He also served on the Finance Subcommittee for the E-12 Education Budget and Policy Division. His special legislative concerns included E-12 education funding, health care, and transportation.

Dahle lost re-election to Republican Rich Draheim.
