= University of Minnesota Waseca =

Coordinates: 44°04′10″N 93°31′01″W

The University of Minnesota Waseca (UMW) was a two-year technical college specializing in agriculture and located in Waseca, in the U.S. state of Minnesota. A part of the University of Minnesota system, it operated from 1971 to 1992 and served nearly 20,000 students during that time. Their mascot was "Ramus" the ram. It maintained a college cable-FM radio station with the call letters KUMW. Its campus was previously an agricultural boarding high school known as the Southern School of Agriculture.

== History ==
=== Southern experiment station ===
The University of Minnesota has existed at this location since 1912. The university purchased 246 acres south and west of the city of Waseca.

=== Southern School of Agriculture ===
The Southern School of Agriculture was a boarding school for students who were primarily from farm families. It opened in 1953. The school term went for six months to allow time for students to participate in spring planting and fall harvesting.

=== Correctional Institution (present use) ===
After the closing of UMW, part of the campus was converted into a federal correctional institution, which currently houses only females. This institution once housed former Enron CEO Jeffrey Skilling. The remainder continues to operate as the university's Southern Research and Outreach Center.
