= Otisco Township, Waseca County, Minnesota =

Otisco Township, Minnesota
- Township
- Location within the state of Minnesota Otisco Township, Minnesota (the United States)
- Coordinates: 43°58′45″N 93°28′16″W
- Country: United States
- State: Minnesota
- County: Waseca

Area
  - Total: 36.0 sq mi (93.3 km^{2})
  - Land: 36.0 sq mi (93.3 km^{2})
  - Water: 0 sq mi (0.0 km^{2})
- Elevation: 1,155 ft (352 m)

Population (2000)
  - Total: 629
  - Density: 17/sq mi (6.7/km^{2})
- Time zone: UTC-6 (Central (CST))
  - Summer (DST): UTC-5 (CDT)
- ZIP code: 56093
- Area code: 507
- FIPS code: 27-49084
- GNIS feature ID: 0665235

Otisco Township is a township in Waseca County, Minnesota, United States. The population was 544 at the 2020 census.

== History ==
Otisco Township was organized in 1858. The township contains one property listed on the National Register of Historic Places, the 1908 Vista Lutheran Church.

== Geography ==
According to the United States Census Bureau, the township has a total area of 36.0 square miles (93.3 km^{2}), of which 0.03% is water.

== Demographics ==
As of the census of 2000, there were 629 people, 222 households, and 170 families residing in the township. The population density was 18.5 people per square mile (6.8/km^{2}). There were 230 housing units at an average density of 6.9/sq mi (2.6/km^{2}). The racial makeup of the township was 98.25% White, 0.16% Native American, 0.16% Asian, 0.95% from other races, and 0.48% from two or more races. Hispanic or Latino of any race were 1.43% of the population.

There were 224 households, out of which 36.9% had children under the age of 18 living with them, 68.9% were married couples living together, 4.5% had a female householder with no husband present, and 23.4% were non-families. 18.5% of all households were made up of individuals, and 5.0% had someone living alone who was 65 years of age or older. The average household size was 2.83 and the average family size was 3.23.

In the township the population was spread out, with 29.6% under the age of 18, 7.5% from 18 to 24, 28.6% from 25 to 44, 23.1% from 45 to 64, and 11.3% who were 65 years of age or older. The median age was 37 years. For every 100 females, there were 109.7 males. For every 100 females age 18 and over, there were 108.0 males.

The median income for a household in the township was $50,809, and the median income for a family was $55,357. Males had a median income of $35,855 versus $24,028 for females. The per capita income for the township was $17,310. About 2.9% of families and 2.5% of the population were below the poverty line, including 2.9% of those under age 18 and 3.0% of those age 65 or over.
