= Janesville, Minnesota =

City in Minnesota, United States

- City
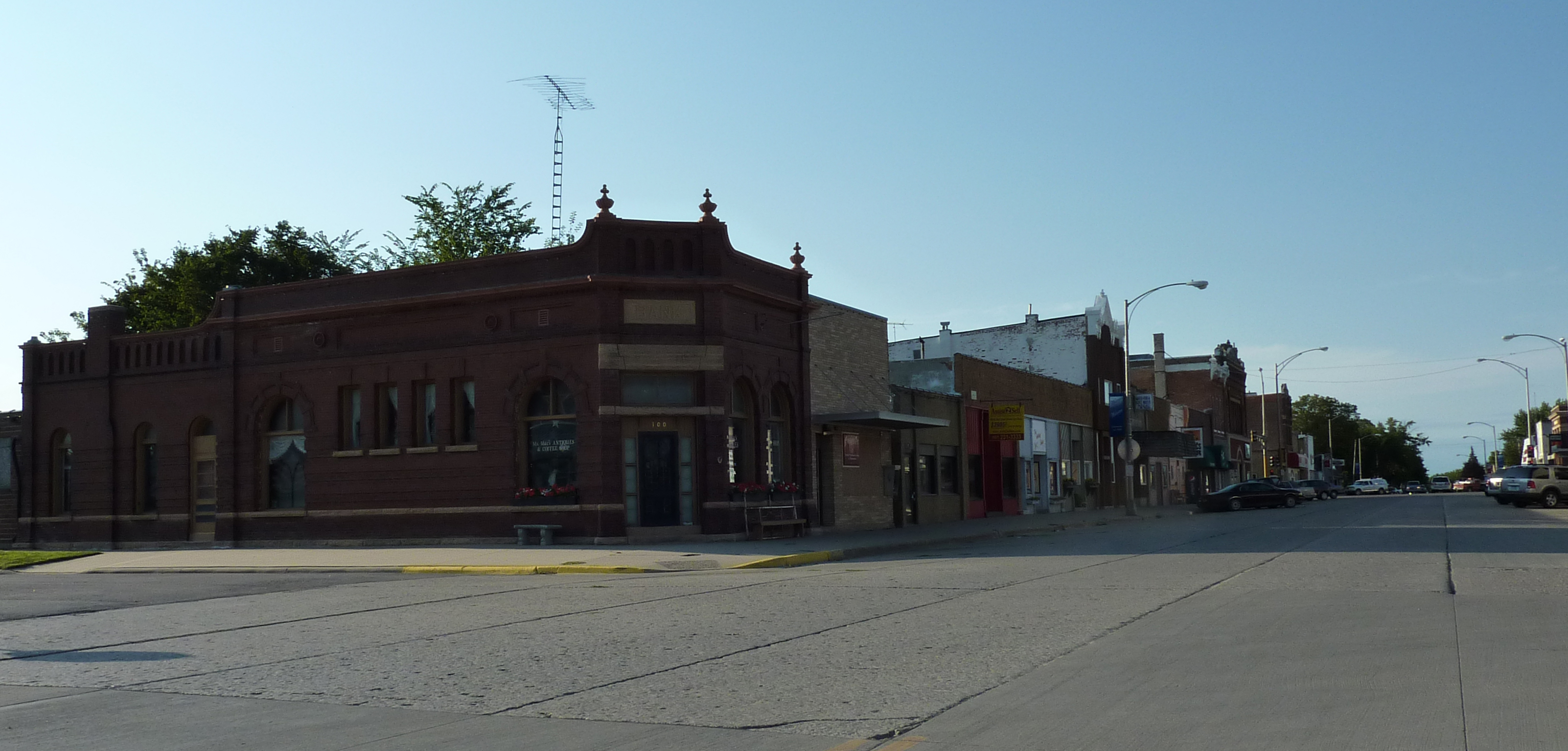
- Downtown Janesville
- Interactive map of Janesville, Minnesota
- Location within Minnesota Location within the United States
- Coordinates: 44.119846°N 93.709698°W
- Country: United States
- State: Minnesota
- County: Waseca
- Established: 1856
- Incorporated: 1870
- Named for: Mrs. Jane Sprague, an early settler

Government
  - Type: Mayor–Council
  - Mayor: Andrew Arnoldt
  - Councilmembers: Ivan Maas; Andy Ahlman; Sarah Johnson; Kyle Luitjens

Area
  - Total: 1.537 sq mi (3.982 km^{2})
  - Land: 1.537 sq mi (3.982 km^{2})
  - Water: 0 sq mi (0.000 km^{2}) 0.0%
- Elevation: 1,063 ft (324 m)

Population (2020)
  - Total: 2,421
  - Estimate (2024): 2,462
  - Density: 1,575/sq mi (608.0/km^{2})
- Time zone: UTC–6 (Central (CST))
  - Summer (DST): UTC–5 (CDT)
- ZIP Code: 56048
- Area codes: 507 and 924
- FIPS code: 27-31706
- GNIS feature ID: 2395455
- Website: janesvillemn.gov

Janesville is a city in Waseca County, Minnesota, United States. The population was 2,421 at the 2020 census, and was estimated at 2,462 in 2024.

U.S. Highway 14 serves as a main route in the community, running east–west, south of Janesville. County Road 3 runs north–south through the town. There is one disabled stoplight, now a four way stop, in Janesville at the intersection of County Road 3 (Main Street) and old Highway 14.

== History ==
The city of Janesville was established in 1856. A post office called Janesville has been in operation since 1858. The city was named for Mrs. Jane Sprague, an early settler. Janesville was incorporated in 1870. Janesville contains two properties listed on the National Register of Historic Places, the Hofmann Apiaries established in 1907 and the 1912 Janesville Free Public Library.

== Geography ==
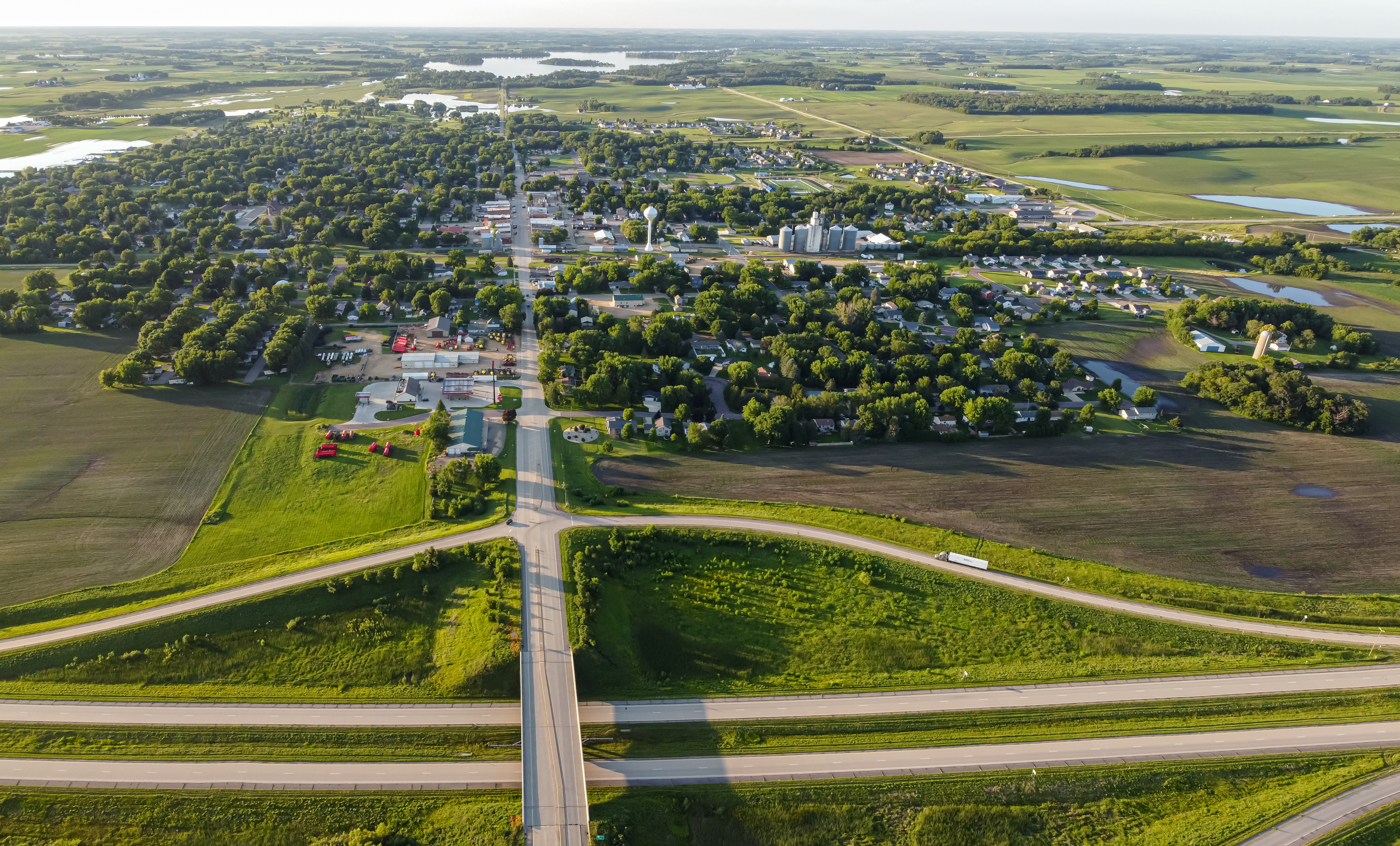

According to the United States Census Bureau, the city has a total area of 1.537 square miles (3.98 km^{2}), all land.

== Demographics ==
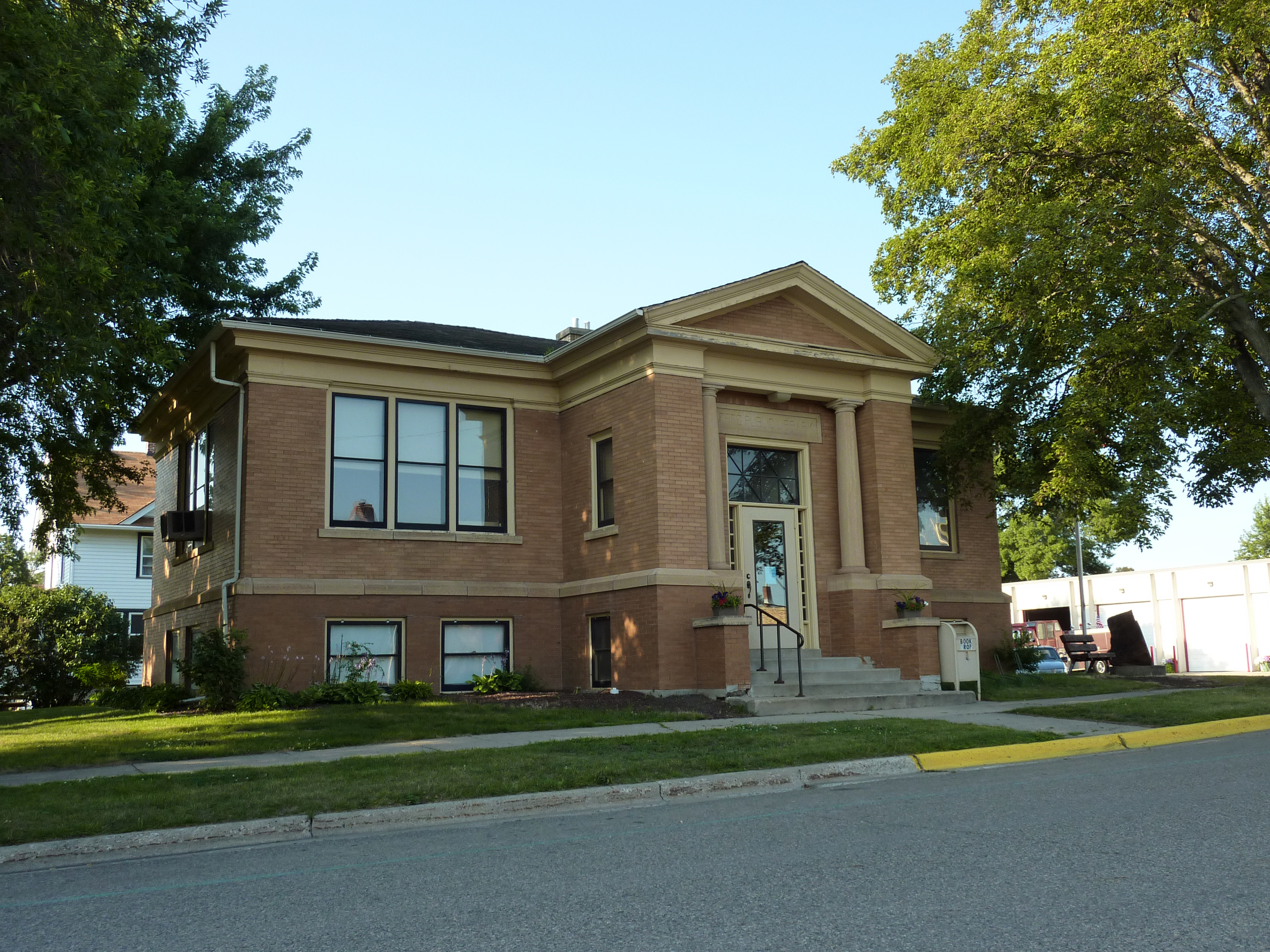
The Janesville Free Public Library, built in 1912 as a Carnegie library, is listed on the National Register of Historic Places.

Historical population
Census	Pop.	Note	%±
1880	1,021		—
1890	921		−9.8%
1900	1,254		36.2%
1910	1,173		−6.5%
1920	1,261		7.5%
1930	1,184		−6.1%
1940	1,296		9.5%
1950	1,287		−0.7%
1960	1,426		10.8%
1970	1,557		9.2%
1980	1,897		21.8%
1990	1,969		3.8%
2000	2,109		7.1%
2010	2,256		7.0%
2020	2,421		7.3%
2024 (est.)	2,462		1.7%
U.S. Decennial Census; 2020 Census

=== Racial and ethnic composition ===
Janesville, Minnesota – racial and ethnic composition Note: the US Census treats Hispanic/Latino as an ethnic category. This table excludes Latinos from the racial categories and assigns them to a separate category. Hispanics/Latinos may be of any race.
Race / ethnicity (NH = non-Hispanic)
Race / ethnicity (NH = non-Hispanic)	Population 1990		Population 2000		Population 2010		Population 2020	
Race / ethnicity (NH = non-Hispanic)	Number	Percent	Number	Percent	Number	Percent	Number	Percent
White alone (NH)	1,939	98.48%	2,046	97.01%	2,186	96.90%	2,232	92.19%
Black or African American alone (NH)	0	0.00%	2	0.09%	9	0.40%	14	0.58%
Native American or Alaska Native alone (NH)	3	0.15%	8	0.38%	6	0.27%	3	0.12%
Asian alone (NH)	6	0.30%	4	0.19%	4	0.18%	4	0.17%
Pacific Islander alone (NH)	—	—	0	0.00%	1	0.04%	4	0.17%
Other race alone (NH)	0	0.00%	0	0.00%	4	0.18%	6	0.25%
Mixed race or multiracial (NH)	—	—	15	0.71%	17	0.75%	85	3.51%
Hispanic or Latino (any race)	21	1.07%	34	1.61%	29	1.29%	73	3.02%
Total	1,969	100.00%	2,109	100.00%	2,256	100.00%	2,421	100.00%

=== 2020 census ===
As of the 2020 census, there were 2,421 people, 945 households, and 616 families residing in the city. The population density was 1,575.15 inhabitants per square mile (608.2/km^{2}). There were 990 housing units at an average density of 644.11 per square mile (248.7/km^{2}).

The median age was 37.0 years. 27.2% of residents were under the age of 18 and 16.1% of residents were 65 years of age or older. For every 100 females, there were 100.1 males, and for every 100 females age 18 and over, there were 97.0 males age 18 and over.

Households with children under the age of 18 comprised 33.5%. Among all households, 50.4% were married-couple households, 18.3% were households with a male householder and no spouse or partner present, and 23.7% were households with a female householder and no spouse or partner present. About 28.1% of all households were made up of individuals and 11.1% had someone living alone who was 65 years of age or older.

Of housing units, 4.5% were vacant. The homeowner vacancy rate was 1.2% and the rental vacancy rate was 7.2%.

0.0% of residents lived in urban areas, while 100.0% lived in rural areas.

=== 2010 census ===
As of the 2010 census, there were 2,256 people, 889 households, and 619 families residing in the city. The population density was 1,289.1 inhabitants per square mile (497.7/km^{2}). There were 958 housing units at an average density of 547.4 per square mile (211.4/km^{2}). The racial makeup of the city was 98.01% White, 0.44% African American, 0.27% Native American, 0.18% Asian, 0.04% Pacific Islander, 0.31% from some other races and 0.75% from two or more races. Hispanic or Latino people of any race were 1.29% of the population.

There were 889 households, of which 35.9% had children under the age of 18 living with them, 56.1% were married couples living together, 8.8% had a female householder with no husband present, 4.7% had a male householder with no wife present, and 30.4% were non-families. 25.1% of all households were made up of individuals, and 10.4% had someone living alone who was 65 years of age or older. The average household size was 2.49 and the average family size was 2.97.

The median age in the city was 35.4 years. 27.1% of residents were under the age of 18; 6.1% were between the ages of 18 and 24; 29.5% were from 25 to 44; 22.3% were from 45 to 64; and 14.8% were 65 years of age or older. The gender makeup of the city was 48.1% male and 51.9% female.

=== 2000 census ===
As of the 2000 census, there were 2,109 people, 816 households, and 580 families residing in the city. The population density was 1,653.3 inhabitants per square mile (638.3/km^{2}). There were 848 housing units at an average density of 664.8 per square mile (256.7/km^{2}). The racial makeup of the city was 97.72% White, 0.09% African American, 0.38% Native American, 0.19% Asian, 0.00% Pacific Islander, 0.62% from some other races and 1.00% from two or more races. Hispanic or Latino people of any race were 1.61% of the population.

There were 816 households, out of which 35.0% had children under the age of 18 living with them, 60.3% were married couples living together, 7.4% had a female householder with no husband present, and 28.9% were non-families. 25.5% of all households were made up of individuals, and 12.6% had someone living alone who was 65 years of age or older. The average household size was 2.54 and the average family size was 3.05.

In the city, the population was spread out, with 27.1% under the age of 18, 9.3% from 18 to 24, 28.4% from 25 to 44, 19.2% from 45 to 64, and 16.0% who were 65 years of age or older. The median age was 34 years. For every 100 females, there were 91.6 males. For every 100 females age 18 and over, there were 89.1 males.

The median income for a household in the city was $41,667, and the median income for a family was $51,111. Males had a median income of $31,675 versus $21,492 for females. The per capita income for the city was $17,443. About 1.4% of families and 3.7% of the population were below the poverty line, including 1.4% of those under age 18 and 7.9% of those age 65 or over.

== Notable person ==
- Aaron Sheehan, operatic tenor and professor of music
