= Waseca, Minnesota =

City in Minnesota, United States

Waseca
- City
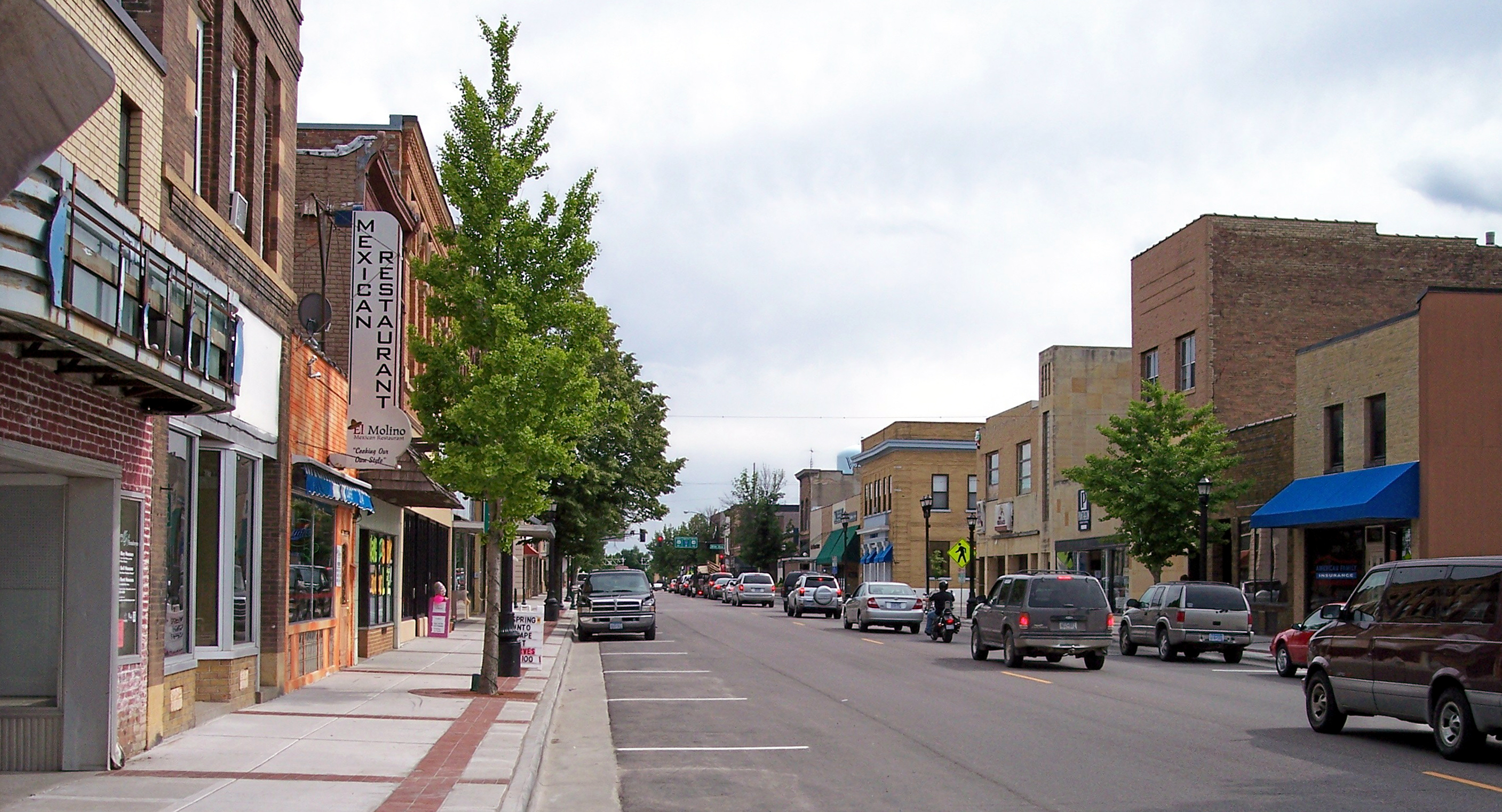
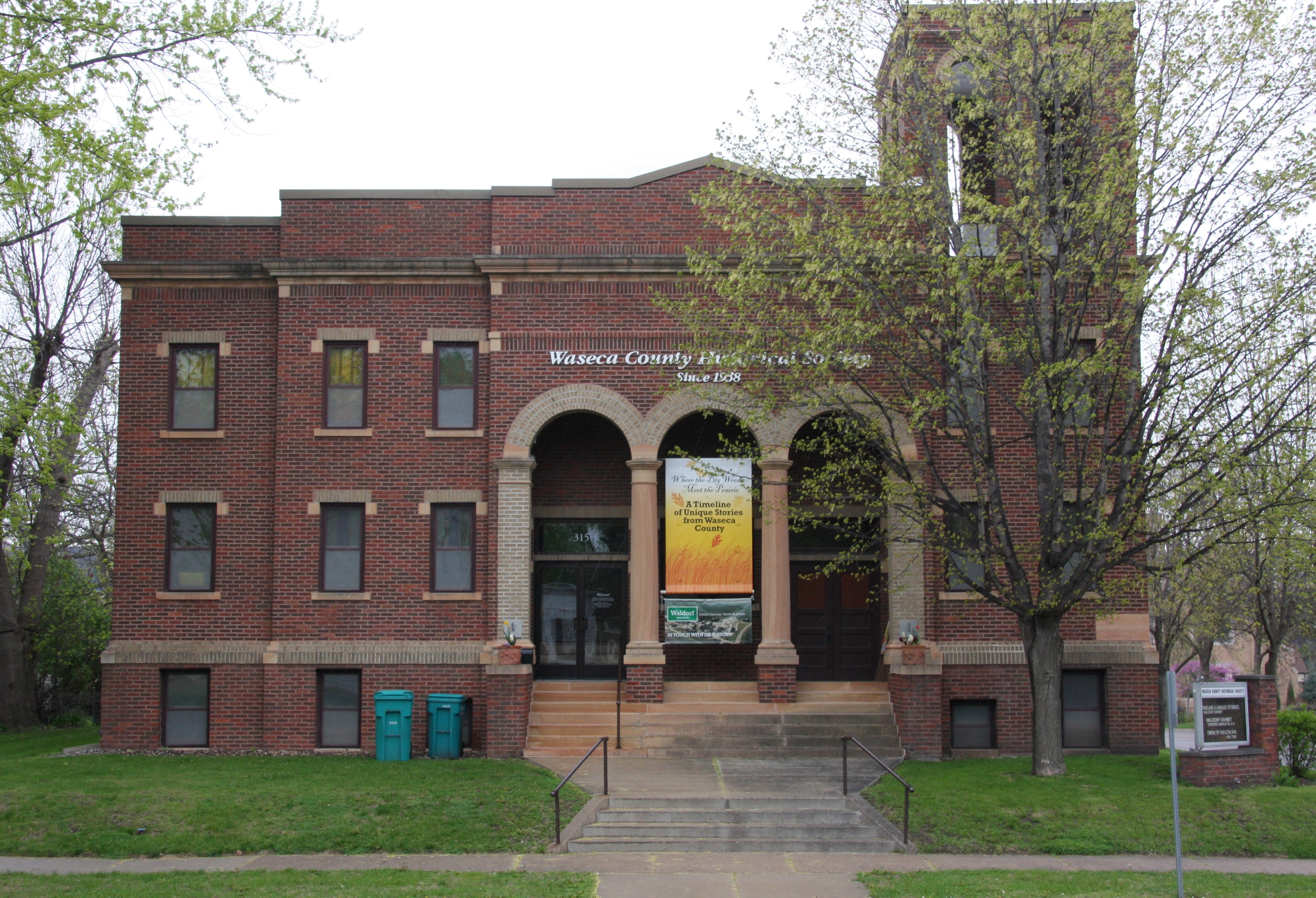
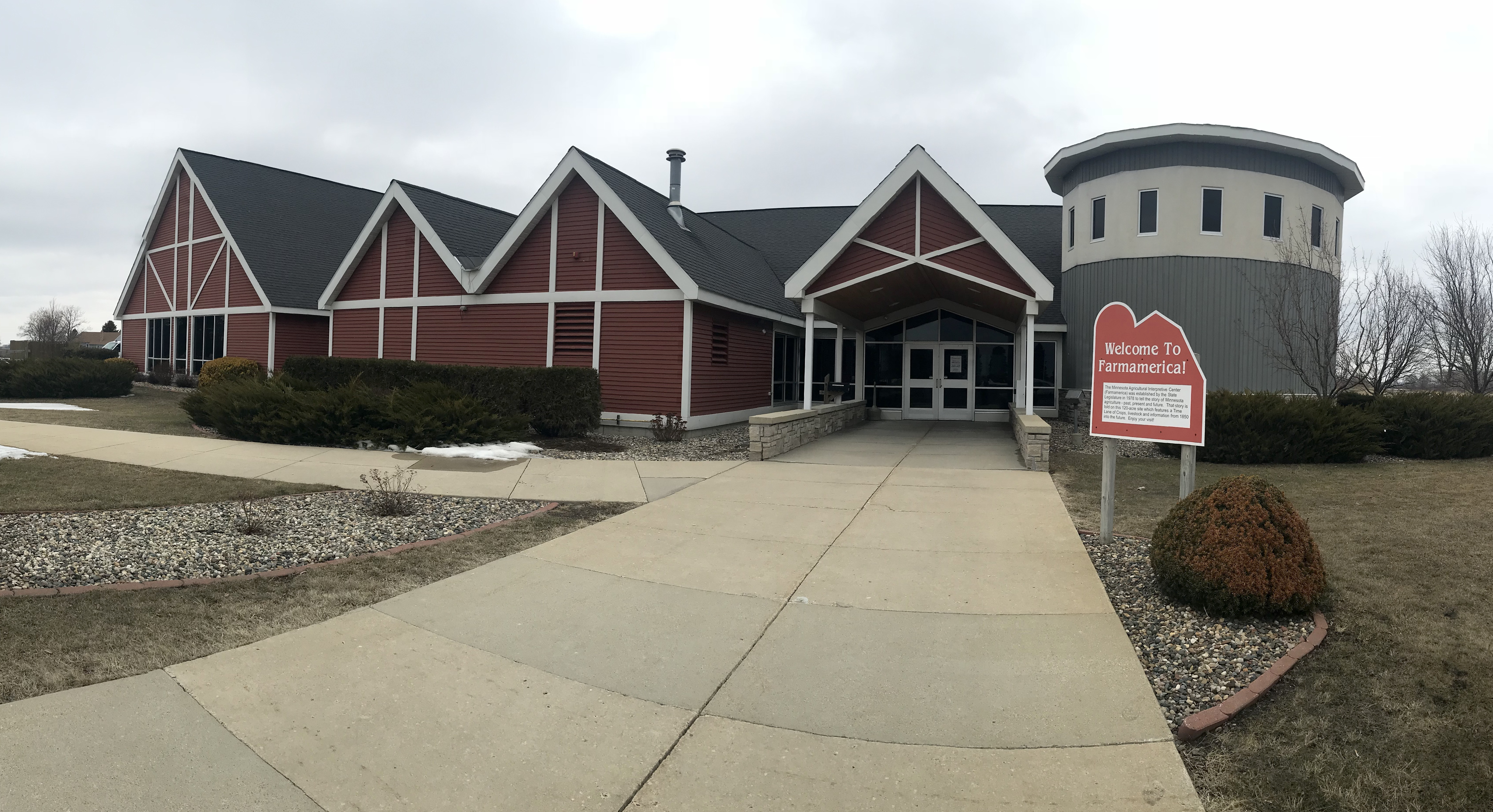
- Downtown Waseca County Historical Society FarmAmerica - Minnesota Agricultural Interpretive Center

- Location of Waseca within Waseca County and state of Minnesota
- Coordinates: 44°04′56″N 93°30′14″W
- Country: United States
- State: Minnesota
- County: Waseca
- Platted: July 1867
- Incorporated as a village: March 2, 1868
- Incorporated as a city: February 23, 1881

Government
  - Type: Mayor – Council
  - Mayor: Randy Zimmerman

Area
  - Total: 5.47 sq mi (14.17 km^{2})
  - Land: 4.29 sq mi (11.11 km^{2})
  - Water: 1.18 sq mi (3.06 km^{2})
- Elevation: 1,125 ft (343 m)

Population (2020)
  - Total: 9,229
  - Estimate (2022): 9,150
  - Density: 2,150.8/sq mi (830.42/km^{2})
- Time zone: UTC−6 (Central (CST))
  - Summer (DST): UTC−5 (CDT)
- ZIP Code: 56093
- Area code: 507
- FIPS code: 27-68296
- GNIS feature ID: 2397203
- Sales tax: 7.375%
- Website: ci.waseca.mn.us

Waseca (/wəˈsiːkə/ wə-SEE-kə) is a city in Waseca County, Minnesota, United States. The population was 9,229 at the 2020 census. It is the county seat.

== Geography ==
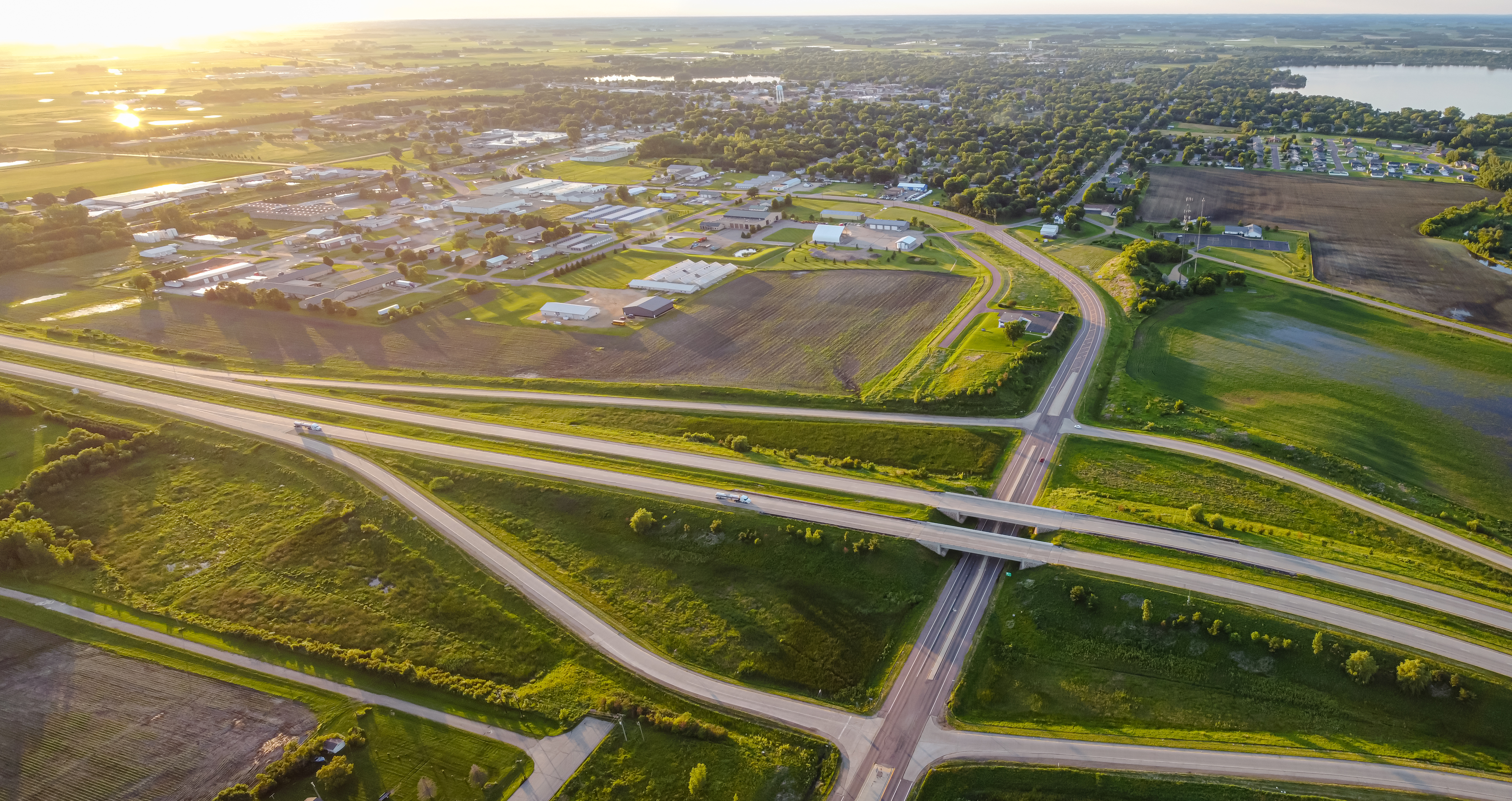

According to the United States Census Bureau, the city has an area of 5.19 square miles (13.44 km^{2}); 4.00 square miles (10.36 km^{2}) is land and 1.19 square miles (3.08 km^{2}) is water.

=== Climate ===
Climate data for Waseca, Minnesota (Southern Research and Outreach Center) (1991–2020 normals, extremes 1914–present)
Month	Jan	Feb	Mar	Apr	May	Jun	Jul	Aug	Sep	Oct	Nov	Dec	Year
Record high °F (°C)	62 (17)	69 (21)	84 (29)	92 (33)	106 (41)	105 (41)	106 (41)	103 (39)	100 (38)	93 (34)	80 (27)	68 (20)	106 (41)
Mean daily maximum °F (°C)	21.7 (−5.7)	26.4 (−3.1)	39.1 (3.9)	55.2 (12.9)	68.1 (20.1)	78.3 (25.7)	81.3 (27.4)	79.1 (26.2)	72.9 (22.7)	58.7 (14.8)	41.4 (5.2)	27.5 (−2.5)	54.1 (12.3)
Daily mean °F (°C)	13.2 (−10.4)	17.5 (−8.1)	30.7 (−0.7)	45.1 (7.3)	57.9 (14.4)	68.4 (20.2)	71.4 (21.9)	69.0 (20.6)	61.6 (16.4)	47.8 (8.8)	32.9 (0.5)	19.8 (−6.8)	44.6 (7.0)
Mean daily minimum °F (°C)	4.8 (−15.1)	8.7 (−12.9)	22.3 (−5.4)	34.9 (1.6)	47.8 (8.8)	58.6 (14.8)	61.4 (16.3)	59.0 (15.0)	50.4 (10.2)	36.9 (2.7)	24.4 (−4.2)	12.1 (−11.1)	35.1 (1.7)
Record low °F (°C)	−37 (−38)	−35 (−37)	−29 (−34)	−3 (−19)	19 (−7)	31 (−1)	39 (4)	34 (1)	20 (−7)	−1 (−18)	−21 (−29)	−35 (−37)	−37 (−38)
Average precipitation inches (mm)	1.27 (32)	1.20 (30)	2.25 (57)	3.30 (84)	4.47 (114)	5.38 (137)	4.93 (125)	4.82 (122)	4.12 (105)	2.77 (70)	1.89 (48)	1.50 (38)	37.90 (963)
Average snowfall inches (cm)	10.7 (27)	10.8 (27)	9.0 (23)	3.0 (7.6)	0.4 (1.0)	0.0 (0.0)	0.0 (0.0)	0.0 (0.0)	0.0 (0.0)	0.7 (1.8)	5.8 (15)	11.9 (30)	52.3 (133)
Average precipitation days (≥ 0.01 in)	8.8	7.7	9.7	12.0	14.1	13.3	10.9	10.9	9.7	9.9	8.1	9.1	124.2
Average snowy days (≥ 0.1 in)	7.9	6.7	4.8	1.6	0.1	0.0	0.0	0.0	0.0	0.6	3.4	7.6	32.7
Source: NOAA

== Demographics ==
Historical population
Census	Pop.	Note	%±
1870	551		—
1880	1,708		210.0%
1890	2,482		45.3%
1900	3,103		25.0%
1910	3,054		−1.6%
1920	3,908		28.0%
1930	3,815		−2.4%
1940	4,270		11.9%
1950	4,927		15.4%
1960	5,898		19.7%
1970	6,789		15.1%
1980	8,219		21.1%
1990	8,385		2.0%
2000	8,493		1.3%
2010	9,410		10.8%
2020	9,229		−1.9%
2022 (est.)	9,150		−0.9%
U.S. Decennial Census; 2020 Census

=== 2020 census ===
As of the 2020 census, Waseca had a population of 9,229. The median age was 38.2 years. 22.7% of residents were under the age of 18 and 16.7% of residents were 65 years of age or older. For every 100 females there were 82.7 males, and for every 100 females age 18 and over there were 77.0 males age 18 and over.

99.6% of residents lived in urban areas, while 0.4% lived in rural areas.

There were 3,607 households in Waseca, of which 28.5% had children under the age of 18 living in them. Of all households, 41.6% were married-couple households, 19.9% were households with a male householder and no spouse or partner present, and 28.8% were households with a female householder and no spouse or partner present. About 33.4% of all households were made up of individuals and 15.1% had someone living alone who was 65 years of age or older.

There were 3,811 housing units, of which 5.4% were vacant. The homeowner vacancy rate was 1.2% and the rental vacancy rate was 4.8%.

Racial composition as of the 2020 census
Race	Number	Percent
White	7,817	84.7%
Black or African American	318	3.4%
American Indian and Alaska Native	140	1.5%
Asian	77	0.8%
Native Hawaiian and Other Pacific Islander	8	0.1%
Some other race	308	3.3%
Two or more races	561	6.1%
Hispanic or Latino (of any race)	1,010	10.9%

=== 2010 census ===
As of the 2010 census, there were 9,410 people, 3,504 households, and 2,150 families living in the city. The population density was 2,352.5 inhabitants per square mile (908.3/km^{2}). There were 3,818 housing units at an average density of 954.5 per square mile (368.5/km^{2}). The racial makeup of the city was 89.0% White, 3.7% African American, 1.5% Native American, 1.0% Asian, 2.3% from other races, and 2.5% from two or more races. Hispanic or Latino of any race were 9.0% of the population.

There were 3,504 households, of which 30.9% had children under the age of 18 living with them, 44.7% were married couples living together, 11.7% had a female householder with no husband present, 5.0% had a male householder with no wife present, and 38.6% were non-families. 32.9% of all households were made up of individuals, and 13.8% had someone living alone who was 65 years of age or older. The average household size was 2.33 and the average family size was 2.95.

The median age in the city was 36.5 years. 22.5% of residents were under the age of 18; 8.3% were between the ages of 18 and 24; 30.1% were from 25 to 44; 25.5% were from 45 to 64; and 13.4% were 65 years of age or older. The gender makeup of the city was 42.6% male and 57.4% female.

=== 2000 census ===
As of the 2000 census, there were 8,493 people, 3,388 households, and 2,219 families living in the city. The population density was 2,215.6 inhabitants per square mile (855.4/km^{2}). There were 3,563 housing units at an average density of 929.5 per square mile (358.9/km^{2}). The racial makeup of the city was 94.24% White, 1.39% African American, 0.35% Native American, 0.58% Asian, 0.05% Pacific Islander, 2.50% from other races, and 0.89% from two or more races. Hispanic or Latino of any race were 5.10% of the population.

The ancestral makeup of the city is 44.6% German, 21.3% Norwegian, 13.2% Irish, 5.2% English, 5.1% Swedish, and 4.6% French.

There were 3,388 households, out of which 34.0% had children under the age of 18 living with them, 50.6% were married couples living together, 10.8% had a female householder with no husband present, and 34.5% were non-families. 29.3% of all households were made up of individuals, and 11.8% had someone living alone who was 65 years of age or older. The average household size was 2.44 and the average family size was 3.02.

In the city, the population was spread out, with 27.0% under the age of 18, 9.4% from 18 to 24, 28.7% from 25 to 44, 19.4% from 45 to 64, and 15.6% who were 65 years of age or older. The median age was 36 years. For every 100 females, there were 92.6 males. For every 100 females age 18 and over, there were 88.1 males.

The median income for a household in the city was $39,554, and the median income for a family was $49,163. Males had a median income of $35,701 versus $22,837 for females. The per capita income for the city was $18,439. About 6.5% of families and 8.4% of the population were below the poverty line, including 12.5% of those under age 18 and 5.9% of those age 65 or over.

== Transportation ==
Bus service in Waseca is provided by Southern Minnesota Area Rural Transit (SMART). SMART operates one deviated fixed route and demand-response service.

U.S. Highway 14 and Minnesota Highway 13 are two of the main routes in the city. U.S. 14 runs as an east–west freeway bypass just south of Waseca, while Minnesota Highway 13 passes through the city as State Street, running north–south.

== Education ==
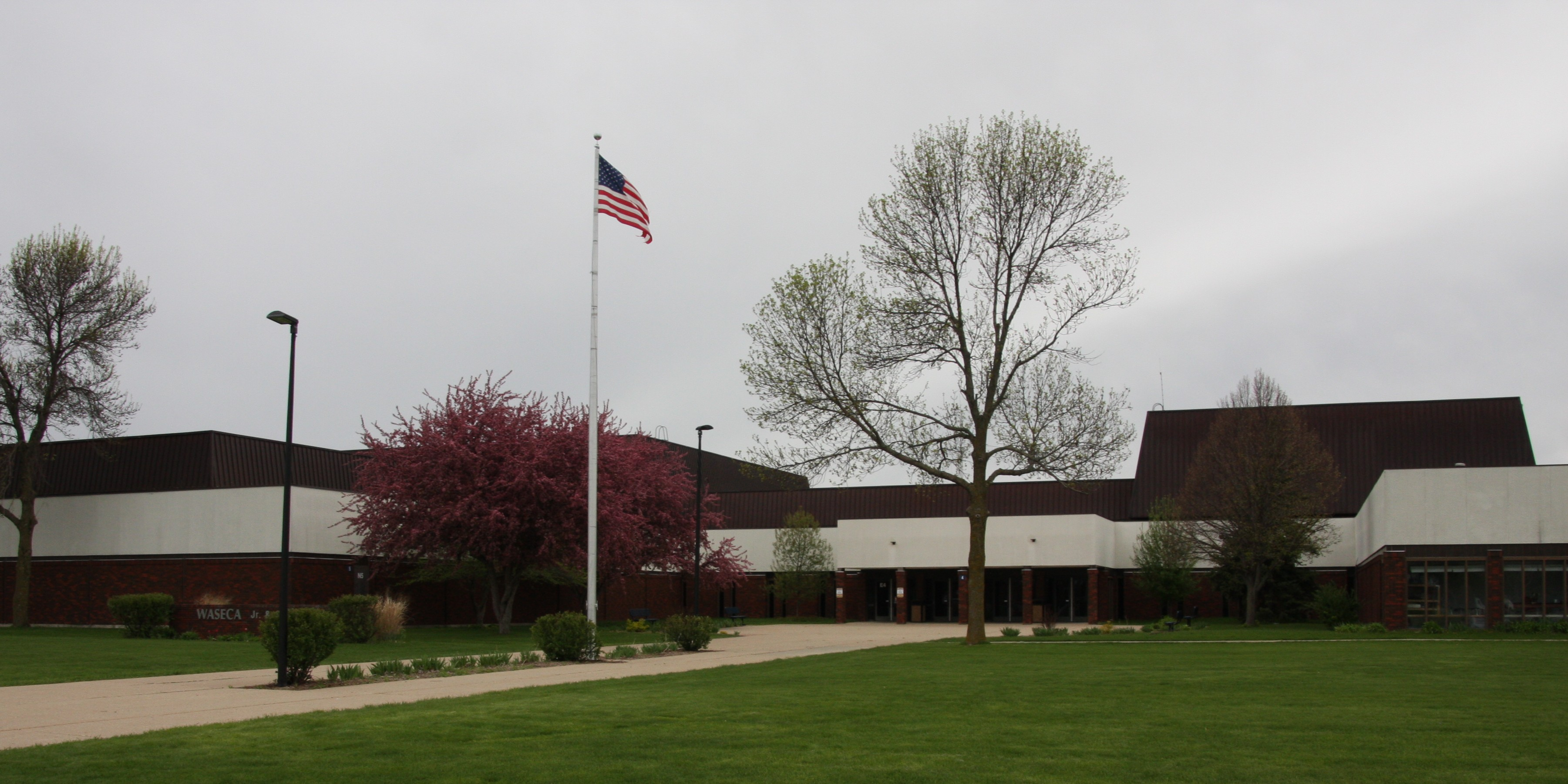
Waseca Junior and Senior High School

Waseca is home to many schools. The school colors are blue and gold and the school mascot is the bluejay.

Hartley Elementary School has kindergarten through 3rd grade.

Waseca Intermediate School (WIS), known as Central Immediate School (CIS) until 2012, holds 4th grade through 6th grade.

Waseca Junior and Senior High School (WJSHS), known as Waseca High School (WHS) until 2012, houses grades 7 through 12. WHS served only grades 9 through 12.

Waseca Alternative High School (WALC), also known as the Alternative Learning Center (ALC), has an alternative learning program for students junior-high age through adult.

Sacred Heart School is a private Catholic elementary school, ranging from kindergarten through fourth grade, in Sacred Heart Catholic Church. Sacred Heart also has a Montessori preschool. Another preschool, Hansel & Gretel, is at Faith United Methodist Church. Other preschools include Waseca County Head Start.

Waseca has a charter school, TEAM Academy, hosting students from kindergarten to grade 6. Until recently, the public schools sponsored TEAM Academy.

Waseca was home to the University of Minnesota Waseca, a two-year technical college that closed in 1992. Most of its former campus continues to operate as the research facility Southern Research and Outreach Center, which includes 926 acres of research-oriented farmland, a community garden, and the Hodgson Memorial Arboretum.

== Economy ==
Waseca is home to a frozen-vegetable packing plant for fresh peas and corn, owned by ConAgra Brands.

The Federal Correctional Institution, Waseca, a low-security federal prison housing female inmates, is in buildings that were part of the University of Minnesota Waseca campus.

Waseca is home to the Waseca Medical Center, part of the Mayo Clinic Health System.

== Recreation ==
Waseca opened a waterpark in June 2007.

Waseca completed an eight-foot-wide asphalt bike path surrounding Clear Lake in 2014.

Waseca is home to many parks and lakes, including Clear Lake, Loon Lake, Maplewood Park, Clear Lake Park, Loon Lake Park, Courthouse Park, and Blowers Park.

== History ==
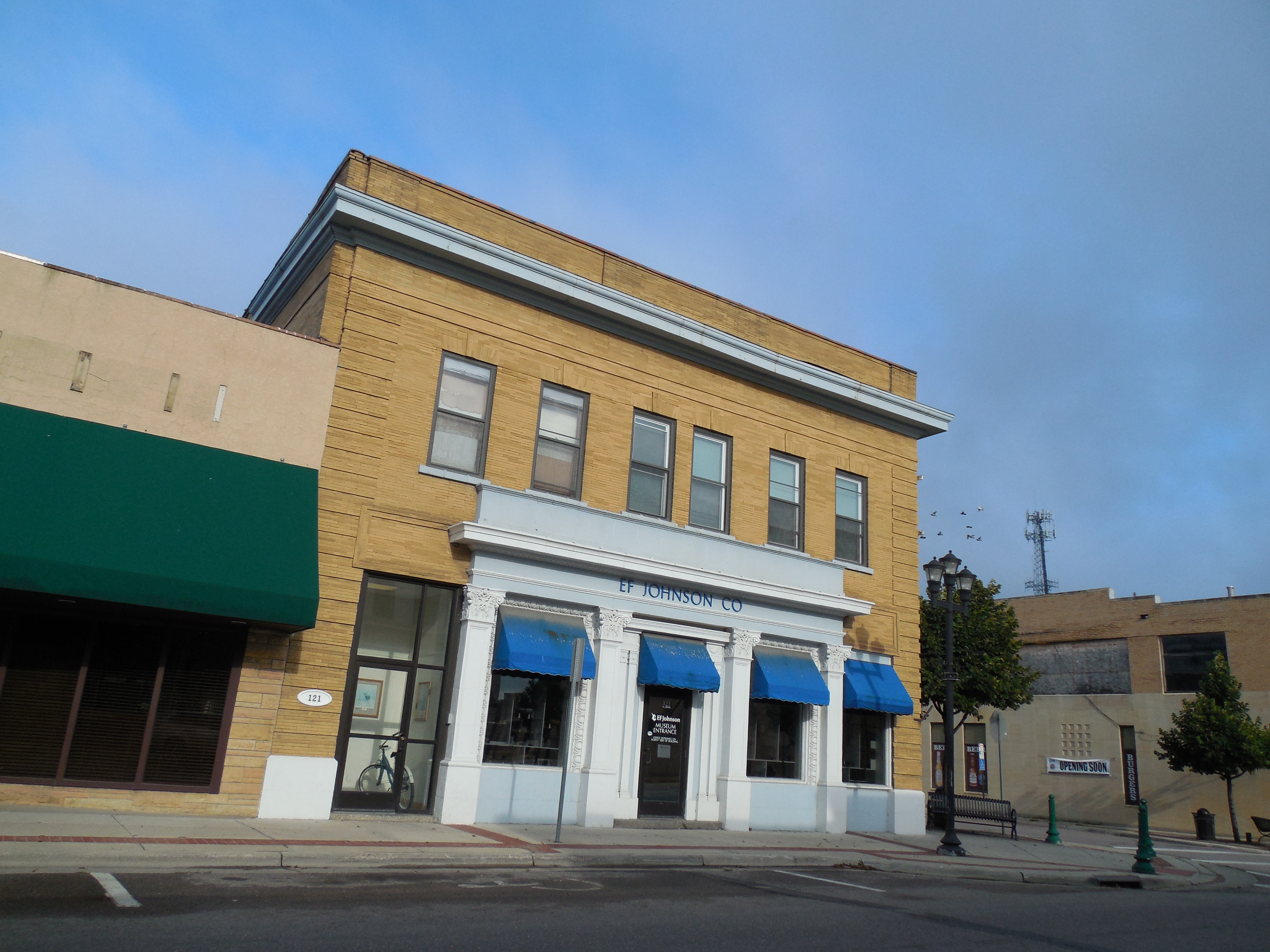
E.F. Johnson Building now a museum owned by the Waseca County Historical Society

Waseca was platted in July 1867 where the railroad system established a stop. Within a year it was a major shipping hub for wheat, and the city had 129 buildings and 700 people.

In 1912 the University of Minnesota purchased 246 acres of swampland and established an experimental farm called Southeast Station. Studies included corn, swine and cattle-breeding. In 1953 the university opened the Southern School of Agriculture for farming students. It operated as a boarding school, with a six-month term scheduled around farming activities. In 1971 it became the University of Minnesota Waseca, a two-year technical college, and served nearly 20,000 students before closing in 1992.

The city took its name from Waseca County, Minnesota. "Waseca" is a Dakota language word meaning "rich in provisions". It was founded as a hub of agricultural activity. In the mid-1900s, three companies were founded in Waseca with national markets: Brown Printing, EF Johnson Technologies Inc., and Herter's Outgoor Gear. The result was a strong, diverse economy. In the mid-1970s, Waseca's post office was the third busiest in the state for postal receipts.

In 1923, Edgar F. Johnson and his wife, Ethel Johnson, founded E.F. Johnson Co. It shared space with a downtown Waseca woodworking shop, and sold radio transmission parts by mail order. It built its first factory in 1936, and was a major supplier of defense production during World War II. Johnson merged with Western Union in 1982. In 1997, it was sold and its headquarters moved to Texas. The Johnsons played a major role in establishing Waseca County Historical Society.

George Herter launched Herter's in 1937 from his father's dry goods store and became an original model of successful mail-order retailers. Herter's merchandise is now sold by Cabela's and Bass Pro Shops. Herter's successful catalog business, including its print runs of 400,000 to 500,000 copies, were a major factor in Brown Printing's success. Brown Printing was started in 1949 and grew to include facilities in Illinois and Pennsylvania. It was sold to Quad Printing in 2015.

A post office has been in operation at Waseca since 1867. Waseca was incorporated as a city in 1881.

During the Second World War, the E.F. Johnson Company plant was on war footing, with production 24 hours a day and heavy surveillance. Waseca was one of the first cities to use municipal funds to buy war bonds.

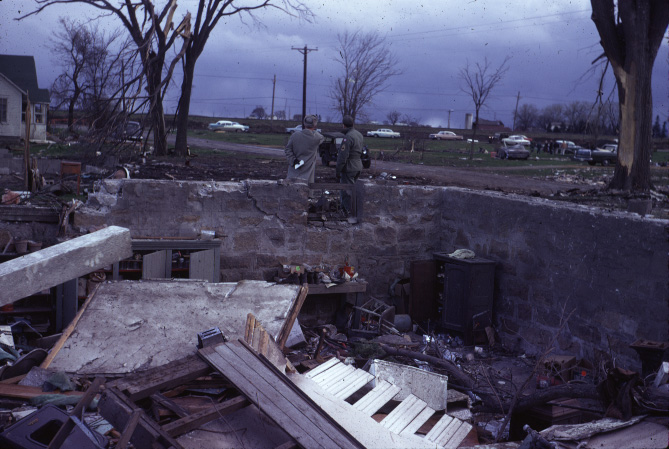
A leveled house from the 1967 tornado

On April 30, 1967, Waseca was severely damaged by the 1967 Iowa–Minnesota tornado outbreak.

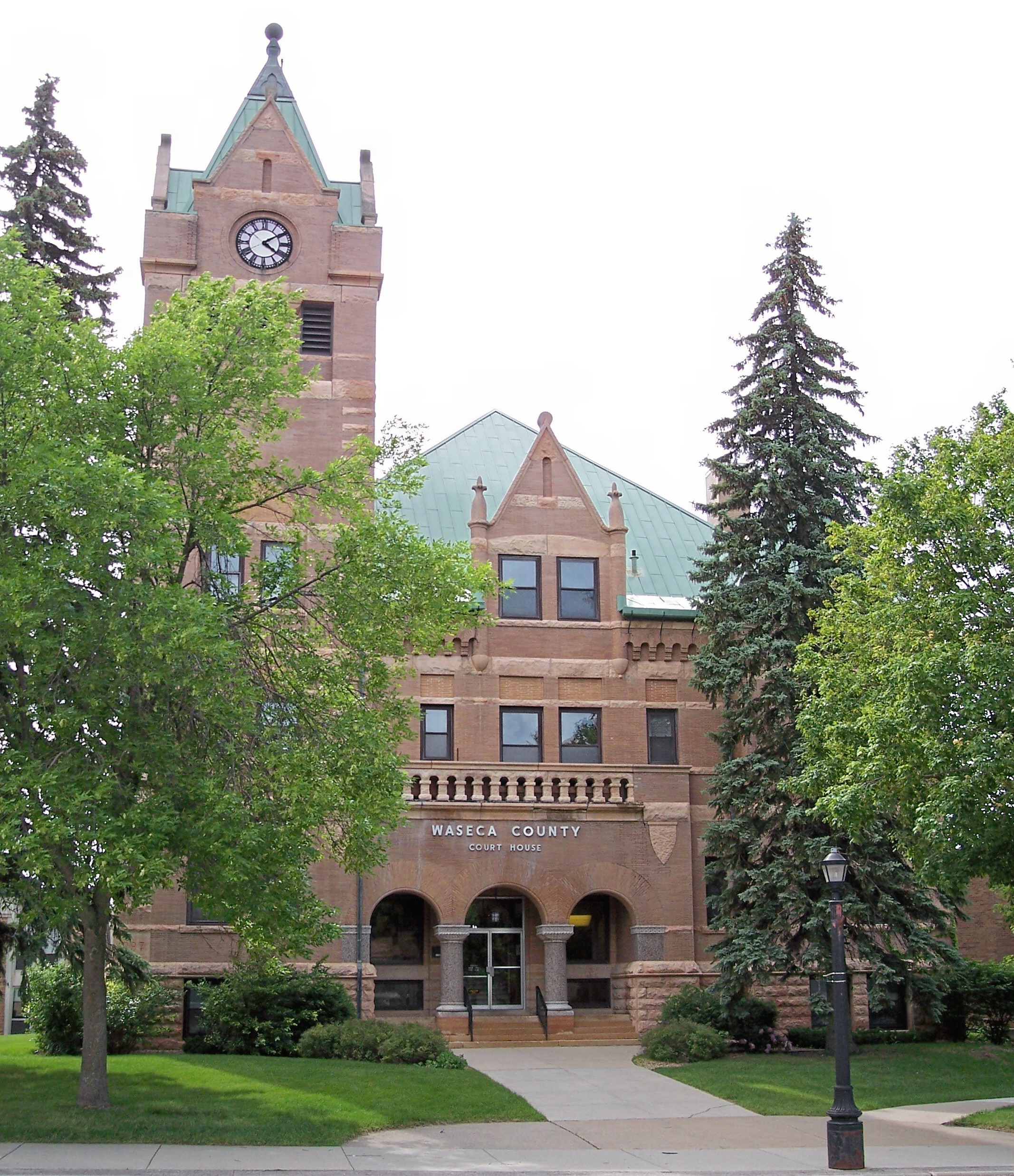
The Waseca County Courthouse in 2007

Waseca has six properties on the National Register of Historic Places: the 1868 Philo C. Bailey House, the circa-1895 William R. Wolf House, the 1896 Roscoe P. Ward House, the 1897 John W. Aughenbaugh House, the 1897 Waseca County Courthouse, and the circa-1900 W. J. Armstrong Company Wholesale Grocers Building.

Past mayors of Waseca include:

- William Grosvener Ward
- Robert Laird McCormick (1874–1880)
- Warren Smith (1881–1882)
- Marquis De Lafayette "M D L" Collester (1883-1883??)
- Gottfried Buchler (1886–1887)
- Eugene Belnap "E.B." Collester, (1887 to 1888)
- Towbridge
- D. S. Cummings (1888–1890)
- Col. D. E. Priest (1891-??)
- D. S. Cummings (1893–1896)
- John Moonan (1897–1898)
- Charles A. Smith (1898–1904)
- Bob Zehm
- Bob Sien
- Avery "Doc" Hall (1975-1987)
- Richard Marcus (1988–1989)
- Steve Manthe (1989–1982)
- Judy Kozan (1992–1993)
- Steve Manthe (1993–1995)
- John Clemons (1995–2000)
- Tom Hagen (2000–2004)
- Roy Srp (2004–2014)
- John Clemons (2014–2016)
- Roy Srp (2016–2022)
- Randy Zimmerman (2023-Current)

== Politics ==
- Waseca is in Minnesota's 1st congressional district. It is represented in the Minnesota State Senate by John Jasinski and in the Minnesota House by John Petersburg. The current mayor is Randy Zimmerman.

== Notable people ==
- Reverend E.H. Alden, made famous in Laura Ingalls Wilder's series Little House on the Prairie
- Joseph Alland, farmer and Minnesota state legislator
- D. E. Bowe, member of Wisconsin State Assembly
- Sarah Cahill (model), actress, model, 1995 Miss Minnesota Teen USA, Miss Minnesota USA 2003
- Gene Glynn, Minnesota's first ever Mr. Basketball, former Minnesota Twins third base coach
- George Herter, founder of Herter's outdoor goods business and author
- Dave Kunst, the first person to walk around the world (from 1970 to 1974); his journey began and ended in Waseca.
- John D. Lewer, farmer and Minnesota state legislator
- Sky Macklay, American composer and oboist
- George Peter Madden, lawyer and Minnesota state legislator
- Ray J. Madden, U. S. Representative
- Peter McGovern, member of Minnesota Senate
- Lewis L. McKune, politician, businessman, farmer, and military officer
- Glenn Odekirk, influential aerospace engineer for Hughes Aircraft Company
- Tim Penny, U.S. Representative
- Leroy Shield, composer, conductor, arranger of films featuring the Little Rascals and Laurel & Hardy, born in Waseca
- Jerry Terrell, professional baseball player for the Minnesota Twins and Kansas City Royals
