= Minneopa State Park =

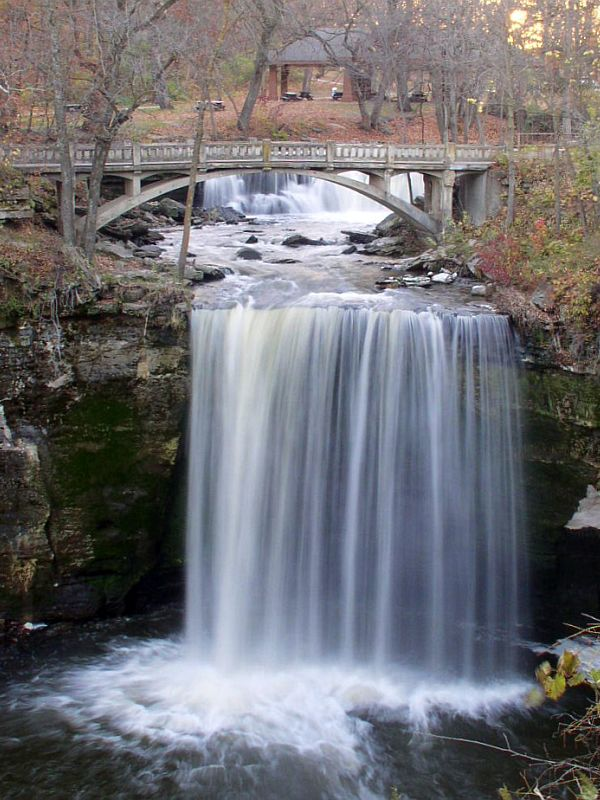
- Upper and Lower Minneopa Falls

- Location within Minnesota Location within the United States
- Location: Blue Earth, Minnesota, United States
- Coordinates: 44°9′44″N 94°6′8″W
- Area: 4,643 acres (18.79 km^{2})
- Elevation: 856 ft (261 m)
- Established: 1905
- Governing body: Minnesota Department of Natural Resources

- Minneopa State Park WPA/Rustic Style Historic Resources
- U.S. National Register of Historic Places
- U.S. Historic district
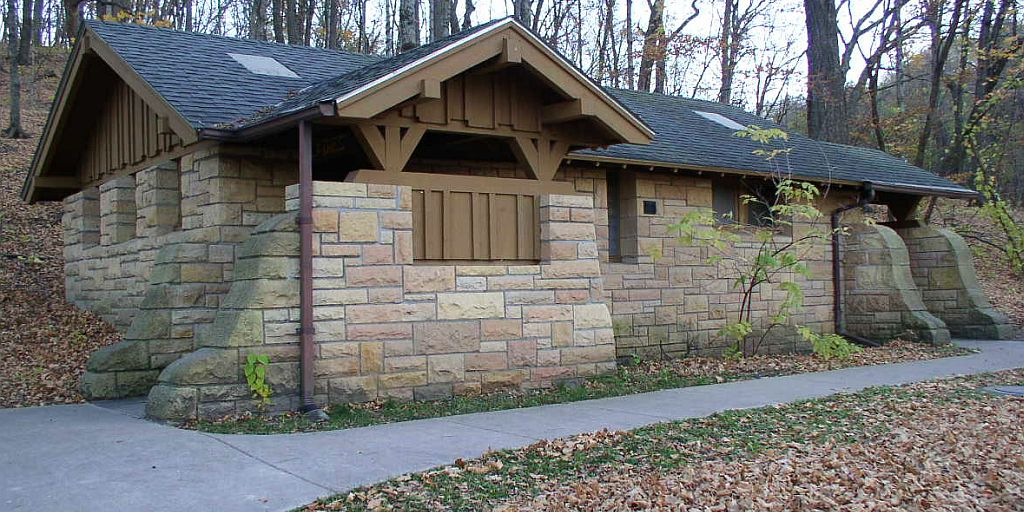
- A WPA/Rustic Style building in the park

- Location within Minnesota Location within the United States
- Location: South Bend Township, Blue Earth County, Minnesota
- Nearest city: Mankato, Minnesota
- Area: 58 acres (23 ha)
- Built: 1937–1940
- Architectural style: National Park Service rustic
- MPS: Minnesota State Park CCC/WPA/Rustic Style MPS
- NRHP reference No.: 89001663
- Added to NRHP: October 25, 1989

Minneopa State Park is a state park in the U.S. state of Minnesota. It was established in 1905 to preserve Minneopa Falls, a large waterfall for southern Minnesota, and was expanded in the 1960s to include the lower reaches of Minneopa Creek and a large tract of prairie. Minneopa is Minnesota's third oldest state park, after Itasca and Interstate. Two park resources are listed on the National Register of Historic Places: the 1862 Seppman Mill and a district of seven Rustic Style structures built by the Works Progress Administration in the late 1930s. The park is located almost entirely on the south side of the Minnesota River, three miles (4.8 km) west of Mankato. In 2015, the state reintroduced American bison to the park in a 330-acre (130 ha) fenced enclosure, through which visitors can drive in their vehicles.

== Geography ==
Minneopa State Park

Minneopa State Park is divided into two distinct sections by a corridor of roads, railroads, and private property. The original section contains the falls and Rustic Style structures. The much larger northern section, added in 1969, stretches along the Minnesota River and includes the campground and Seppmann Mill. The sections are contiguous with travel from one to the other by a county road.

Minneopa Creek drains a small watershed in Blue Earth County and a small part of eastern Brown County. Most of its 11 miles (18 km) flow through farmland before entering the park. 2.2 miles (3.5 km) upstream from its mouth, Minneopa Creek flows over two waterfalls. The creek cascades about six or seven feet (1.8 or 2.1 m) over the upper falls and flows 66 feet (20 m) before dropping over the 39-foot (12 m) lower falls. The name is a shortening of Minneinneopa, which is translated from the Dakota language as "water falling twice." Other translations have been given as "water of two falls" and "water of the dancing elk." Although Minneopa Falls is often referred to as the highest waterfall in southern Minnesota, Minnemishinona Falls in a nearby Nicollet County park is slightly higher at 42 feet (13 m), but is not as scenic or well-known. Lower Minneopa Falls can be called the region's largest, as it is 25 feet (7.6 m) wide, while Minnemishinona spans only 10 feet (3 m).

The region of the park has a continental climate of cold winters and hot summers. Temperatures are slightly milder along Minneopa Creek than in the prairie section due to the heavy woods.

== Natural history ==
=== Geology ===
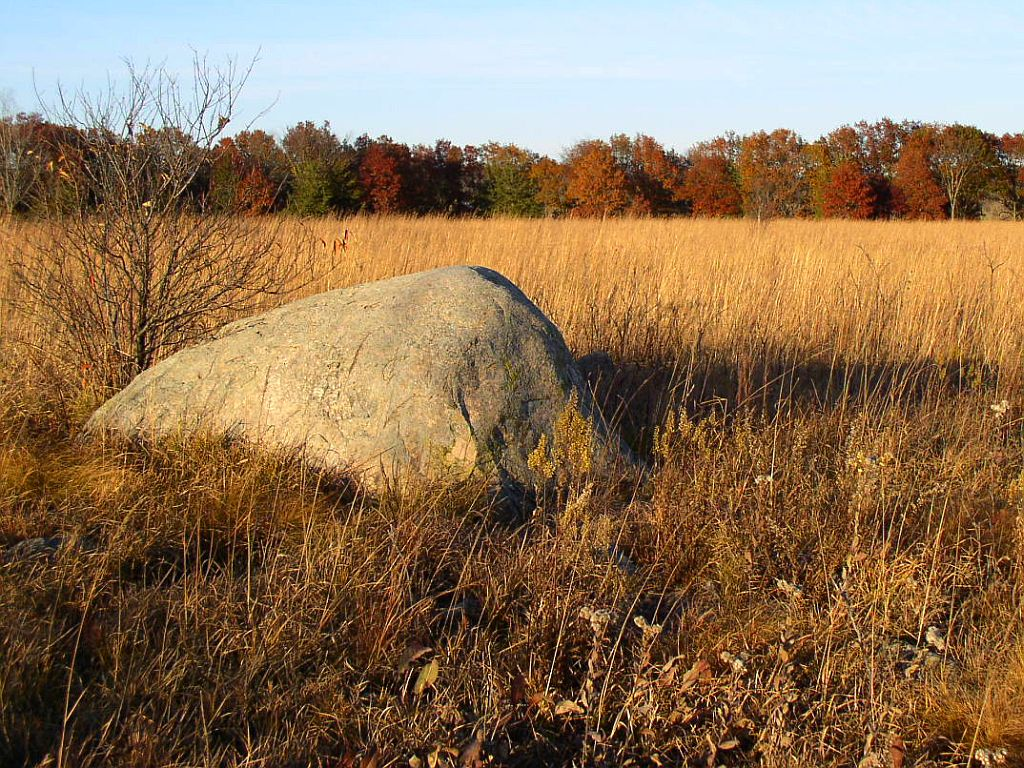
A glacial erratic in the park's prairie section

Minneopa State Park is underlain by flat layers of dolomite and sandstone. Evidence from well-drilling indicates that beneath these sedimentary rocks is a steeply tilted formation of granite that slopes down to the east deep under Mankato. Atop everything is a thick blanket of till deposited by glaciers.

At the end of the last glacial period, the continental glaciers were melting to the north. Glacial River Warren carried torrents of meltwater across Minnesota, eroding a wide valley. As the water level diminished in stages over time, fluvial terraces were left like steps on the sides of the valley. The glacial runoff ceased around 9,400 years ago, leaving a channel soon occupied by the vastly smaller Minnesota River.

The park's flat prairie area is a terrace of the ancient river. The Dakota name is Tinta inya ota, meaning "prairie with many rocks", because it is studded with numerous glacial erratics. These boulders were carried far from their northern sources by ice over 15,000 years ago. The soil is quite thin over limestone bedrock.

Tributaries flowing into the Minnesota River had to drop down into the deep glacial valley, creating numerous waterfalls. The waterfall on Minneopa Creek was likely once at the creek's mouth on the river. Over the millennia, downcutting of the creek has carved a gorge through the soft Jordan Sandstone, causing the waterfall to "migrate" upstream. The double waterfall in Minneopa is the result of there being three layers of differing hardness in the sandstone. The upper and lower layers are softer than the middle, which creates a short stretch of erosion-resistant creekbed between two waterfalls. The gorge is littered with blocks of the middle sandstone that broke off as the supporting layer below wore away. Weathering from the constant spray of the falls helps keep the gorge walls nearly vertical.

=== Flora ===
The pre-settlement vegetation was tallgrass prairie, broken by a swath of Big Woods flanking Minneopa Creek, with oak savanna at the east end, and bottomland hardwood forest along the Minnesota River floodplain. Today, these plant communities are largely intact, as much of the future park was unsuitable for agriculture, being too rocky, steep, or wet. The prairie is the most deteriorated, as much of it was intensively used as livestock pasture. Its 355 acres (144 ha) are dominated by junegrass, with a mix of other grasses, forbs, and small eastern red cedars. Larger red cedars ring the prairie. Southeast of the prairie are 204 acres (83 ha) of old fields exhibiting ecological succession. Their vegetation includes bluegrass, bromegrass, Russian thistle, alfalfa, and seedlings of eastern cottonwood and willow. Controlled burning is being used to improve the quality of the prairie. A 13-acre (5.3 ha) parcel is further along in its conversion from cultivation, with a very dense stand of young ash, basswood, elm, and boxelder.

The valley sides of both the river and the creek support a northern hardwood forest of 273 acres (110 ha) altogether. The key species are sugar maple, basswood, elm, and northern red oak, with some hackberry and ironwood. The basswoods and maples are becoming more dominant; Dutch elm disease claimed many elms, and the oaks are not replacing themselves as they mature and die due to their low shade tolerance. There is a stand of yellow birch at the extreme southwestern limit of this range.

The bottomland forest comprises 170 acres (69 ha) of cottonwood, silver maple, and elm. Saplings of those three species plus ash and basswood fill in the understory. The campground and nearby picnic area are within 49 acres (20 ha) of oak savanna. Mature bur oaks dominate, with scattered birch, elm, hawthorn, and red cedar. A further 49 acres (20 ha) of parkland are characterized as open woods, with just bur oaks and some elms. Just north of the falls parking lot is an old 2-acre (0.81 ha) orchard of black walnut. The spot was poorly chosen, and the trees are stunted for their age.

The park has very little in the way of wetlands. Near the river there is a 6-acre (2.4 ha) area of standing water with cattails, bulrushes, and arrowhead. 7 acres (2.8 ha) along the creek are classified as wet meadow, with reed canary grass, bluejoint, sedges, and cut-grass.

=== Fauna ===
A variety of wildlife is attracted to Minneopa State Park's diverse habitats. White-tailed deer are common, while coyotes are often heard if not seen. Beavers live along the Minnesota River. Two-hundred-thirteen species of birds have been recorded in the park. These include bald eagles, red-tailed hawks, eastern bluebirds, eastern and western meadowlarks, bobolinks, belted kingfishers, northern flickers, pileated woodpeckers, wild turkeys, and common pheasants. Few fish are found in upper Minneopa Creek due to warm water and agricultural pollutants, but the diverse habitats below the falls and closer to the Minnesota River support a variety of fish species.

Bison were reintroduced to the park in September 2015, as part of a joint project to increase the state's population of genetically pure bison that was previously confined to Blue Mounds State Park and the Minnesota Zoo. Minneopa was selected because it had an existing prairie, suitable existing infrastructure, a large potential audience of nearby residents, and nearby academic institutions that could benefit from research opportunities. Eleven females comprised the initial release, and the herd grew to 30 in 2019. The bulls are rotated out for genetic diversity. The maximum capacity of the site is about 40 individuals. They roam a 330-acre (130 ha) fenced enclosure. Visitors drive through the habitat on a road that has cattle guards at either end, or view the bison from locations outside the fence.

== Cultural history ==
=== Early history ===
The area of Minneopa State Park has been inhabited for thousands of years. Eight sites with stone artifacts have been recorded in the park, along with a group of burial mounds near the northwest corner of the property. The first Europeans in the area, led by Pierre-Charles Le Sueur, arrived in 1700 to mine a distinctive clay deposit from which the Blue Earth River gets its name, thinking it contained copper. From their base at Fort L'Huillier, they are thought to have journeyed the 0.5 miles (0.80 km) to the future park, visiting Minneopa Falls and hunting bison on the prairie beside the Minnesota River.

The Treaty of Traverse des Sioux opened up the region to white settlers, and a handful of individuals and families built homes along Minneopa Creek starting in 1853. The first of them, Isaac Lyons, used the creek to power a sawmill. The towns of South Bend and Mankato were founded a short distance to the east, on either side of the Blue Earth River. At this time, a band of Dakota led by Sintomniduta kept their village near the mouth of Minneopa Creek. They were known as "Six" for their habit of grouping tipis in multiples of six. In the fall of 1853 Sintomniduta's sister was accused by her husband of infidelity, possibly as a ruse to divorce her and marry a younger woman. She and the chief hid for a few days in a cave at the foot of lower Minneopa Falls, until his warriors returned from a hunt and were able to attack her husband's band. The sounds of this battle, and later a fight on June 9, 1860, between the Dakota and a party of Ojibwe warriors, terrified the settlers into thinking they were about to be attacked. However, the Dakota maintained good relations with the whites, and the children of both groups often played together. Sintomniduta's Cave, as it became known, collapsed around 1900.

=== Growing popularity ===
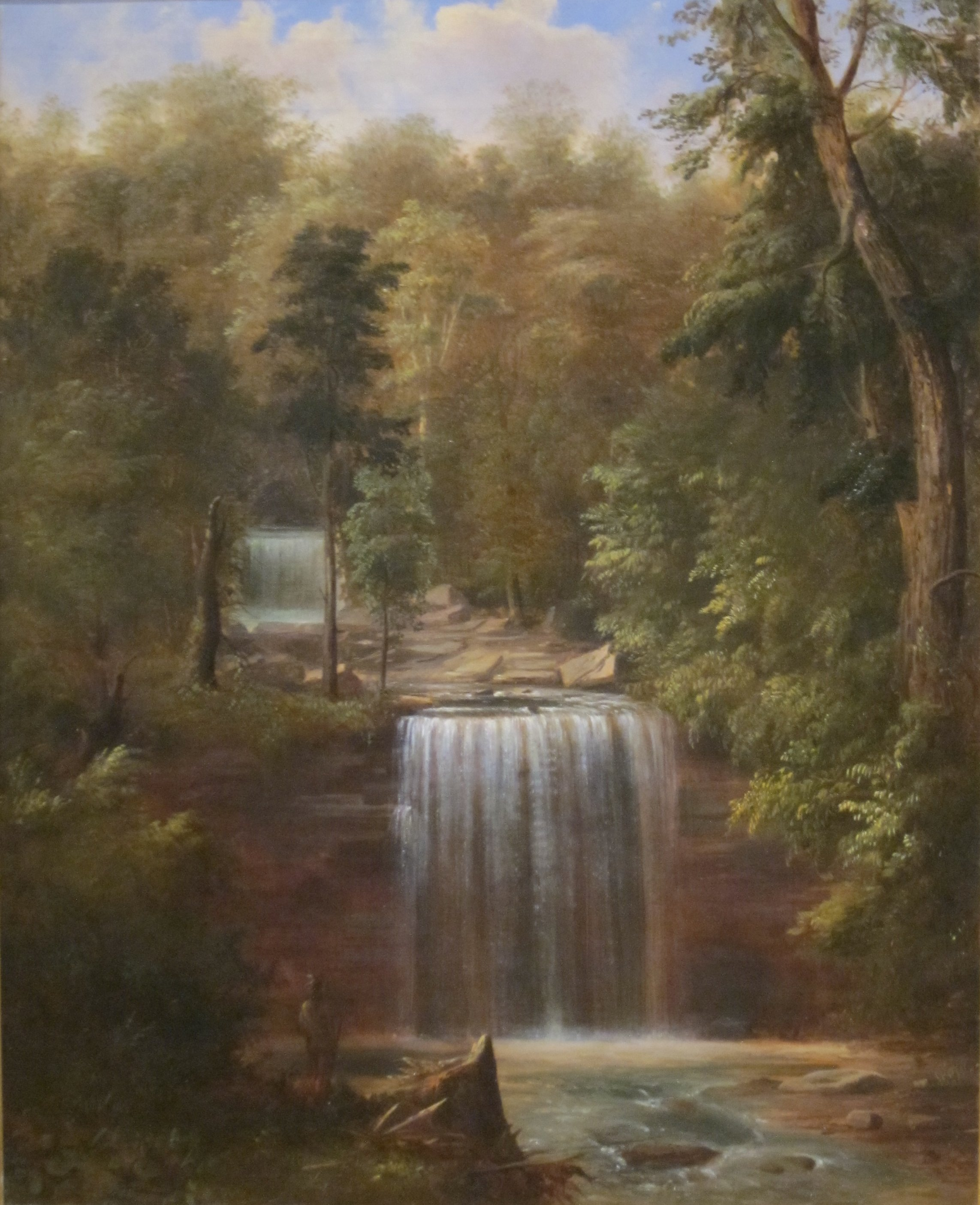
"Minneopa Falls, Minnesota" (1862) by Robert S. Duncanson

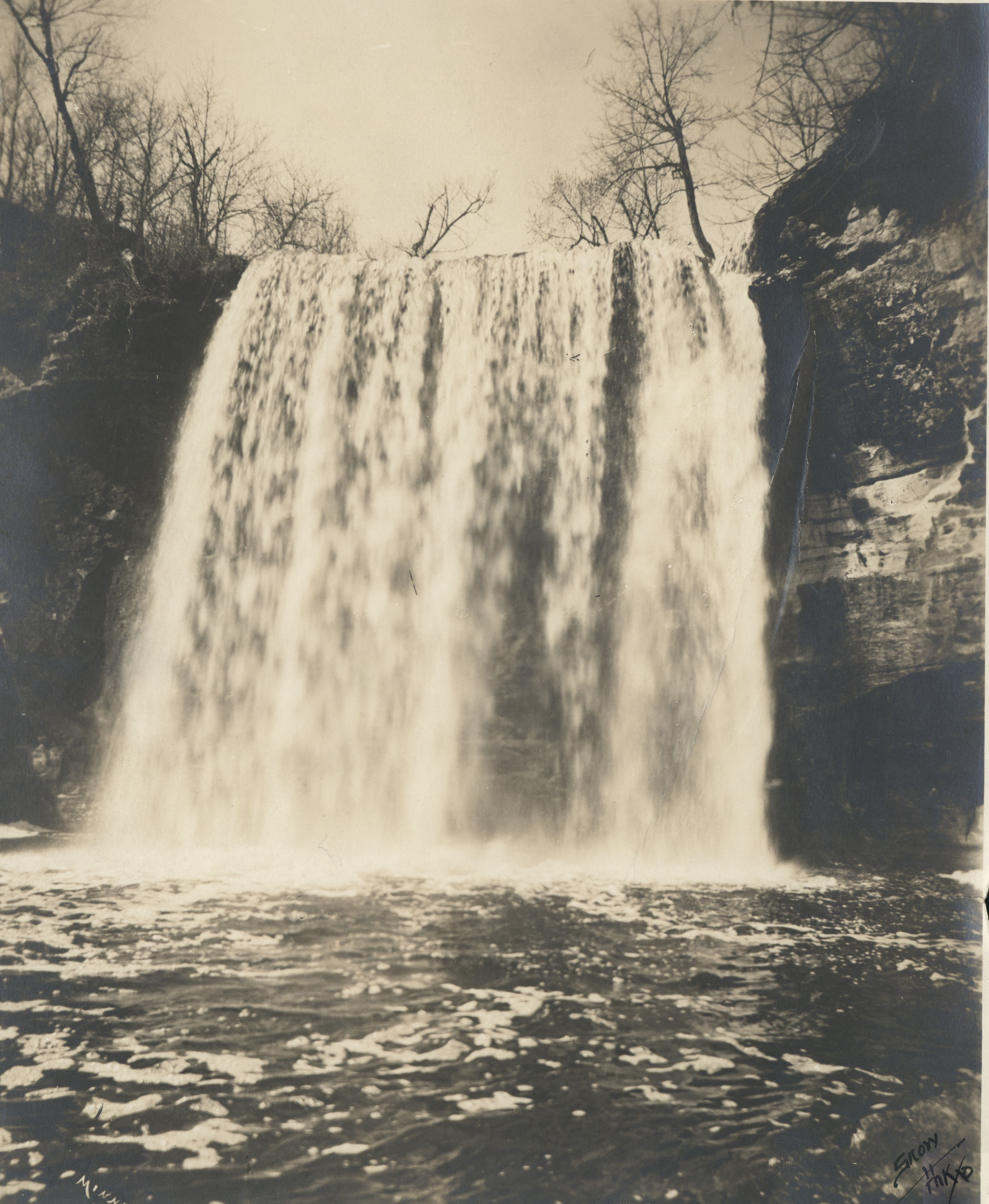
"Minneopa Falls, Mankato Minnesota" by John Snow

The scenic falls and their shady glen became a popular destination, especially on hot summer days. Depictions of the falls by artists and photographers spread their fame across southern Minnesota. The first business to cater to visitors was the Minneinneopa Park Hotel, opening in 1858 on well-landscaped grounds east of the falls. Pioneering black artist Robert S. Duncanson toured Minnesota in September 1862 and made sketches of Minneopa Falls, upon which he based a painting later that year. 1862 also saw local stonemason Louis Seppmann begin construction on his stone windmill, on a hill a mile to the northwest. However, the American Civil War and the Dakota War of 1862 greatly depressed travel for several years. The Minneinneopa Park Hotel closed in 1870 and served as a country home and then a dairy farm before burning down in 1906.

In the late 1860s, the St. Paul and Sioux City Railroad laid a track along Minneopa Creek. At this time, the property around the falls was owned by D.C. Evans, also owner of the biggest interest in South Bend. The railroad opted not to build a train station in South Bend due to its proximity to Mankato, so Evans convinced them to build a station at the falls. Evans built bridges and stairs into the gorge. The agent at the train depot, J.B. Hodge, made great efforts to promote Minneopa Falls. He convinced the railroad company to advertise the destination and to offer four trains daily from Mankato in summer at a discount rate. Group excursions as large as 5,000 people came from Minneapolis, St. Paul, and Winona, along with closer towns. Visitors arrived by horse, wagon, and paddle steamer as well as train.

Evans capitalized further on his falls property by platting the town of Minneopa in 1870. The town soon boasted a grain elevator, hotel, store, blacksmith shop, and a lumber business. However, a series of grasshopper plagues beginning in 1873 caused crops to fail for several years in a row, and the town was abandoned.

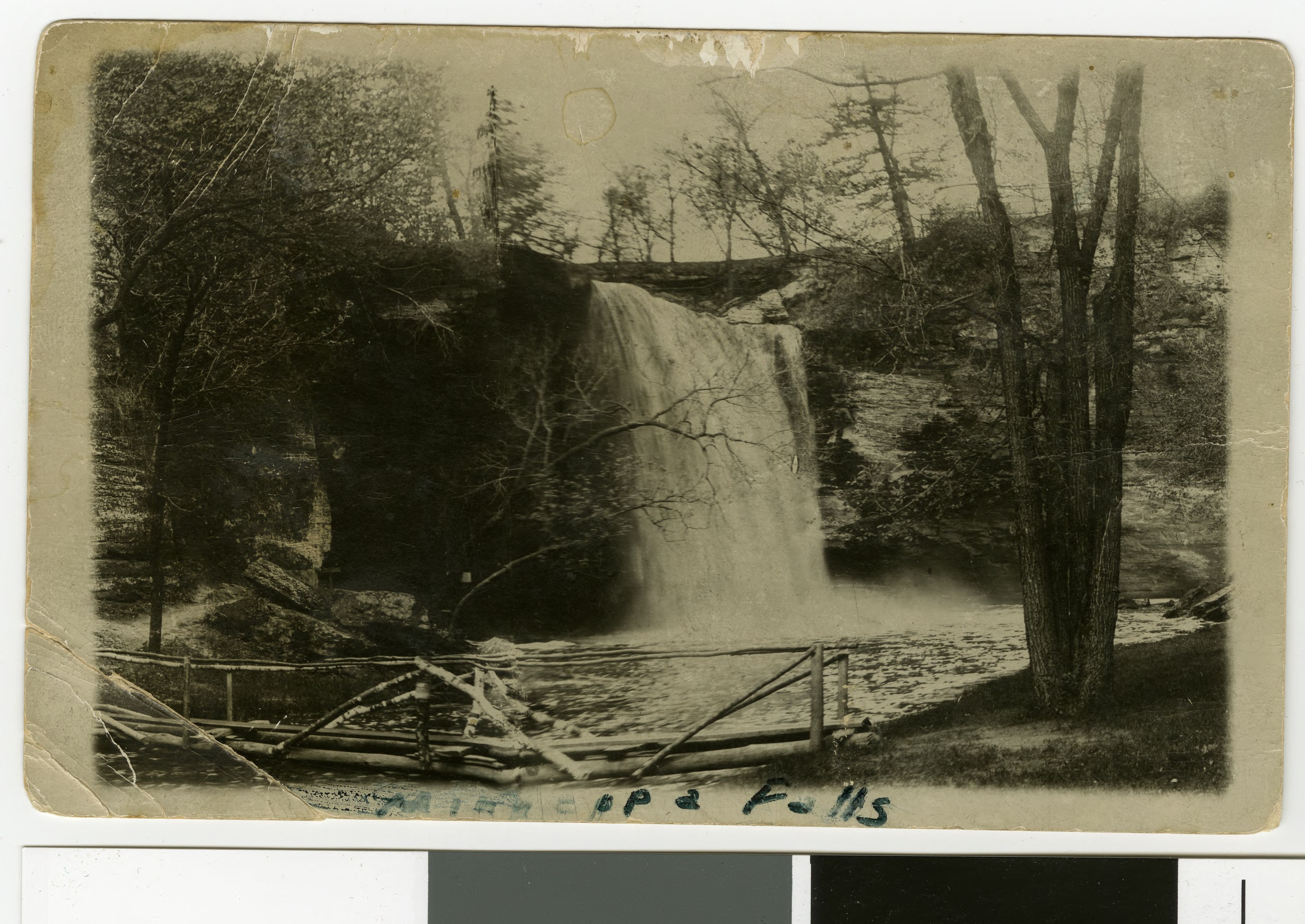
Wooden bridge below Minneopa Falls, Mankato, Minnesota

=== James-Younger Gang ===
The infamous James-Younger Gang hid out along Minneopa Creek following their disastrous September 7, 1876 bank robbery attempt in Northfield, Minnesota. After two weeks of rough travel while evading posses, the gang made camp under the railroad trestle over Minneopa Gorge. They hung up blankets as camouflage, but the hideout was spotted within a few days. Lawmen converged on the camp one morning, but made too much noise in their eagerness to capture the famous robbers. Alerted, the gang fled up the side of the ravine and over an adjacent hill. Bob and Jim Younger were still seriously injured from the Northfield raid, and the gang agreed to split up. That night Frank and Jesse James managed to flee on stolen horses as shots were fired at them. It was the final parting of the James-Younger Gang after ten years of banditry together. The rest of the gang circled back into the gorge and hid there for another three or four days before heading southwest. They were soon captured in a shootout near Madelia, Minnesota.

=== State park creation ===
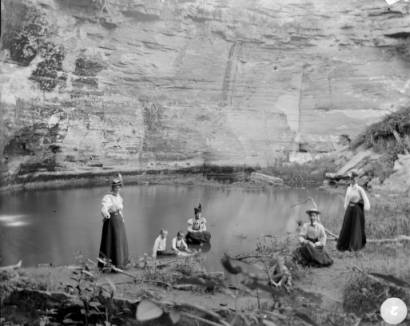
Visitors in Minneopa Gorge, 1898

Minneopa Falls passed through a succession of owners after D.C. Evans sold the property in 1885. While it continued to be a popular destination, each private development went out of business. By 1903, the latest owner was considering simply clearcutting the glen and pasturing cattle in it. Local citizens concerned about losing access organized to advocate a public park instead. A supportive state representative, Ezra Gates, introduced a bill to the 1905 Minnesota Legislature. Lobbying from Mankato residents helped ensure the passage of the Minneopa State Park bill, which included $5,000 to purchase and develop the land around the falls. By then, the property had yet another owner, who reluctantly sold just 25 acres (10 ha) to the state. Continued public support, though, induced the legislature to expand the boundaries and appropriate more funding the next year.

J.B. Hodge, the railroad depot agent who had championed tourism at the falls, became the park's first superintendent. With state funding he was able to improve safety and access to the gorge, replacing the wooden stairs with cement steps and installing a railing, netting, and picnic tables. Over the next decades, other developments included a bridge into the park, a refreshment stand, a large picnic shelter, and stabilization of the waterfalls. Locals continued to take a strong, almost proprietary interest in the park. In 1927, the head of the park's local advisory board planted an orchard of black walnut trees (thinking nut sales could be a future source of funding), and only informed the state after the fact in a letter.

=== State park development ===
Originally centered on the falls, Minneopa State Park gained a noncontiguous parcel in 1931, with the donation of the Seppman Mill by the builder's son. Development stagnated during the Great Depression, until federal funds provided Works Progress Administration crews. From 1937 to 1940, young men improved the falls area with new stairs, a public shelter, restrooms, maintenance buildings, and other structures, all built from local sandstone. A 58-acre (23 ha) district encompassing all seven of these enduring structures is on the National Register of Historic Places.

Minneopa State Park remained quite small, had no campground, and attracted primarily local use. By the 1960s, Minnesota was removing many such parks from its state park system and transferring them to city or county management. Minneopa faced a downgrade to a county park unless it could be expanded. Local groups once again rallied to its cause, and in 1967, the state legislature secured funds and a federal grant for expansion. The addition, purchased mostly from Seppmann heirs, included lower Minneopa Creek and 3 miles (4.8 km) of Minnesota River shore, and finally connected the Seppman Mill parcel with the rest of the park. The new land was soon developed with a campground, picnic area, and a road to the mill, and dedicated in 1972. A hiking and skiing trail system was blazed by volunteers by 1977.

== Recreation ==
Minneopa State Park has a campground with 61 sites, six of them with electrical hookups. There are also four group camps, each accommodating up to 15 people, and a camper cabin. There are three picnic areas and two picnic shelters.

The park has a 0.5-mile (0.80 km) hiking trail around the falls area. The northern section has 4 miles (6.4 km) of trail, which in the winter are groomed for cross-country skiing. There is no official trail along the Minnesota River because each attempt has been demolished by floods. A 2.5-mile (4.0 km) paved biking and walking trail connects Minneopa to Sibley Park in Mankato. It was completed in the fall of 2010 with a mix of federal, county, and state funds.

There are fishing opportunities along the river, especially for channel and flathead catfish. Minneopa Creek below the falls also supports game fish.
