= South Bend Township, Blue Earth County, Minnesota =

Township in Minnesota, United States

South Bend Township
- Township
- Location within the state of Minnesota
- Coordinates: 44°8′50″N 94°4′50″W
- Country: United States
- State: Minnesota
- County: Blue Earth

Area
  - Total: 16.9 sq mi (43.7 km^{2})
  - Land: 16.4 sq mi (42.5 km^{2})
  - Water: 0.42 sq mi (1.1 km^{2})
- Elevation: 958 ft (292 m)

Population (2010)
  - Total: 1,682
  - Density: 102/sq mi (39.5/km^{2})
- Time zone: UTC-6 (Central (CST))
  - Summer (DST): UTC-5 (CDT)
- FIPS code: 27-61240
- GNIS feature ID: 0665644
- Website: https://southbendtownship.wordpress.com/

South Bend Township is a township in Blue Earth County, Minnesota, United States. The population was 1,682 as of the 2010 census.

== History ==
South Bend Township was organized in 1858, and named from a meander in the Minnesota River.

== Geography ==
Public Land Survey System (PLSS) of the United States: Township 108 North, Range 27 West, Fifth Meridian, 23,092 Acres. According to the United States Census Bureau, the township has a total area of 16.9 square miles (43.7 km^{2}), of which 16.4 square miles (42.5 km^{2}) is land and 0.42 square miles (1.1 km^{2}), or 2.62%, is water. The Minnesota River forms the township's northern border, and one of its tributaries, the Blue Earth River, forms the eastern boundary. South Bend is bordered by Judson Township on the west side, Rapidan Township on the south side, and Mankato Township on the east side (separated by the Blue Earth River). In the late 1800s the portion of South Bend Township east of the Blue Earth River was designated as part of Mankato Township.

== Local government ==
South Bend Township has a governing Board of Supervisors. There are five Supervisors, elected at-large by the electorate of the township, each serving a three-year term. The Board appoints a Township Clerk who also serves as Township Treasurer. The township is the only township of the 23 Blue Earth County townships to support its own volunteer fire department. A portion of the township is served by township sanitary sewer and potable water.

The west half of the city of Skyline is within this township geographically but is a separate entity.

=== Unincorporated community ===
- LeHillier at 44.151910°N 94.035233°W

=== Major highways ===
- U.S. Highway 169
- Minnesota State Highway 60
- Minnesota State Highway 66
- Minnesota State Highway 68

=== Lake ===
- Rush Lake (eastern half)

=== Adjacent townships ===
- Belgrade Township, Nicollet County (north)
- Mankato Township (east)
- Rapidan Township (south)
- Garden City Township (southwest)
- Judson Township (west)
- Nicollet Township, Nicollet County (northwest)

=== Cemetery ===
The township contains Minneopa Cemetery.

== Demographics ==
As of the census of 2000, there were 1,491 people, 527 households, and 359 families residing in the township. The population density was 88.2 inhabitants per square mile (34.1/km^{2}). There were 559 housing units at an average density of 33.1 per square mile (12.8/km^{2}). The racial makeup of the township was 97.32% White, 0.13% African American, 0.27% Native American, 0.47% Asian, 1.14% from other races, and 0.67% from two or more races. Hispanic or Latino of any race were 2.62% of the population.

There were 527 households, out of which 31.9% had children under the age of 18 living with them, 55.6% were married couples living together, 8.2% had a female householder with no husband present, and 31.7% were non-families. 22.6% of all households were made up of individuals, and 6.1% had someone living alone who was 65 years of age or older. The average household size was 2.60 and the average family size was 3.04.

In the township the population was spread out, with 22.8% under the age of 18, 9.9% from 18 to 24, 26.4% from 25 to 44, 22.7% from 45 to 64, and 18.2% who were 65 years of age or older. The median age was 40 years. For every 100 females, there were 104.0 males. For every 100 females age 18 and over, there were 102.3 males.

The median income for a household in the township was $42,083, and the median income for a family was $46,719. Males had a median income of $33,889 versus $23,239 for females. The per capita income for the township was $18,038. About 5.5% of families and 7.2% of the population were below the poverty line, including 7.0% of those under age 18 and 4.1% of those age 65 or over.
