= Mankato Township, Blue Earth County, Minnesota =

Township in Minnesota, United States

Mankato Township
- Township
- Location within the state of Minnesota
- Coordinates: 44°8′45″N 93°57′28″W
- Country: United States
- State: Minnesota
- County: Blue Earth

Area
  - Total: 26.6 sq mi (68.8 km^{2})
  - Land: 25.9 sq mi (67.1 km^{2})
  - Water: 0.66 sq mi (1.7 km^{2})
- Elevation: 961 ft (293 m)

Population (2010)
  - Total: 1,969
  - Density: 76/sq mi (29.4/km^{2})
- Time zone: UTC-6 (Central (CST))
  - Summer (DST): UTC-5 (CDT)
- ZIP codes: 56001-56002
- Area code: 507
- FIPS code: 27-39896
- GNIS feature ID: 0664891
- Website: mankatotownship.org

Mankato Township is a township in Blue Earth County, Minnesota, United States. The population was 1,969 as of the 2010 census.

Mankato Township was organized in 1858.

== Geography ==
According to the United States Census Bureau, the township has an area of 26.6 square miles (68.8 km^{2}), of which 25.9 square miles (67.1 km^{2}) is land and 0.66 square miles (1.7 km^{2}), or 2.50%, is water.

The southeast three-quarters of the city of Mankato and the west half of the city of Eagle Lake are within the township geographically, as is as the entire city of Skyline. All are separate entities from the township.

=== Unincorporated communities ===
- Belle Haven at 44.165522°N 93.961343°W
- University Park of Mankato at 44.141633°N 93.986343°W

=== Major highways ===
- U.S. Highway 14
- Minnesota State Highway 22
- Minnesota State Highway 60

=== Lakes ===
- Eagle Lake

=== Adjacent townships ===
- Lime Township (north)
- Jamestown Township (northeast)
- Le Ray Township (east)
- McPherson Township (southeast)
- Decoria Township (south)
- Rapidan Township (southwest)
- South Bend Township (west)

=== Cemeteries ===
The township includes the following cemeteries: Bunker Hill, Calvary, Glenwood, Good Counsel, Grand View Memorial, Mankato, Old Masonic, Sibley Mound, Tivoli and Woodland Hills Memorial Park.

== Demographics ==
As of the census of 2000, the township has 1,833 people, 626 households, and 520 families. The population density was 63.4 inhabitants per square mile (24.5/km^{2}). There were 636 housing units at an average density of 22.0/sq mi (8.5/km^{2}). The township's racial makeup was 98.09% White, 0.38% African American, 0.11% Native American, 0.87% Asian, 0.16% from other races, and 0.38% from two or more races. Hispanic or Latino of any race were 0.38% of the population.

There were 626 households, of which 42.8% had children under the age of 18 living with them, 75.7% were married couples living together, 4.3% had a female householder with no husband present, and 16.8% were non-families. 13.1% of all households were made up of individuals, and 5.4% had someone living alone who was 65 years of age or older. The average household size was 2.92 and the average family size was 3.19.

29.9% of the township's population was under age 18, 6.8% was from age 18 to 24, 26.4% was from age 25 to 44, 28.3% was from age 45 to 64, and 8.7% was age 65 or older. The median age was 39 years. For every 100 females, there were 104.8 males. For every 100 females age 18 and over, there were 102.0 males.

The township's median household income was $64,471, and the median family income was $67,143. Males had a median income of $46,151 versus $28,571 for females. The township's per capita income was $27,189. About 2.0% of families and 3.7% of the population were below the poverty line, including 4.8% of those under age 18 and 5.5% of those age 65 or over.
