= Seppman Mill =

- Seppmann Mill
- U.S. National Register of Historic Places
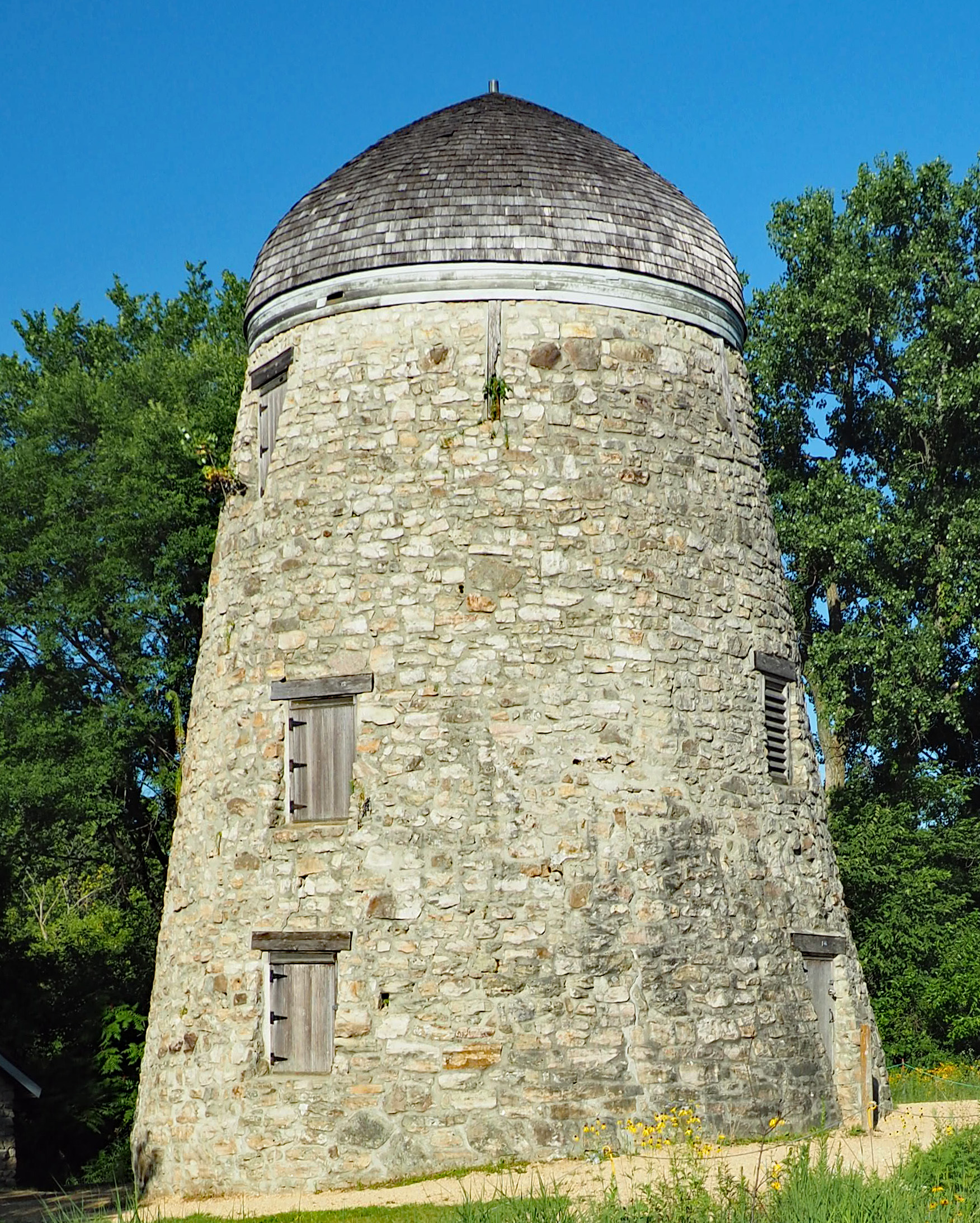
- The Seppmann Mill viewed from the northeast
- Location: MN 68 in Minneopa State Park
- Nearest city: Mankato, Minnesota
- Coordinates: 44°9′50″N 94°6′48″W
- Built: 1864
- Architect: Louis Seppmann
- MPS: Blue Earth County MRA (AD)
- NRHP reference No.: 71000435
- Added to NRHP: August 26, 1971

The Seppman Mill (sometimes spelled Seppmann Mill) is a former windmill in South Bend Township, Minnesota, United States, now preserved in Minneopa State Park. It was built by Louis Seppmann, a German immigrant, between 1862 and 1864 and is now on the National Register of Historic Places. The sails and internal machinery have been removed.

== Construction ==
Seppmann was born in Westphalia, Germany, in 1835 and emigrated to the United States at age 17. He settled in Blue Earth County, Minnesota, five years later, in 1857. He made his living as a stonemason. In 1862 he used his earnings to begin constructing a wind-powered gristmill on his own land. Seppmann was only somewhat familiar with windmills from his homeland, but drew on his "considerable natural talent for mechanics and invention."

Seppmann, with help from some fellow masons, built the first 10 feet (3.0 m) of the walls before being interrupted by financial difficulties and the outbreak of the Dakota War of 1862. He resumed work the next summer, joined now by neighbor Herman Hegley. Using a ramp and a wheelbarrow to convey material up the growing structure, they finished construction in 1864. Seppmann carved most of the wooden machinery himself with an axe, except for two metal cog wheels and the millstones, which had to be purchased from St. Louis for $600 (equivalent to $12,351 in 2025).

== Physical description ==
The stone walls are 32 feet (9.8 m) high and conical. At the base the diameter is 30 feet (9.1 m) and the walls are two feet (0.61 m) thick, but taper to 20 feet (6.1 m) across and six inches (15 cm) thick at the top. The mill is capped with a wooden dome that could be pivoted on a track to catch the prevailing winds. There was a small platform on the outside of the dome where the miller liked to sit and smoke his pipe. The wooden arms, covered with sailcloth, spanned 72 feet (22 m). The mill had five floors, though some were very short and only held machinery.

== Starting the mill ==
Seppmann was not a farmer, so to test the finished mill he had to borrow money and buy grain. As the American Civil War was still raging, grain was quite expensive and the bank charged him 25% interest in advance for his loan. Seppmann also needed to hire an expert to start up the mill and show him how to operate it. However, there was no wind for four or five weeks and the expert eventually gave up and went home. The first light wind didn't blow until a Sunday, but Seppmann was opposed to working on the Sabbath until his partner Hegley convinced him that if God had provided the first wind in over a month on a Sunday it must be okay.

However without the expert's help, Seppmann and Hegley immediately clogged the millstone. Thinking more speed would help, they put on full sail. Instead the rising wind set the arms spinning so fast the operators couldn't stop it. The wooden parts grew so hot that the windmill was in danger of catching fire. Meanwhile, a crowd of onlookers had gathered outside, eager to see Seppmann's curiosity finally in operation and surprised that it seemed to be running so fast it might tear itself apart. In desperation Seppmann tossed something into the gears, but it shattered and a piece was flung away with such force that it shot a hole through the rim of Seppmann's hat. At last Seppmann and Hegley were able to unfurl some of the sails and halt the mill. Ultimately they learned that the clog was due to poor dressing of the millstones and after making improvements, including a better brake, were operational by late September.

== Operation ==
In a good wind the mill could grind 150 bushels of wheat in a day, producing fairly good quality flour. Farmers came from as far 30 miles (48 km) away to have their grain milled. In 1866 Seppmann married and bought out his partner Hegley, giving shares instead to his new in-laws. The Seppmanns initially lived in a small stone house next to the windmill, which was converted to a warehouse in the 1870s after they moved to a new home.

Lightning struck the mill in June 1873 and blasted off two of the arms. Seppmann replaced them, but seven years later a tornado knocked off two arms again. By then technological advances and competition from other mills made it unprofitable to repair. Seppmann continued to operate the mill with the two surviving arms, making animal feed. Finally a storm in 1890 damaged the remaining arms and Seppmann ceased operations.

== Later history ==
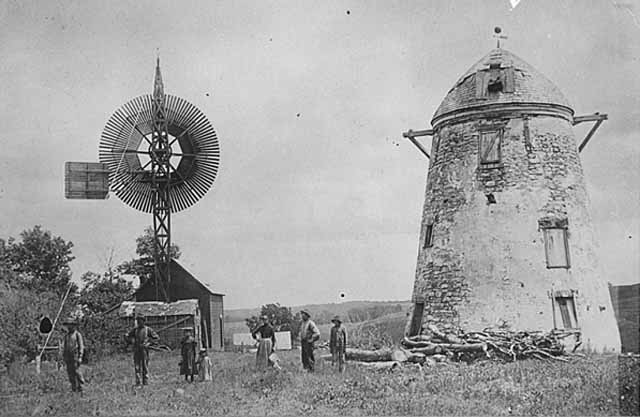
William Seppman, standing in front of Seppman Mill ca. 1890

Over the next 40 years the mill deteriorated and the warehouse was torn down entirely. In 1929 Louis Seppmann's son Alfred donated the windmill to be added to Minneopa State Park. The Blue Earth County Historical Society conducted repairs before the 1.24-acre (0.50 ha) parcel was transferred to the state in 1931.

The mill site was originally separated from the state park by over a mile and public access was difficult. The Minnesota State Highway Department built a parking area off Highway 68 in the mid-1950s. In the late 1960s Seppmann heirs and other landowners sold the intervening land to the state so the park could be expanded into one contiguous property. The Minnesota Department of Natural Resources spent $65,000 carrying out repairs to the mill and reconstructing the warehouse. The mill's exterior was repaired, interior structures refurbished, doors and windows replaced, and the roof reshingled.

The internal mechanisms have been dismantled, and neither the mill nor the warehouse interiors are open to the public. Park managers hope someday to restore the machinery and the arms.
