= Rapidan Dam =

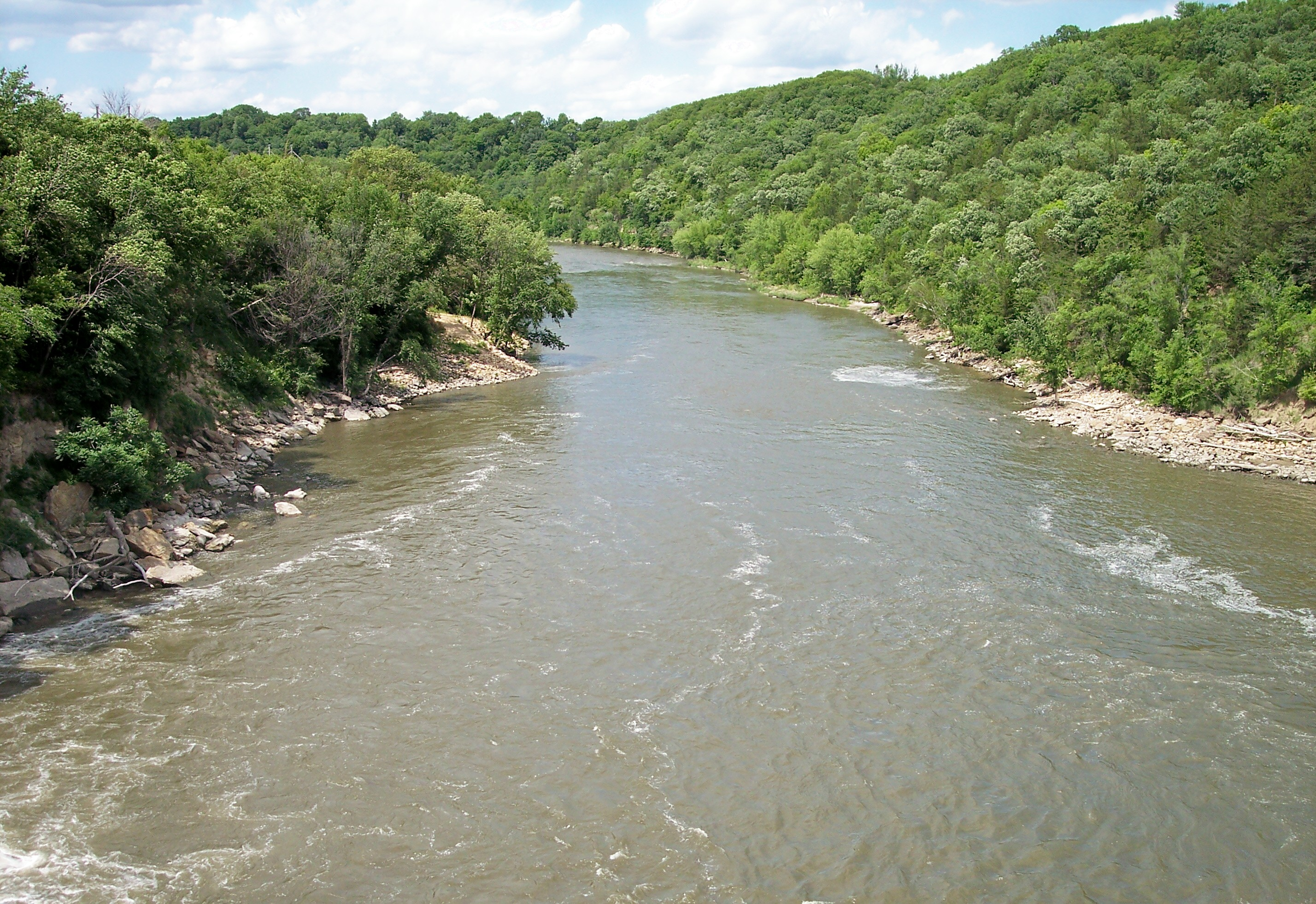
- Blue Earth River below Rapidan Dam

- Location within Minnesota
- Country: United States
- Location: Blue Earth County, Minnesota
- Coordinates: 44.093°N 94.109°W
- Purpose: Power
- Status: Partially failed
- Construction began: 1908; 118 years ago
- Opening date: 1910; 116 years ago
- Owner: Blue Earth County Government

Dam and spillways
- Type of dam: Concrete Gravity
- Impounds: Blue Earth River
- Height: 87 ft (27 m)
- Length: 475 ft (145 m)
- Spillways: 5 steel Tainter gates and 2 timber gates

Reservoir
- Creates: Rapidan Lake
- Catchment area: 2,430 mi^{2} (6,300 km^{2})
- Surface area: 318 acres (129 ha)

Power Station
- Turbines: 2
- Installed capacity: 6 MW (not currently operating)

The Rapidan Dam is a concrete gravity dam located on the Blue Earth River in Rapidan Township southwest of Mankato, Minnesota, in the United States. The dam was constructed from 1908 to 1910 to generate hydroelectric power. The dam and reservoir are owned by Blue Earth County, and the power plant and dam were operated by Eagle Creek Renewable Energy under an agreement with the county. Power was no longer generated at the dam due to damage from flooding in 2019 and 2020.

Blue Earth County operates the Rapidan Dam Park & Campground on the west embankment of the dam for camping, hiking, river access, and recreational activities. The Rapidan Dam Cafe and Store, which operated on the west bank of the river until 2024, was known for their homemade pies.

== History ==
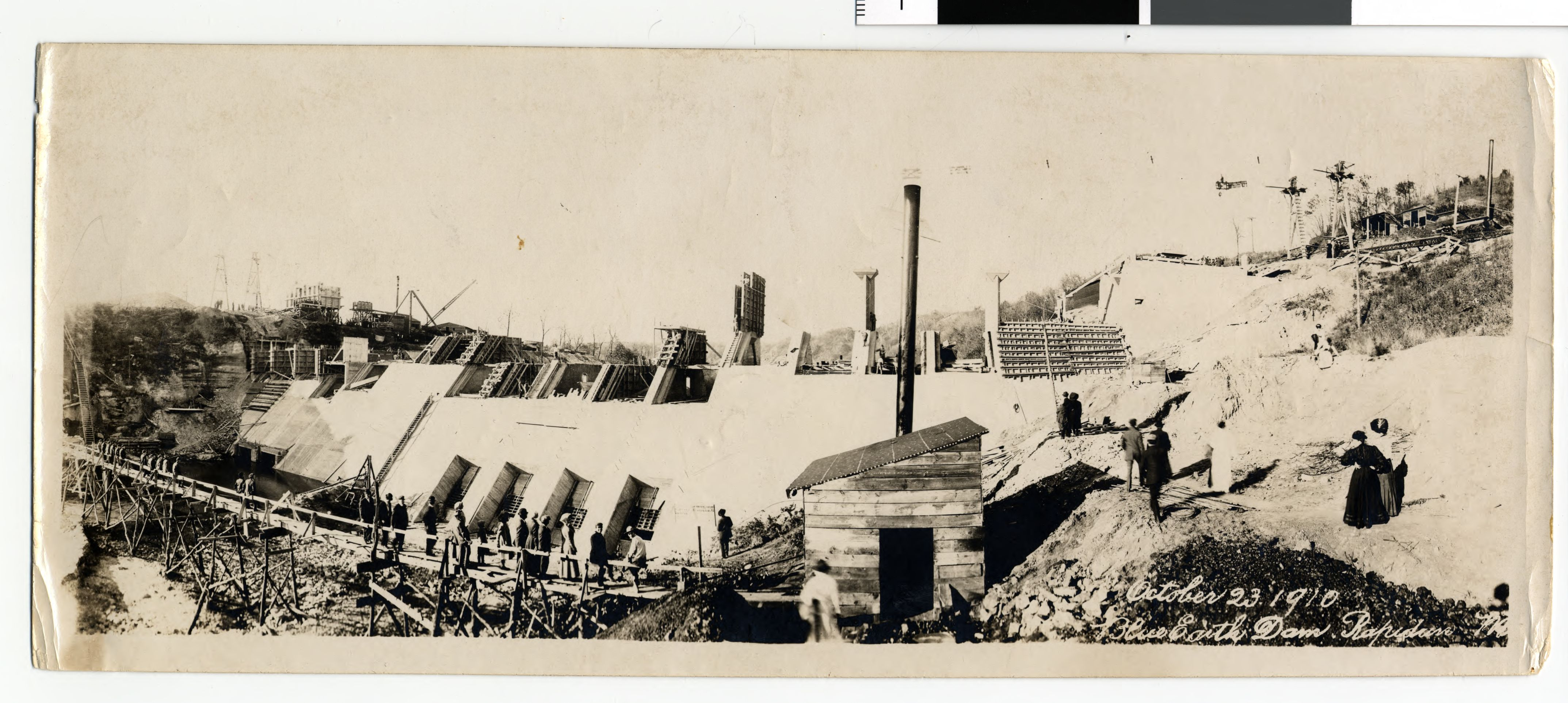
People viewing construction site of Blue Earth Dam, Rapidan Township, Minnesota

Rapidan Dam was constructed from 1908 to 1910 by Consumers Power Company (successor of Washington County Light & Power), which became Northern States Power Company in 1916. The equipment used to generate power was two 750kW pressure-cased Francis turbines with a 50kW exciter.

The hydroelectric equipment at the dam generated power from 1911 to 1965 for Northern States Power with an average annual production of 7.3 gigawatt-hours.

=== 1965 gate failure ===
In 1965, a record-breaking 500-year flood damaged the dam. The flood brought high water levels and heavy ice downstream to the dam, and "ripped out" 6 of the 7 tainter gates. This was mostly caused by the tainter gates being positioned so that the bottom edges of the gates were submerged during a high-water condition. The failure of the gates caused the water level in the reservoir to drop 9 feet (2.7 m) and exposed 400 acres (160 ha) of mud flats.

In 1970 (or 1969), the dam was acquired by Blue Earth County, which has operated the facility since then.

Two years later in 1972, Blue Earth County ruled that the dam should be rebuilt or torn down due to concerns over the impact of a collapse.

=== 1983 retrofit ===
In 1983, the county awarded a contract to the Johnson Bros. construction company to restore the dam so that it could generate power. Work started in May 1983. The original corbels on the dam were not reinforced, so they did not meet 1980s standards. There was concern that they were vulnerable to shearing. During the retrofit, 193 anchors were installed to strengthen the corbels. New tainter gates were designed and installed to replace those damaged in 1965. The new gate design was stronger than the original to prevent it from failing due to pressure from water and ice again. In July 1982, a specification was issued for pumping equipment, and bids were received in October of that year. Allis-Chalmers gated tubular turbines were chosen. These were rated for a generator output of 2.5 megawatts of power each. Concerns were raised that a vortex could form due to the design of the new intake. The design was modelled at Saint Anthony Falls Hydraulic Laboratory and shown to cause a vortex. The design was already under construction by this point, so a change was made to add a guidewall, round the noses of the piers, and add a plate with holes behind the trashracks. Work also involved the repair and maintenance of trashracks, stairs, doors, and a roof. Part of the retrofit involved financial computer modelling of the dam's operation using 40 years of historical data.

In 2002, it was discovered that the foundation of the dam needed emergency repairs, which were carried out to stop the dam failing. This included filling concrete in a void between several buttresses and part of the base slab at the toe of the spillway. This cost $1,034,000.

In 2019, the dam was damaged by flooding and stopped producing electricity. In 2021, the county commissioned two studies from Barr Engineering Co. to explore the options for the dam's state of disrepair. Two options were studied: dam repair or dam removal. From April to June 2022, the county collected community feedback regarding these options. 69% of responses supported repairing the dam and 18% supported removal. As of April 2023 the National Inventory of Dams rated the dam in poor condition and its hazard potential as "significant".

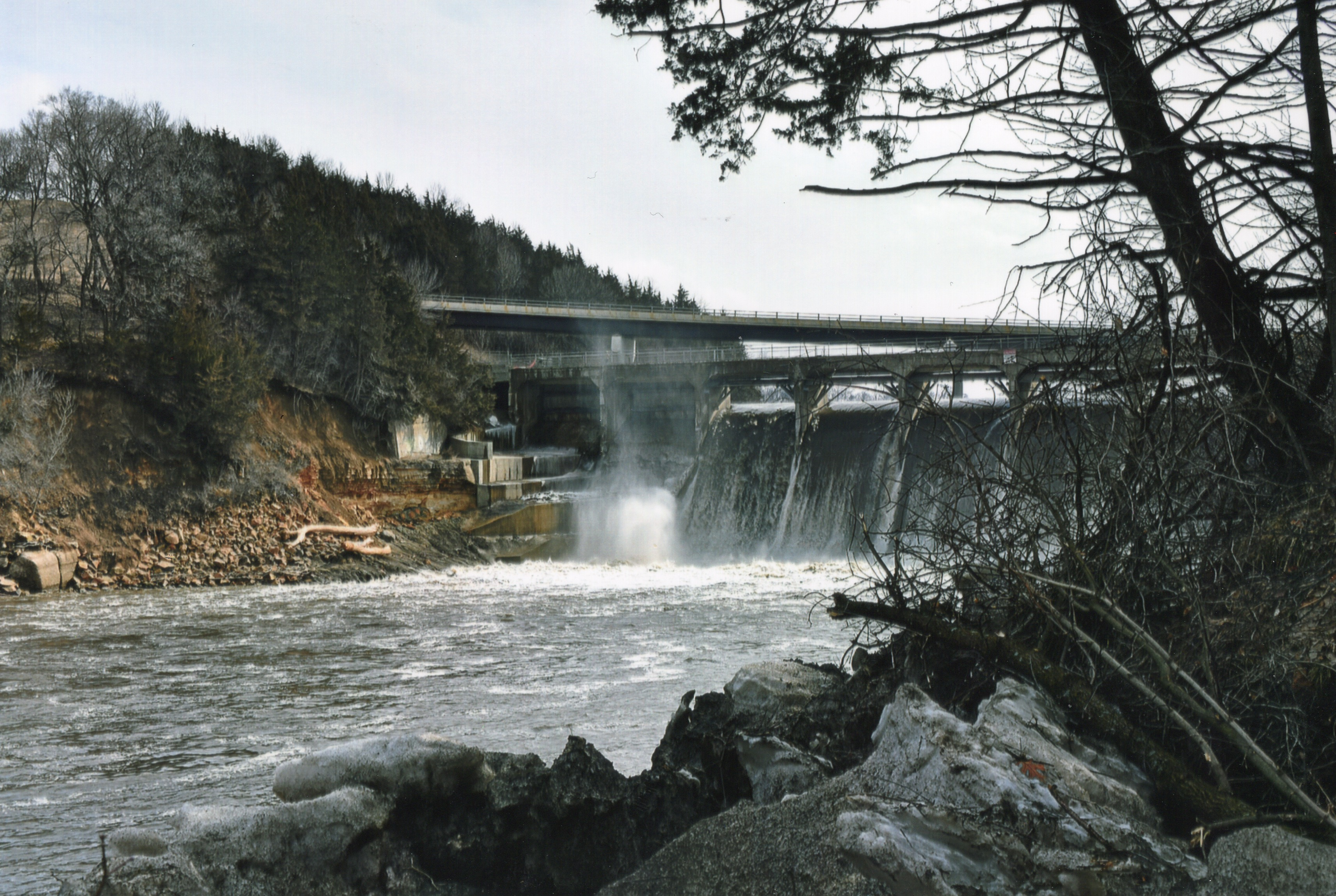
Rapidan Dam photographed in March 2020, Rapidan Township, Minnesota

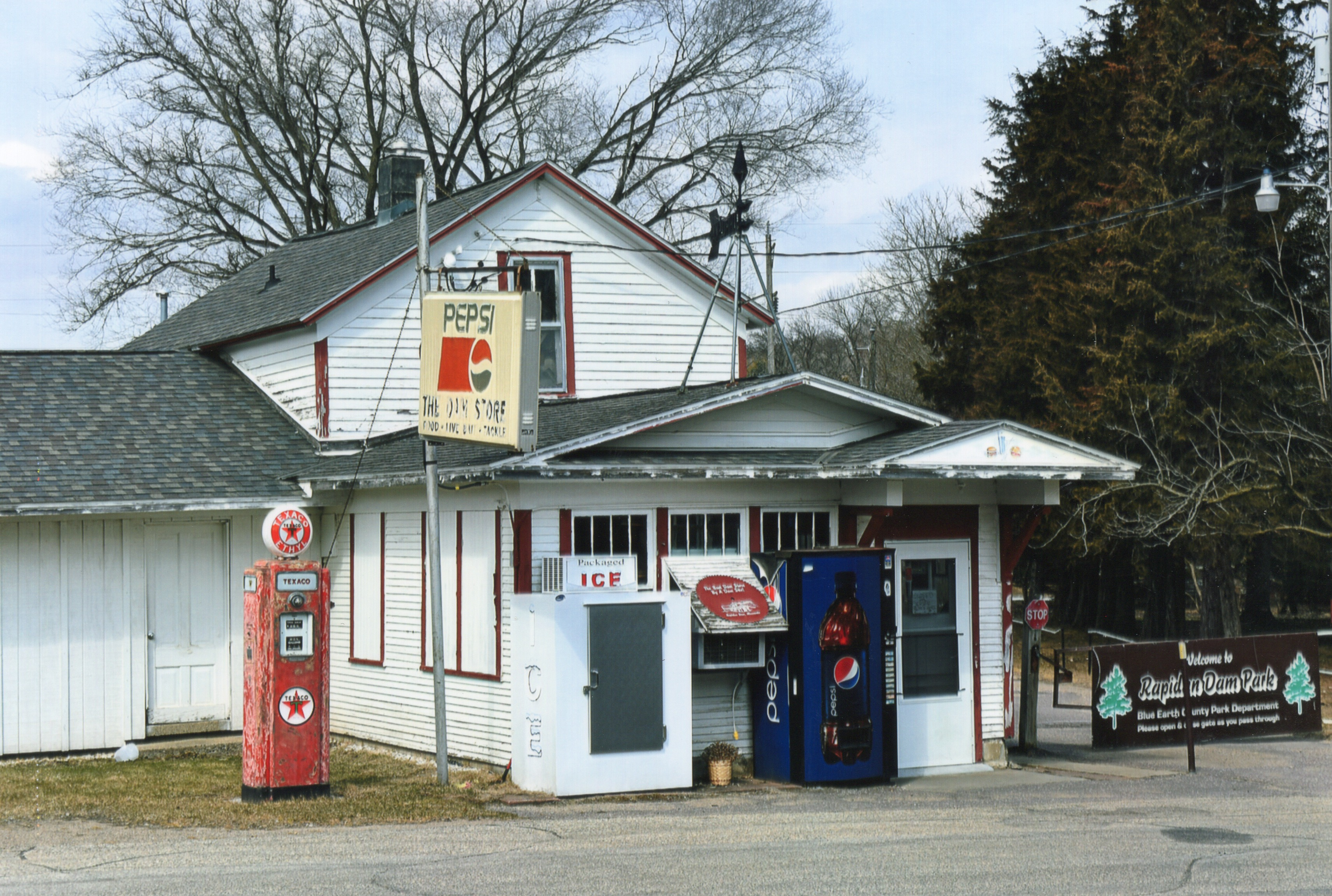
The Dam Store at Rapidan Dam. Photographed in March 2020

=== 2024 storm damage ===
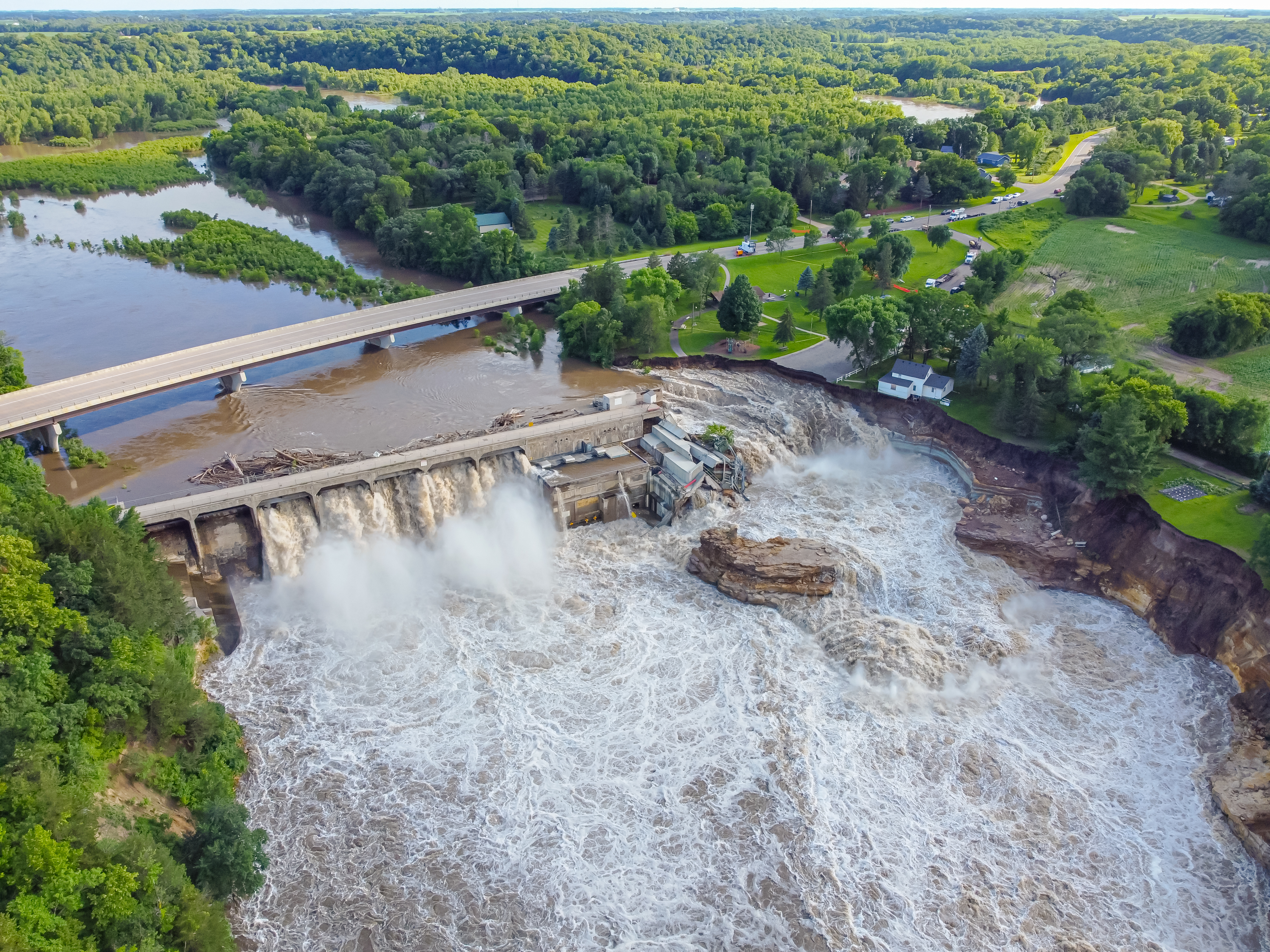
The dam on June 25, 2024, showing the Dam Store at the edge of the precipice before its collapse

Following flooding on the river due to heavy rain, on June 24, 2024, debris on the river gathered behind the dam and caused the river to back up. The dam was declared to be in an "imminent failure condition". Dam operators first alerted authorities at around 10:36 a.m. CDT. A flash-flood warning was enacted and residents were urged to evacuate. Officials had said this is a low-risk dam if there was a catastrophic failure. They indicated that the campground would need to be evacuated, and then the only risk would be to people located on the river itself. The largest damage was predicted to be environmental, as a large amount of sediment had built up in the reservoir, and much of it would eventually wash down river.

The river suffered a side breach due to high water flows and washed away two Xcel Energy substations (one connecting the dam to the system and the other providing power to around 600 customers); it also destroyed a shed and a home. On June 25, 2024, at around 9:30 p.m., the home of the Rapidan Dam Store owners collapsed into the water. On June 28, 2024, Blue Earth County bought the Rapidan Dam store, and demolished it. The store has temporarily re-opened in Mankato. With the continuing erosion, and the release of sediment resulting from the collapse, officials were monitoring the County Highway 9 bridge that spanned the river just upstream from the dam, particularly one pier whose pilings were exposed by the high water flows and shifting sediment.

The Blue Earth County Board of Commissioners voted to remove the dam and replace the bridge. On February 5, 2025, the County 9 bridge was exploded by crews.

== See also ==
- List of dams and reservoirs in Minnesota
- Hydroelectric power in the United States

== Sources ==
- a 2019 article by The Free Press of Mankato, about the options being considered for repair or removal, as well as events in the dam's history
