= Good Thunder, Minnesota =

City in Minnesota, United States

- City
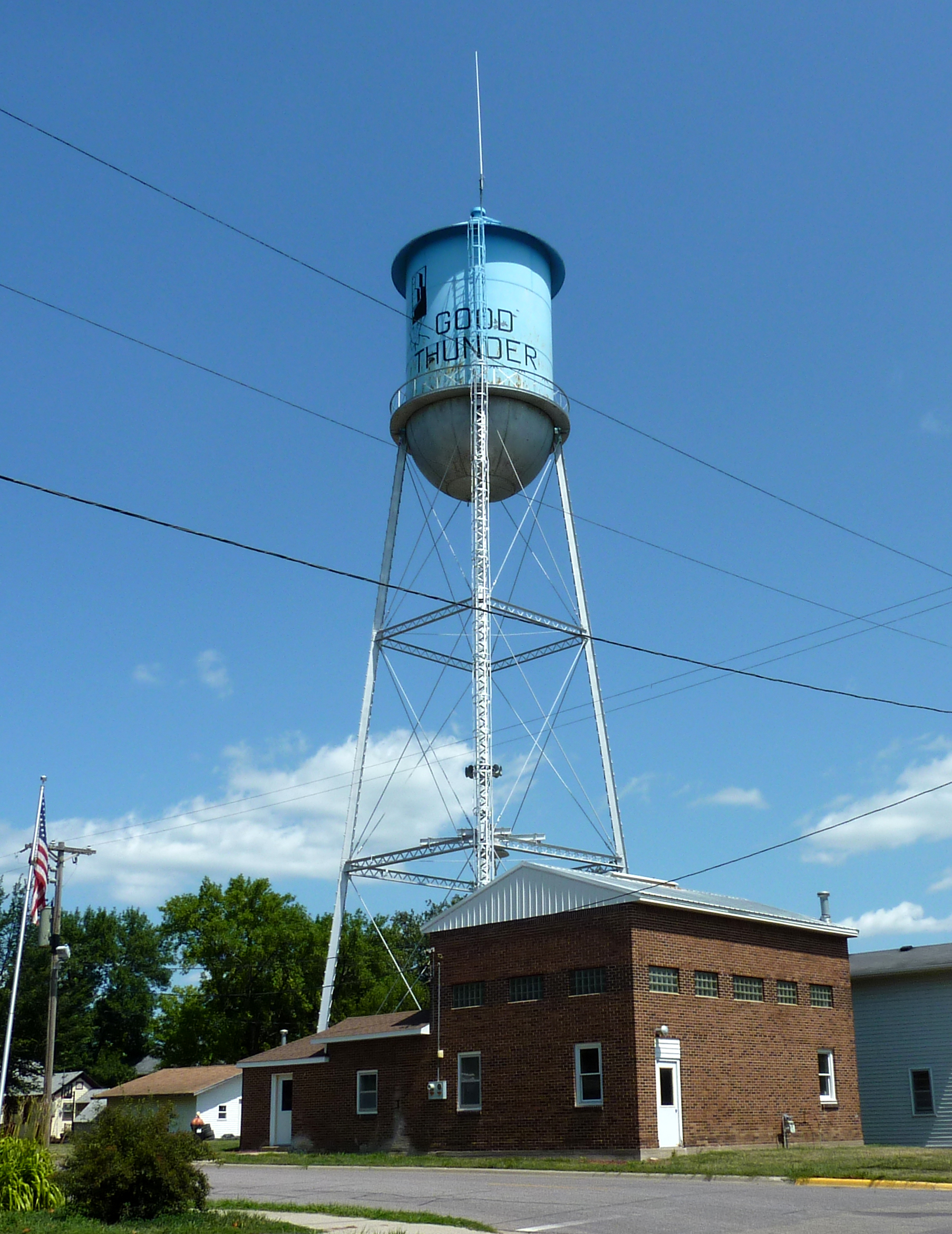
- Water tower

- Location of Good Thunder, Minnesota
- Coordinates: 44°00′24″N 94°04′13″W
- Country: United States
- State: Minnesota
- County: Blue Earth
- Platted: April 1871
- Incorporated: March 2, 1893

Government
  - Type: Mayor – Council
  - Mayor: Robert Anderson

Area
  - Total: 0.63 sq mi (1.62 km^{2})
  - Land: 0.63 sq mi (1.62 km^{2})
  - Water: 0 sq mi (0.00 km^{2})
- Elevation: 1,004 ft (306 m)

Population (2020)
  - Total: 560
  - Estimate (2022): 566
  - Density: 893.5/sq mi (344.99/km^{2})
- Time zone: UTC−6 (Central (CST))
  - Summer (DST): UTC−5 (CDT)
- ZIP Code: 56037
- Area code: 507
- FIPS code: 27-24506
- GNIS feature ID: 2394927
- Sales tax: 7.375%
- Website: goodthundermn.gov

Good Thunder is a city in Blue Earth County, Minnesota, United States, situated along the Maple River. The population was 560 at the 2020 census.

== History ==
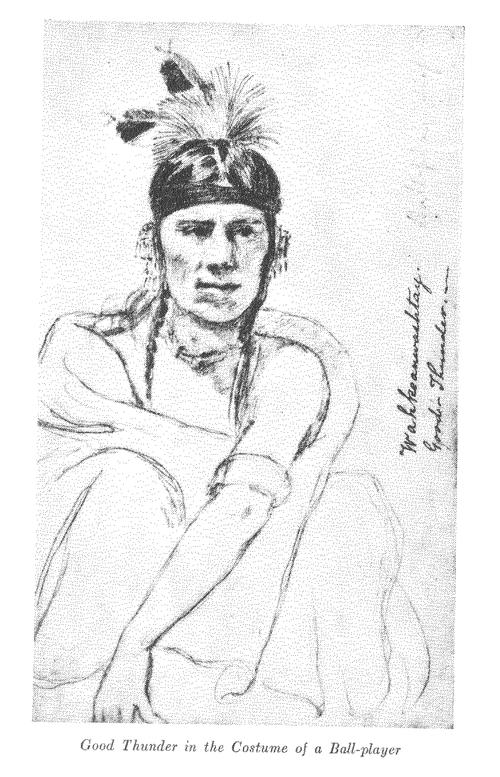
Good Thunder, after whom the town is named

Originally, this area was a part of the Winnebago Reservation from 1855 to 1859. John Graham established a hotel in what is now the town in 1870. When the railroad arrived in Minnesota, the town began as an agricultural commerce center.

Good Thunder was platted in April 1871, and named for a Winnebago chief (who was also known as Wakuntchapinka). Chief Good Thunder was well known to the early white towns people, and he had converted to Christianity.

The town was incorporated on March 2, 1893.

== Geography ==
According to the United States Census Bureau, the city has a total area of 0.64 square miles (1.66 km^{2}), all land.

Former State Highway 66; and County Roads 1 and 10 are three of the main routes in the community.

== Demographics ==
Historical population
Census	Pop.	Note	%±
1880	149		—
1900	505		—
1910	419		−17.0%
1920	464		10.7%
1930	452		−2.6%
1940	457		1.1%
1950	476		4.2%
1960	468		−1.7%
1970	489		4.5%
1980	560		14.5%
1990	561		0.2%
2000	592		5.5%
2010	583		−1.5%
2020	560		−3.9%
2022 (est.)	566		1.1%
U.S. Decennial Census; 2020 Census

Good Thunder is part of the Mankato–North Mankato Metropolitan Statistical Area.

=== 2010 census ===
Someone living alone who was 65 years of age or older. The average household size was 2.73 and the average family size was 3.21.

As of the census of 2010, there were 583 people, 227 households, and 155 families living in the city. The population density was 910.9 inhabitants per square mile (351.7/km^{2}). There were 242 housing units at an average density of 378.1 per square mile (146.0/km^{2}). The racial makeup of the city was 98.1% White, 1.4% African American, 0.2% Native American, and 0.3% from two or more races. Hispanic or Latino of any race were 1.0% of the population.

There were 227 households, of which 36.1% had children under the age of 18 living with them, 53.7% were married couples living together, 8.8% had a female householder with no husband present, 5.7% had a male householder with no wife present, and 31.7% were non-families. 24.2% of all households were made up of individuals, and 7.9% had someone living alone who was 65 years of age or older. The average household size was 2.57 and the average family size was 3.09.

The median age in the city was 34 years. 27.4% of residents were under the age of 18; 7.8% were between the ages of 18 and 24; 29.7% were from 25 to 44; 24% were from 45 to 64; and 10.8% were 65 years of age or older. The gender makeup of the city was 49.4% male and 50.6% female.

=== 2000 census ===
As of the census of 2000, there were 592 people, 217 households, and 161 families living in the city. The population density was 945.7 inhabitants per square mile (365.1/km^{2}). There were 233 housing units at an average density of 372.2 per square mile (143.7/km^{2}). The racial makeup of the city was 97.64% White, 0.17% African American, 0.17% Native American, 0.34% Asian, and 1.69% from two or more races.

There were 217 households, out of which 43.8% had children under the age of 18 living with them, 63.6% were married couples living together, 8.3% had a female householder with no husband present, and 25.8% were non-families. 24.0% of all households were made up of individuals, and 12.0% had In the city, the population was spread out, with 32.8% under the age of 18, 8.8% from 18 to 24, 31.3% from 25 to 44, 16.4% from 45 to 64, and 10.8% who were 65 years of age or older. The median age was 31 years. For every 100 females, there were 94.1 males. For every 100 females age 18 and over, there were 90.4 males.

The median income for a household in the city was $42,500, and the median income for a family was $45,469. Males had a median income of $31,375 versus $21,146 for females. The per capita income for the city was $14,524. About 12.4% of families and 13.0% of the population were below the poverty line, including 16.7% of those under age 18 and 19.3% of those age 65 or over.

== Gallery ==
Good Thunder, Minnesota

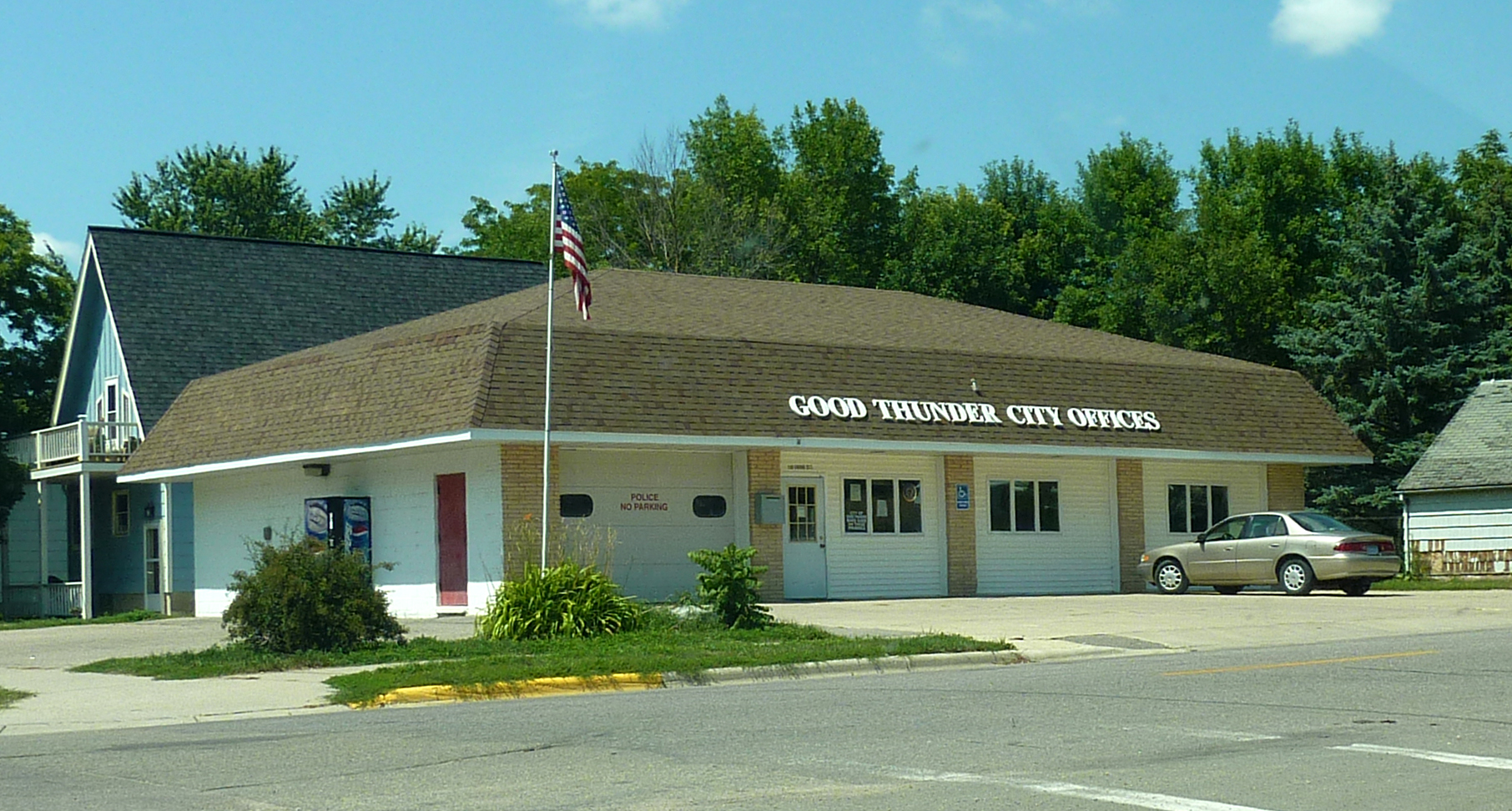
Good Thunder City Offices

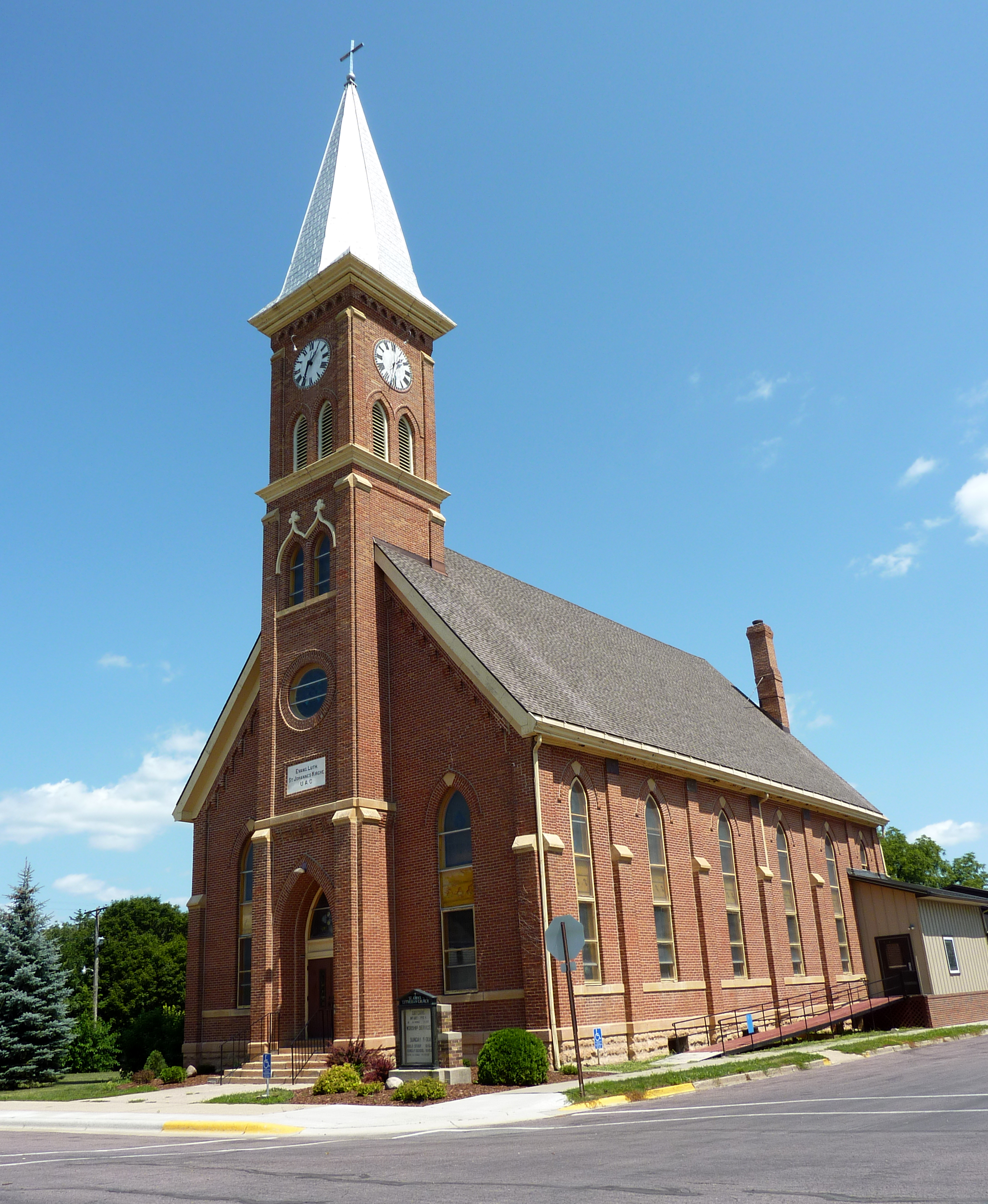
St. John Lutheran Church

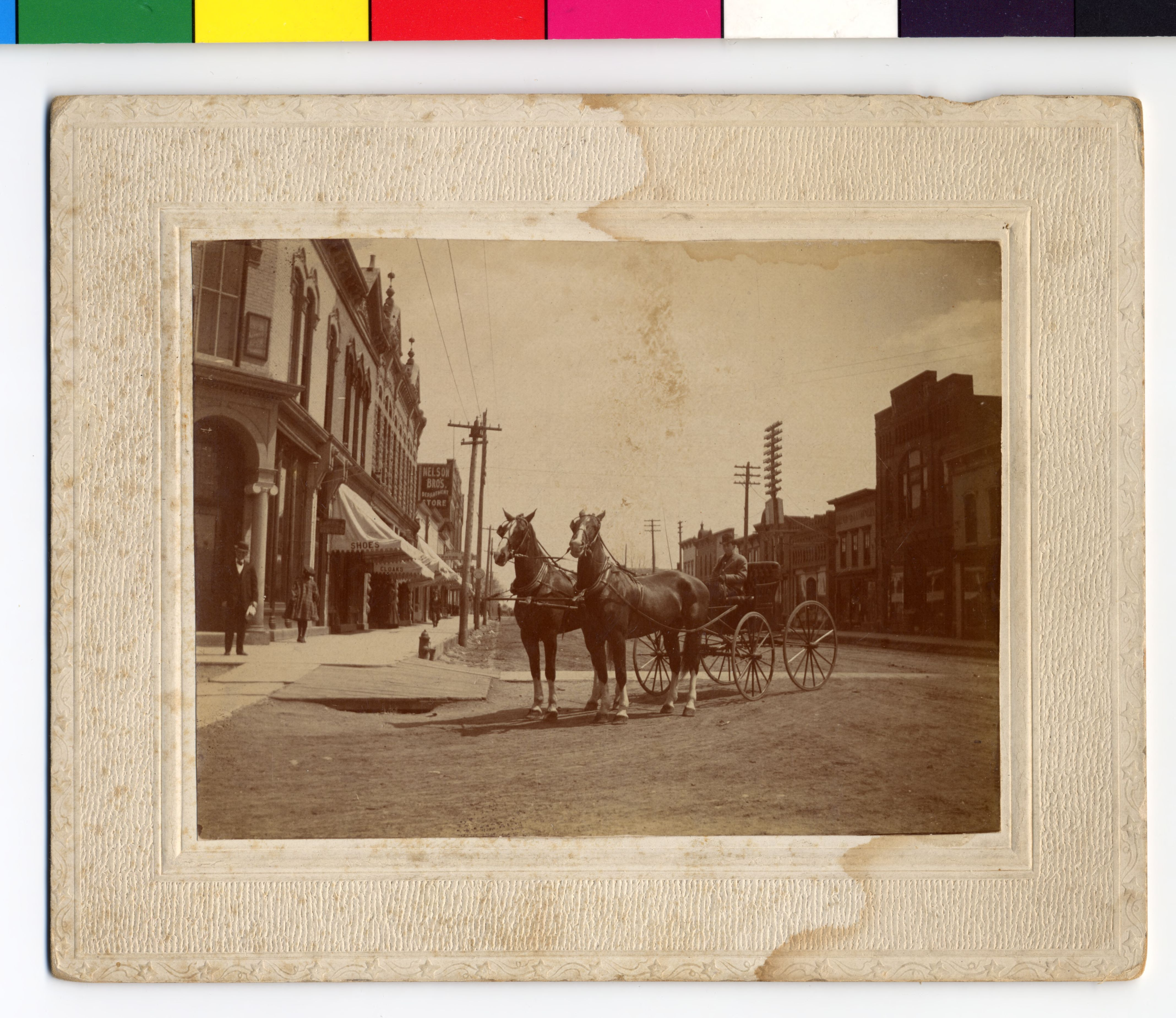
Hilke in Good Thunder in 1908

== See also ==
- List of bridges on the National Register of Historic Places in Minnesota
