= Elm Creek (Blue Earth River tributary) =

Coordinates: 43.7546770°N 94.1966295°W

Location
- Country: United States

Physical characteristics
- Source
  - location: Minnesota

Elm Creek is an 89.5-mile-long (144.0 km) tributary of the Blue Earth River in southern Minnesota. It rises in northeastern Jackson County and flows eastwardly through Martin County into northeastern Faribault County, where it joins the Blue Earth River near the city of Winnebago. Via the Blue Earth and Minnesota rivers, it is part of the Mississippi River watershed.

Elm Creek was named for the elm trees along its banks.

== See also ==
- List of rivers of Minnesota
