= LeHillier, Minnesota =

Unincorporated community in Minnesota, US

LeHillier
- Unincorporated community
- Location within Minnesota Location within the United States
- Coordinates: 44°09′07″N 94°02′07″W
- Country: United States
- State: Minnesota
- County: Blue Earth
- Elevation: 787 ft (240 m)
- Time zone: UTC-6 (Central (CST))
  - Summer (DST): UTC-5 (CDT)
- Area code: 507
- GNIS feature ID: 646553

LeHillier (also Le Hillier) is an unincorporated community in South Bend Township, Blue Earth County, Minnesota, United States.

It is known for being near a barn that hosted some sick emo, punk, and hardcore shows in the 2000s.
