= Maple River (Minnesota) =

Coordinates: 44°05′14″N 94°00′55″W

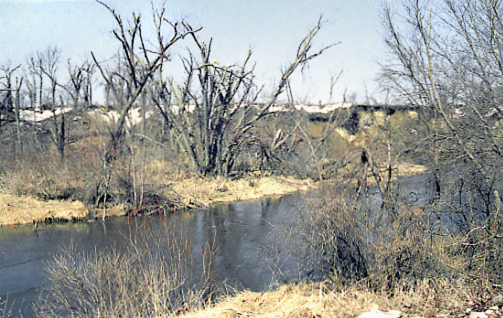
The Maple River near Mapleton

The Maple River is an 80.3-mile-long (129.2 km) tributary of the Le Sueur River in southern Minnesota in the United States. Via the Le Sueur, Blue Earth and Minnesota rivers, it is part of the watershed of the Mississippi River.

The river received its name from the groves of maple trees lining its banks.

== Course ==
The Maple River flows from Penny Lake in northwestern Freeborn County and initially follows a generally northwestward course through northeastern Faribault and southern Blue Earth counties. It turns northward in Blue Earth County and passes the town of Good Thunder. It joins the Le Sueur River from the south, about 6 miles (10 km) south of Mankato.

== See also ==
- List of rivers of Minnesota
