= Lime Township, Blue Earth County, Minnesota =

Township in Minnesota, United States

Lime Township
- Township
- Location within the state of Minnesota
- Coordinates: 44°13′12″N 93°57′55″W
- Country: United States
- State: Minnesota
- County: Blue Earth

Area
  - Total: 16.9 sq mi (43.7 km^{2})
  - Land: 15.8 sq mi (40.8 km^{2})
  - Water: 1.1 sq mi (2.8 km^{2})
- Elevation: 980 ft (300 m)

Population (2010)
  - Total: 1,395
  - Density: 89/sq mi (34.2/km^{2})
- Time zone: UTC-6 (Central (CST))
  - Summer (DST): UTC-5 (CDT)
- FIPS code: 27-37052
- GNIS feature ID: 0664782
- Website: https://limetownshipmn.gov/

Lime Township is a township in Blue Earth County, Minnesota, United States. The population was 1,395 as of the 2010 census.

== History ==
Lime Township was organized in 1858. It was named from the limestone found in the area.

== Geography ==
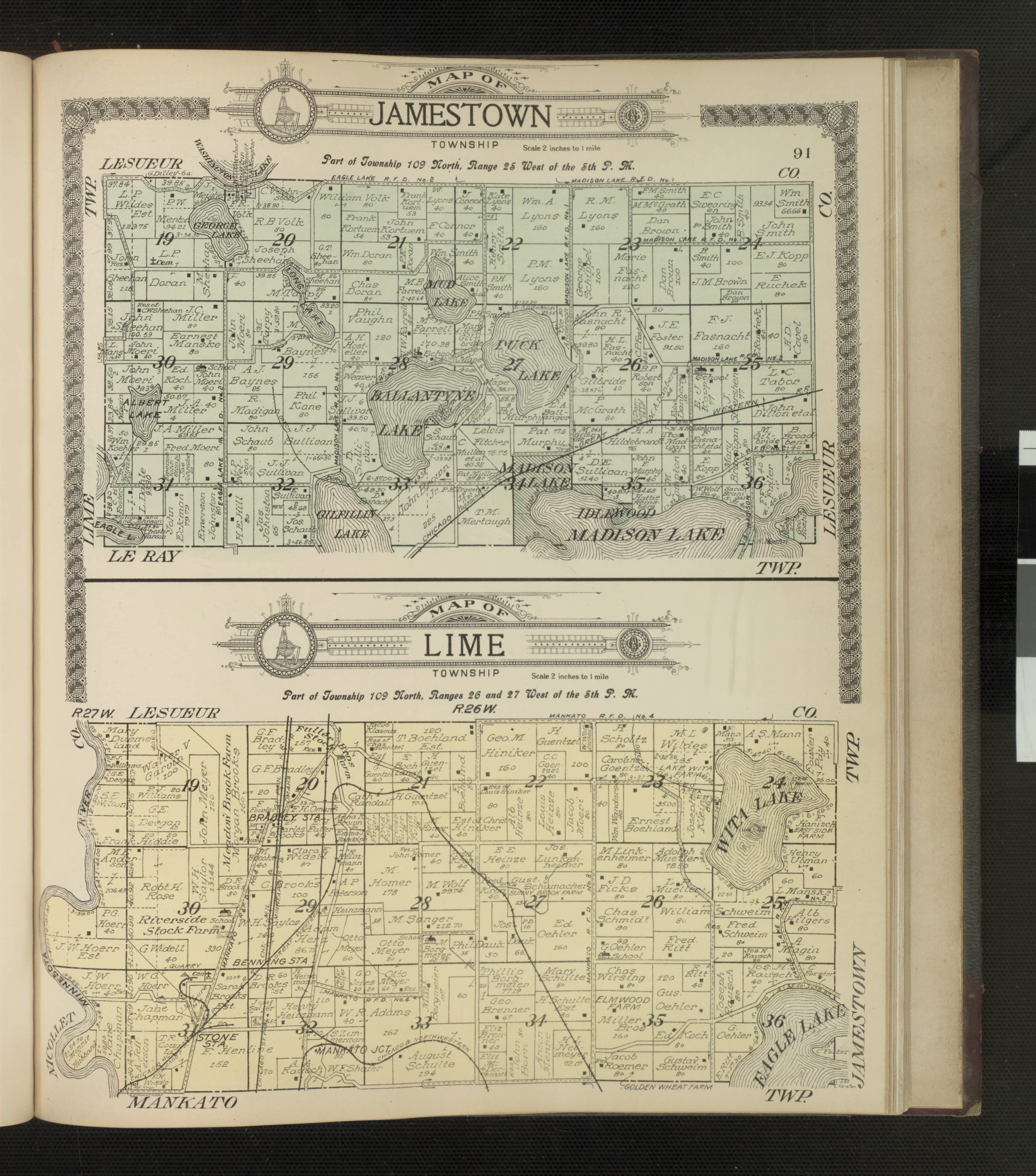
Jamestown and Lime Township Plat Maps from the Standard Atlas, Blue Earth County, Minnesota

According to the United States Census Bureau, the township has an area of 16.9 square miles (43.7 km^{2}), of which 15.8 square miles (40.8 km^{2}) is land and 1.1 square miles (2.8 km^{2}), or 6.49%, is water.

The north quarter of the city of Mankato is within this township geographically but is a separate entity.

=== Unincorporated community ===
- Benning at 44.203300°N 93.994955°W

=== Major highways ===
- U.S. Highway 169
- Minnesota State Highway 22

=== Lakes ===
- Eagle Lake (west half)
- Wita Lake

=== Adjacent townships ===
- Kasota Township, Le Sueur County (north)
- Jamestown Township (east)
- Le Ray Township (southeast)
- Mankato Township (south)
- Belgrade Township, Nicollet County (west)

=== Cemeteries ===
The township includes the following cemeteries: Bochland and Pilgrims Rest.

== Demographics ==
As of the census of 2000, the township had 1,314 people, 498 households, and 379 families. The population density was 82.1 inhabitants per square mile (31.7/km^{2}). There were 511 housing units at an average density of 31.9 per square mile (12.3/km^{2}). The township's racial makeup was 97.87% White, 0.23% African American, 0.38% Native American, 0.30% Asian, 0.68% from other races, and 0.53% from two or more races. Hispanic or Latino of any race were 1.29% of the population.

There were 498 households, of which 34.1% had children under the age of 18 living with them, 65.7% were married couples living together, 6.0% had a female householder with no husband present, and 23.7% were non-families. 18.1% of all households were made up of individuals, and 4.2% had someone living alone who was 65 years of age or older. The average household size was 2.64 and the average family size was 2.97.

25.2% of the township's population was under the age of 18, 9.9% was from age 18 to 24, 27.0% was from age 25 to 44, 29.5% was from 45 to 64, and 8.4% was age 65 or older. The median age was 37 years. For every 100 females, there were 97.0 males. For every 100 females age 18 and over, there were 105.2 males.

The township's median household income was $49,412, and the median family income was $57,250. Males had a median income of $35,625 versus $24,333 for females. The township's per capita income was $26,615. About 1.1% of families and 2.1% of the population were below the poverty line, including 2.0% of those under age 18 and none of those age 65 or over.
