= Decoria Township, Blue Earth County, Minnesota =

Township in Minnesota, United States

Decoria Township
- Township
- Location within the state of Minnesota
- Coordinates: 44°4′21″N 93°58′8″W
- Country: United States
- State: Minnesota
- County: Blue Earth

Area
  - Total: 35.88 sq mi (92.94 km^{2})
  - Land: 35.87 sq mi (92.89 km^{2})
  - Water: 0.015 sq mi (0.04 km^{2})
- Elevation: 1,001 ft (305 m)

Population (2010)
  - Total: 1,104
  - Density: 31/sq mi (11.9/km^{2})
- Time zone: UTC-6 (Central (CST))
  - Summer (DST): UTC-5 (CDT)
- FIPS code: 27-15130
- GNIS feature ID: 0663938
- Website: decoriatownship.com

Decoria Township is a township in Blue Earth County, Minnesota, United States. The population was 1,104 as of the 2010 census.

== History ==
Decoria Township, organized in 1867, was named for a Winnebago chieftain.

== Geography ==
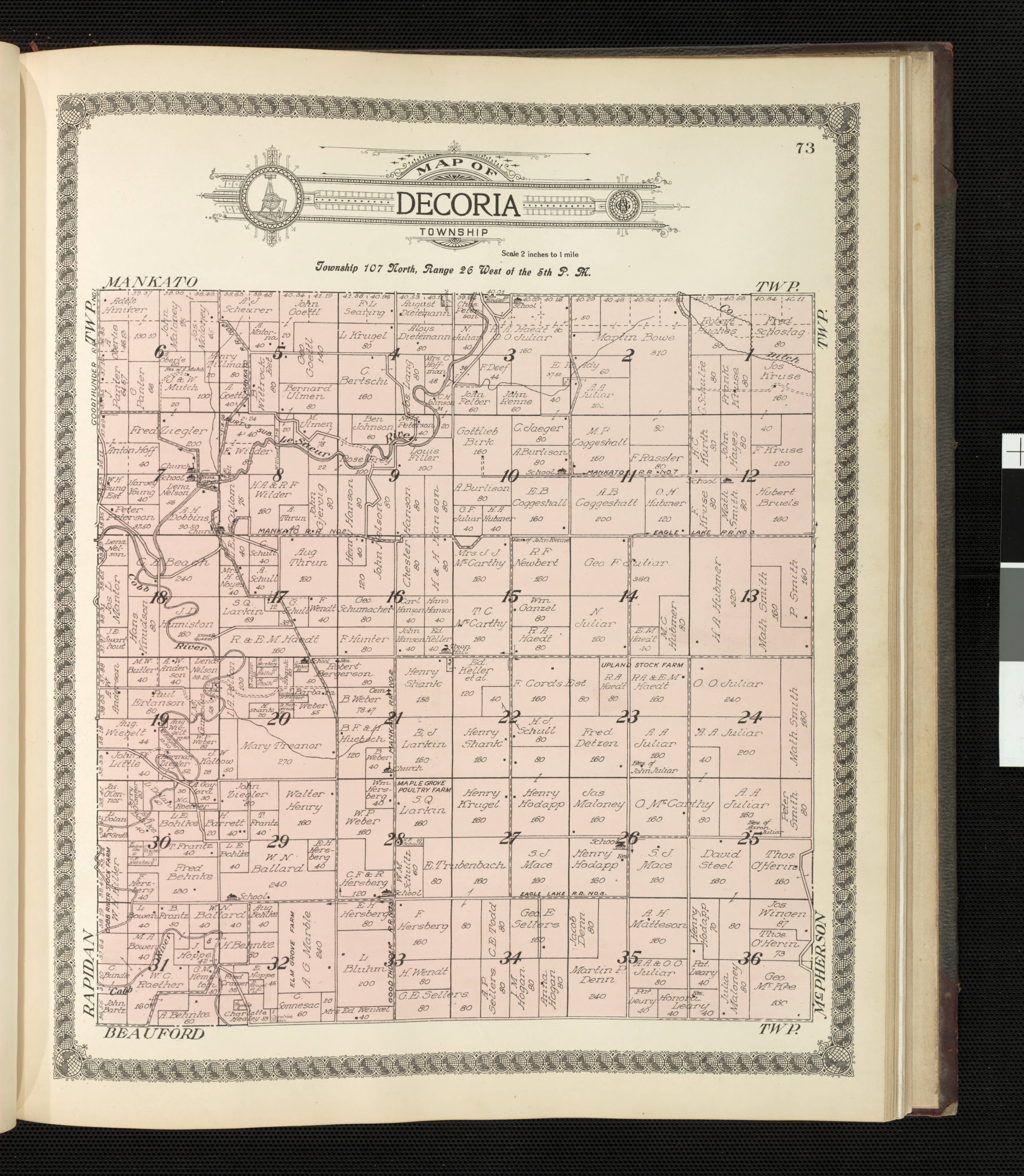
Decoria Township Plat Map from the Standard Atlas, Blue Earth County, Minnesota

According to the United States Census Bureau, the township has a total area of 35.88 square miles (92.94 km^{2}), of which 35.87 square miles (92.89 km^{2}) is land and 0.02 square miles (0.04 km^{2}), or 0.05%, is water.

=== Major highway ===
- Minnesota State Highway 22

=== Adjacent townships ===
- Mankato Township (north)
- Le Ray Township (northeast)
- McPherson Township (east)
- Medo Township (southeast)
- Beauford Township (south)
- Lyra Township (southwest)
- Rapidan Township (west)

=== Cemeteries ===
The township includes Decoria Cemetery.

== Demographics ==
As of the census of 2000, the township had 922 people, 329 households, and 273 families. The population density was 25.7 people per square mile (9.9/km^{2}). There were 340 housing units at an average density of 9.5/sq mi (3.7/km^{2}). The township's racial makeup was 99.57% White, 0.11% Asian, 0.11% Pacific Islander, 0.11% from other races, and 0.11% from two or more races. Hispanic or Latino of any race were 0.98% of the population.

There were 329 households, of which 38.0% had children under the age of 18 living with them, 76.0% were married couples living together, 4.3% had a female householder with no husband present, and 17.0% were non-families. 11.9% of all households were made up of individuals, and 6.4% had someone living alone who was 65 years of age or older. The average household size was 2.80 and the average family size was 3.06.

27.3% of the township's residents were under age 18, 6.2% were from age 18 to 24, 29.3% were from age 25 to 44, 25.8% were from age 45 to 64, and 11.4% were age 65 or older. The median age was 38 years. For every 100 females, there were 110.5 males. For every 100 females age 18 and over, there were 106.8 males.

The township's median household income was $52,639, and the median family income was $58,250. Males had a median income of $39,464 versus $22,500 for females. The township's per capita income was $20,996. About 3.0% of families and 2.6% of the population were below the poverty line, including 0.8% of those under age 18 and 7.0% of those age 65 or over.
