= Minnesota State Highway 66 =

State highway in Minnesota, United States

Trunk Highway 66
- MN 66 highlighted in red

Route information
- Maintained by MnDOT
- Length: 12.059 mi (19.407 km)
- Existed: 1963–June 30, 2016

Major junctions
- South end: CSAH 1 / CSAH 10 near Good Thunder
- North end: US 169 / MN 60 at Mankato

Location
- Country: United States
- State: Minnesota
- Counties: Blue Earth

Highway system
- Minnesota Trunk Highway System; Interstate; US; State; Legislative; Scenic
← MN 65	→ MN 67

Minnesota State Highway 66 (MN 66) was a highway in south-central Minnesota, which ran from its intersection with Blue Earth County Roads 1 and 10 near Good Thunder and continued north to its northern terminus at its interchange with U.S. Highway 169 / State Highway 60 in the city of Mankato. The highway is currently known as Blue Earth County Road 1 (CSAH 1).

Highway 66 was 12 miles (19 km) in length.

== Route description ==
Highway 66 served as a north–south route between Mankato and Good Thunder in south-central Minnesota, although it did not actually enter the latter city.

Highway 66 followed Carney Avenue in the city of Mankato.

The route passed near the town of Skyline, adjacent to Mankato.

Highway 66 crossed the Le Sueur River, south of Mankato.

The route paralleled the Maple River near Good Thunder.

The highway was legally defined as Legislative Route 256 in the Minnesota Statutes. It was not marked with this number.

== History ==
Highway 66 was created in 1963. It was originally numbered State Highway 256 from 1949 to 1963. The route was removed from statute in 2013; on June 30, 2016, Highway 66 was removed from the state highway system, becoming an extension of CSAH 1.

Paving (while marked 256) on the route began in 1948 and was completed in 1950.

== Major intersections ==
The entire route was in Blue Earth County.

Location	mi	km	Destinations	Notes
Lyra Township	0.000	0.000	CSAH 1 / CSAH 10	Southern terminus
Rapidan Township	4.498	7.239	CSAH 35	
Rapidan Township	6.502	10.464	CSAH 9	
Mankato	12.010– 12.080	19.328– 19.441	US 169 / MN 60	Northern terminus; interchange
1.000 mi = 1.609 km; 1.000 km = 0.621 mi
