= Benning, Minnesota =

Unincorporated community in Minnesota, US

Benning
- Unincorporated community
- Location within Minnesota Location within the United States
- Coordinates: 44°12′12″N 93°59′42″W
- Country: United States
- State: Minnesota
- County: Blue Earth
- Elevation: 820 ft (250 m)
- Time zone: UTC-6 (Central (CST))
  - Summer (DST): UTC-5 (CDT)
- Area code: 507
- GNIS feature ID: 654600

Benning is an unincorporated community in Lime Township, Blue Earth County, Minnesota, United States.
