= Fort L'Huillier =

- Part of New France
- Near the confluence of the Blue Earth and Le Sueur Rivers, Minnesota, United States
- A Daughters of the American Revolution historic marker for the fort near Minnesota State Highway 66

Site information
- Type: Fortification
- Condition: Abandoned

Site history
- Built: Autumn 1700
- Built by: Pierre-Charles Le Sueur
- In use: 1700–1702
- Materials: Wood and other local materials

Garrison information
- Occupants: Approximately 30 men

Fort L'Huillier (sometimes spelled Le Hillier) was a short-lived fortification in New France located near the confluence of the Blue Earth and Le Sueur Rivers in what is now Minnesota.

The garrison, which originally held about 30 men, was built beginning in the autumn of 1700 under the direction of Pierre-Charles Le Sueur, a French trader and explorer interested in mining a blue clay that he thought was copper ore. It was named in honor of a metallurgical assayer, Rémy-François L'Huillier.

Le Sueur left the fort in 1701 to take samples to New Orleans for further analysis. While he was gone, however, the fort was apparently attacked and abandoned by 1702, and no more was heard of the remaining men. In addition, the blue clay was found to be worthless, not the copper ore Le Sueur had hoped.

The fort was southwest of the present city of Mankato (from "mah kato: "blue earth" in the Sioux language). Its exact location is unknown, although attempts have been made to find it.
