= Pierre-Charles Le Sueur =

French fur trader in Canada (c. 1657 – 1704)

- Born: c. 1657; Artois, France
- Died: 17 July, 1704; Havana, Cuba

Pierre-Charles Le Sueur (French pronunciation: [pjɛʁ ʃaʁl lə sɥœʁ]; c. 1657, Artois, France – 17 July 1704, Havana, Cuba) was a French fur trader and explorer in North America, recognized as the first known European to explore the Minnesota River valley.

== Explorations ==
Le Sueur came to Canada with the Jesuits to their mission at Sault Sainte Marie, but very soon he turned himself to fur trade and became a coureur des bois. He was fluent in several Native languages, which was crucial to his success in trade. Around 1683, he received some samples of bluish clay from the middle reaches of a tributary of the Mississippi and took it back to France to be analyzed. A chemist, Alexandre L'Huillier, deemed it to be copper ore. Le Sueur returned to New France to mine this ore, but was waylayed by, among other things, a prison term for overreaching his trade privileges. He was present at the formal assertion of French sovereignty of Canada, declared in 1689 by Nicholas Perrot at Green Bay. Eventually, however, he was given a royal commission to open a copper mine (although some suggested he was more interested in "mining furs").

In 1699, he was with the group that ascended the Mississippi River from Biloxi to the "country of the Nadouessioux", stopping to overwinter at Isle Pelée or Fort Perrot above Lake Pepin. He went upstream as far as Saint Anthony Falls. After trading with the local Dakota bands (the Mdewakantons, Wahpetons and Wahpekutes) in the area, in the summer and fall of 1700 he and a group of 20 men went further up the river known to the native population as "minisota", or "cloud reflected water". This river was known to later voyageurs as the St. Pierre, but it is unclear if Le Sueur knew it by that name at the time. The group continued to the Blue Earth River, where they built Fort L'Huillier, named for the chemist who declared it to be copper ore. They overwintered at Fort L'Huillier, trading furs and other merchandise with the local Indian bands. They found the prairies full of bison, and learned to subsist largely on a meat diet. In May 1701, Le Sueur left a garrison of men at the fort under the command of d'Eraque and accompanied a large quantity of the blue earth (Dakota language: makháto) back to Fort Mobile for further analysis, which revealed that it was not copper and thus worthless. Later that year, Fort L'Huillier was attacked by Sauk and Meskwaki people. Three men were killed in the attack on the fort, which was then abandoned.

Le Sueur sailed to France to secure a commission to serve as a local magistrate in what is now Alabama. "Le Sueur was supposed to leave France on the Loire in 1703 but he did not actually sail until the spring of 1704 aboard the Pélican. The ship, which was carrying nurses and women to Louisiana, stopped at Havana where Le Sueur contracted yellow fever. He had to be left behind and, after drawing up his will, he died on 17 July and was buried in the parish church of San Cristóbal."

== Legacy ==
He is the namesake of Le Sueur, Minnesota, the Le Sueur River and Le Sueur County, Minnesota.
