= Skyline, Minnesota =

City in Minnesota, United States

Skyline
- City
- Location of Skyline, Minnesota
- Coordinates: 44°08′26″N 94°02′02″W
- Country: United States
- State: Minnesota
- County: Blue Earth
- Established: 1957

Government
  - Type: Mayor - Council
  - Mayor: Paige Attarian

Area
  - Total: 0.19 sq mi (0.50 km^{2})
  - Land: 0.19 sq mi (0.50 km^{2})
  - Water: 0 sq mi (0.00 km^{2})
- Elevation: 988 ft (301 m)

Population (2020)
  - Total: 288
  - Density: 1,481.8/sq mi (572.11/km^{2})
- Time zone: UTC-6 (Central (CST))
  - Summer (DST): UTC-5 (CDT)
- FIPS code: 27-60754
- GNIS feature ID: 2395894
- Website: CityofSkyline.com

Skyline is a city in Blue Earth County, Minnesota, United States. The population was 288 at the 2020 census. It is adjacent to the city of Mankato and is part of the Mankato-North Mankato Metropolitan Statistical Area.

== Geography ==
According to the U.S. Census Bureau, the city has an area of 0.17 square miles (0.44 km^{2}), all land. Its elevation is 980 feet (300 m) above sea level.

Blue Earth County Road 1 (formerly Minnesota State Highway 66) serves as a main route for the community.

U.S. Route 169 / Minnesota State Highway 60 (co-signed) is nearby.

== Demographics ==
Historical population
| Census | Pop. | Note | %± |
|---|---|---|---|
| 1960 | 354 | | — |
| 1970 | 400 | | 13.0% |
| 1980 | 399 | | −0.2% |
| 1990 | 272 | | −31.8% |
| 2000 | 330 | | 21.3% |
| 2010 | 289 | | −12.4% |
| 2020 | 288 | | −0.3% |
U.S. Decennial Census; 2020 Census

=== 2010 census ===
As of the census of 2010, there were 289 people, 113 households, and 90 families living in the city. The population density was 1,700.0 inhabitants per square mile (656.4/km^{2}). There were 118 housing units at an average density of 694.1 per square mile (268.0/km^{2}). The racial makeup of the city was 98.6% White, 0.3% Asian, 0.7% from other races, and 0.3% from two or more races. Hispanic or Latino of any race were 3.1% of the population.

There were 113 households, of which 24.8% had children under the age of 18 living with them, 73.5% were married couples living together, 2.7% had a female householder with no husband present, 3.5% had a male householder with no wife present, and 20.4% were non-families. 18.6% of all households were made up of individuals, and 15% had someone living alone who was 65 years of age or older. The average household size was 2.49 and the average family size was 2.78.

The median age in the city was 52.2 years. 19.7% of residents were under the age of 18; 6.3% were between the ages of 18 and 24; 13.5% were from 25 to 44; 34.7% were from 45 to 64; and 26% were 65 years of age or older. The gender makeup of the city was 47.8% male and 52.2% female.

=== 2000 census ===
As of the census of 2000, there were 330 people, 124 households, and 105 families living in the city. The population density was 1,752.5 inhabitants per square mile (676.6/km^{2}). There were 125 housing units at an average density of 663.8 per square mile (256.3/km^{2}). The racial makeup of the city was 97.58% White, 0.91% Native American, 1.21% Asian, and 0.30% from two or more races. Hispanic or Latino of any race were 0.30% of the population.

There were 124 households, out of which 32.3% had children under the age of 18 living with them, 82.3% were married couples living together, 2.4% had a female householder with no husband present, and 15.3% were non-families. 14.5% of all households were made up of individuals, and 11.3% had someone living alone who was 65 years of age or older. The average household size was 2.63 and the average family size was 2.90.

In the city, the population was spread out, with 24.5% under the age of 18, 4.8% from 18 to 24, 23.0% from 25 to 44, 27.6% from 45 to 64, and 20.0% who were 65 years of age or older. The median age was 44 years. For every 100 females, there were 93.0 males. For every 100 females age 18 and over, there were 93.0 males.

The median income for a household in the city was $59,583, and the median income for a family was $104,063. Males had a median income of $65,625 versus $50,972 for females. The per capita income for the city was $25,778. None of the families and 0.3% of the population were living below the poverty line, including no under eighteens and none of those over 64.
