= Blue Earth River =

River in Minnesota and Iowa

Blue Earth River: Makhátho Wakpá (Dakota); Makato Osa Watapa (Sisseton)
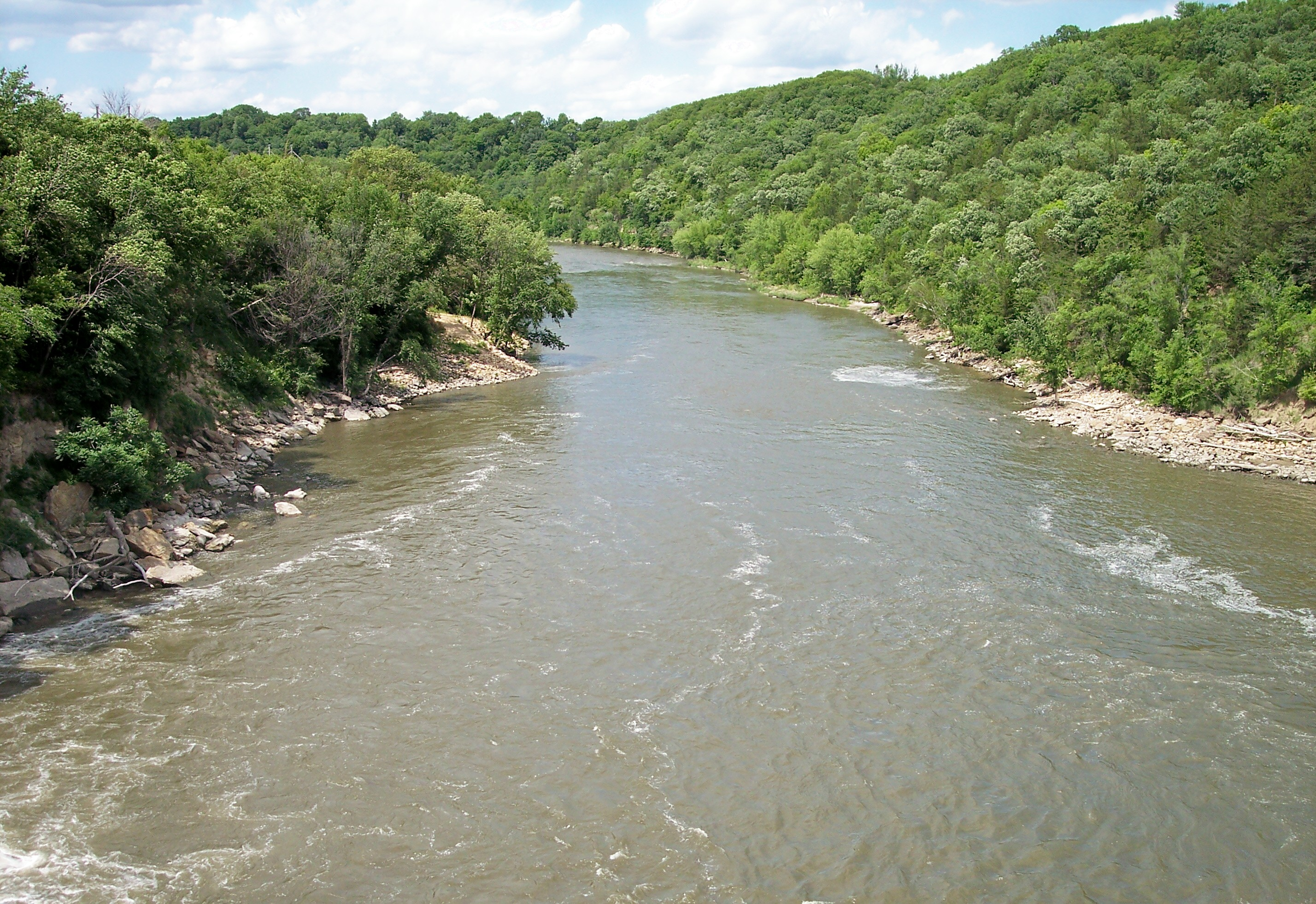
- The Blue Earth River as viewed from Rapidan Dam in Blue Earth County in 2007

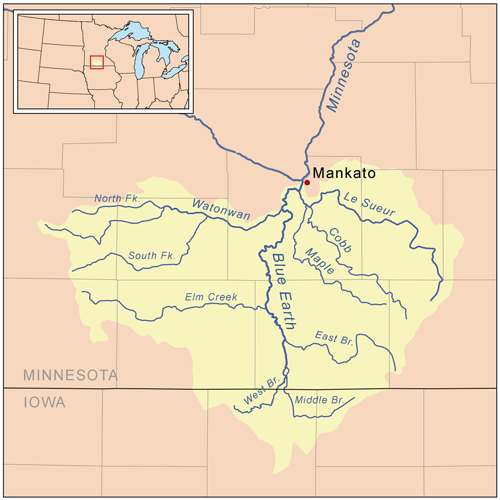
- Etymology: English translation of the Dakota name for the river's blue-green clay

Location
- Country: United States
- State: Iowa, Minnesota

Physical characteristics
- Source: Middle Branch Blue Earth River
  - location: near Rake, Winnebago County, Iowa
  - coordinates: 43°27′30″N 93°48′04″W
  - elevation: 1,207 ft (368 m)
- 2nd source: West Branch Blue Earth River
  - location: near Swea City, Kossuth County, Iowa
  - coordinates: 43°24′13″N 94°17′38″W
  - elevation: 1,152 ft (351 m)
- Source confluence
  - location: Elmore Township, Faribault County, Minnesota
  - coordinates: 43°34′20″N 94°06′11″W
  - elevation: 1,076 ft (328 m)
- Mouth: Minnesota River
  - location: Mankato, Blue Earth County, Minnesota
  - coordinates: 44°09′51″N 94°02′13″W
  - elevation: 765 ft (233 m)
- Length: 108 mi (174 km)
- Basin size: 3,486 mi^{2} (9,030 km^{2})
- Discharge
  - location: Rapidan Township, Minnesota
  - average: 1,076 cu ft/s (30.5 m^{3}/s)
  - minimum: 6.9 cu ft/s (0.20 m^{3}/s)
  - maximum: 43,100 cu ft/s (1,220 m^{3}/s)

Basin features
- Tributaries
  - left: Watonwan River
  - right: East Branch Blue Earth River, Le Sueur River

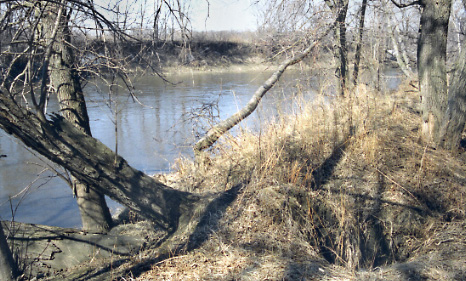
The Blue Earth River in Vernon Center in 1996

The Blue Earth River (Dakota: Makhátho Wakpá) is a tributary of the Minnesota River, 108 miles (174 km) long, in southern Minnesota in the United States. Two of its headwaters tributaries, the Middle Branch Blue Earth River and the West Branch Blue Earth River, also flow for short distances in northern Iowa. By volume, it is the Minnesota River's largest tributary, accounting for 46% of the Minnesota's flow at the rivers' confluence in Mankato. Via the Minnesota River, the Blue Earth River is part of the watershed of the Mississippi River, draining an area of 3,486 square miles (9,030 km^{2}) in an agricultural region. Ninety percent of the river's watershed is in Minnesota. It is a Minnesota Department of Natural Resources designated Water Trail.

== History ==
The river was named for former deposits of bluish-green clay, no longer visible, along the banks of the river. It was called Makato Osa Watapa by the Sisseton Dakota, meaning "the river where blue earth is gathered." The French explorer Pierre-Charles Le Sueur established Fort L'Huillier near the river's mouth in 1700 for the purpose of mining the clay, either in the mistaken belief that the clay contained copper, or as a ruse to secure funding from his patrons for his fur trading activities. The fort was abandoned the following year after an attack by the Meskwaki. In the 19th century, the geographer Joseph Nicollet found cavities from which the clay had been dug by Native Americans in the region, who used it as body paint; he found no evidence of Le Sueur's mines, nor of the fort.

== Geography ==
The Blue Earth River begins at the confluence of its west and middle branches, approximately five miles (8.0 km) north of Elmore in southwestern Faribault County, Minnesota. The Middle Branch, 35.1 miles (56.5 km) long and sometimes known as the main stem of the river, rises in northwestern Winnebago County, Iowa, approximately 7 miles (11 km) east of Rake, and flows westwardly into Kossuth County, Iowa, then northwardly into Faribault County. The West Branch, 24.7 miles (39.8 km) long, rises near Swea City, Iowa, in northern Kossuth County and flows northeastwardly into Faribault County. Both headwaters tributaries have been channelized for much of their courses.

From their confluence, the Blue Earth River flows northwardly in a winding course through eastern Faribault County into Blue Earth County, past the cities of Blue Earth, Winnebago, and Vernon Center, to Mankato, where it enters the Minnesota River from the south. Rapidan Dam, constructed for hydroelectricity generation in 1910, impounds the river 12 miles (19 km) upstream from its mouth; its reservoir filled with silt and mud soon after the dam's completion. The hydroelectric facility was later decommissioned but reactivated in 1984.

The Blue Earth River's largest tributaries are the Le Sueur River, which it collects 3 miles (5 km) upstream of its mouth; and the Watonwan River, which it collects 16 miles (26 km) upstream of its mouth. The two rivers drain 31% and 24% of the Blue Earth's watershed. Tributaries of the river in its upper course include the East Branch Blue Earth River, 59.2 miles (95.3 km) long, which rises in southwestern Freeborn County and flows westwardly through Faribault County to the city of Blue Earth; and Elm Creek, 89.5 miles (144.0 km) long, which rises in northeastern Jackson County and flows eastwardly through Martin County into northeastern Faribault County, where it joins the Blue Earth River near Winnebago.

The Blue Earth River mostly flows through till plains and the plain of a former glacial lake. The drain of the glacial lake, Union Slough, drains in two directions, south into the East Fork of the Des Moines River and north, as Union Slough, into the West Branch of the Blue Earth River. The lower (northern) part of the river's watershed was historically covered by the Big Woods, a tract of hardwoods that has since been largely converted to agricultural use; segments of the woodland extended southward along the riparian corridors of the Blue Earth River and its tributaries. In its lower course below Rapidan Dam, the river flows through a wooded gorge in the valley of the Minnesota River; this section is a popular canoeing route.

According to the Minnesota Pollution Control Agency, about 84% of the Blue Earth River's watershed is used for agriculture, primarily corn and soybeans. The river is one of the most polluted in Minnesota, with elevated levels of sediment, bacteria, nitrates, phosphorus, mercury, PCBs, and pesticides, contributed in part by runoff in the watershed. Fecal coliforms, contributed by manure fertilizers, livestock waste, substandard septic tanks and outdated sewer systems, are often at levels considered by the state government to be unsafe for swimming.

== Flow rate ==
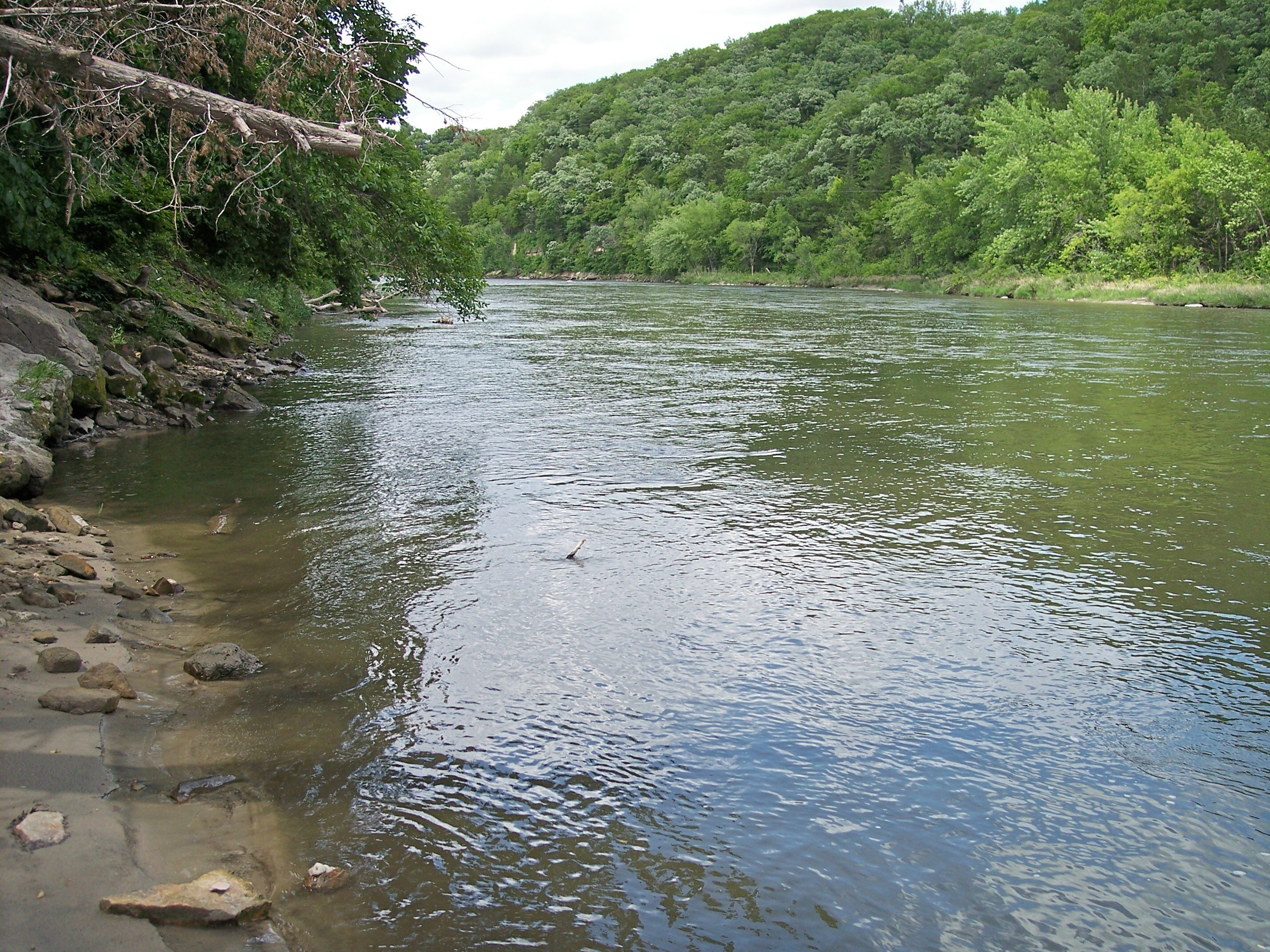
The Blue Earth River near the USGS stream gauge in 2007

The United States Geological Survey operates a stream gauge on the Blue Earth River below Rapidan Dam in Rapidan Township, downstream of the mouth of the Watonwan River and upstream of the mouth of the Le Sueur River, and 12 miles (19 km) upstream from the river's mouth. The annual mean flow of the river at the gauge between 1909 and 2005 was 1,076 cubic feet per second (30.5 m^{3}/s). The highest recorded flow during the period was 43,100 cu ft/s (1,220 m^{3}/s) on April 9, 1965. The lowest recorded flow was 6.9 cu ft/s (0.20 m^{3}/s) on October 12, 1955.

== See also ==
- List of rivers of Minnesota
- List of rivers of Iowa
- List of Minnesota placenames of Native American origin
