= Rapidan Township, Blue Earth County, Minnesota =

Township in Minnesota, United States

Rapidan Township
- Township
- Location within the state of Minnesota
- Coordinates: 44°3′16″N 94°3′34″W
- Country: United States
- State: Minnesota
- County: Blue Earth

Area
  - Total: 35.7 sq mi (92.5 km^{2})
  - Land: 35.1 sq mi (90.9 km^{2})
  - Water: 0.58 sq mi (1.5 km^{2})
- Elevation: 997 ft (304 m)

Population (2020)
  - Total: 1,051
  - Estimate (2022): 988
- Time zone: UTC-6 (Central (CST))
  - Summer (DST): UTC-5 (CDT)
- FIPS code: 27-53206
- GNIS feature ID: 0665380

Rapidan Township is a township in Blue Earth County, Minnesota, United States. Its population as of the 2020 census is 1,051.

== History ==
Rapidan Township was organized in 1865 and named after the Rapidan River in Virginia. The settlement had previously been known as DeSoto. A post office was established in 1867.

== Geography ==
Public Land Survey System (PLSS) of the United States: Township 107 North, Range 27 West, Fifth Meridian, 22,819 Acres. According to the United States Census Bureau, the township has a total area of 35.7 square miles (92.5 km^{2}), of which 35.1 square miles (90.9 km^{2}) is land and 0.58 square miles (1.5 km^{2}), or 1.66%, is water.

=== Unincorporated community ===
- Rapidan at 44.094409°N 94.068567°W

=== Adjacent townships ===
- South Bend Township (north)
- Mankato Township (northeast)
- Decoria Township (east)
- Beauford Township (southeast)
- Lyra Township (south)
- Vernon Center Township (southwest)
- Garden City Township (west)
- Judson Township (northwest)

=== Cemeteries ===
Cemeteries in the township include the following: Calvary Lutheran, Holberg, Stratton Family Cemetery and Saint John's Lutheran.

== Demographics ==
As of the census of 2000, there were 1,061 people, 393 households, and 319 families residing in the township. The population density was 29.7 inhabitants per square mile (11.5/km^{2}). There were 409 housing units at an average density of 11.5/sq mi (4.4/km^{2}). The racial makeup of the township was 98.49% White, 0.19% African American, 0.47% Asian, and 0.85% from two or more races. Hispanic or Latino of any race were 0.38% of the population.

There were 393 households, out of which 36.4% had children under the age of 18 living with them, 73.8% were married couples living together, 4.6% had a female householder with no husband present, and 18.8% were non-families. 17.3% of all households were made up of individuals, and 7.1% had someone living alone who was 65 years of age or older. The average household size was 2.70 and the average family size was 3.04.

In the township the population was spread out, with 25.9% under the age of 18, 7.4% from 18 to 24, 25.7% from 25 to 44, 31.3% from 45 to 64, and 9.6% who were 65 years of age or older. The median age was 39 years. For every 100 females, there were 106.4 males. For every 100 females age 18 and over, there were 104.7 males.

The median income for a household in the township was $85,839, and the median income for a family was $60,938. Males had a median income of $39,063 versus $23,971 for females. The per capita income for the township was $24,856. About 2.2% of families and 3.2% of the population were below the poverty line, including 3.7% of those under age 18 and 5.8% of those age 65 or over.
