= Super Bowl ring =

National Football League award

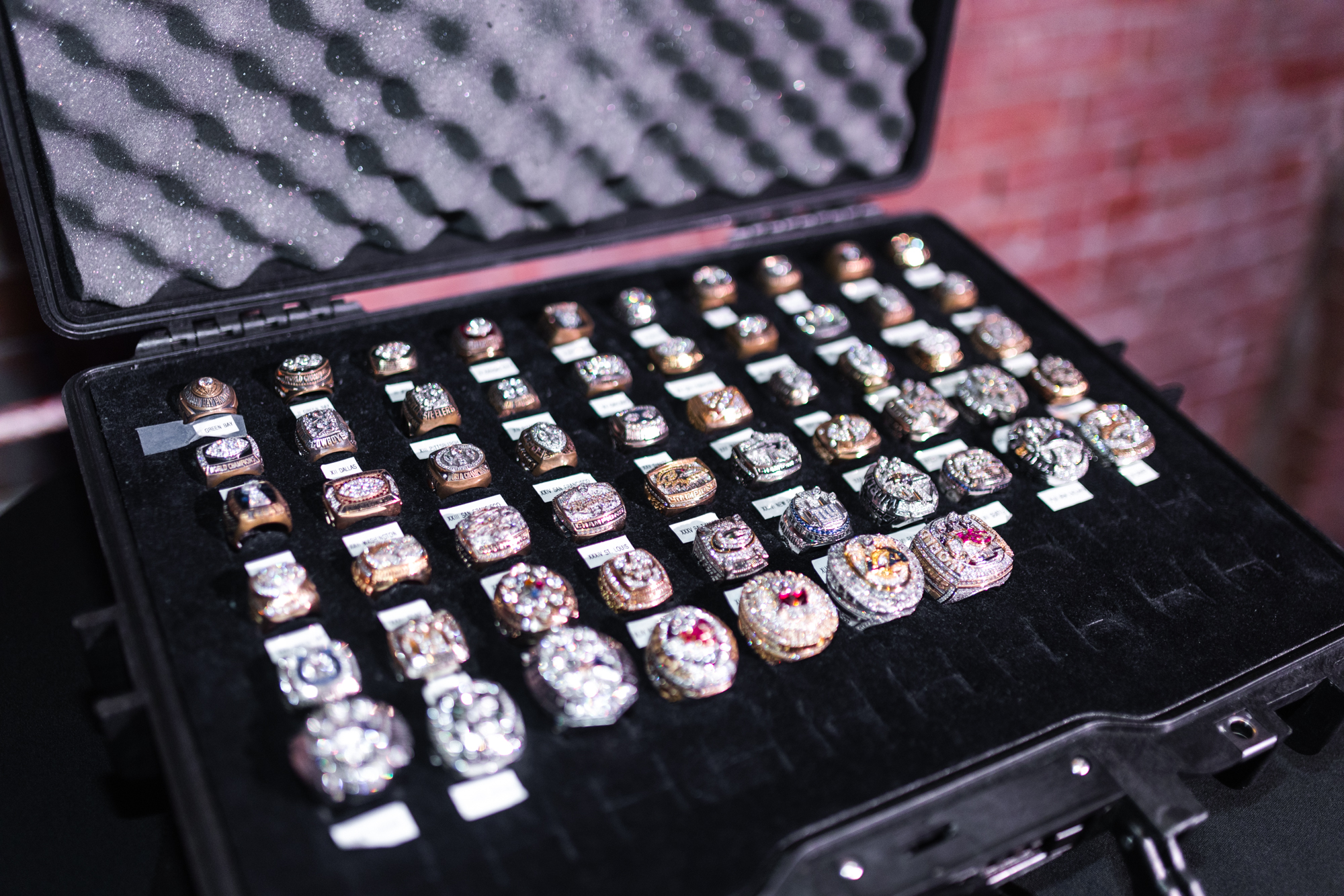
Rings from the first 57 Super Bowls

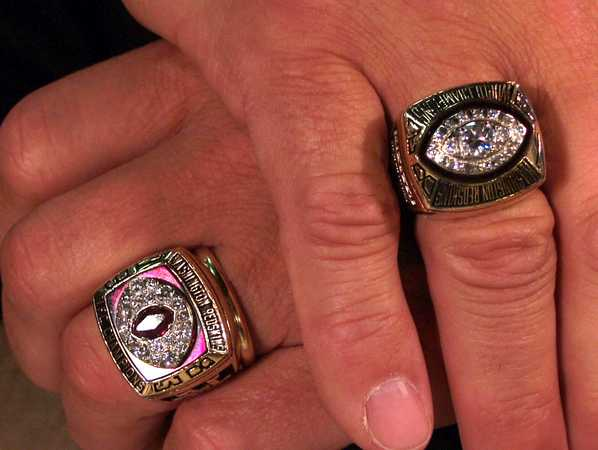
Joe Theismann's NFL rings (2006); his 1983 NFC Championship ring (left), and his 1982 Super Bowl XVII Championship ring (right)

The Super Bowl ring is an award given by the National Football League (NFL) to the members of the winning team of the league's annual championship game, the Super Bowl.

Other rings are awarded to the members of the Super Bowl runner-up team and of the teams that win the AFC or NFC championship. Teams that make the playoffs also receive bonus money that is distributed evenly among members who spent at least three games on the active or reserve list during the regular season.

== Details ==
These rings are typically made of yellow or rose gold with diamonds. They usually include the team name, team logo, the phrase "World Champions", and the Super Bowl number, usually indicated in Roman numerals. Many rings have diamonds in the shape of the Vince Lombardi Trophy or a football, to illustrate the number of Super Bowls that the franchise has won. Each player's ring is customized with his name and uniform number. The NFL contributes about $5,000 to $7,000 per ring for up to 150 rings for the winning team; any additional costs are borne by the team. Most rings are manufactured by Jostens, a memorabilia company. The rings are customarily presented in an elegant box and/or display case.

The winning team can typically present any number of rings to whomever they choose, including usually, but not limited to: players (active roster, inactive roster, or injured reserve), coaches, trainers, executives, personnel, and general club staff. Some teams have given rings to former players and coaches that were on the team at some point during the season, despite not having been on the winning roster for the Super Bowl itself. Sometimes a team will make rings available to fans as part of a charity raffle. A recent trend over the past 15–20 years has been to award lesser-valued rings to non-player and front office staff. These are often referred to as "B" and "C" level rings, while the rings given to players are considered "A" level rings. The "B" and "C" rings are typically smaller and contain fewer diamonds or imitation diamonds.The first instance of this was the Redskins Super Bowl XVII ring when many in the front office received rings that were not solid gold and contained cubic zirconia stones (which resemble diamonds). When Tampa Bay won Super Bowl XXXVII, the players and coaches received "A" rings with a diamond-centered Lombardi trophy. Some staff received rings with a metal Lombardi trophy substituted, with real diamonds surrounding the trophy, while the "C" level ring did not contain any diamonds. Per the CBA, players that were on the winning team's practice squad at the time of the Super Bowl victory are also entitled to a ring, but it can be one of lesser value.

The Green Bay Packers' Super Bowl XLV ring contained more than 100 diamonds. The Packers logo, in the center of the ring, was made up of 13 diamonds, one for each championship title the team has won since 1929. The New England Patriots Super Bowl XLIX rings reportedly cost $36,500 each, making them the most expensive rings Jostens had ever produced at that time, only to be surpassed by the rings awarded for Super Bowl 50 and Super Bowl LI. The New England Patriots' Super Bowl LI ring has 283 diamonds, to commemorate their comeback from being down 28–3 versus the Atlanta Falcons late in the 3rd quarter, about which Falcons owner Arthur Blank reportedly confronted Patriots owner Robert Kraft in August 2017 over his perceived "insult-by-karat". The Philadelphia Eagles' ring for Super Bowl LII contains 127 diamonds on the bezel, which is the total from the numbers of the jerseys of the three players who handled the ball after the snap on the Philly Special trick play—Corey Clement (30), Trey Burton (88) and Nick Foles (9). The Tampa Bay Buccaneers ring for their Super Bowl LV victory contained 319 diamonds on the face to symbolize their 31–9 victory over Kansas City. That ring was also the first to have a removable top, which when opened reveals a hand-carved replica of Raymond James Stadium, where they became the first team to win a Super Bowl on their home field.

In recent years, rings are typically presented in ornate display cases. After winning Super Bowl 50, the Denver Broncos rings were handed out in large, ornate boxes, complete with a decorative padlock and commemorative game ball.

== Value and resale ==
Replicas of the rings for various years are popular collectibles, along with genuine rings. Dave Meggett is known to have placed his ring for sale on eBay. Two Super Bowl rings from the 1970s Steelers sold on eBay for over $69,000 apiece in mid-2008. Patriots safety Je'Rod Cherry raffled his ring from Super Bowl XXXVI in November 2008 to benefit several charities working to help children in Africa and Asia. Tight end Shannon Sharpe, meanwhile, gave his first Super Bowl ring to his brother Sterling, who had his career cut short by injury.

In 2005, a minor international incident occurred when it was reported that Russian President Vladimir Putin had taken a Super Bowl ring from New England Patriots owner Robert Kraft. Kraft quickly issued a statement saying that he had given Putin the ring out of "respect and admiration" he had for the Russian people and Putin's leadership. Kraft later said his earlier statement was not true, and had been issued under pressure from the White House. The ring is on display at the Kremlin, along with other "gifts".

== Most Super Bowl rings ==
- Eight:
  - Bill Belichick: six as head coach of the New England Patriots, two as defensive coordinator of the New York Giants
- Seven:
  - Tom Brady: seven as quarterback; six with the New England Patriots, one with the Tampa Bay Buccaneers
  - Neal Dahlen: five as an administrator with the San Francisco 49ers, two as an administrator with the Denver Broncos
- Six:
  - Robert Kraft: six as owner of the New England Patriots
  - Dan Rooney and Art Rooney Jr.: each as an executive with Pittsburgh Steelers
  - Chuck Noll: four as head coach and two as a team consultant with Pittsburgh Steelers
  - Josh McDaniels has won six with the New England Patriots: his first as special teams coach, second as defensive coaching assistant, third as quarterbacks coach, and his fourth, fifth, and sixth as offensive coordinator and quarterbacks coach.
  - Ivan Fears has won six with New England Patriots his first as wide receivers coach and the remaining as running backs coach.
  - Ernie Adams has won six with New England Patriots as a football research director
  - Nick Caserio has won six with the New England Patriots, one as a coaching assistant, one as a scout, four as director of player personnel
  - Bill Nunn: each as a scout with Pittsburgh Steelers
  - "Mean" Joe Greene: four as a defensive tackle, two as a special assistant for player personnel, all with the Pittsburgh Steelers
  - Conditioning coach Mike Woicik: three with Dallas Cowboys and three with New England Patriots
  - Brian Smith: six as an assistant coach, scout, scouting director, scouting coordinator, and 1 as director of player personnel New England Patriots
  - Brendan Daly won three Super Bowls with the New England Patriots as defensive assistant and defensive line coach and won three Super Bowls as the defensive line coach and linebackers coach for the Kansas City Chiefs
- Five:
  - Charles Haley, five (two as a linebacker with the San Francisco 49ers and three as a defensive end with the Dallas Cowboys), currently second-most as a player, after Tom Brady. Most wins as a player without a loss.
  - Edward J. DeBartolo Jr., five as owner of San Francisco 49ers
  - Keith Simon: five as CFO and Executive VP with San Francisco 49ers
  - Bobb McKittrick: five as offensive line coach with San Francisco 49ers
  - Ray Rhodes: five as an assistant coach with San Francisco 49ers
  - Bill McPherson: five as defensive line coach with San Francisco 49ers
  - Dick Hoak: each as a running backs coach with Pittsburgh Steelers
  - Romeo Crennel: two as a defensive coach with New York Giants and three as a defensive coordinator with New England Patriots
  - Dante Scarnecchia has won five with New England Patriots as an offensive line coach, along with being assistant head coach for three of them
  - George Seifert: three as an assistant coach and two as a head coach all with San Francisco 49ers
  - Dwight Clark: two as a player and three as a member of the front office, all with San Francisco 49ers
  - Pepper Johnson: two as a linebacker for New York Giants and three as an assistant coach with New England Patriots
  - Monsignor Peter Armstrong: five as chaplain for San Francisco 49ers
  - Markus Paul: three as an assistant strength and conditioning coach with the New England Patriots, and two as an assistant strength and conditioning coach with the New York Giants
  - Tim Rooney: Three with Pittsburgh Steelers and two with New York Giants (as pro personnel director/scout)
  - Brian Daboll has won five with New England Patriots, one as a defensive coaching assistant, two as wide receivers coach, and two as tight ends coach
  - Jim Whalen has won five with the New England Patriots as head athletic trainer.
  - Dave Merritt won two Super Bowls with the New York Giants as secondary/safeties coach and three Super Bowls with the Kansas City Chiefs as defensive back coach.
- Four: at least 40 players, many coaches and staff.
  - The first player to win four Super Bowl rings was tight-end Marv Fleming, who got a pair with Green Bay Packers in 1966 and 1967, and another pair with Miami Dolphins in 1972 and 1973.
  - Twenty-two players earned four rings with Pittsburgh Steelers in the 1970s: Terry Bradshaw, Franco Harris, Lynn Swann, John Stallworth, Mel Blount, Jack Lambert, Jack Ham, Mike Webster, Donnie Shell, L. C. Greenwood, Rocky Bleier, Gerry Mullins, Larry Brown, Mike Wagner, J.T. Thomas, Loren Toews, Jon Kolb, Sam Davis, Steve Furness, Dwight White, Randy Grossman and the previously mentioned Joe Greene (who later added two more rings). At least five coaches were with the team all four years: George Perles, Louis Riecke, Woody Widenhofer and (as noted above) Chuck Noll and Dick Hoak. The list of Steelers front office staff receiving four rings during that era includes Director of Player Personnel Dick Haley.
  - Tom Flores: First person to have rings as a player (Kansas City Chiefs), assistant coach and head coach (Oakland Raiders)
  - Joe Montana, Keena Turner, Jesse Sapolu, Eric Wright, Mike Wilson and Ronnie Lott each won four Super Bowl rings with the 49ers. Dwaine Board was a member of four San Francisco 49ers' Super Bowl winning teams; Super Bowl XVI, Super Bowl XIX and Super Bowl XXIII as a player, and Super Bowl XXIX as a coach.
  - Kicker Adam Vinatieri won three with the New England Patriots and one with the Indianapolis Colts
  - Russ Grimm won three with Washington Redskins and one as a coach with Pittsburgh Steelers
  - Ted Hendricks won one with Baltimore Colts and three with Oakland Raiders
  - Bill Romanowski won two with San Francisco and two with Denver Broncos
  - Coach Charlie Weis won one with New York Giants and three with New England Patriots
  - Matt Millen has four rings while playing for four cities and three teams, one with Oakland Raiders, one with Los Angeles Raiders, one with San Francisco 49ers, and one with Washington Redskins (only player to earn a ring with four cities)
  - Sherman Lewis won three as running backs coach with San Francisco 49ers and one as offensive coordinator with Green Bay Packers
  - Willie Davis Won all four rings with Green Bay Packers: two as a player, one as a member of the team's board of directors, and one as an emeritus director. He is the only person to possess all four of Green Bay's Super Bowl rings. Davis also won rings as a member of the 1961, 1962 and 1965 NFL Championship Green Bay Packer teams, bringing his total championship ring count to seven, with the first three having been awarded prior to the creation of the Super Bowl.
  - Mike Pope won all four of his Super Bowl rings as the long time Tight End coach for New York Giants
  - Ken Norton Jr. was the first member of 3 Super Bowl-winning teams in a row as a player, and gained a 4th ring as the Linebacker coach for the 2013 Seattle Seahawks
  - Larry Izzo won three Super Bowls with New England Patriots, and one as the special teams assistant coach with New York Giants
  - Coach Gary Kubiak won one with San Francisco 49ers as quarterbacks coach, two with Denver Broncos as offensive coordinator, and one as the head coach of the Broncos
  - Brian Pariani has won four rings. One as an offensive assistant coach with San Francisco 49ers and three as the tight ends coach with the Denver Broncos
  - Rob Gronkowski won three Super Bowls with the New England Patriots during the 2010s, and his fourth was with the Tampa Bay Buccaneers. Notably, all four came when he partnered with Tom Brady.
  - Lionel Vital won one as a (strike replacement) player with the Washington Redskins in 1987 and three with the New England Patriots in 2001–2004.
  - Tom Moore won two Super Bowls with the Pittsburgh Steelers in the 1970s as a wide receivers coach, one as the offensive coordinator with the Indianapolis Colts and one as an offensive consultant with the Tampa Bay Buccaneers.
  - Monti Ossenfort won four Super Bowls with the New England Patriots: his first as a scouting assistant, and the remaining three as Director of College Scouting.
  - Andy Reid won one Super Bowl with the Green Bay Packers as assistant offensive line & tight ends coach and three Super Bowls with the Kansas City Chiefs as head coach.
  - Steve Spagnuolo won one Super Bowl with the New York Giants and three Super Bowls with the Kansas City Chiefs as defensive coordinator.
  - Joe Thuney won two Super Bowls with the New England Patriots and Kansas City Chiefs.
  - Tim Terry won one Super Bowl with the Green Bay Packers as Assistant director of player personnel and three Super Bowls with the Kansas City Chiefs as Director of pro personnel.

== Gallery ==
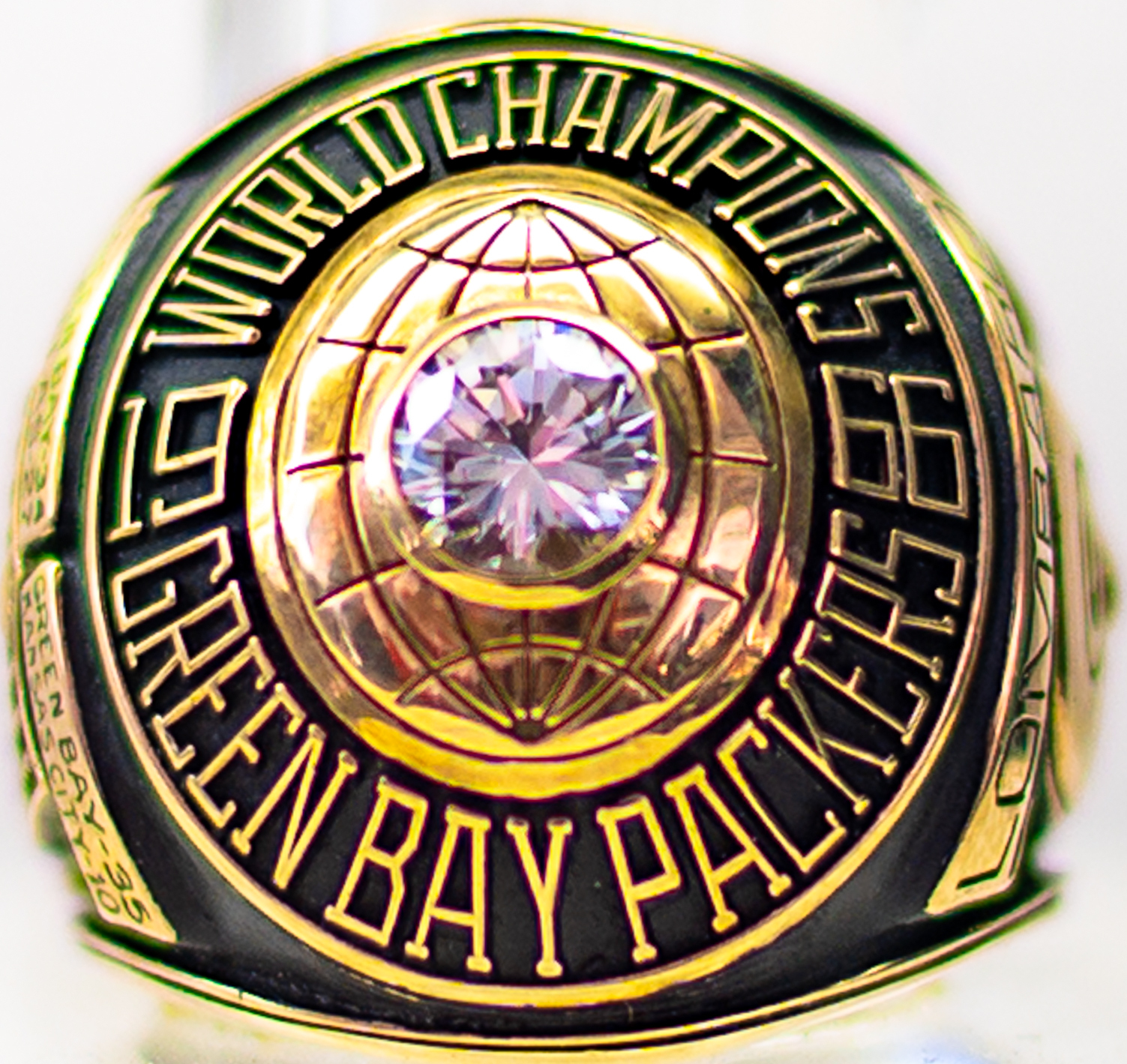
Super Bowl I
(Green Bay Packers)

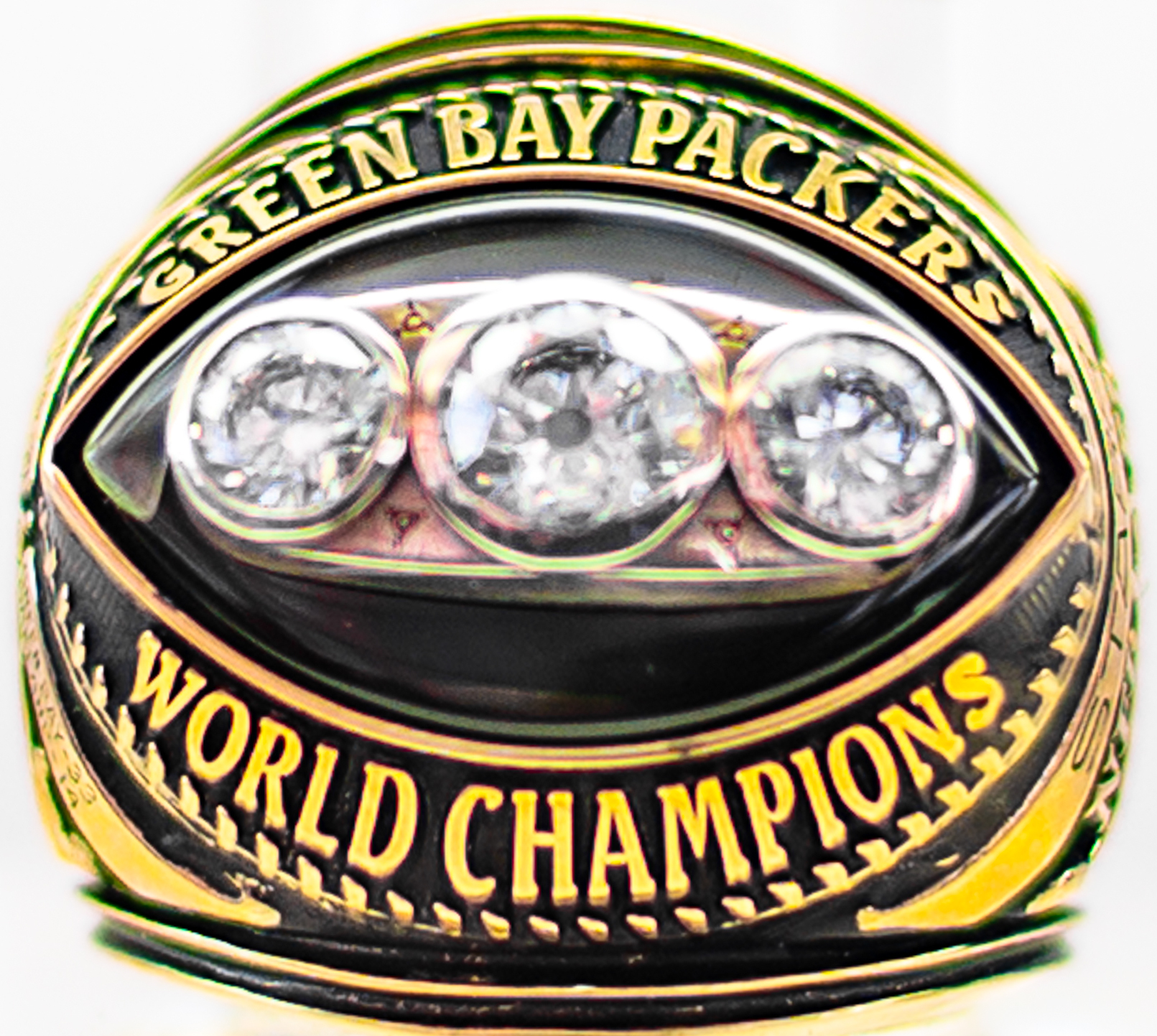
Super Bowl II
(Green Bay Packers)

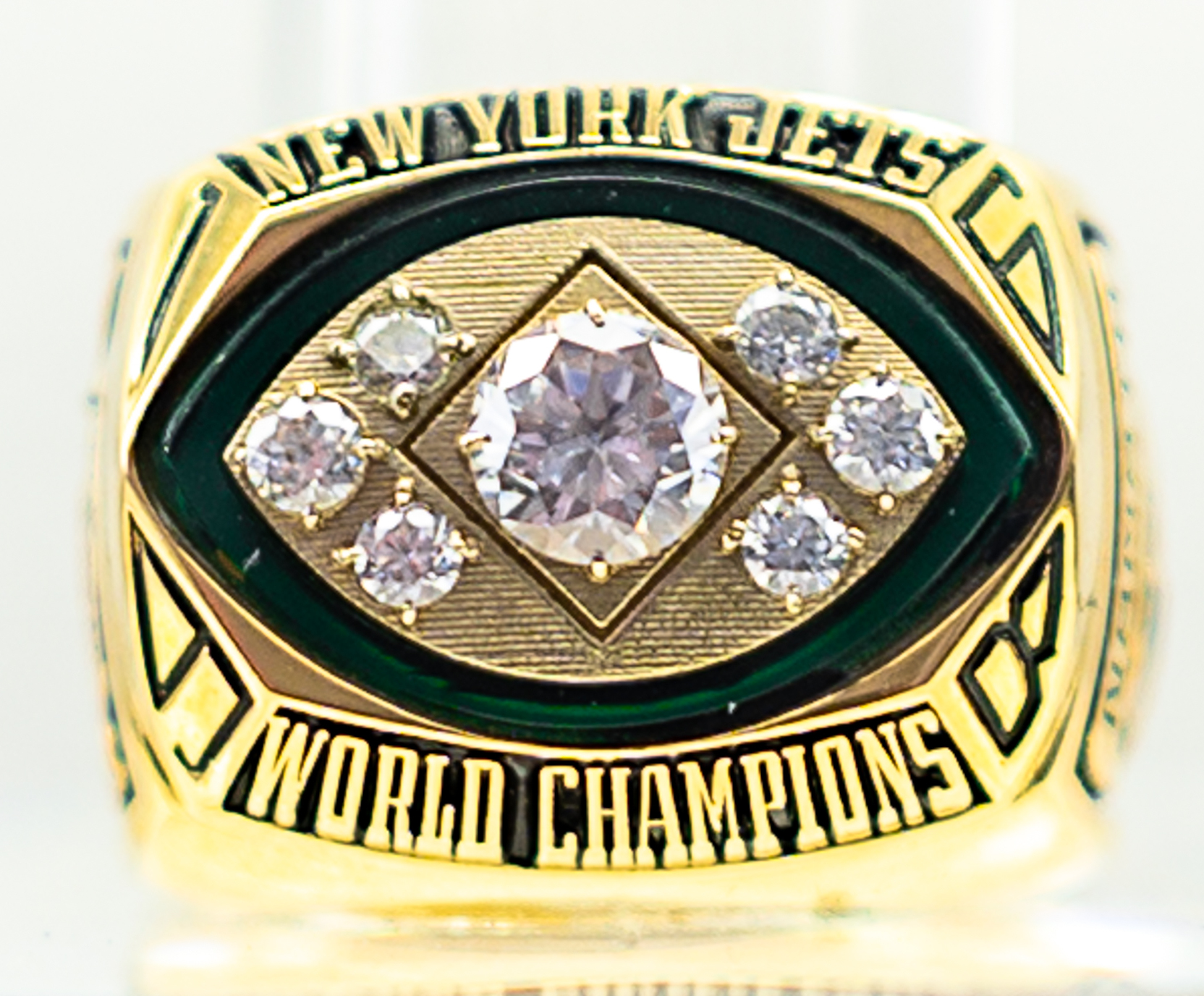
Super Bowl III
(New York Jets)

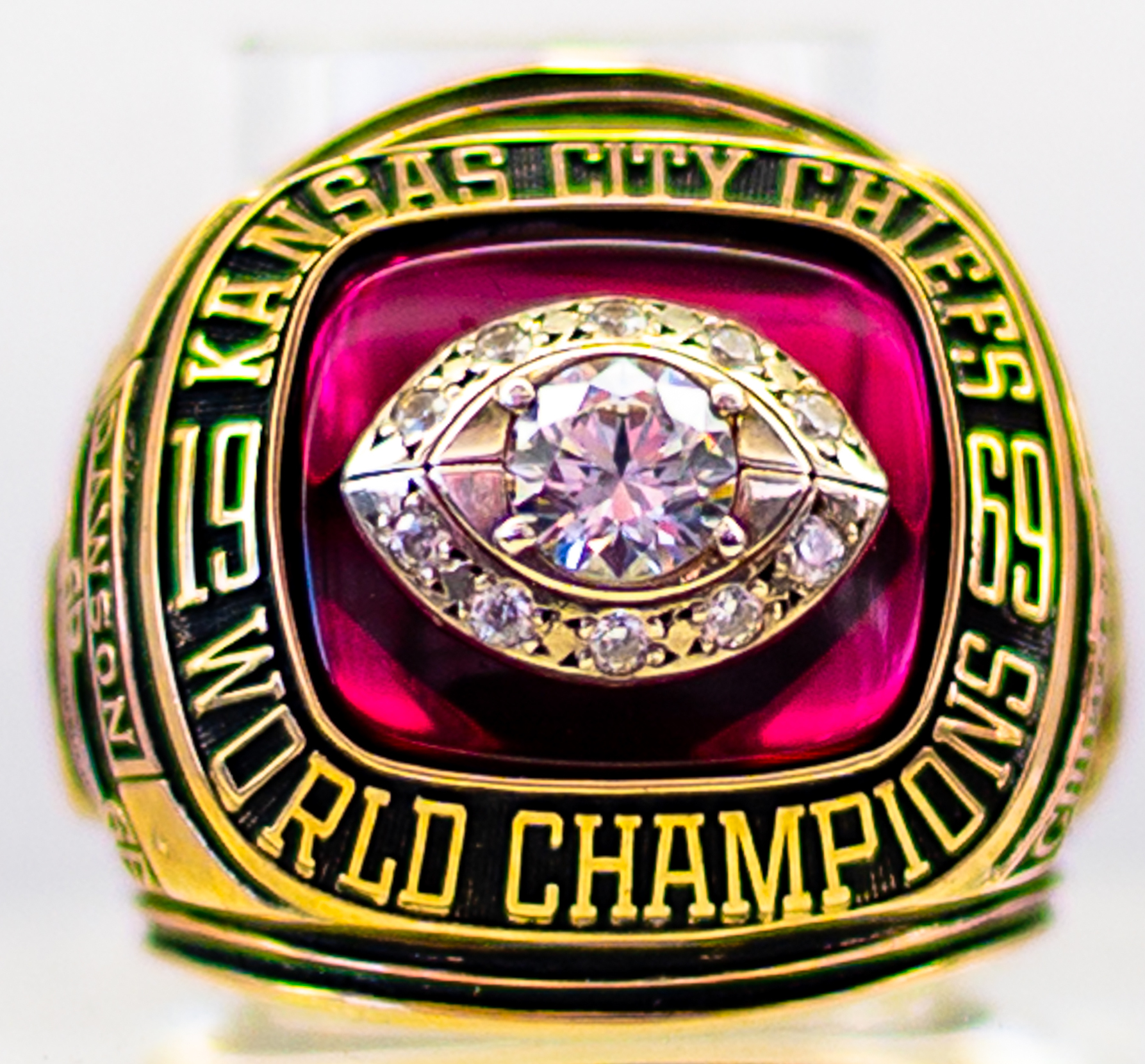
Super Bowl IV
(Kansas City Chiefs)

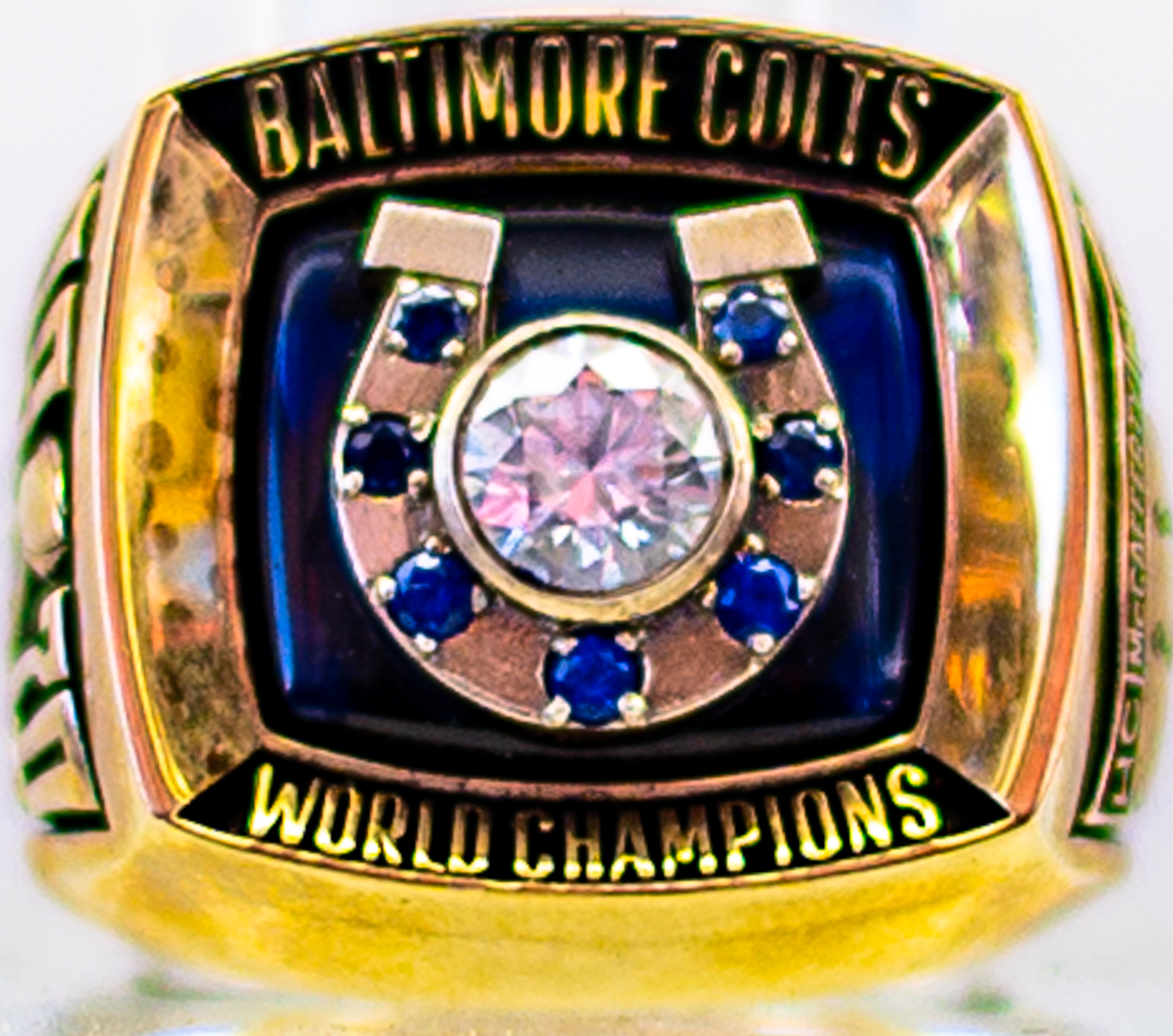
Super Bowl V
(Baltimore Colts)

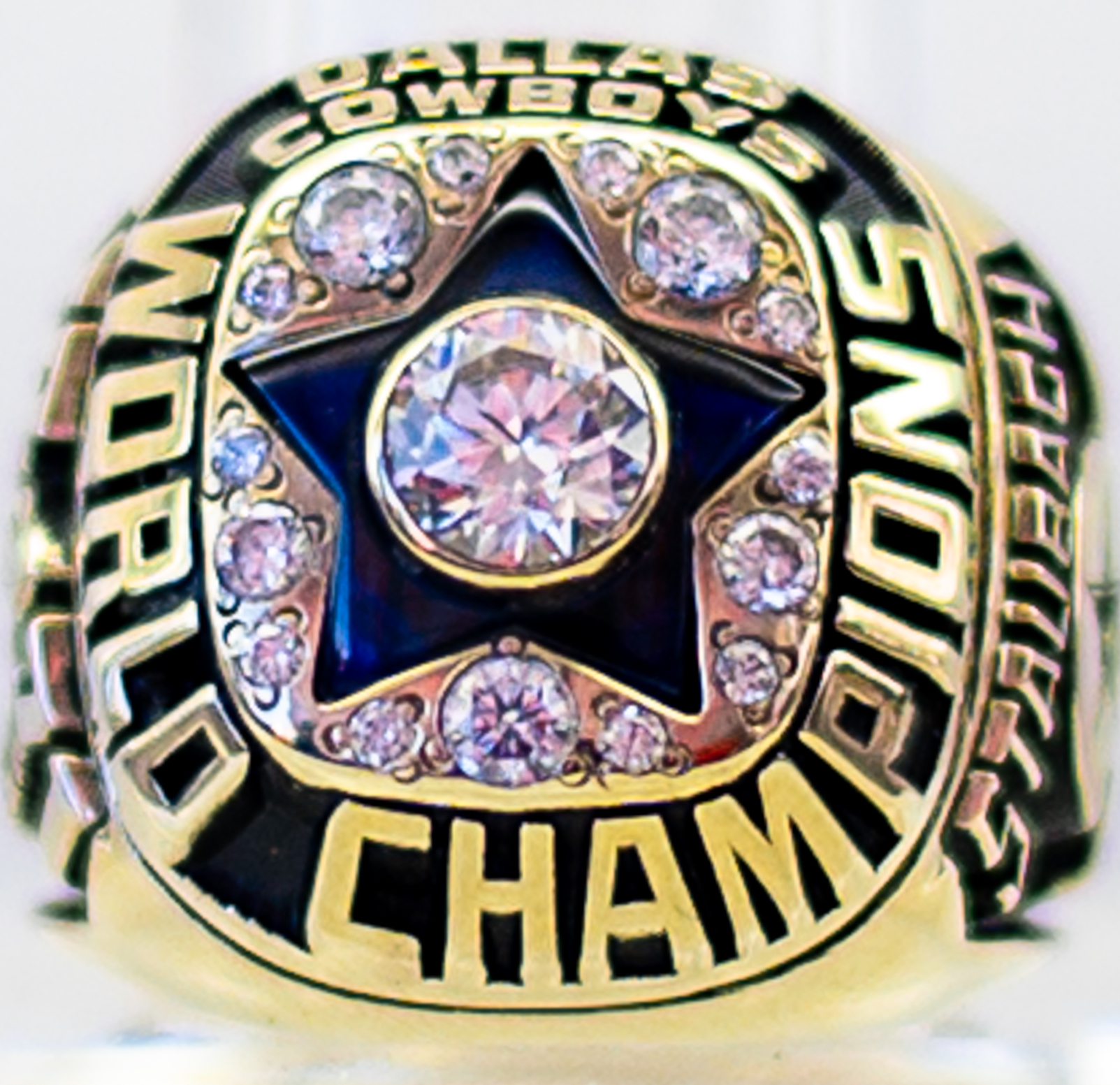
Super Bowl VI
(Dallas Cowboys)

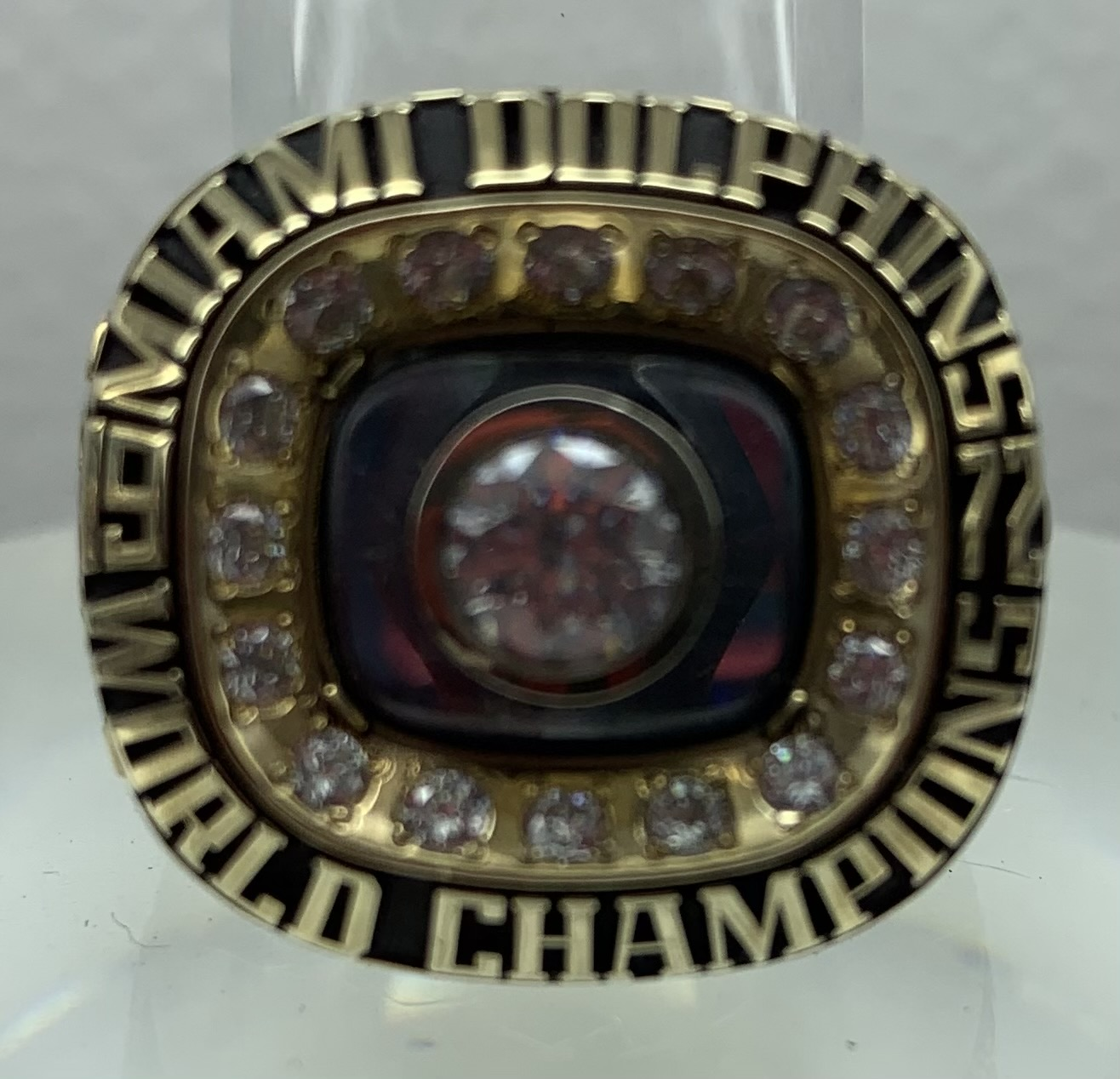
Super Bowl VII
(Miami Dolphins)

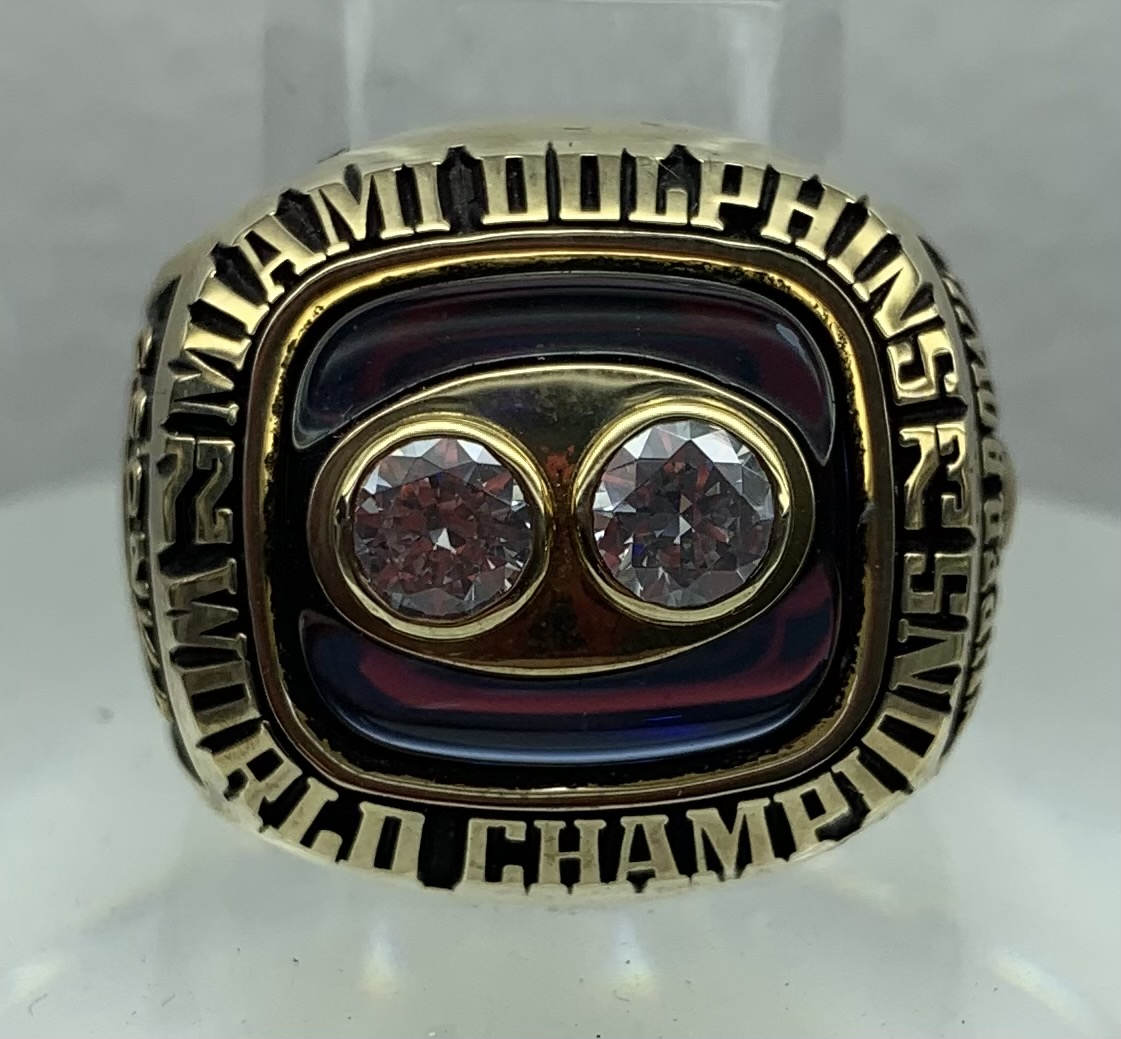
Super Bowl VIII
(Miami Dolphins)

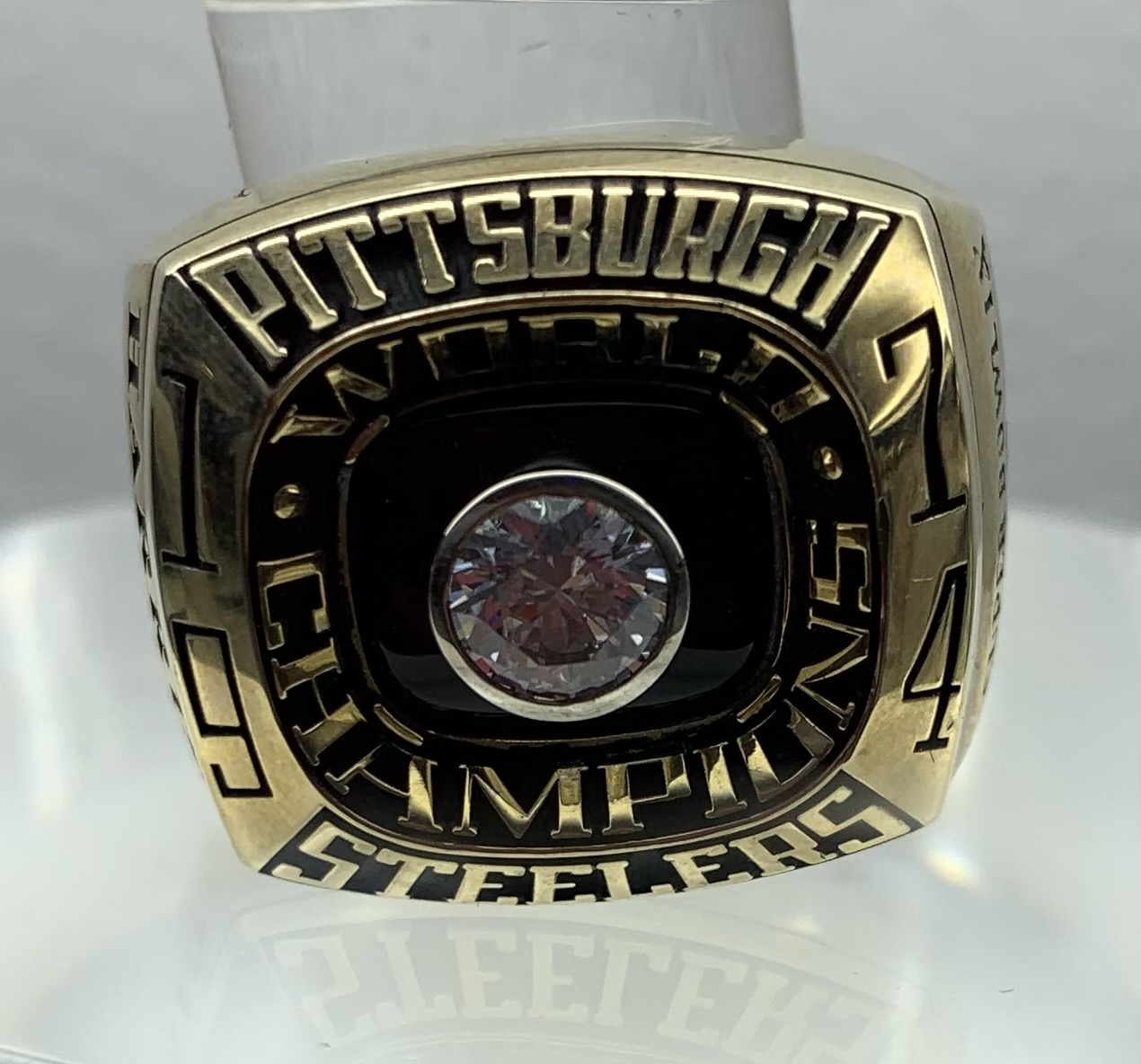
Super Bowl IX
(Pittsburgh Steelers)

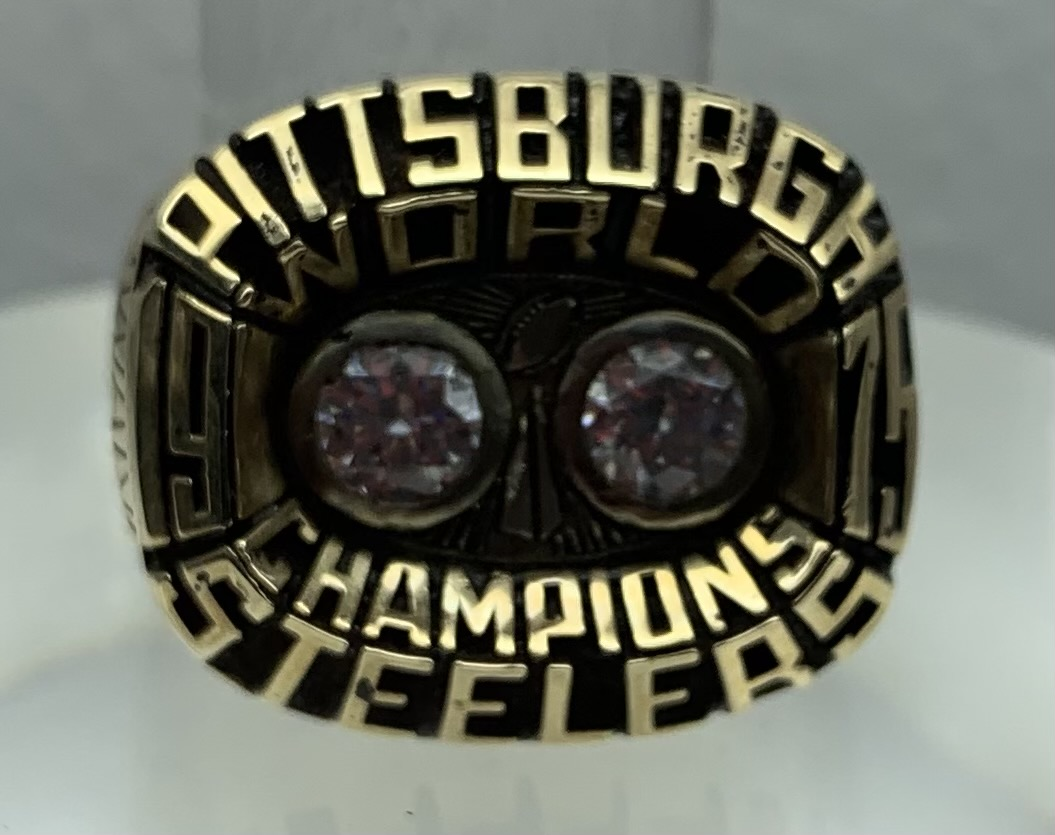
Super Bowl X
(Pittsburgh Steelers)

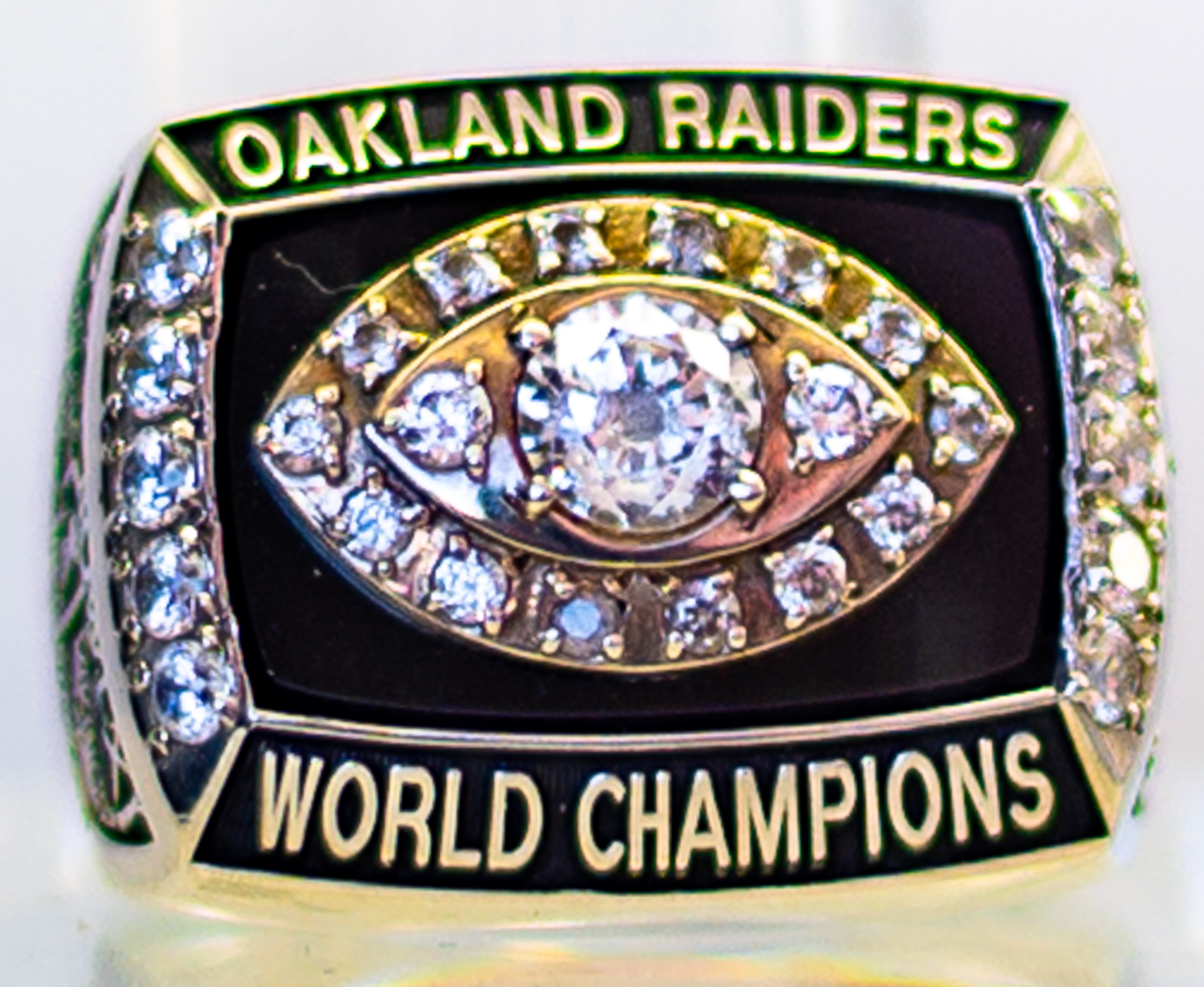
Super Bowl XI
(Oakland Raiders)

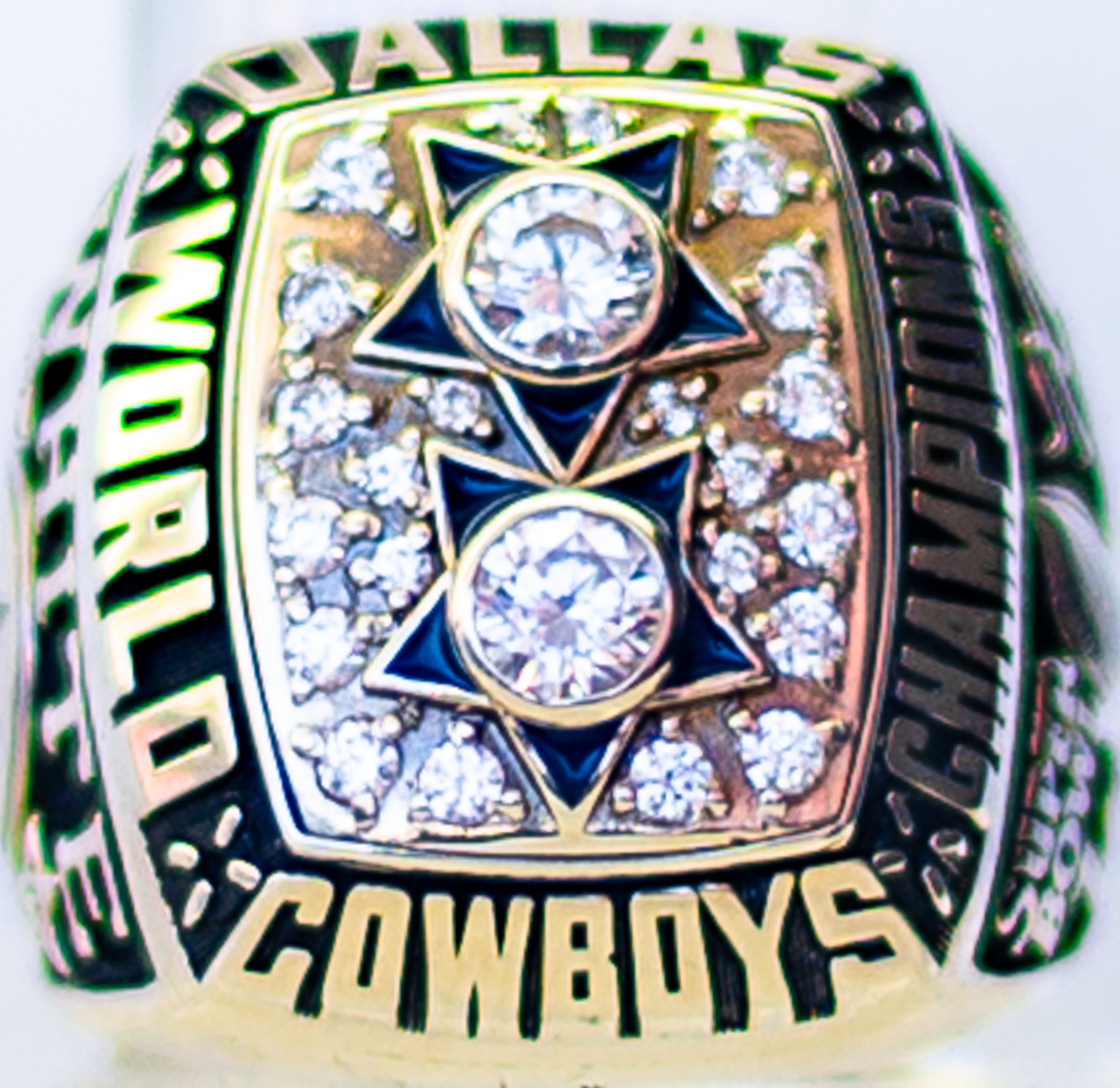
Super Bowl XII
(Dallas Cowboys)

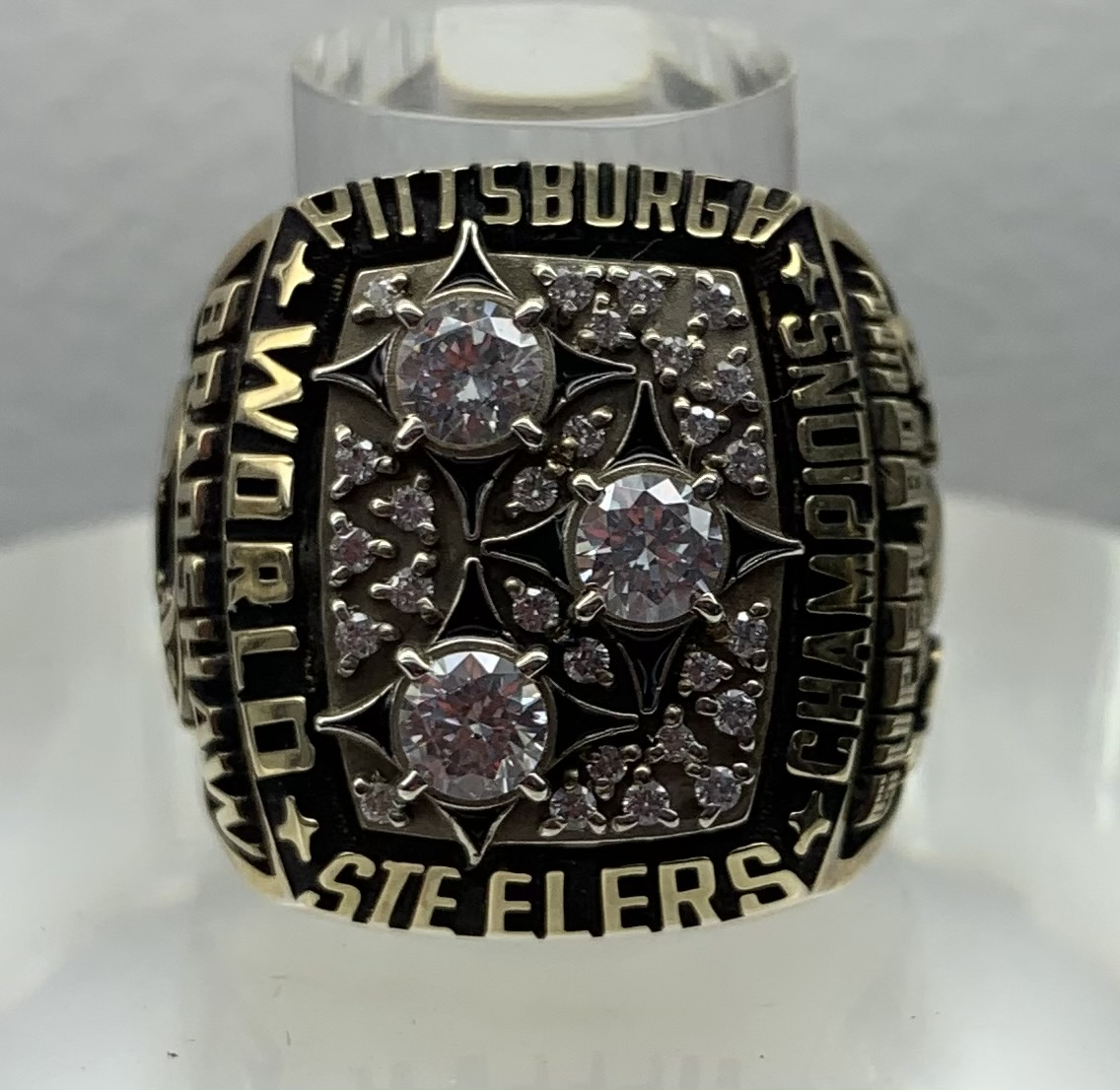
Super Bowl XIII
(Pittsburgh Steelers)

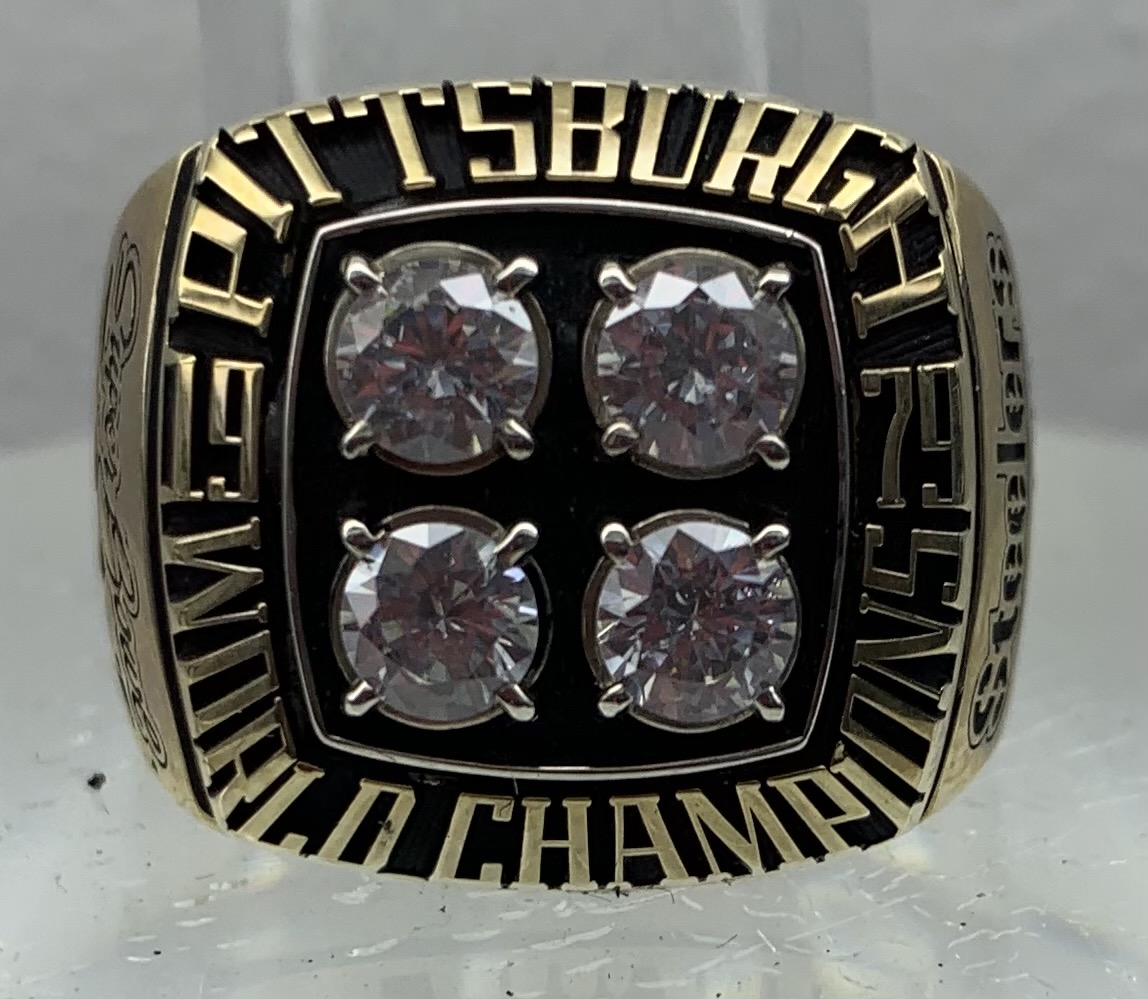
Super Bowl XIV
(Pittsburgh Steelers)

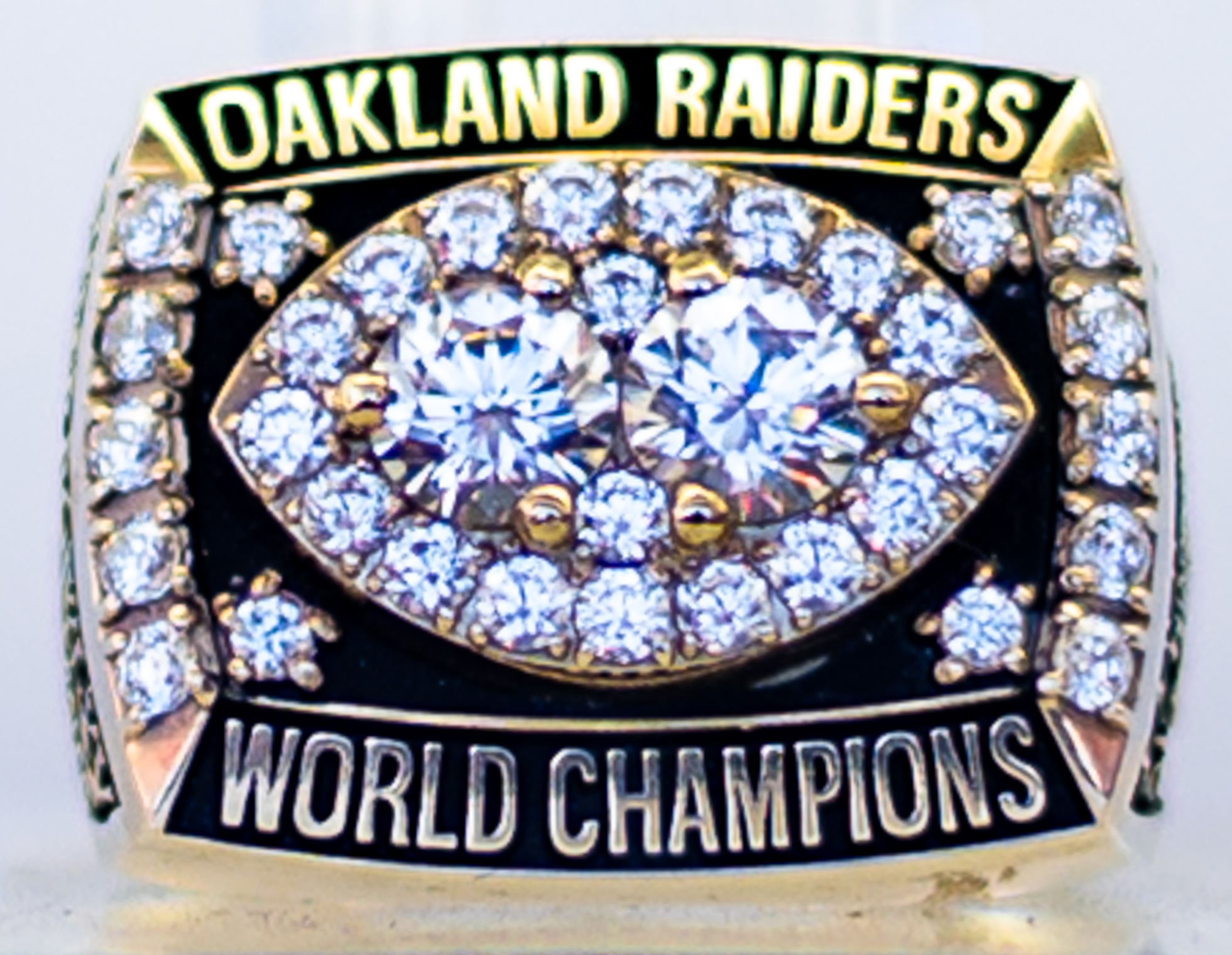
Super Bowl XV
(Oakland Raiders)

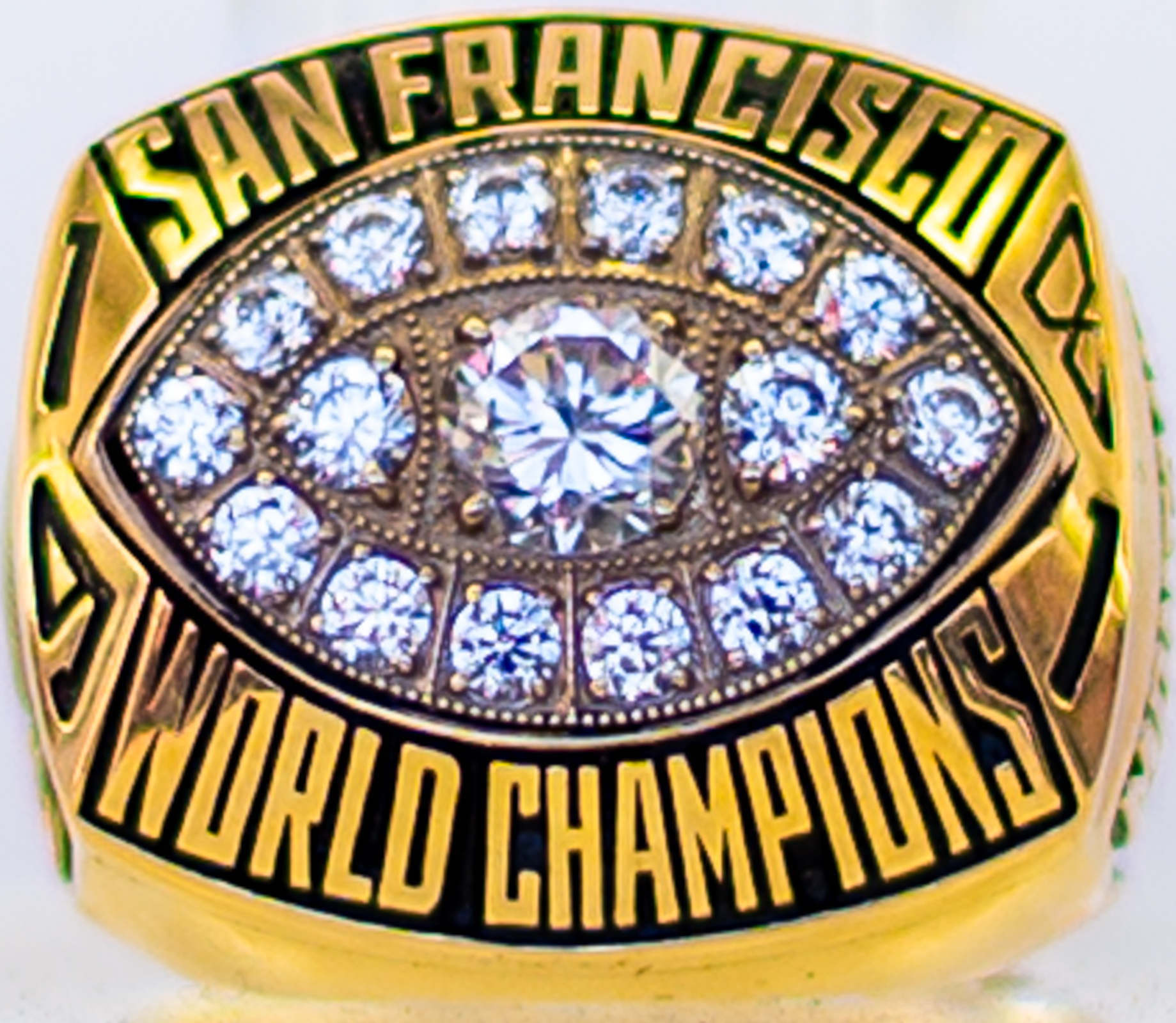
Super Bowl XVI
(San Francisco 49ers)

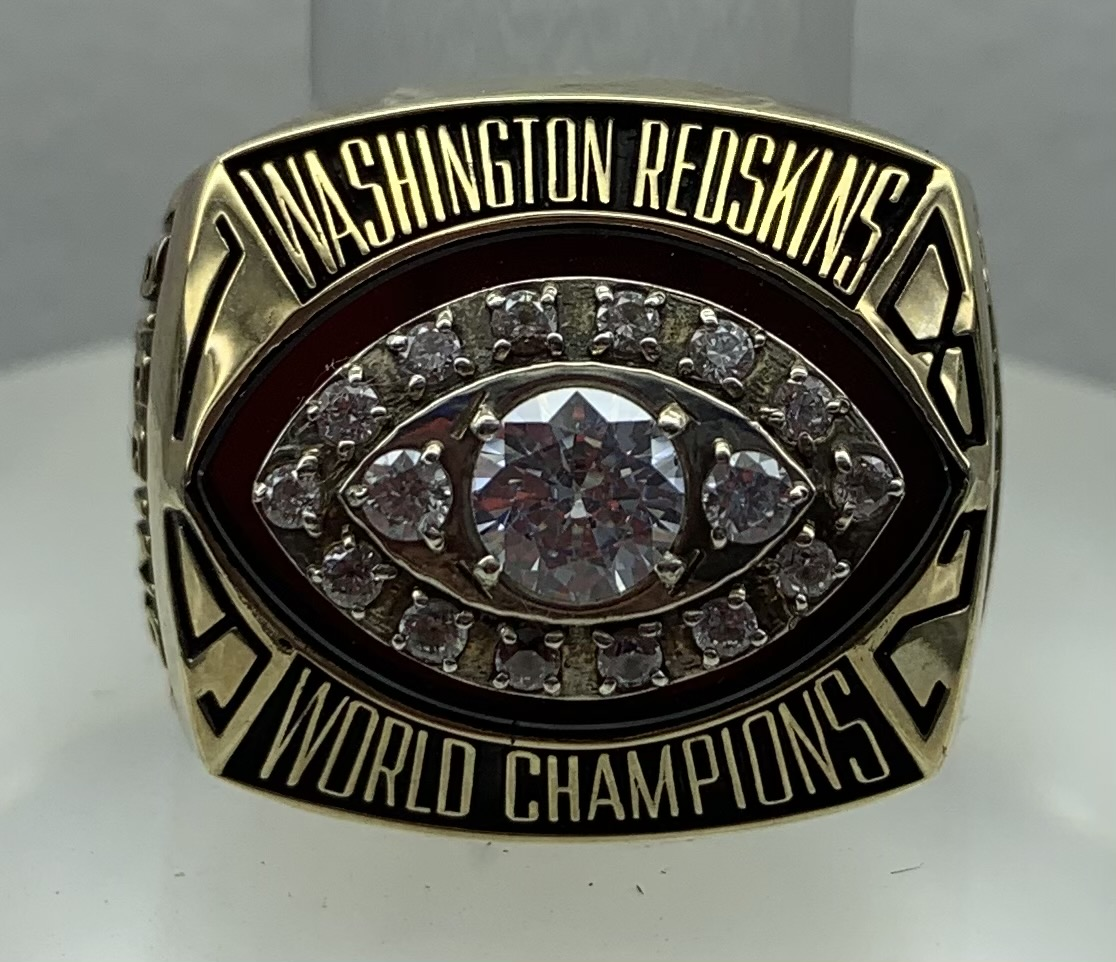
Super Bowl XVII
(Washington Redskins)

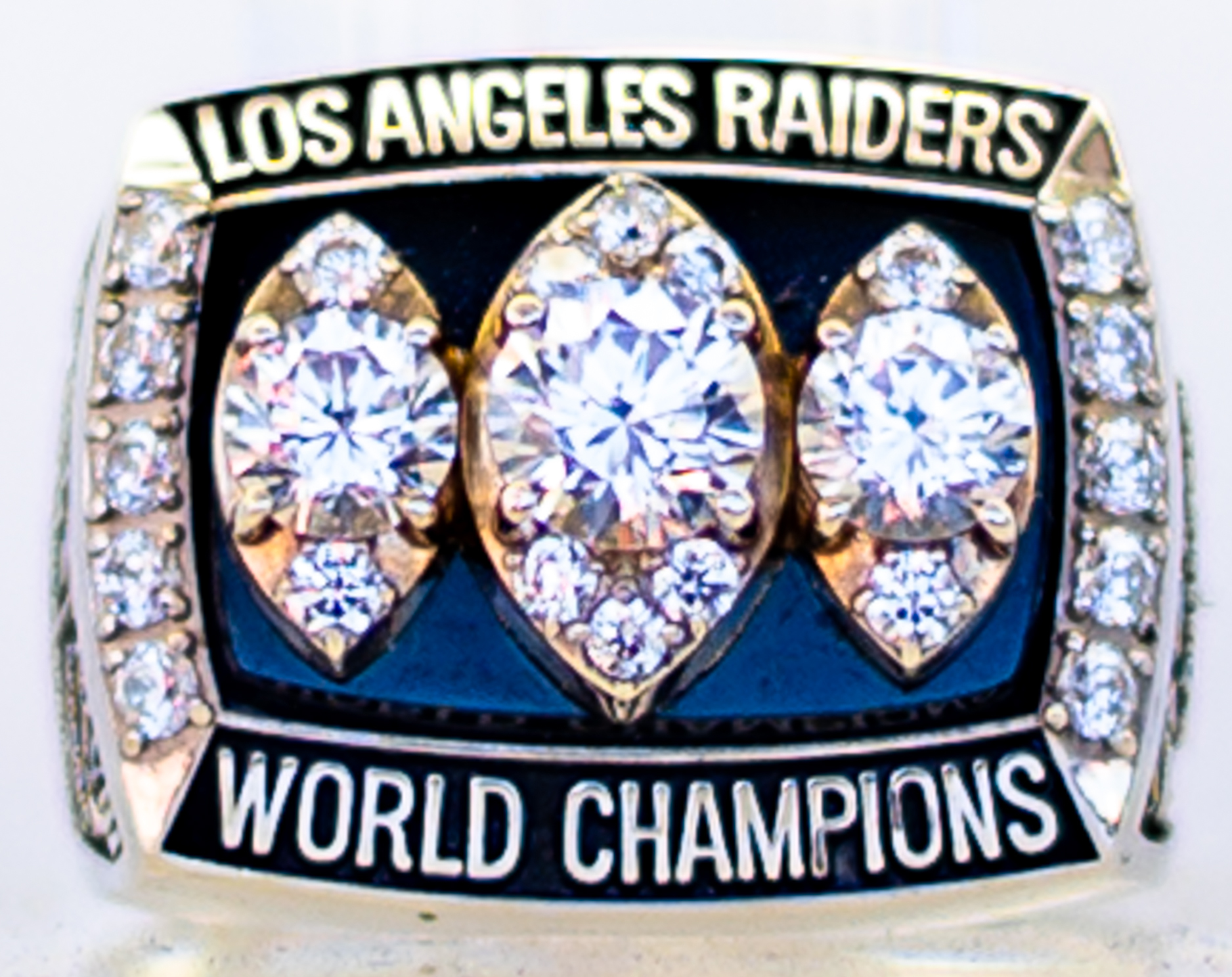
Super Bowl XVIII
(Los Angeles Raiders)

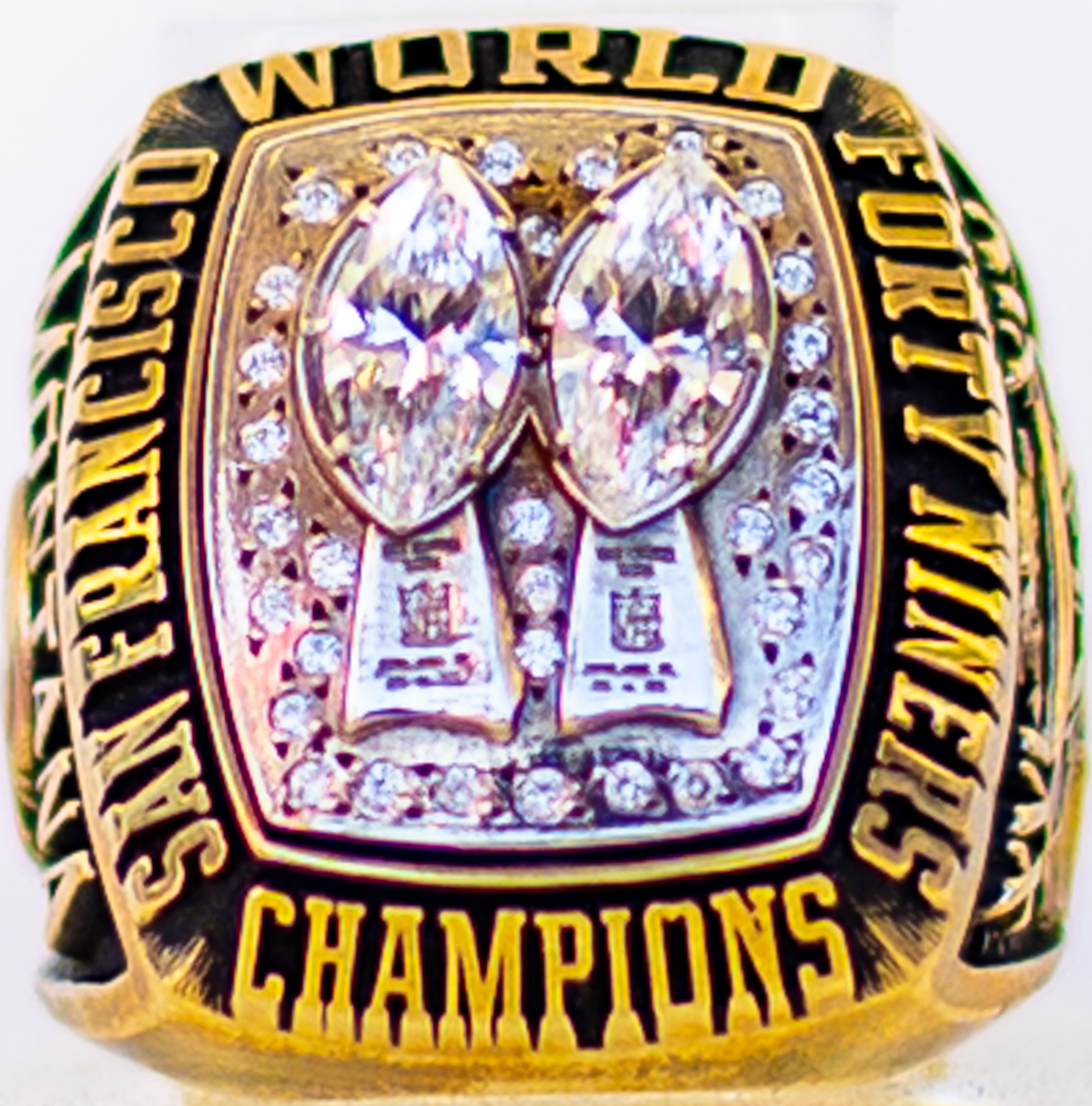
Super Bowl XIX
(San Francisco 49ers)

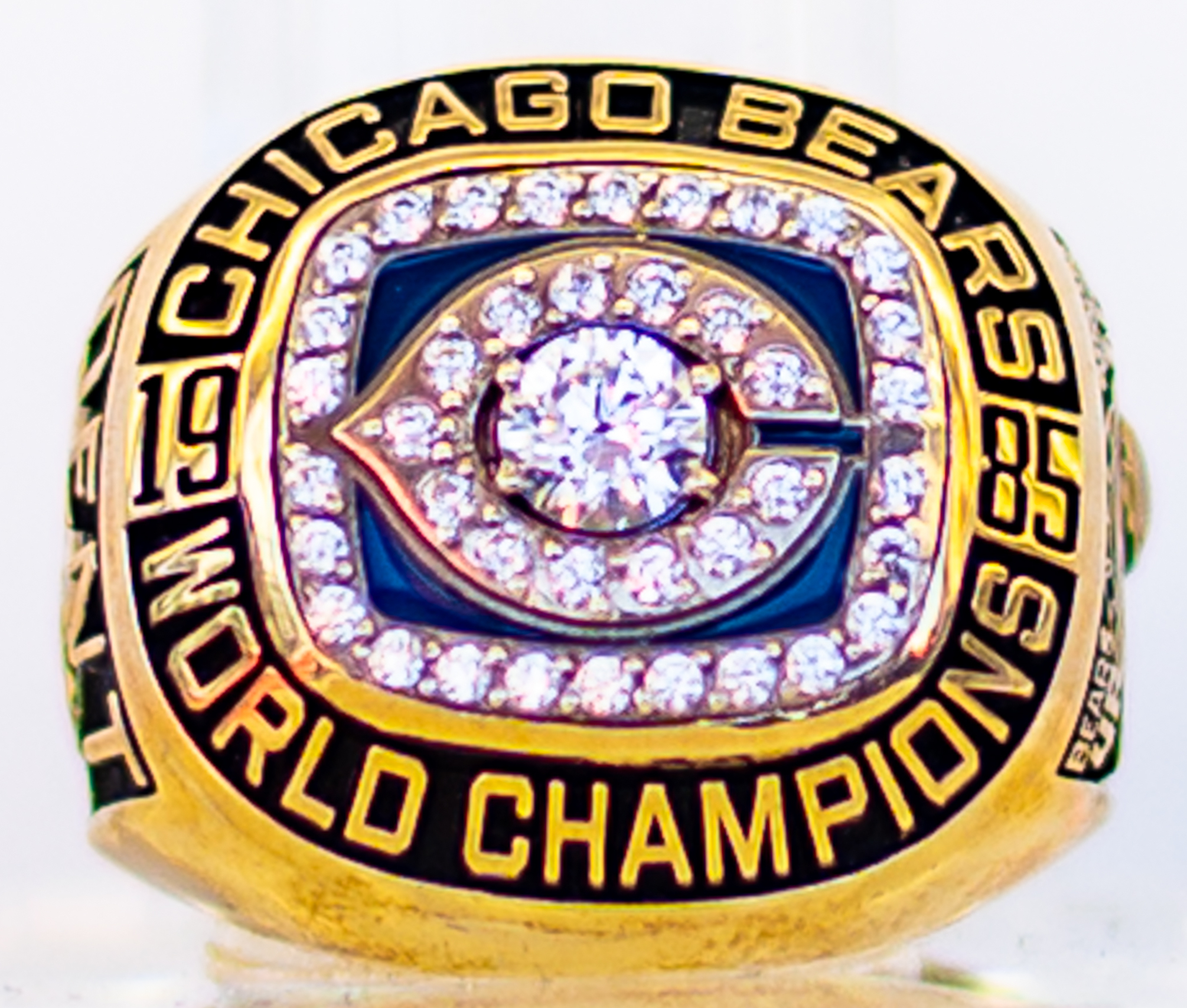
Super Bowl XX
(Chicago Bears)

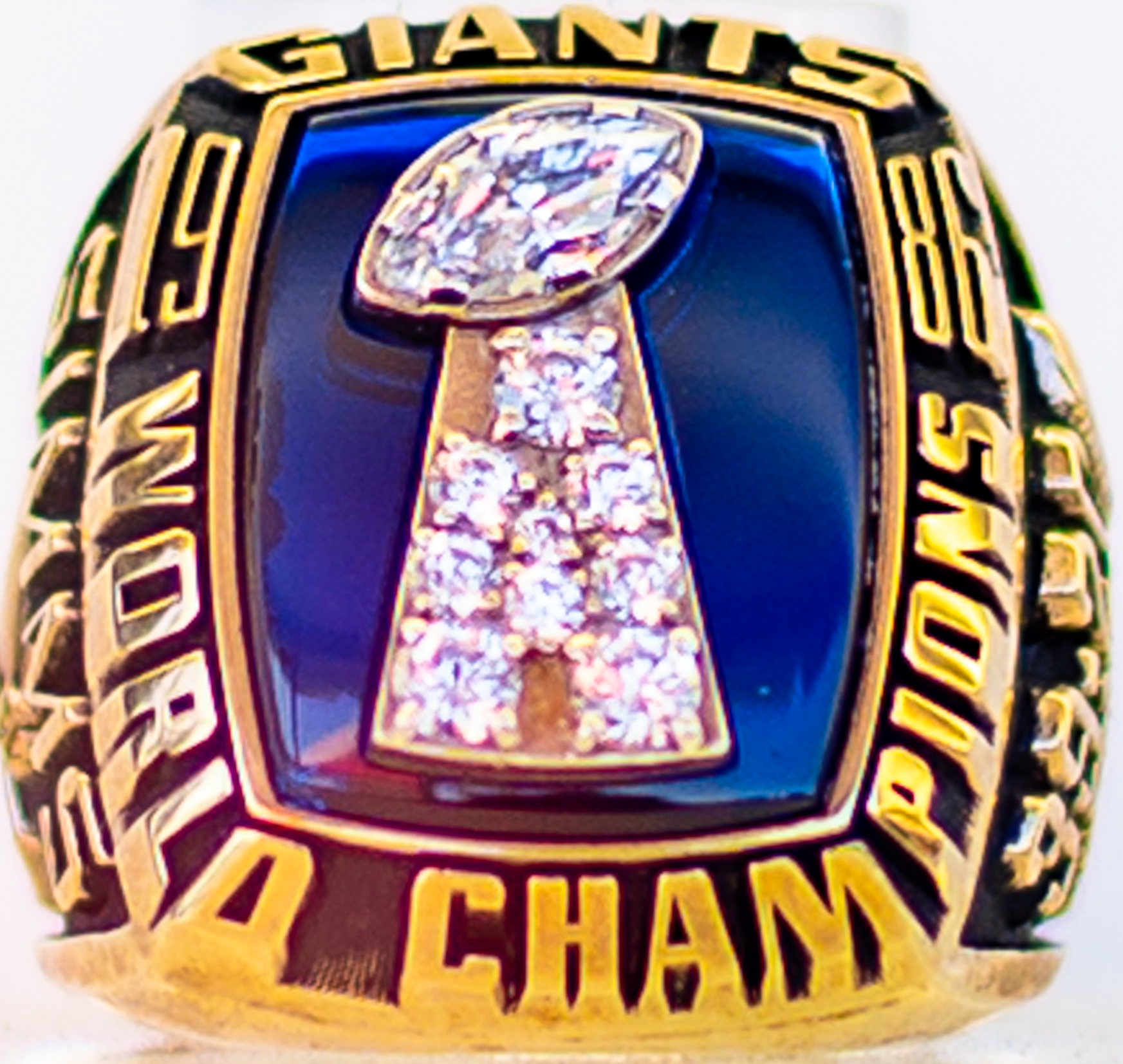
Super Bowl XXI
(New York Giants)

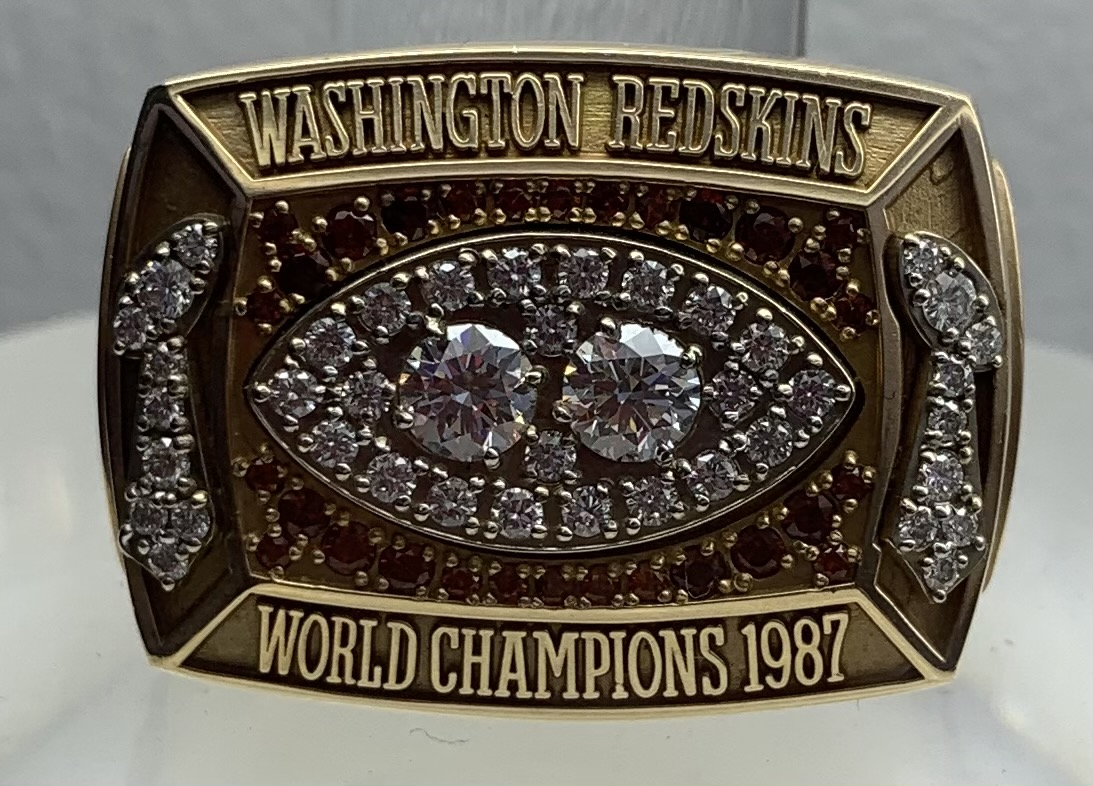
Super Bowl XXII
(Washington Redskins)

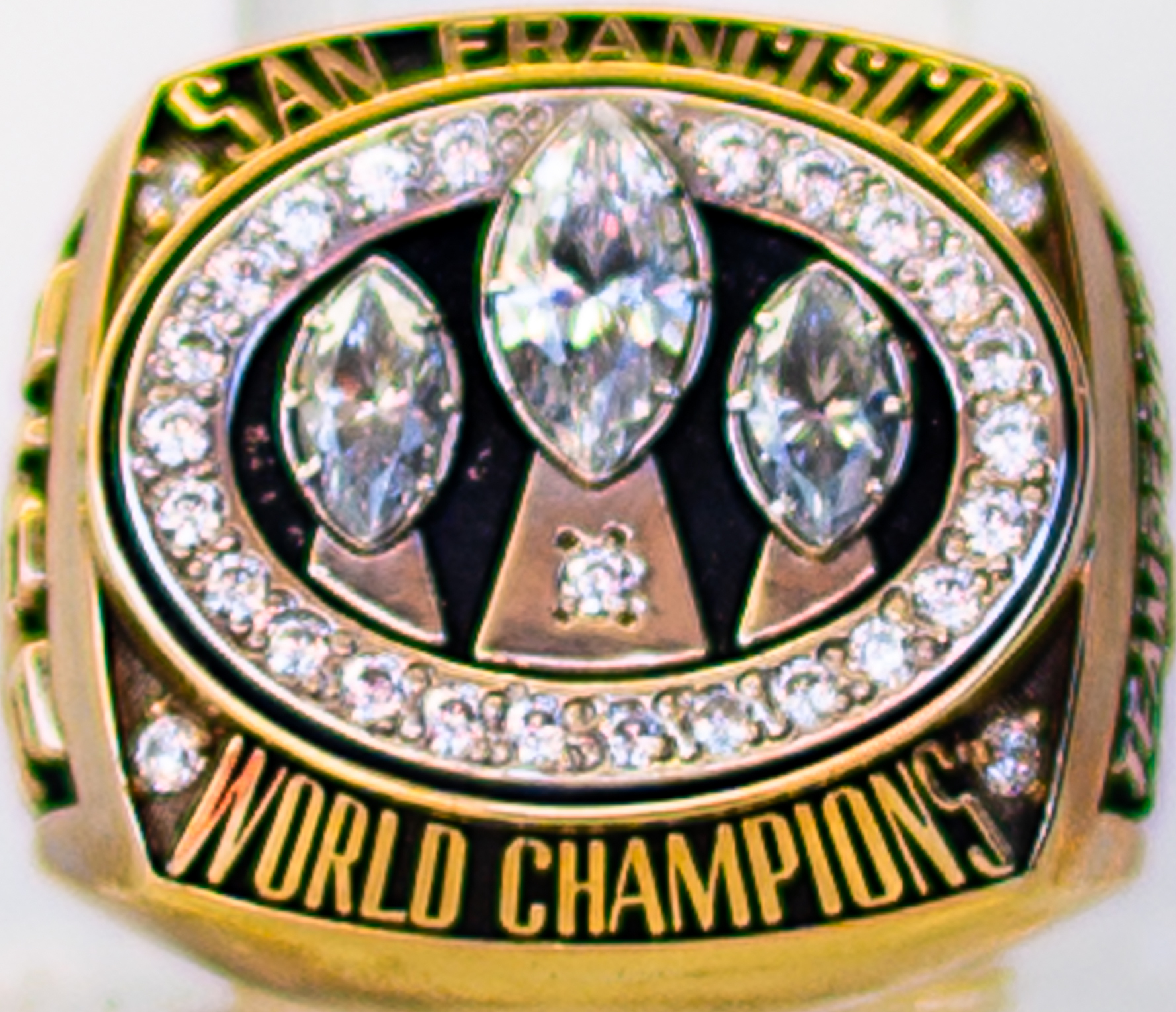
Super Bowl XXIII
(San Francisco 49ers)

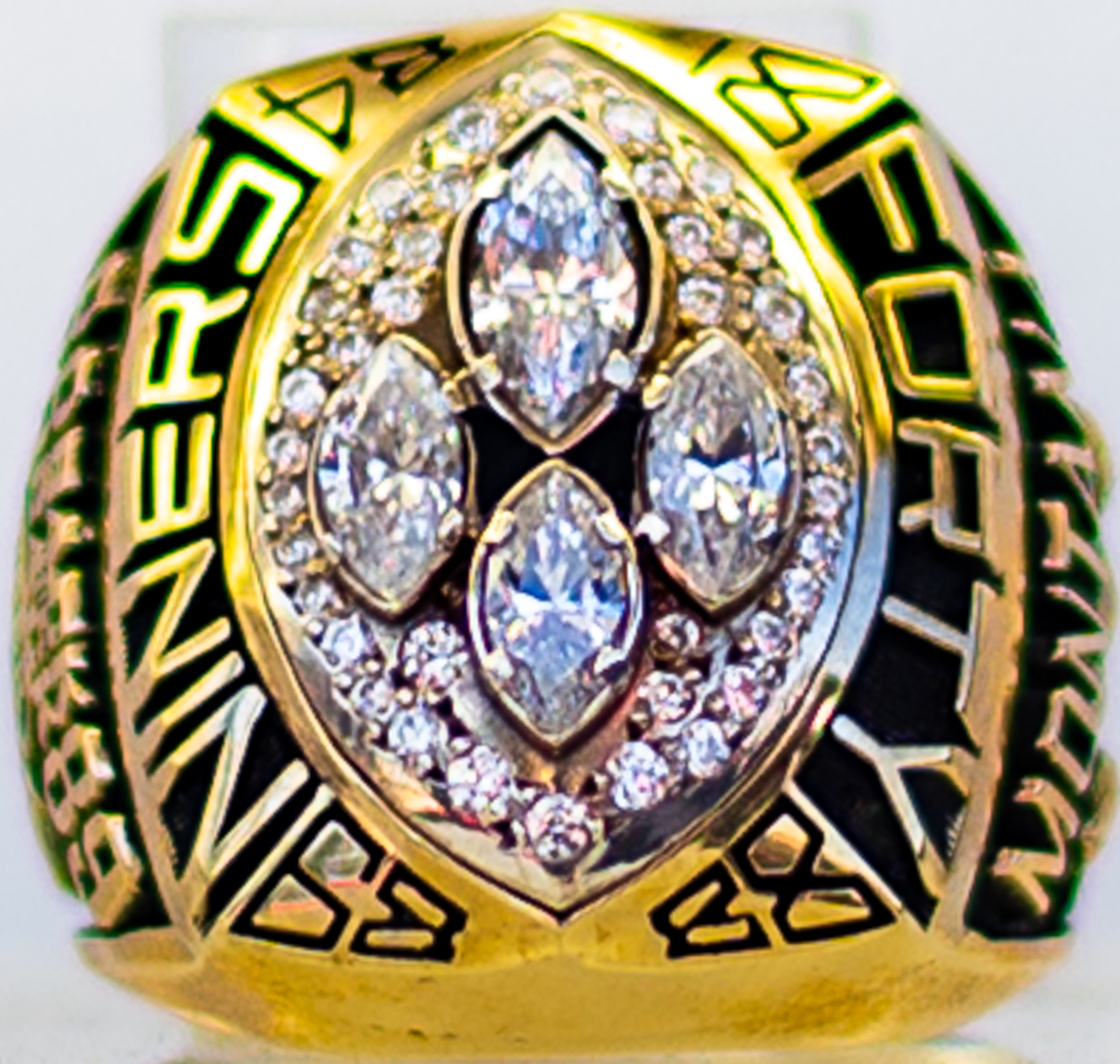
Super Bowl XXIV
(San Francisco 49ers)

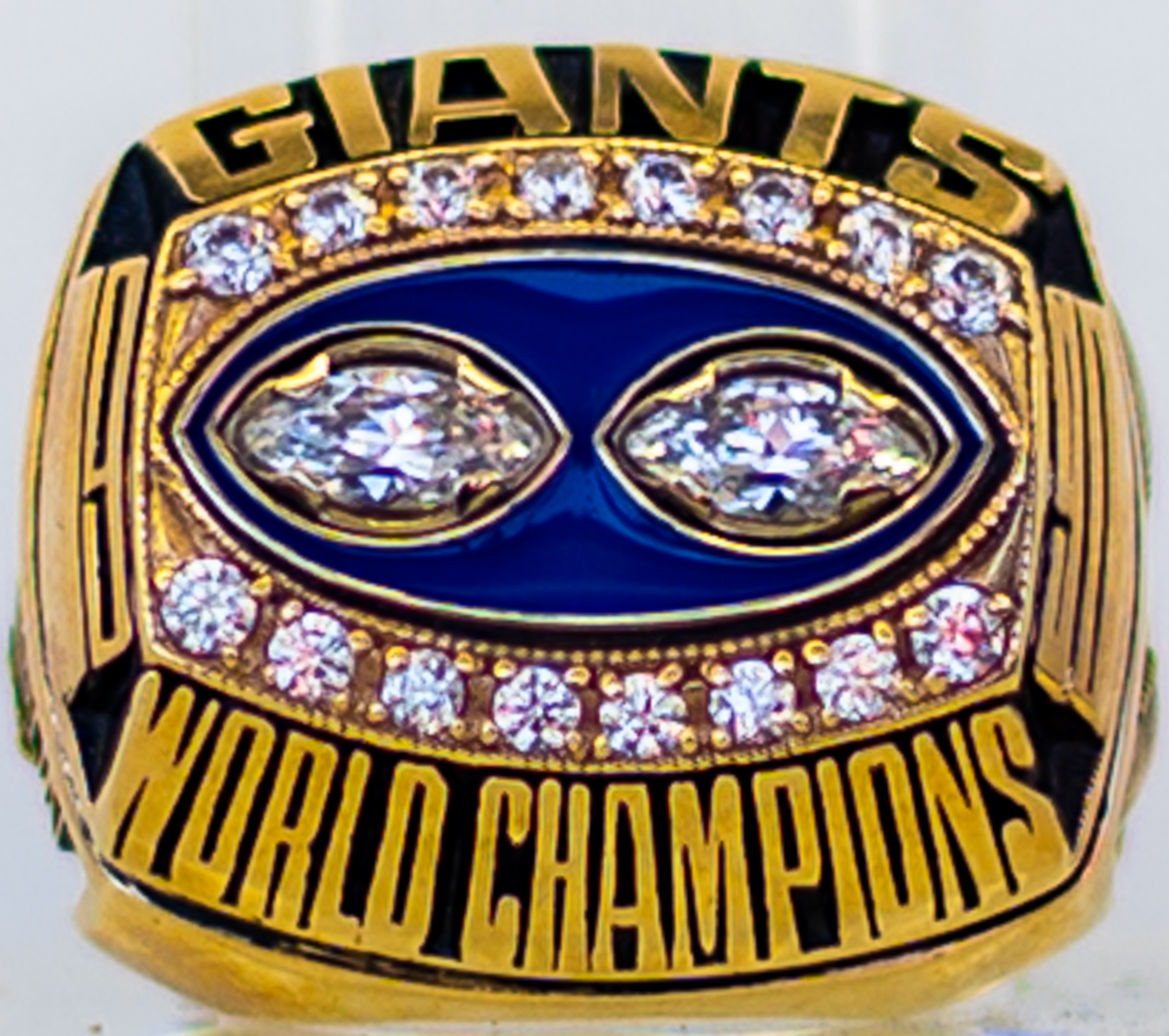
Super Bowl XXV
(New York Giants)

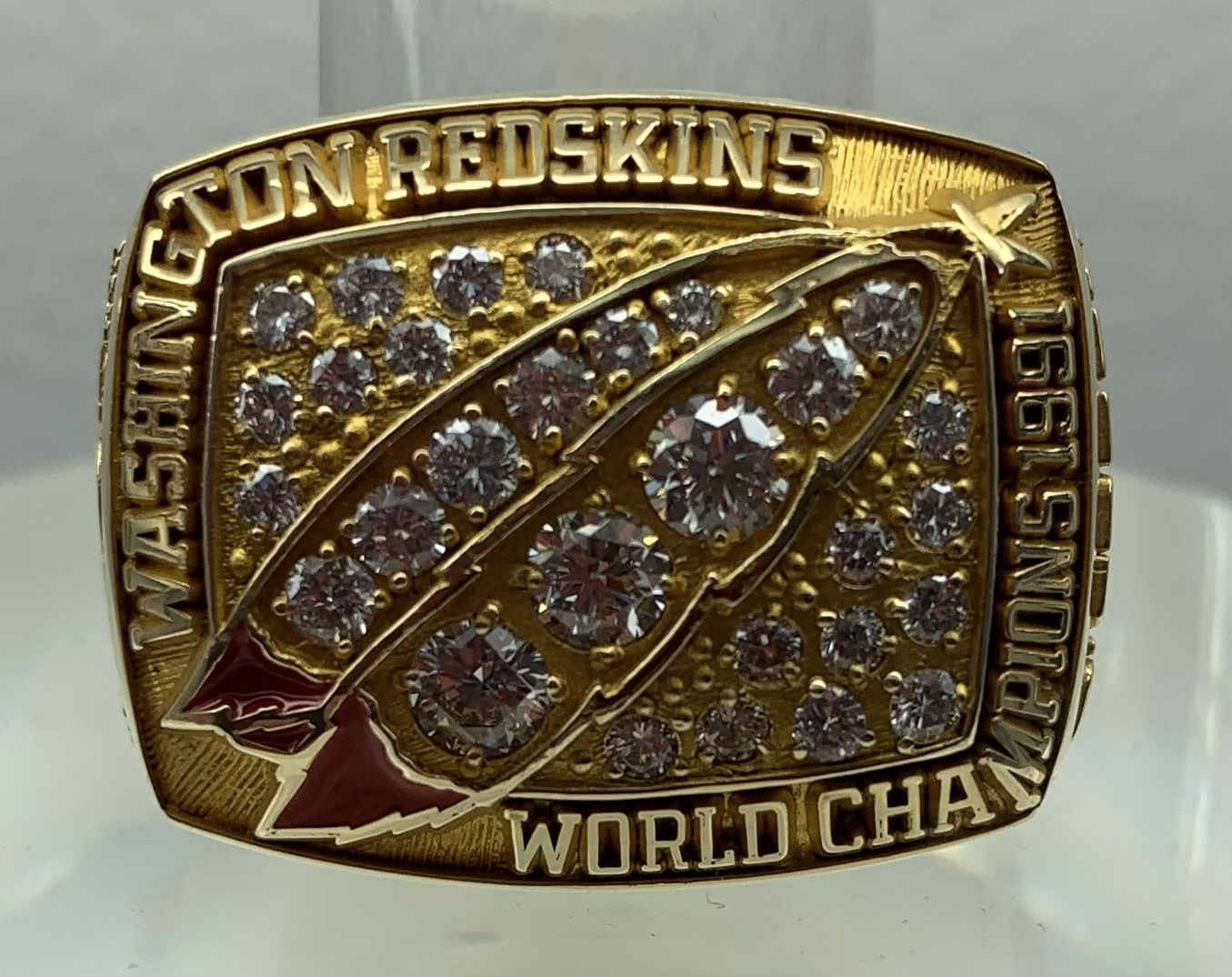
Super Bowl XXVI
(Washington Redskins)

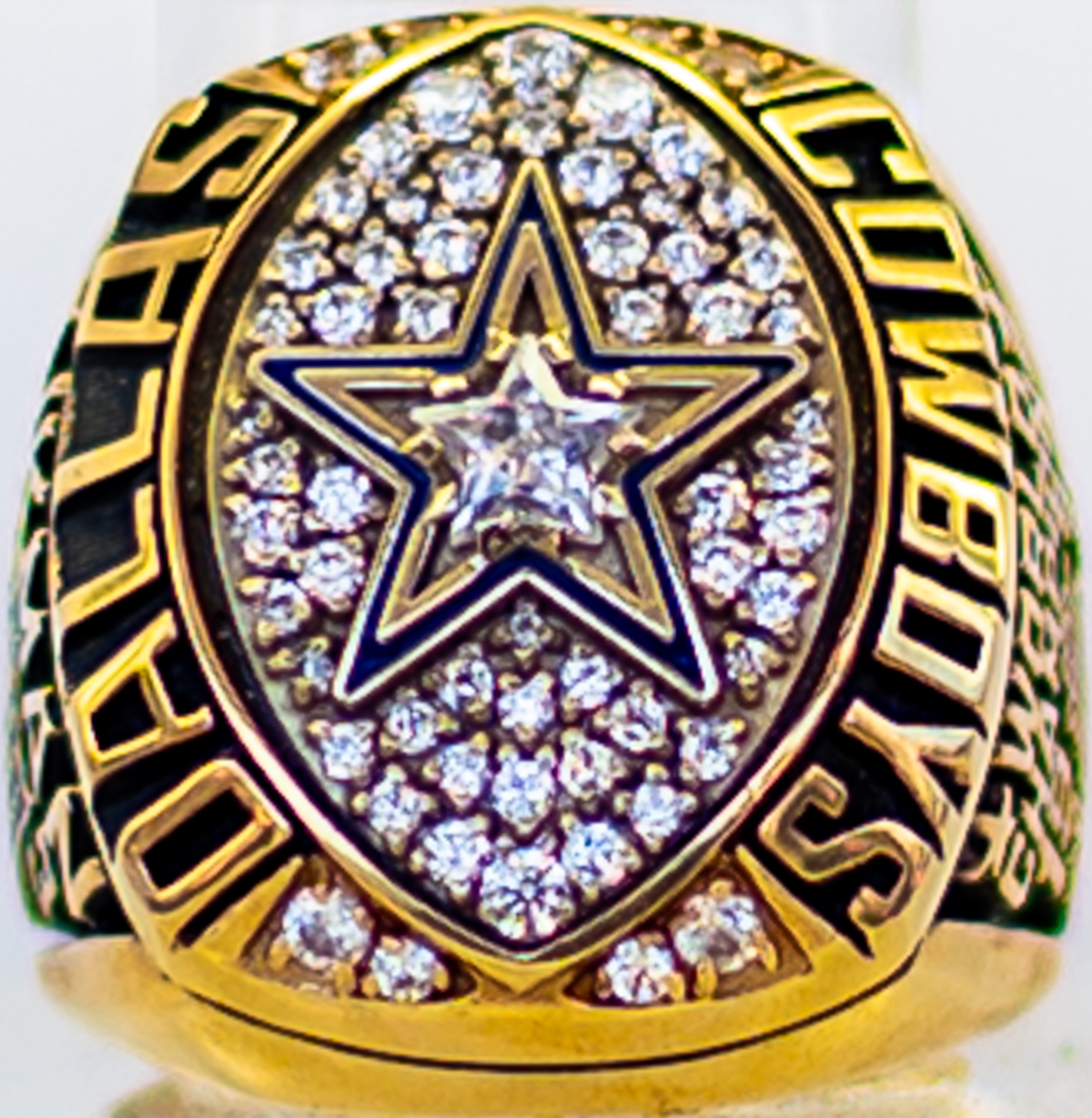
Super Bowl XXVII
(Dallas Cowboys)

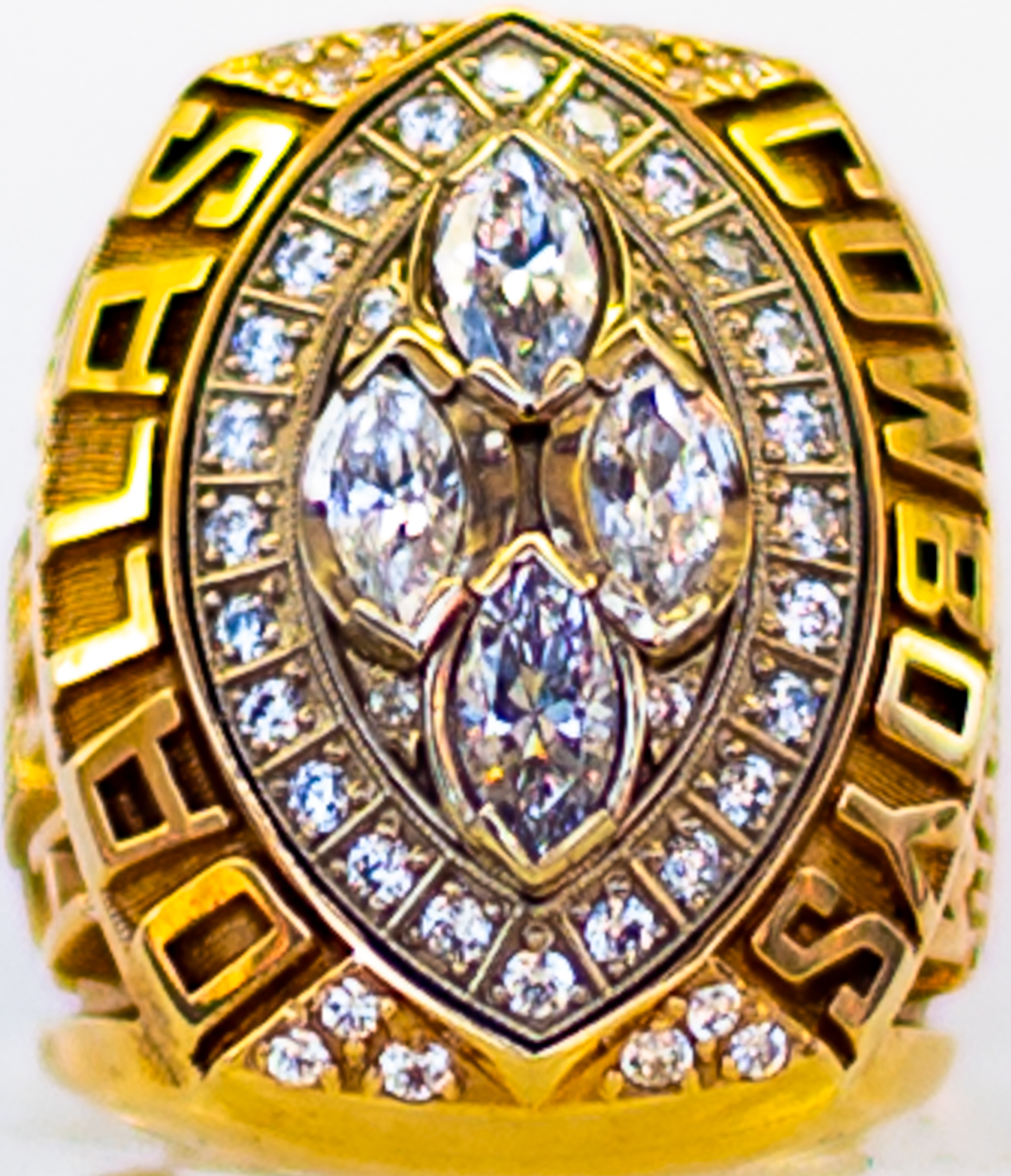
Super Bowl XXVIII
(Dallas Cowboys)

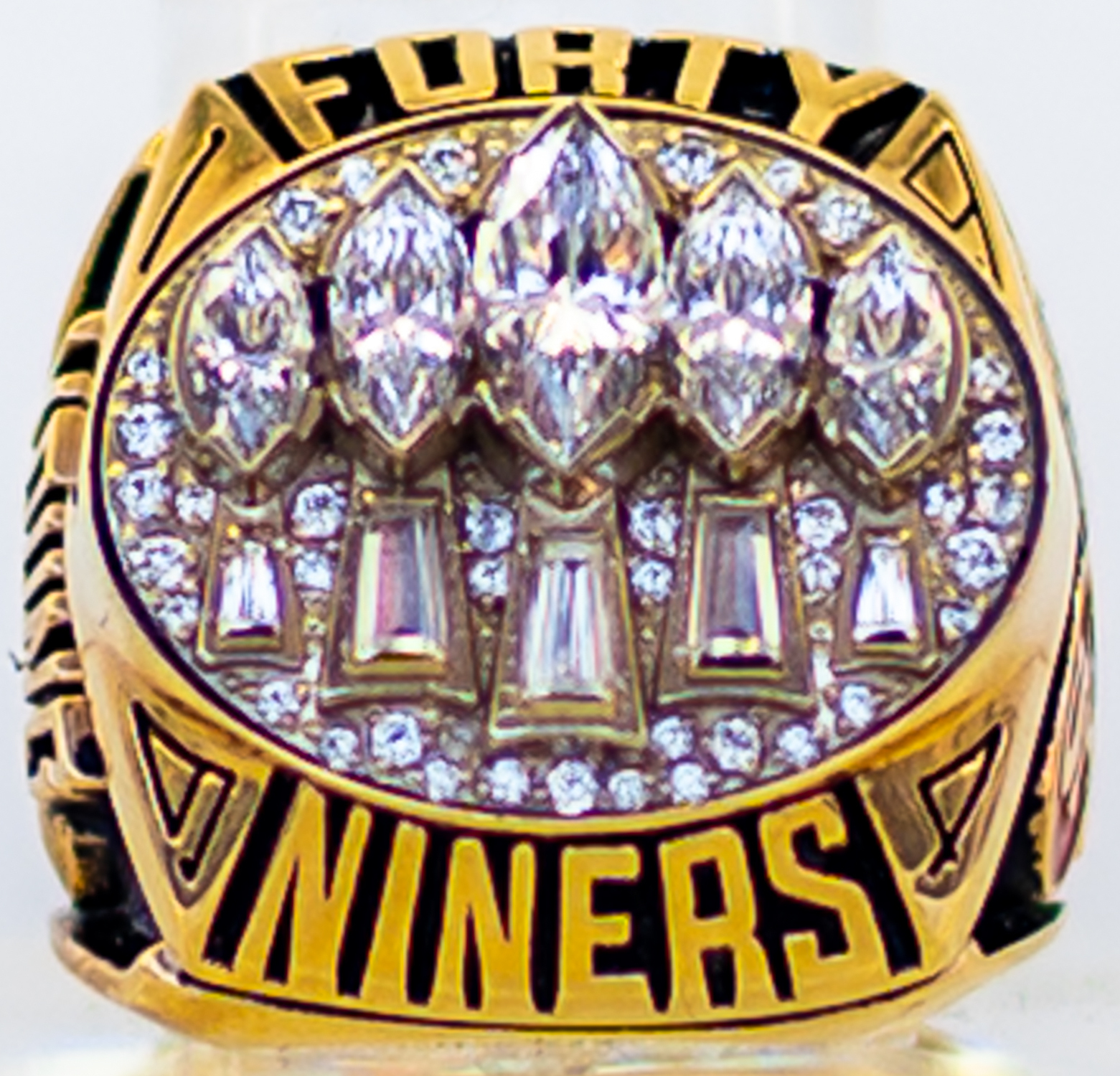
Super Bowl XXIX
(San Francisco 49ers)

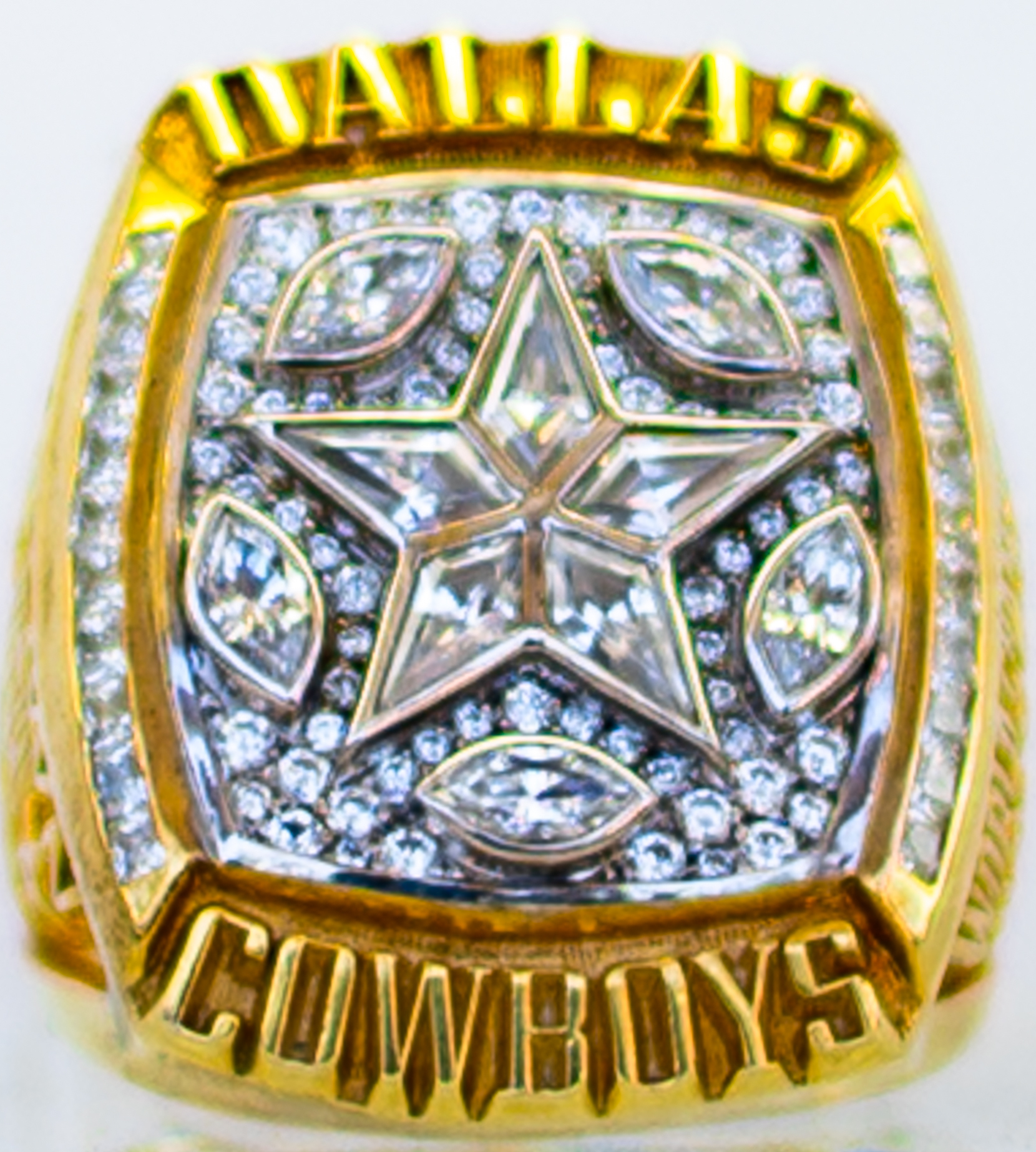
Super Bowl XXX
(Dallas Cowboys)

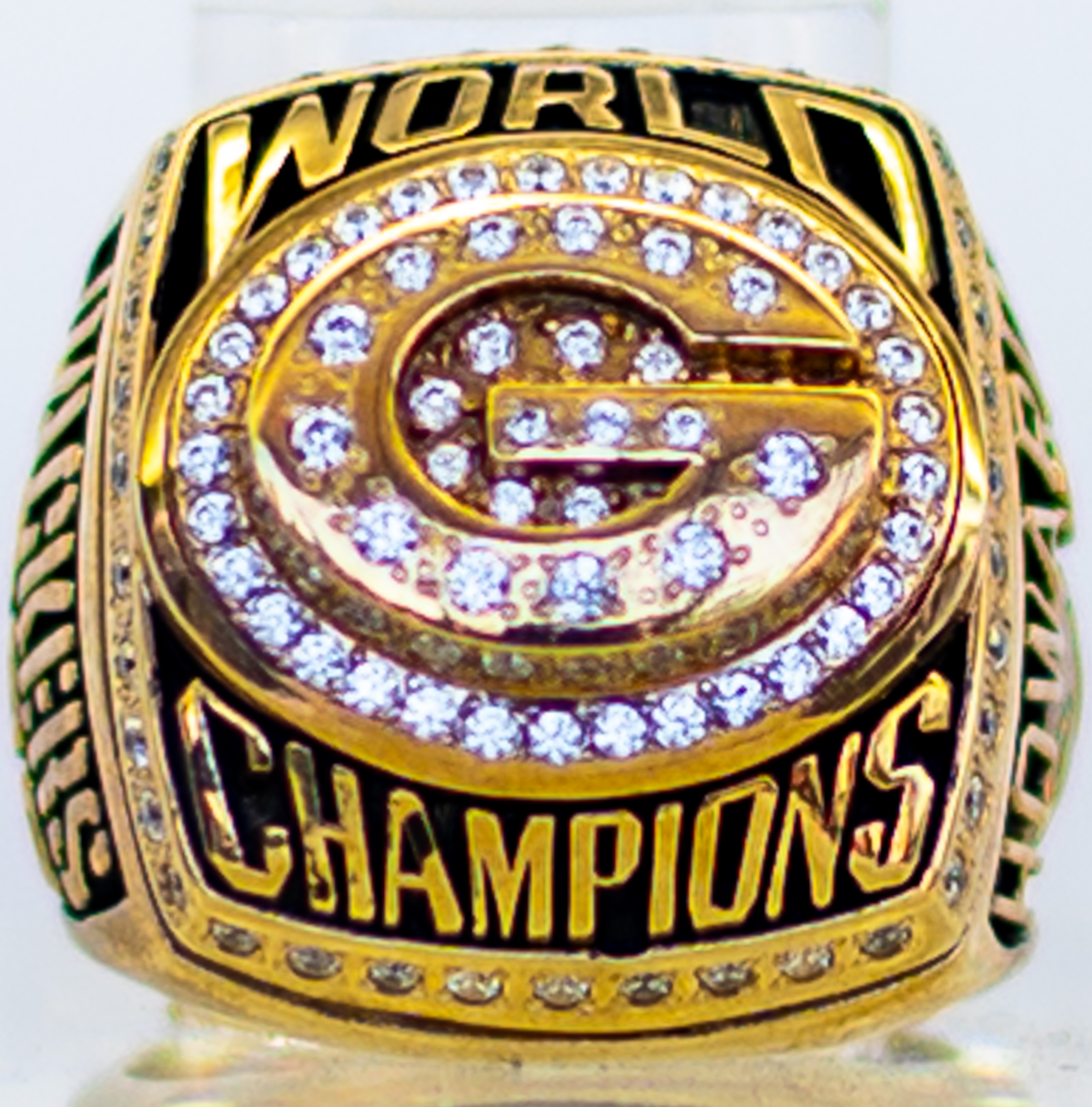
Super Bowl XXXI
(Green Bay Packers)

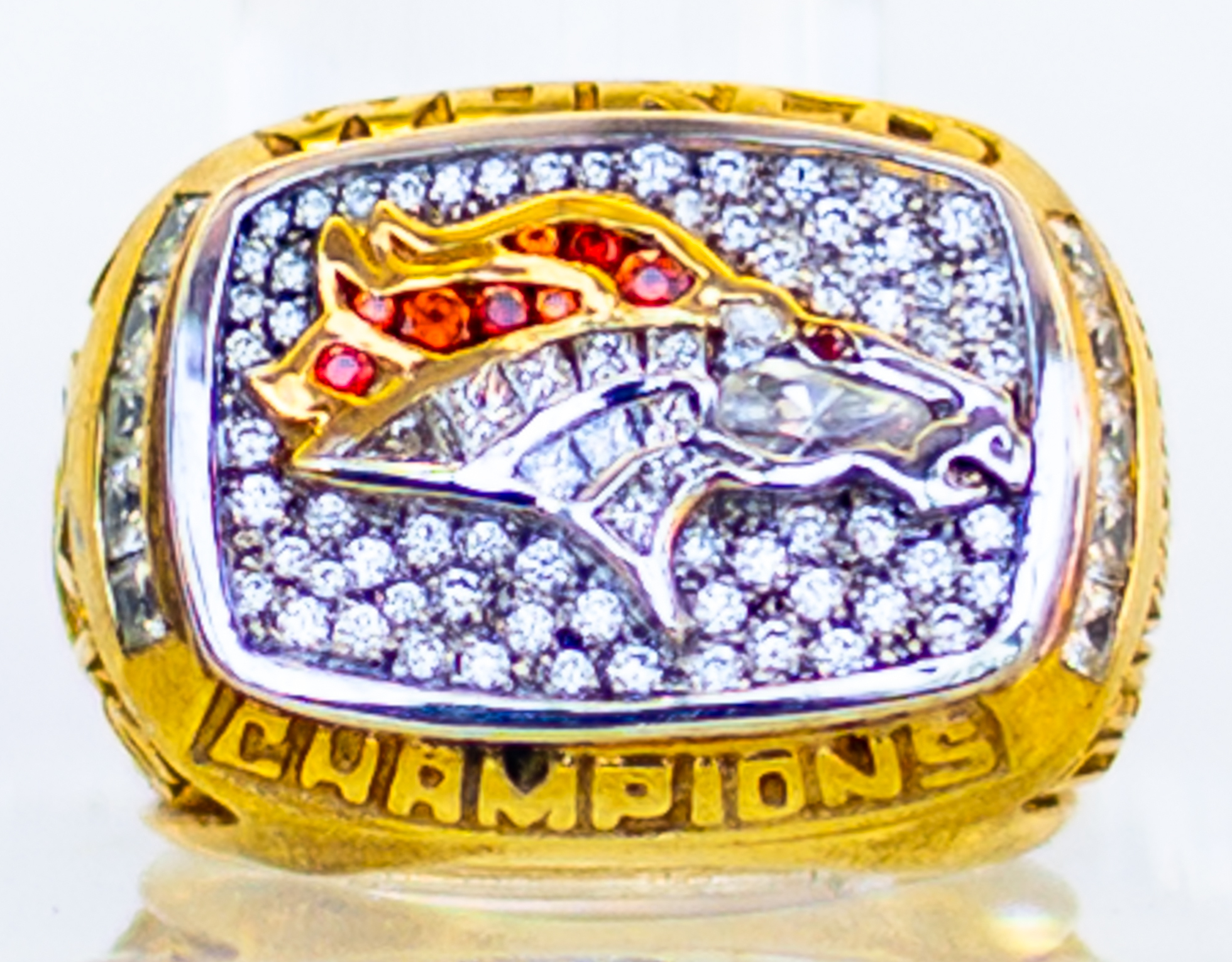
Super Bowl XXXII
(Denver Broncos)

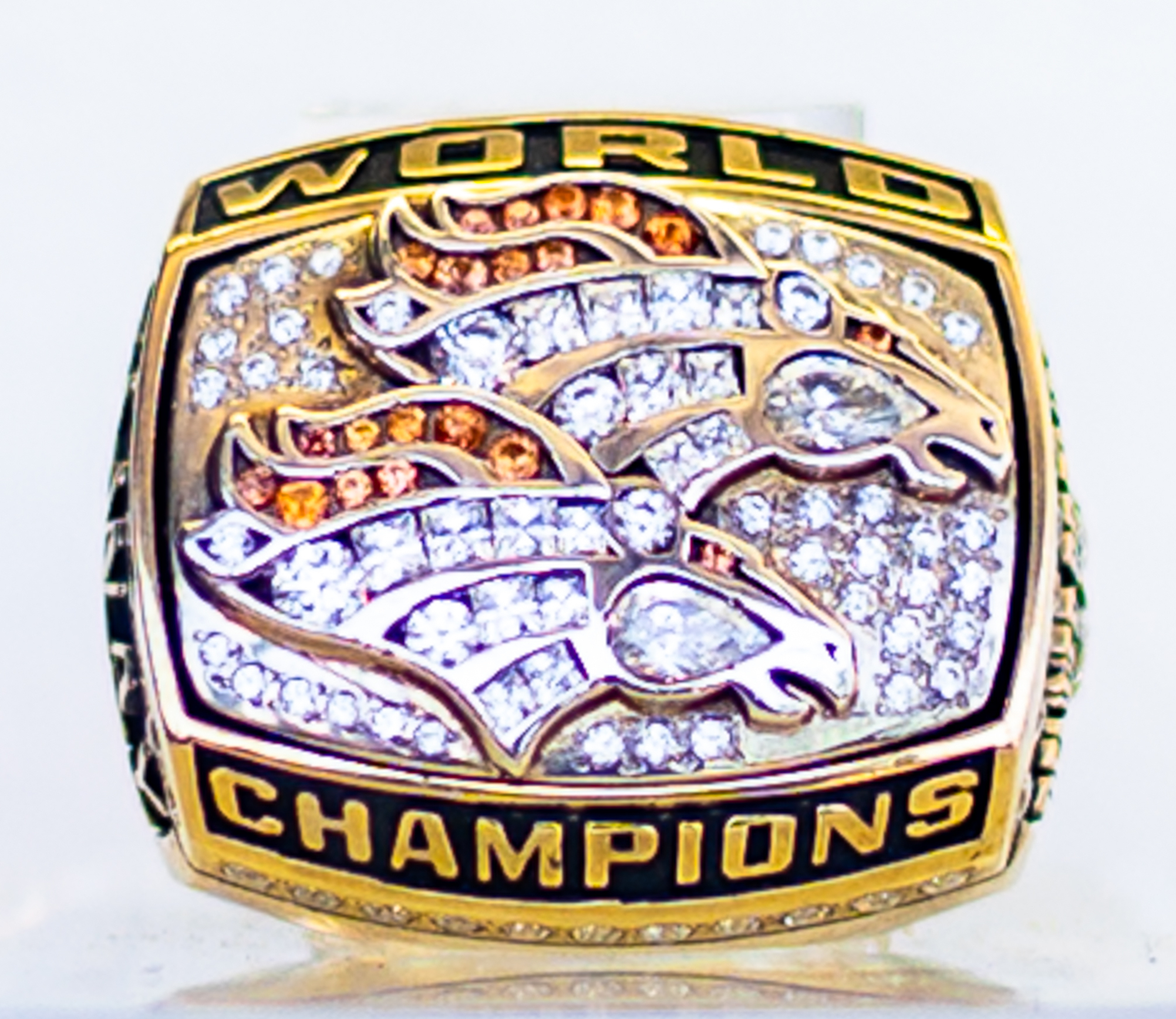
Super Bowl XXXIII
(Denver Broncos)

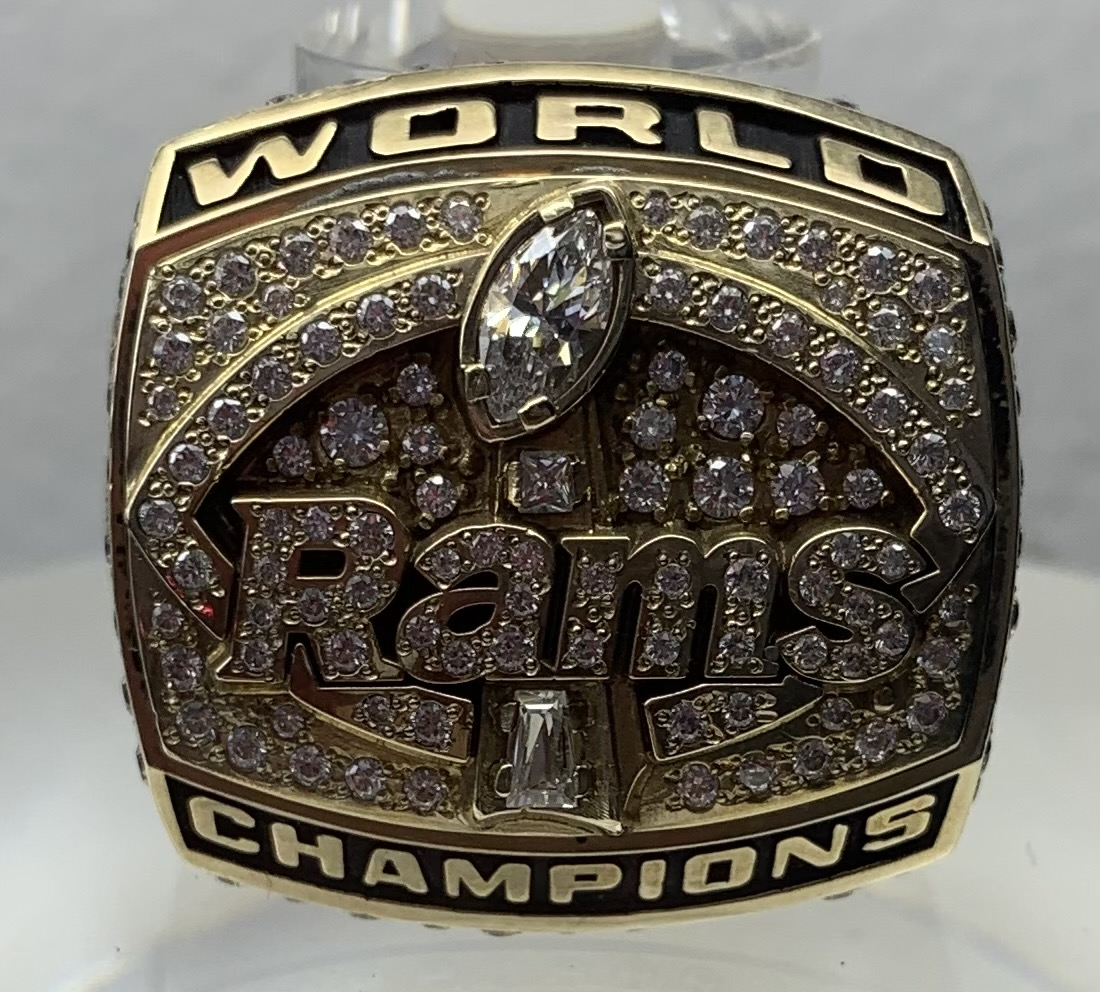
Super Bowl XXXIV
(St. Louis Rams)

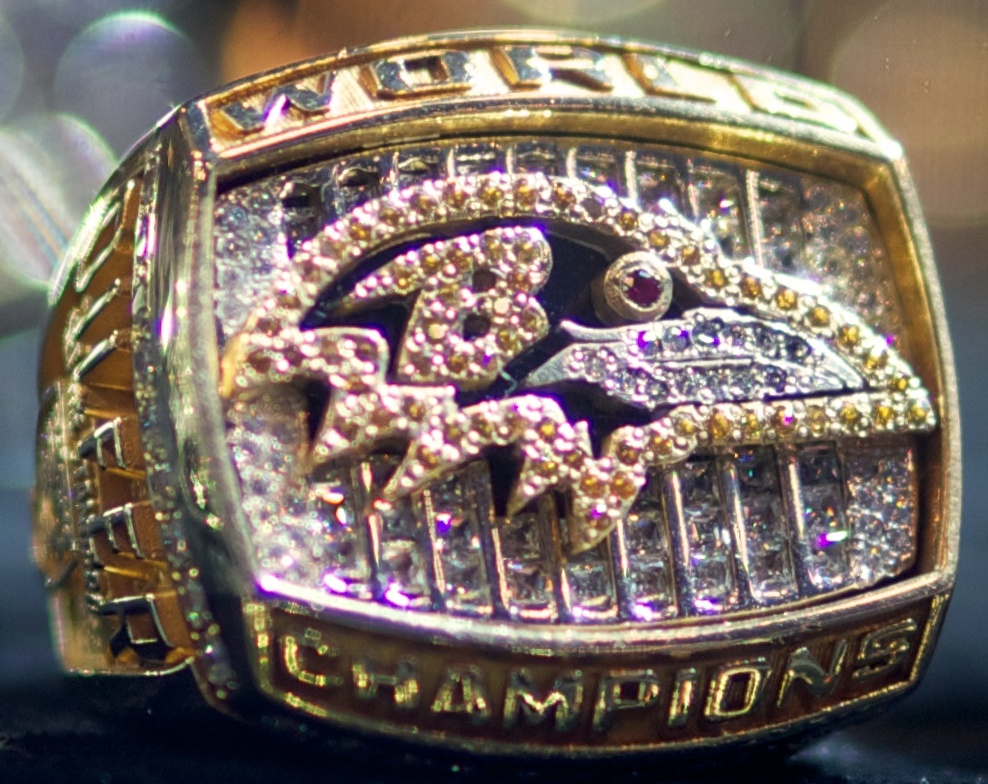
Super Bowl XXXV
(Baltimore Ravens)

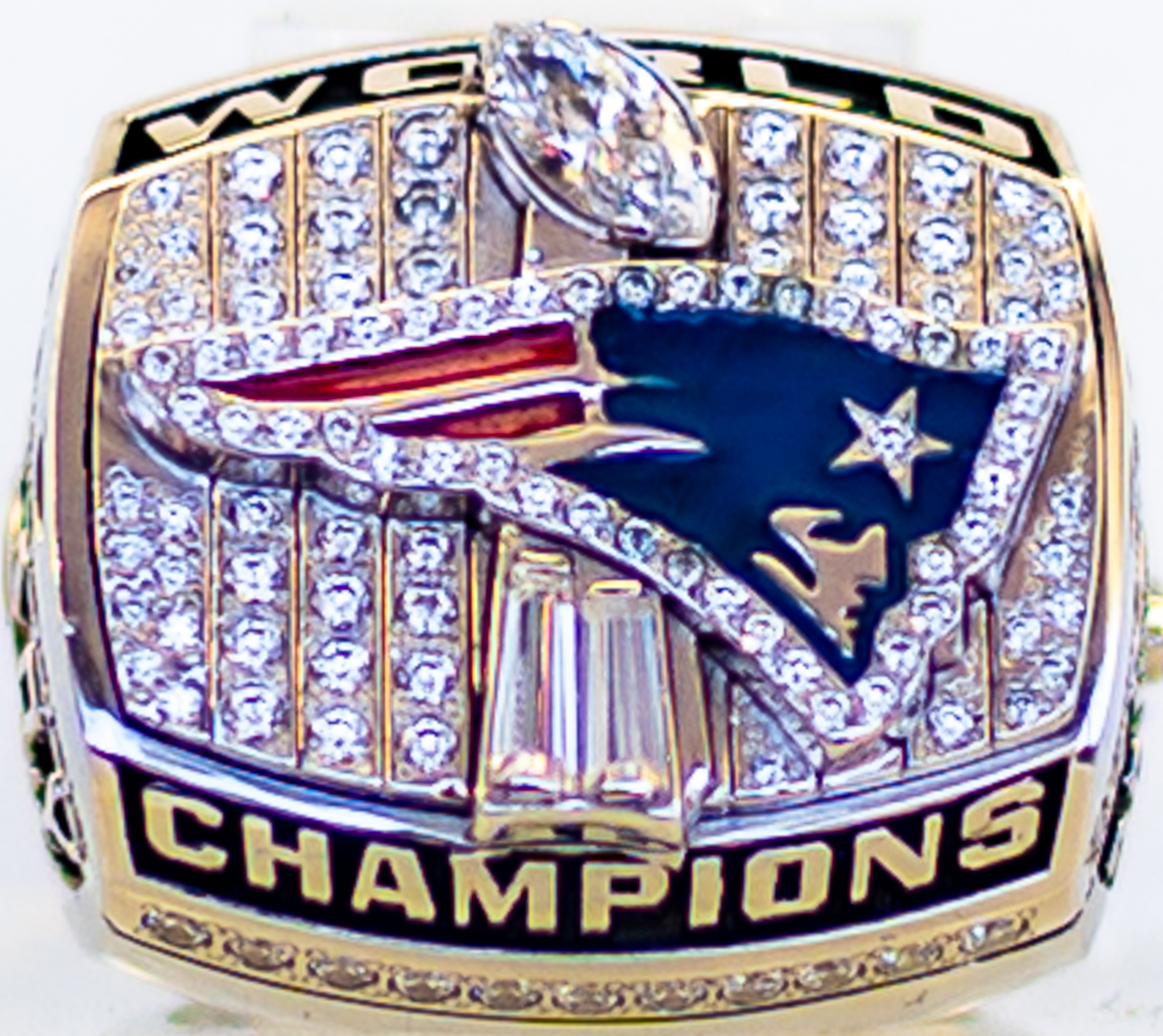
Super Bowl XXXVI
(New England Patriots)

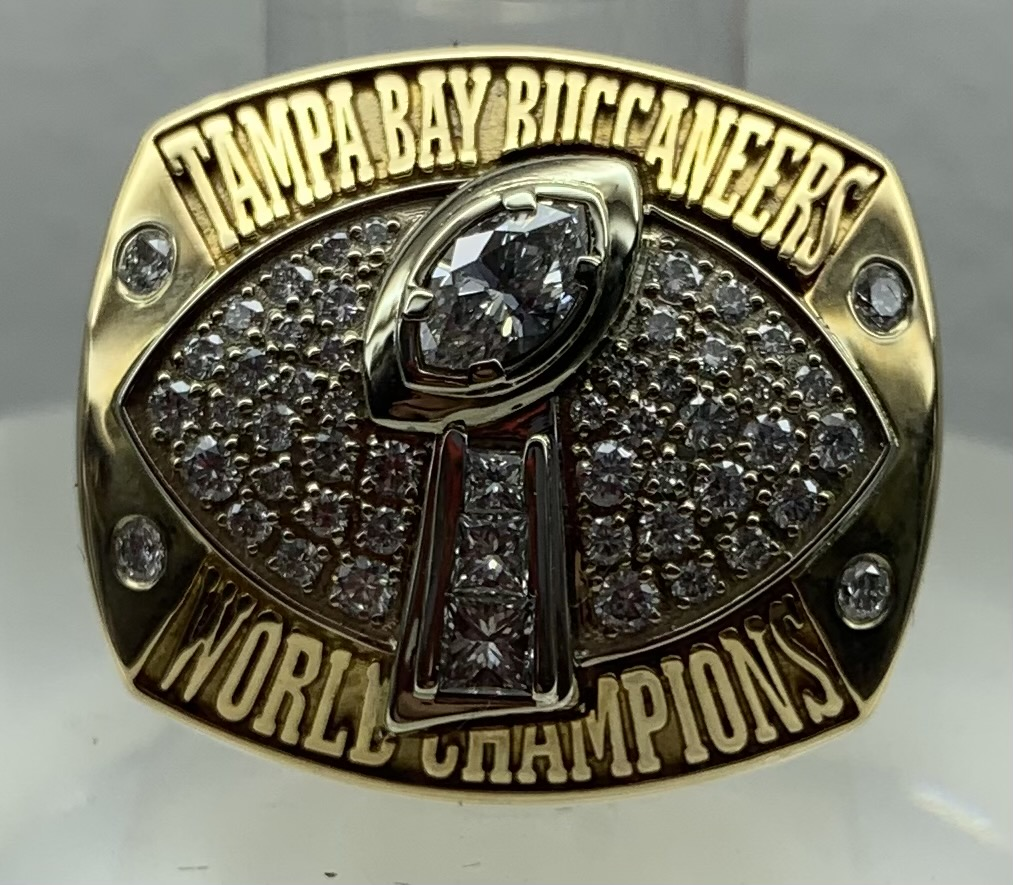
Super Bowl XXXVII
(Tampa Bay Buccaneers)

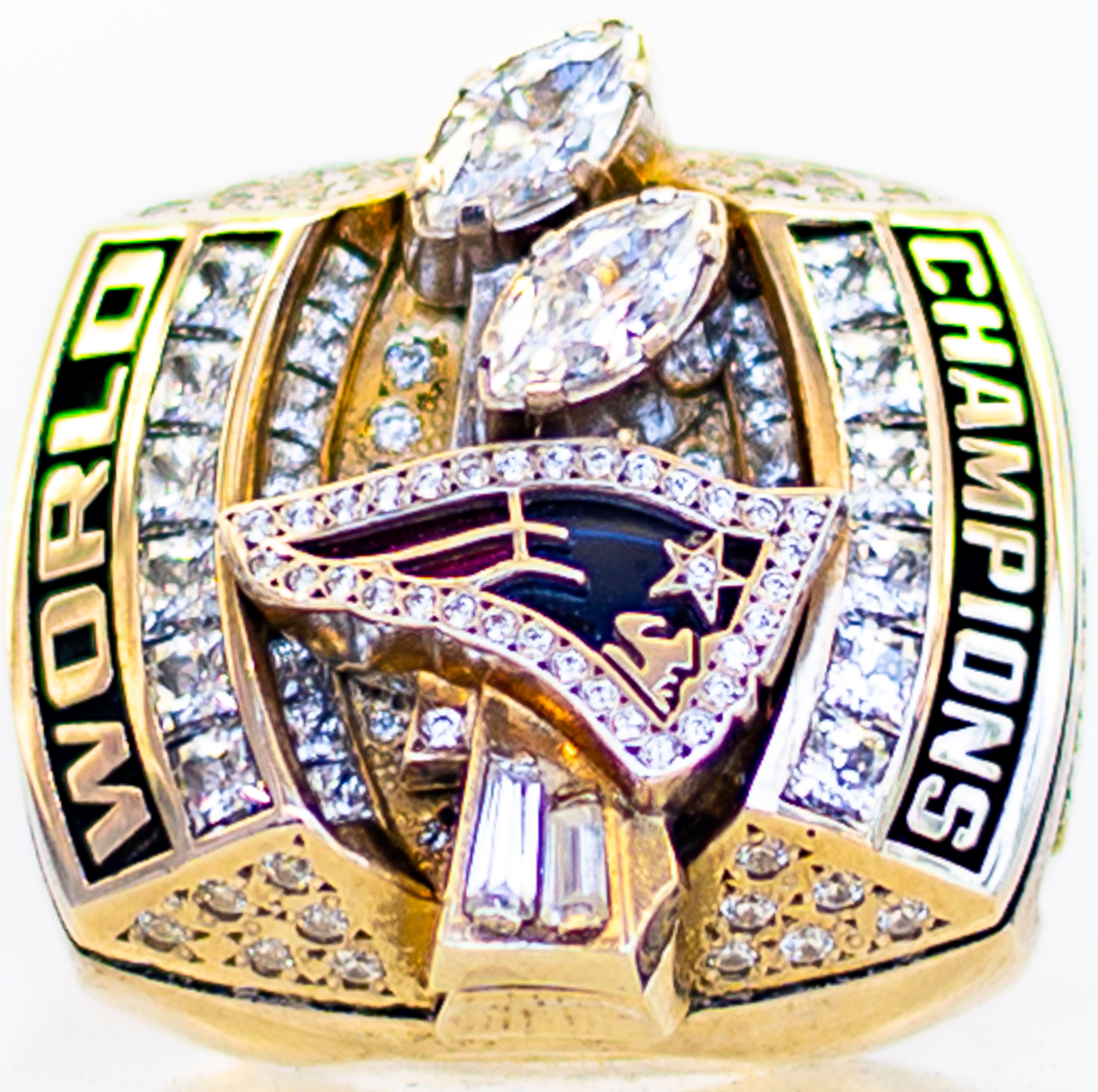
Super Bowl XXXVIII
(New England Patriots)

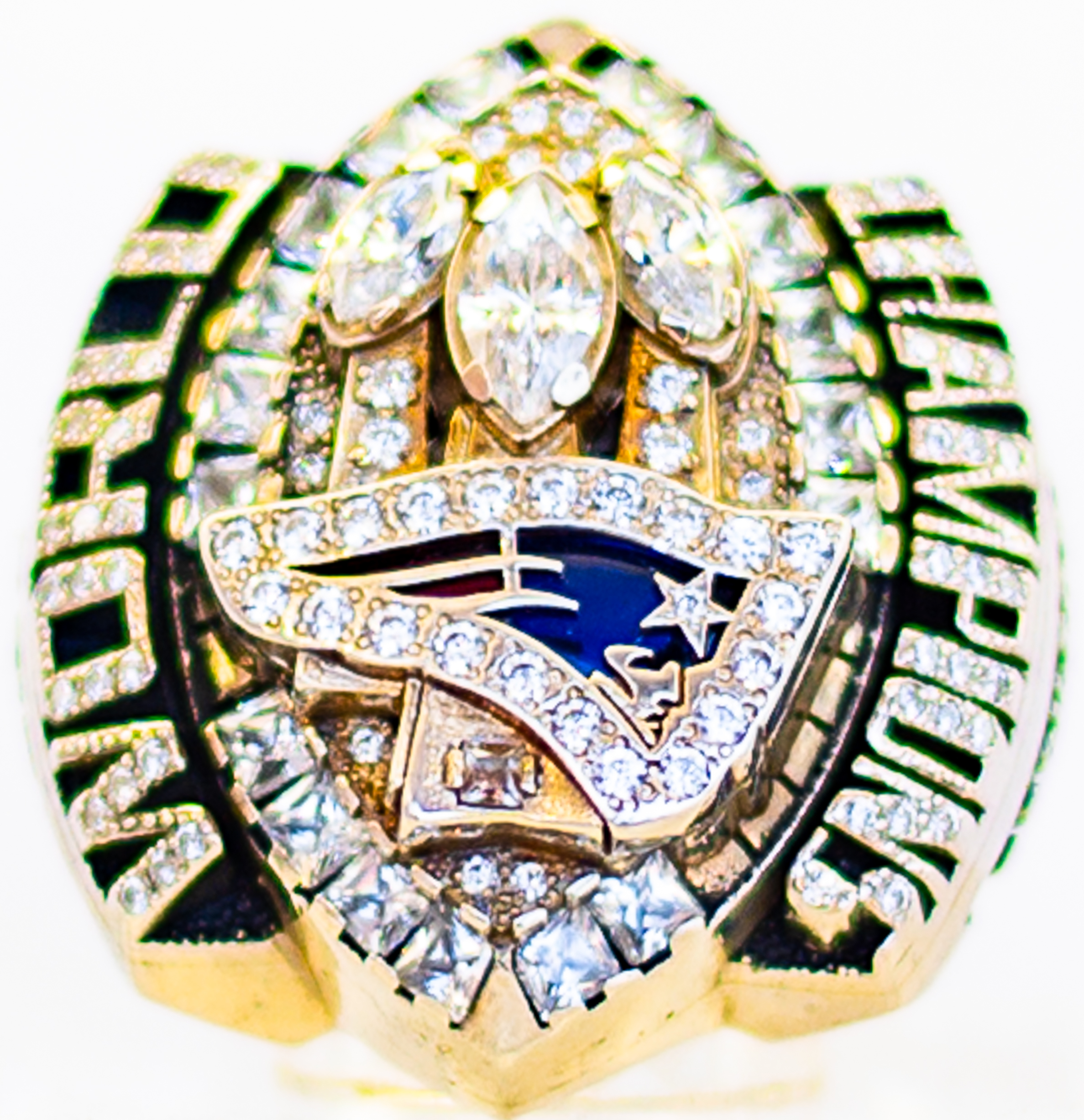
Super Bowl XXXIX
(New England Patriots)

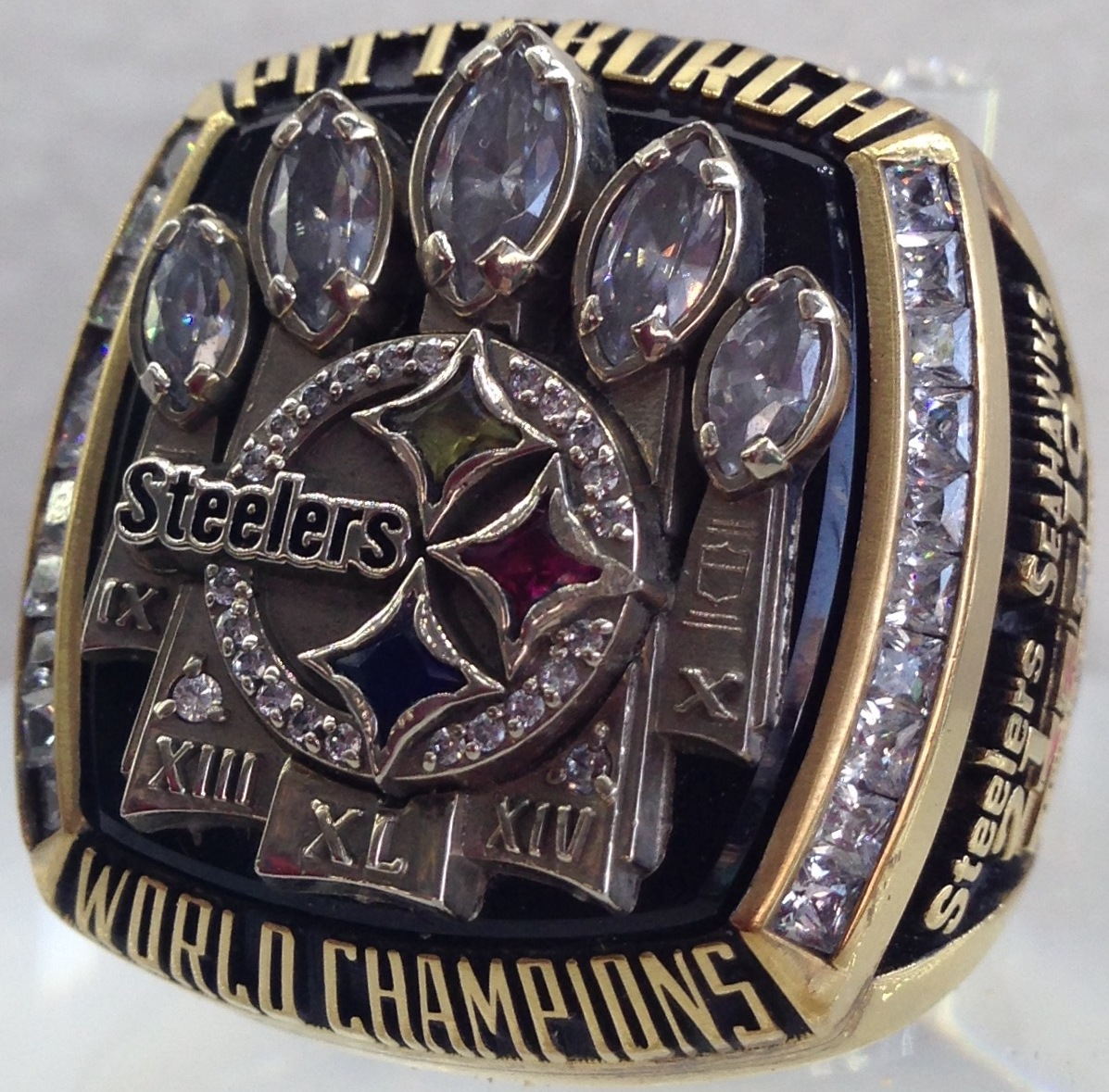
Super Bowl XL
(Pittsburgh Steelers)

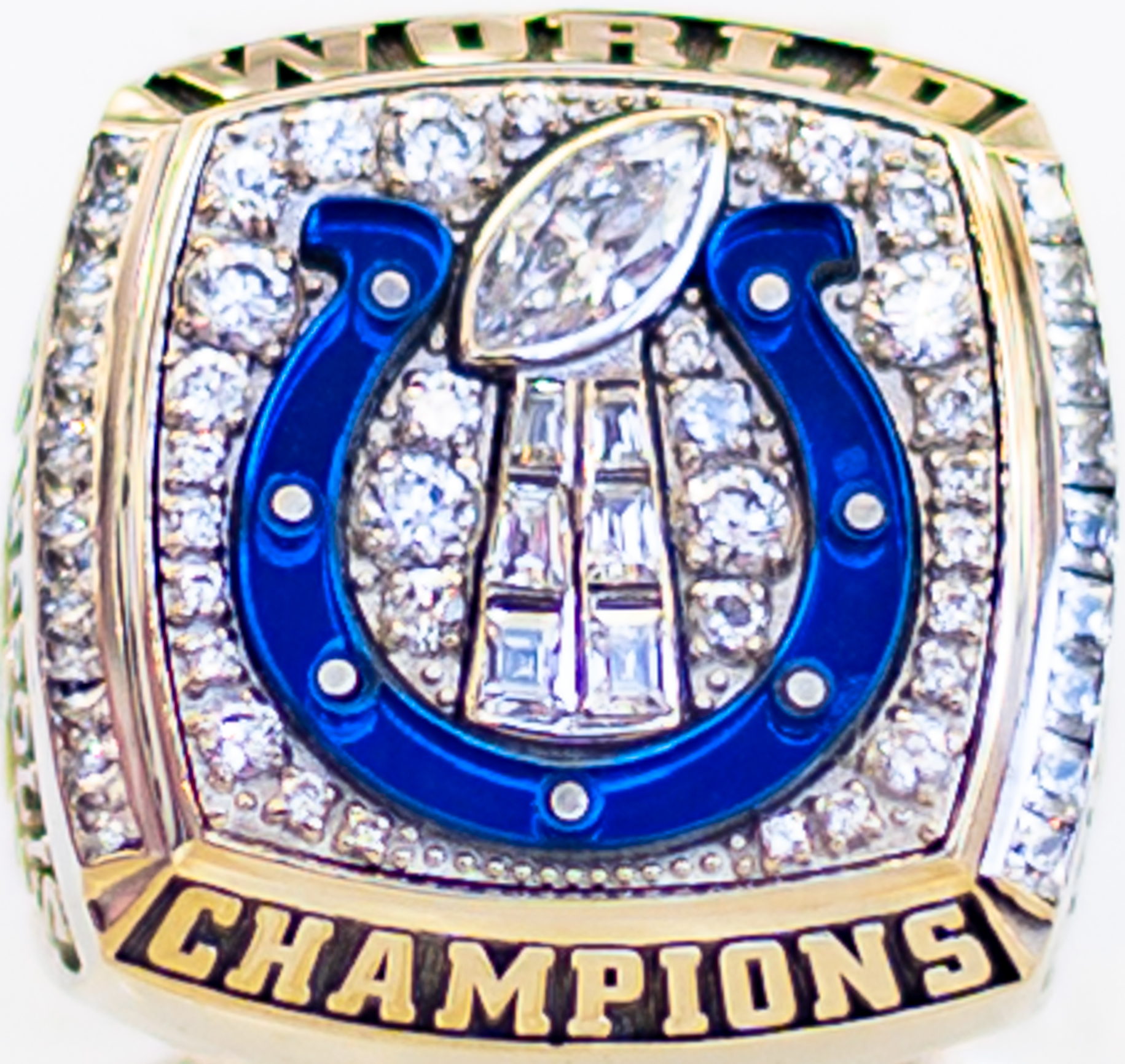
Super Bowl XLI
(Indianapolis Colts)

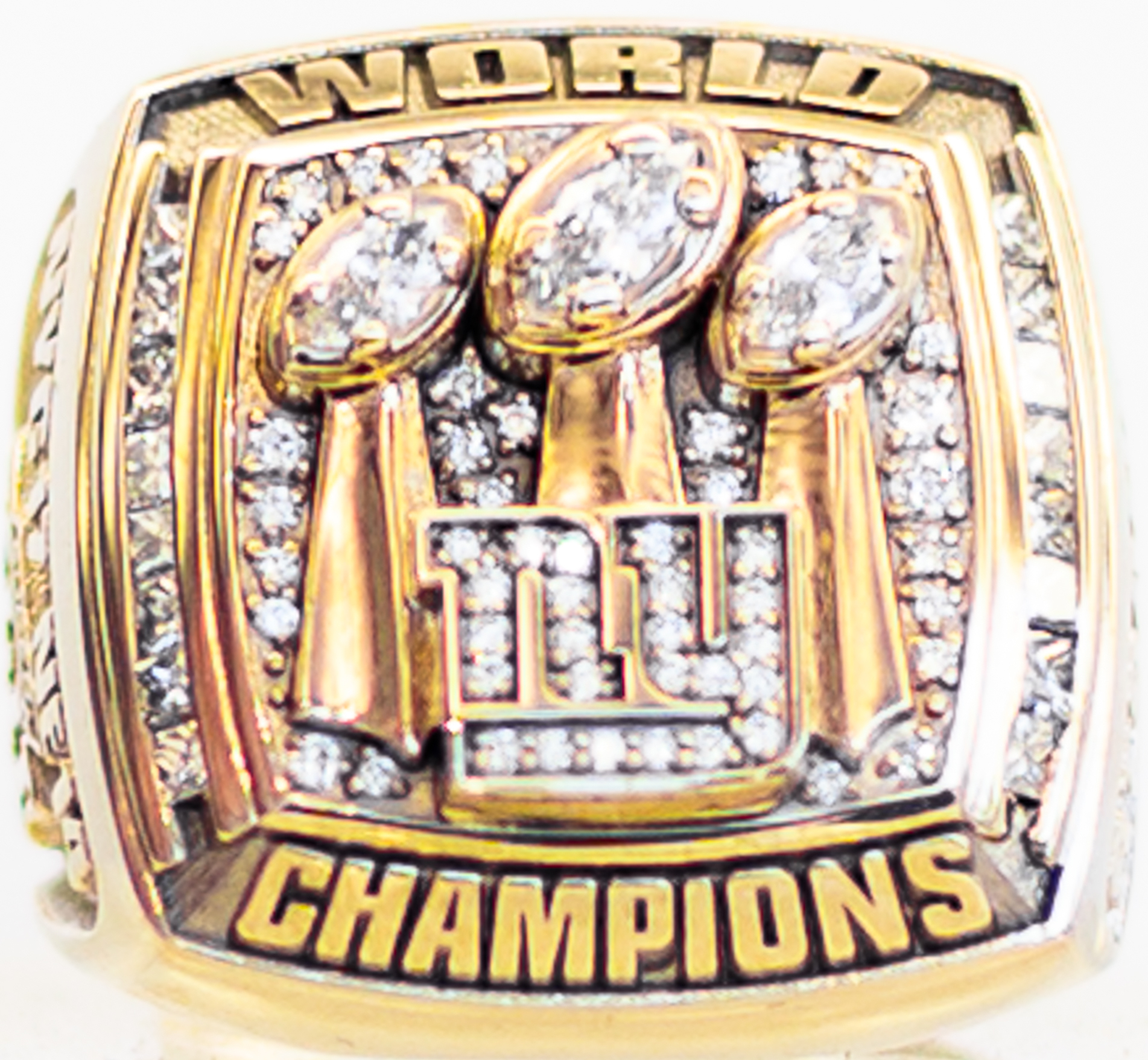
Super Bowl XLII
(New York Giants)

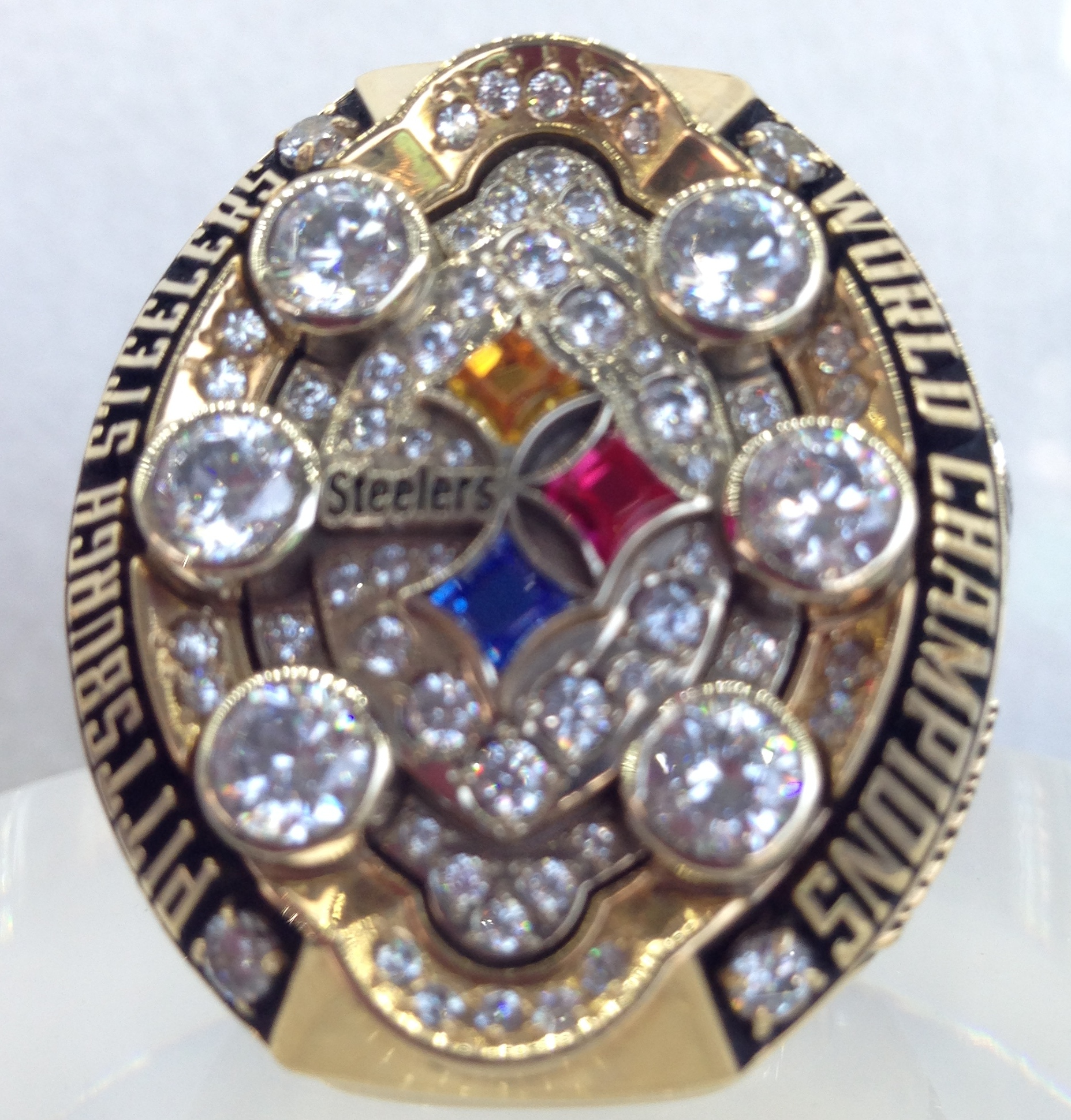
Super Bowl XLIII
(Pittsburgh Steelers)

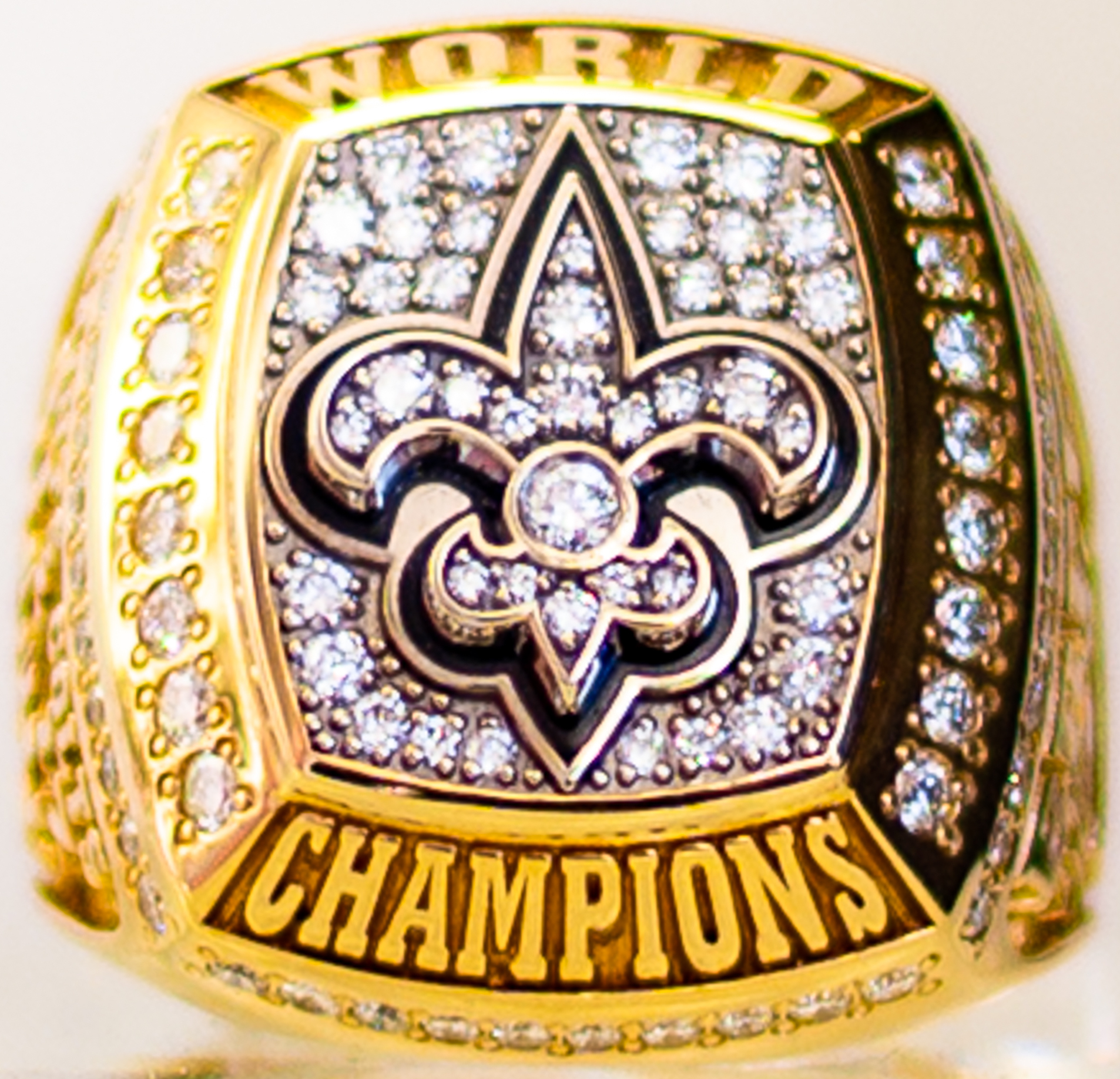
Super Bowl XLIV
(New Orleans Saints)

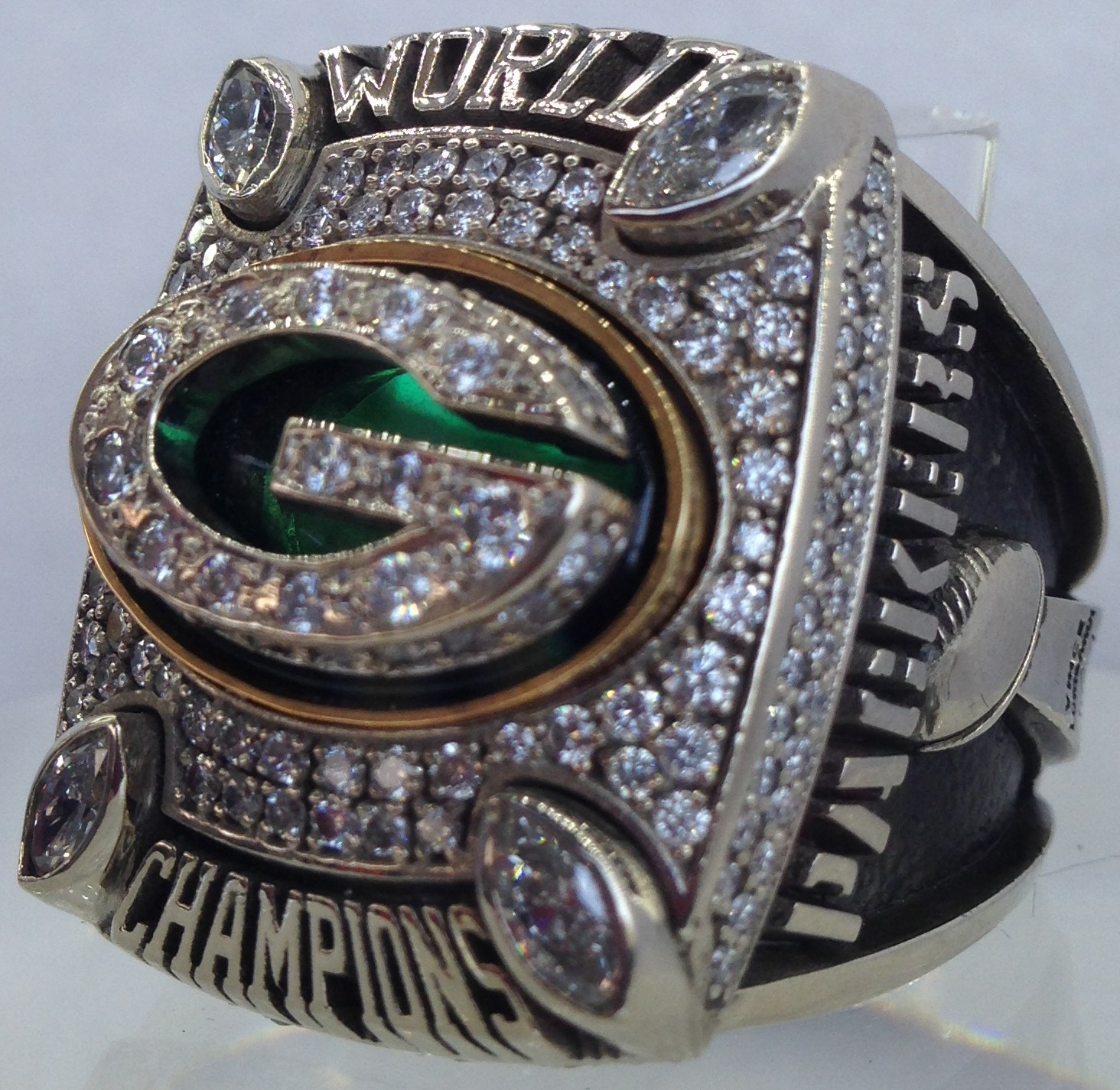
Super Bowl XLV
(Green Bay Packers)

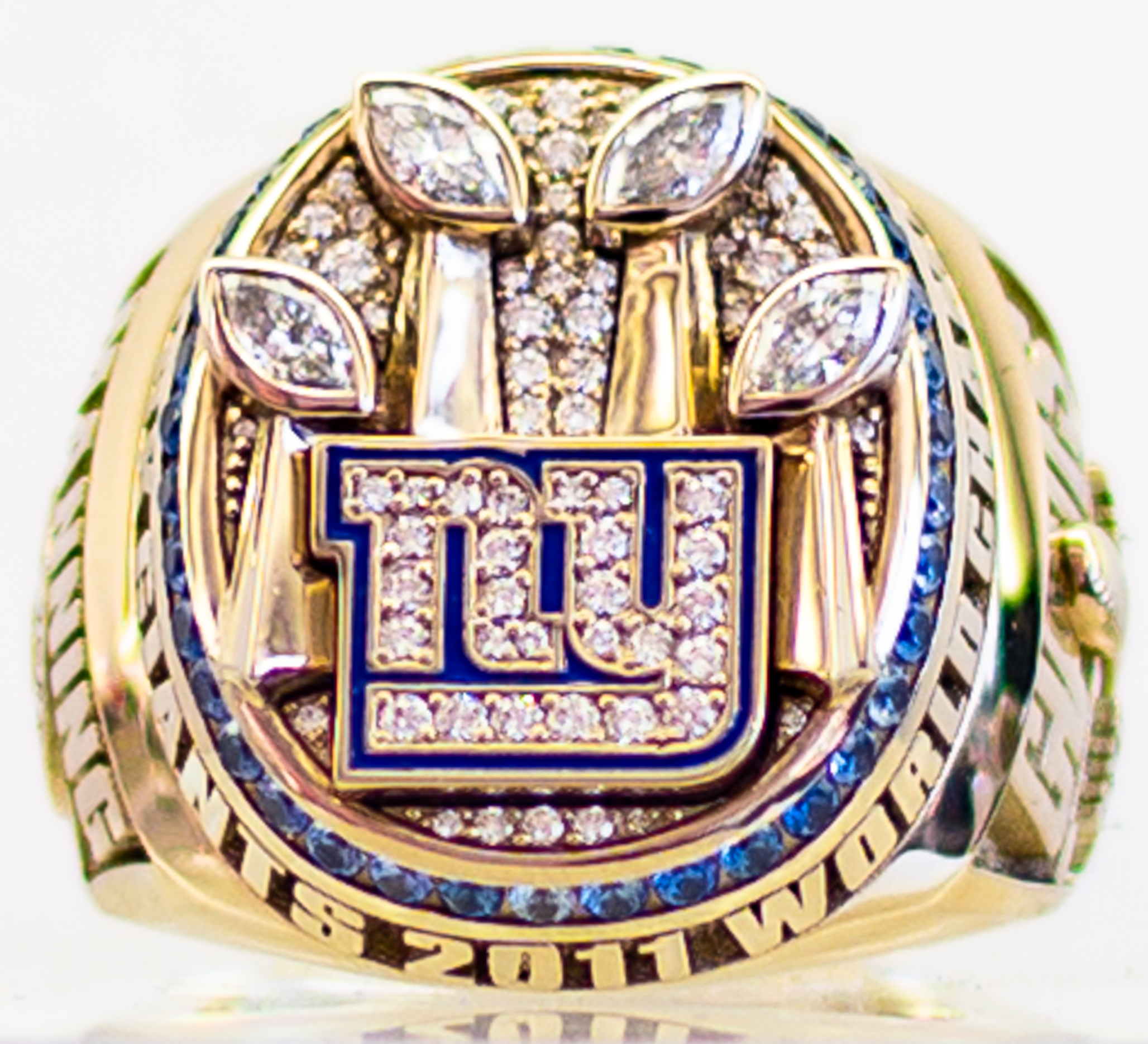
Super Bowl XLVI
(New York Giants)

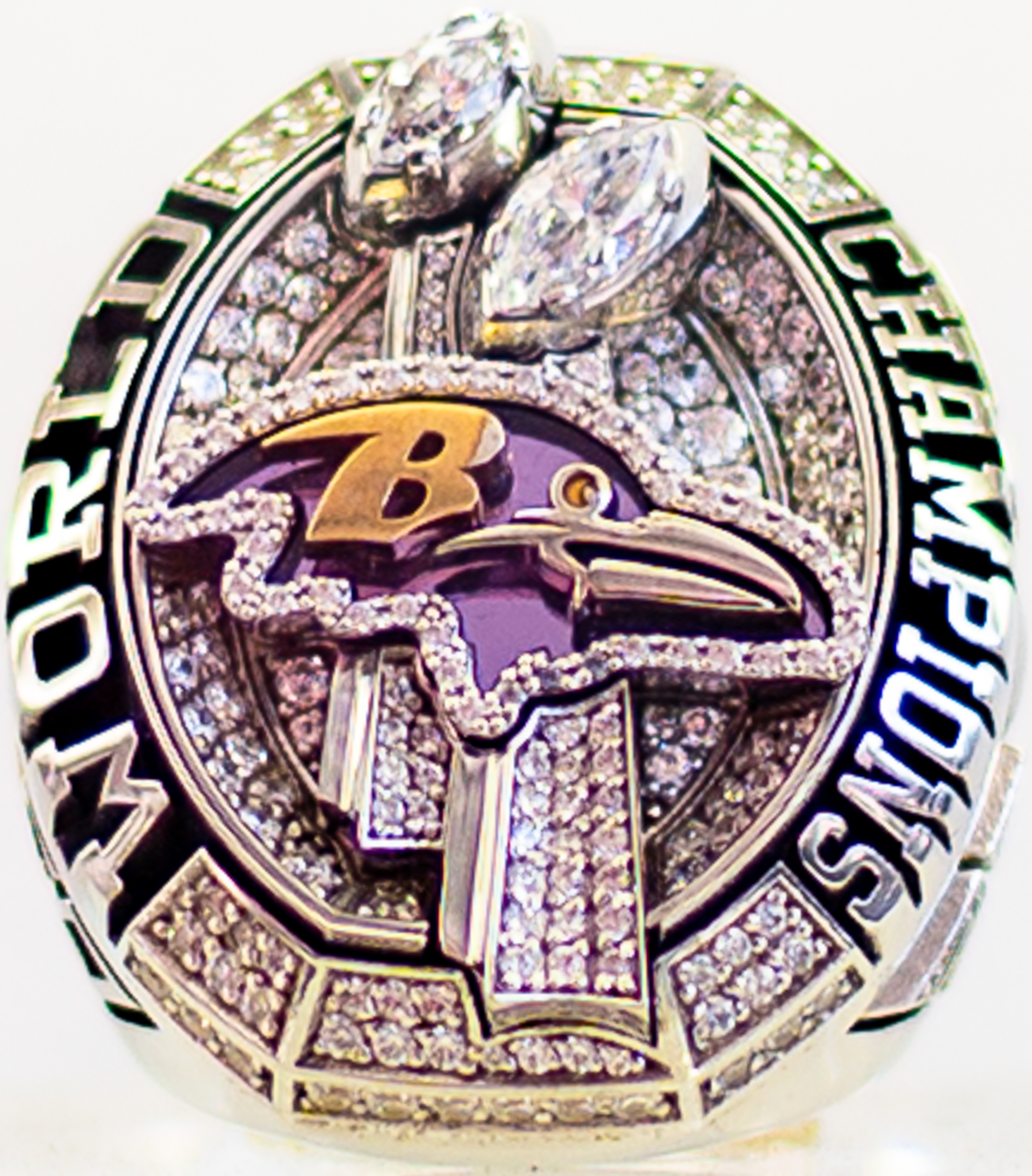
Super Bowl XLVII
(Baltimore Ravens)

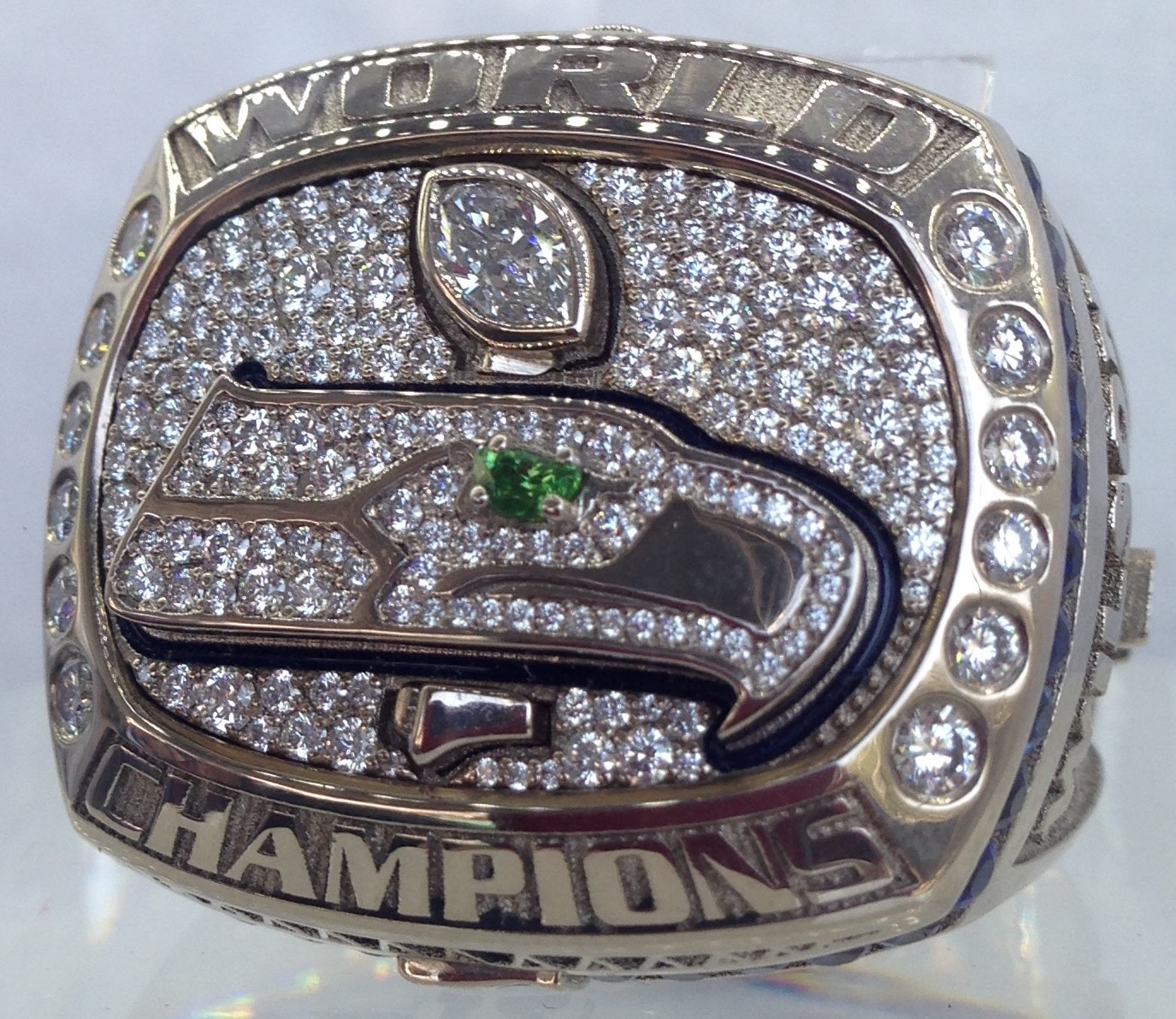
Super Bowl XLVIII
(Seattle Seahawks)

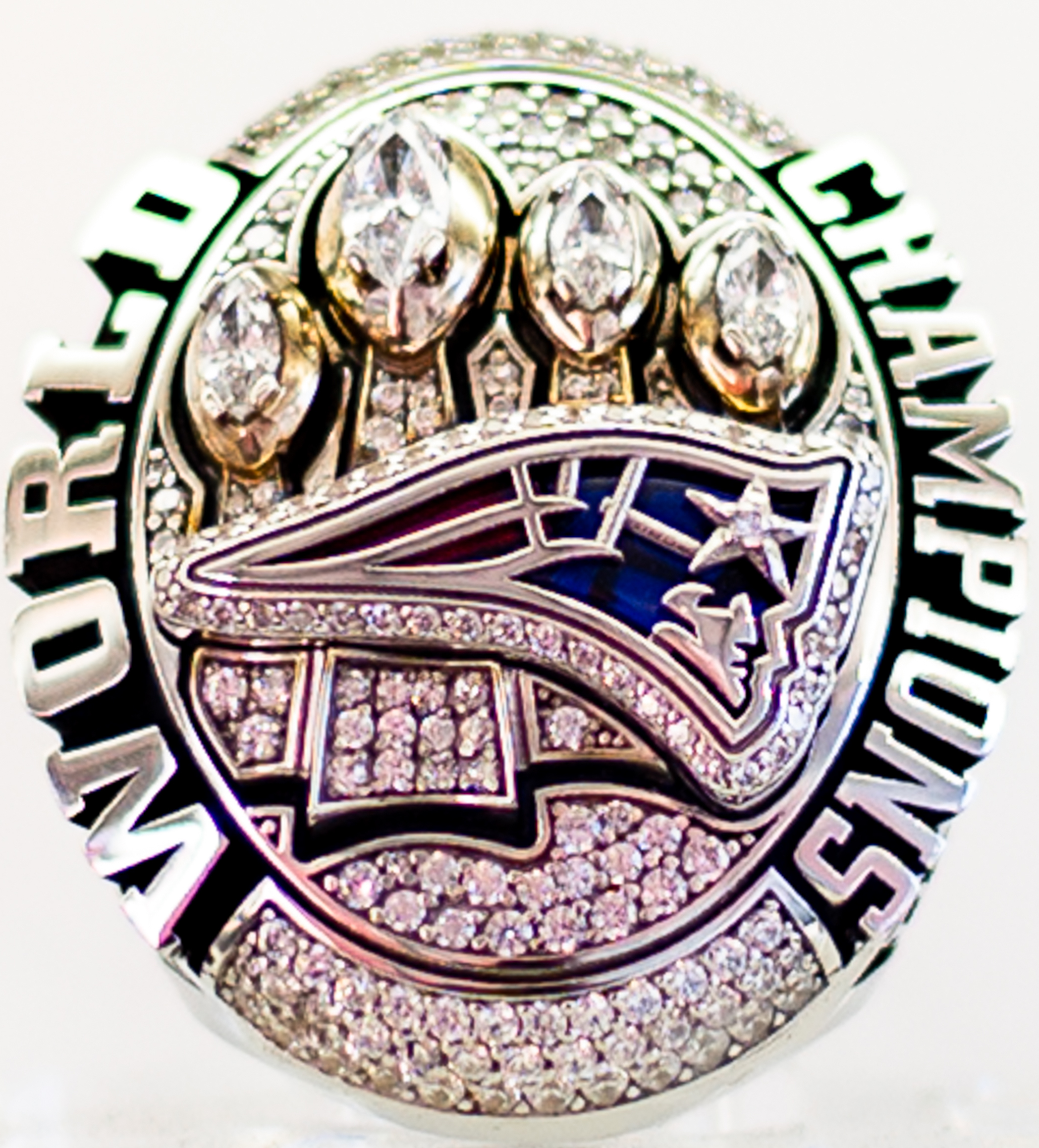
Super Bowl XLIX
(New England Patriots)

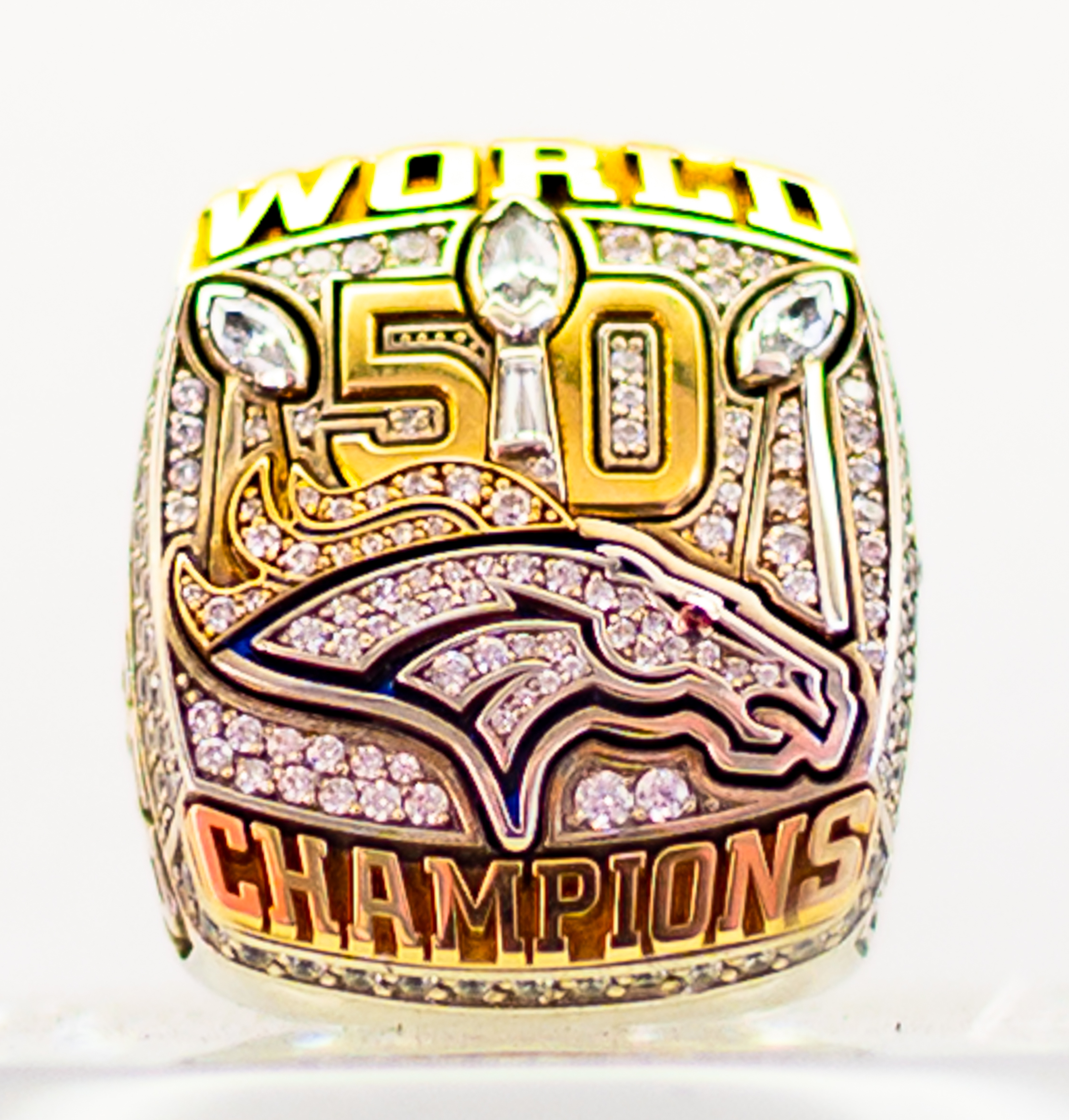
Super Bowl 50
(Denver Broncos)

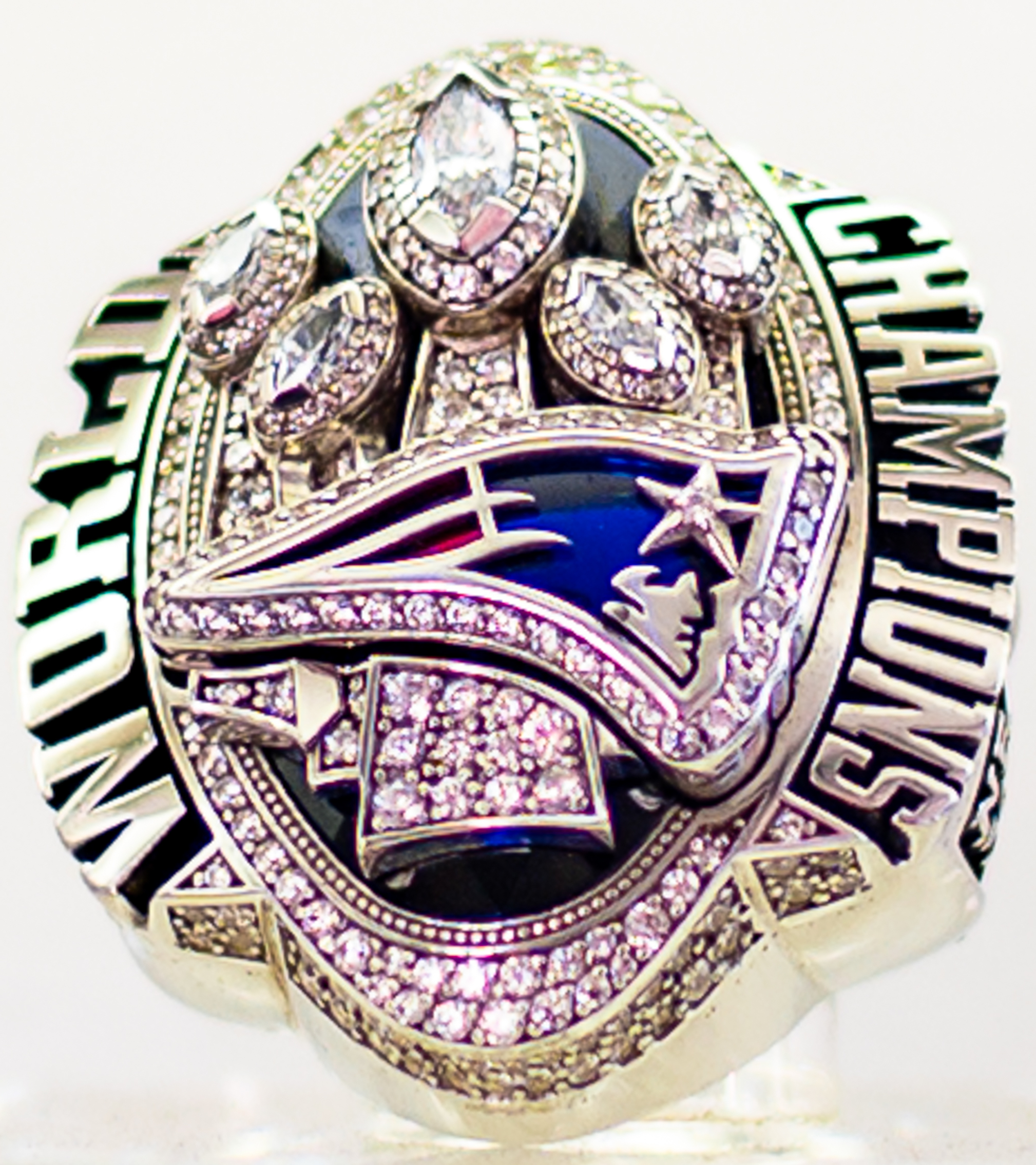
Super Bowl LI
(New England Patriots)

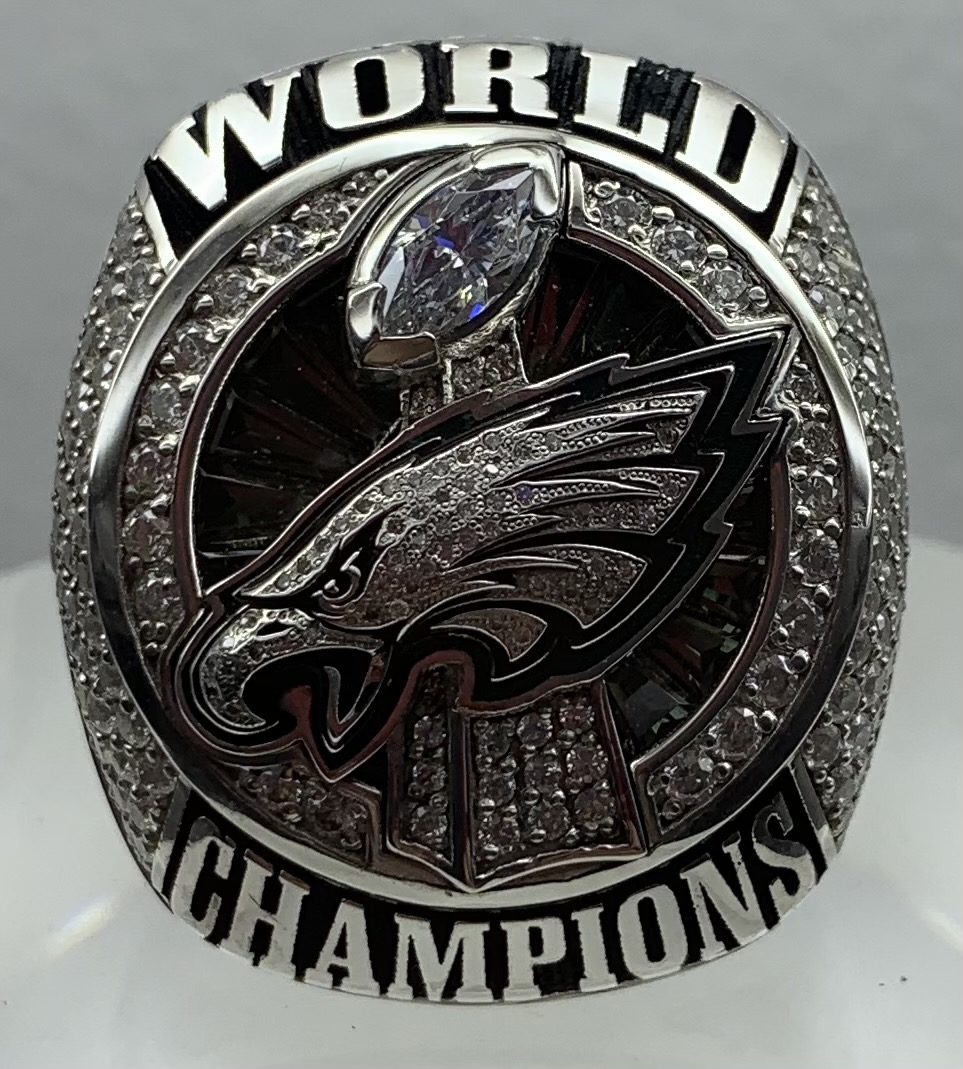
Super Bowl LII
(Philadelphia Eagles)

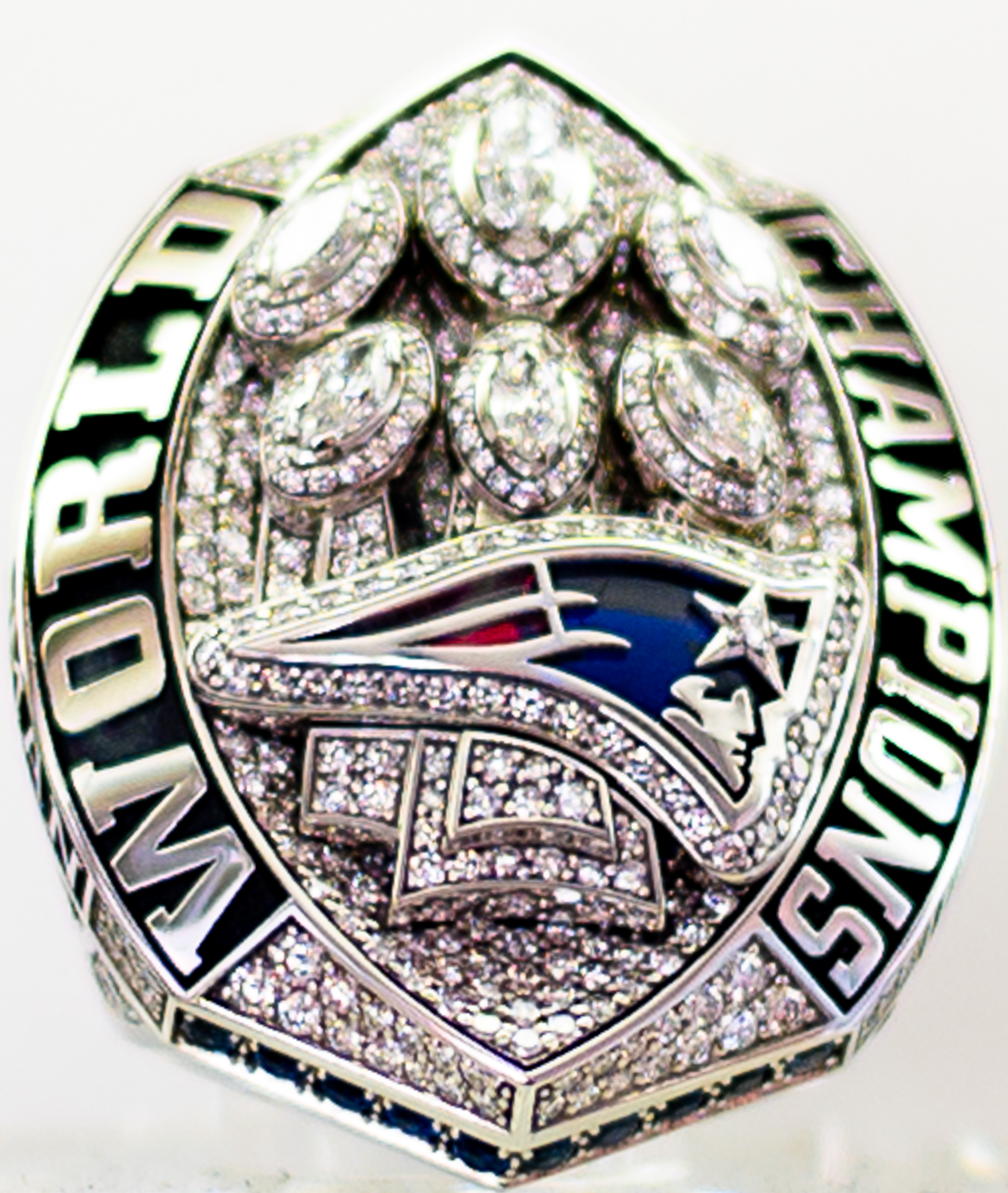
Super Bowl LIII
(New England Patriots)

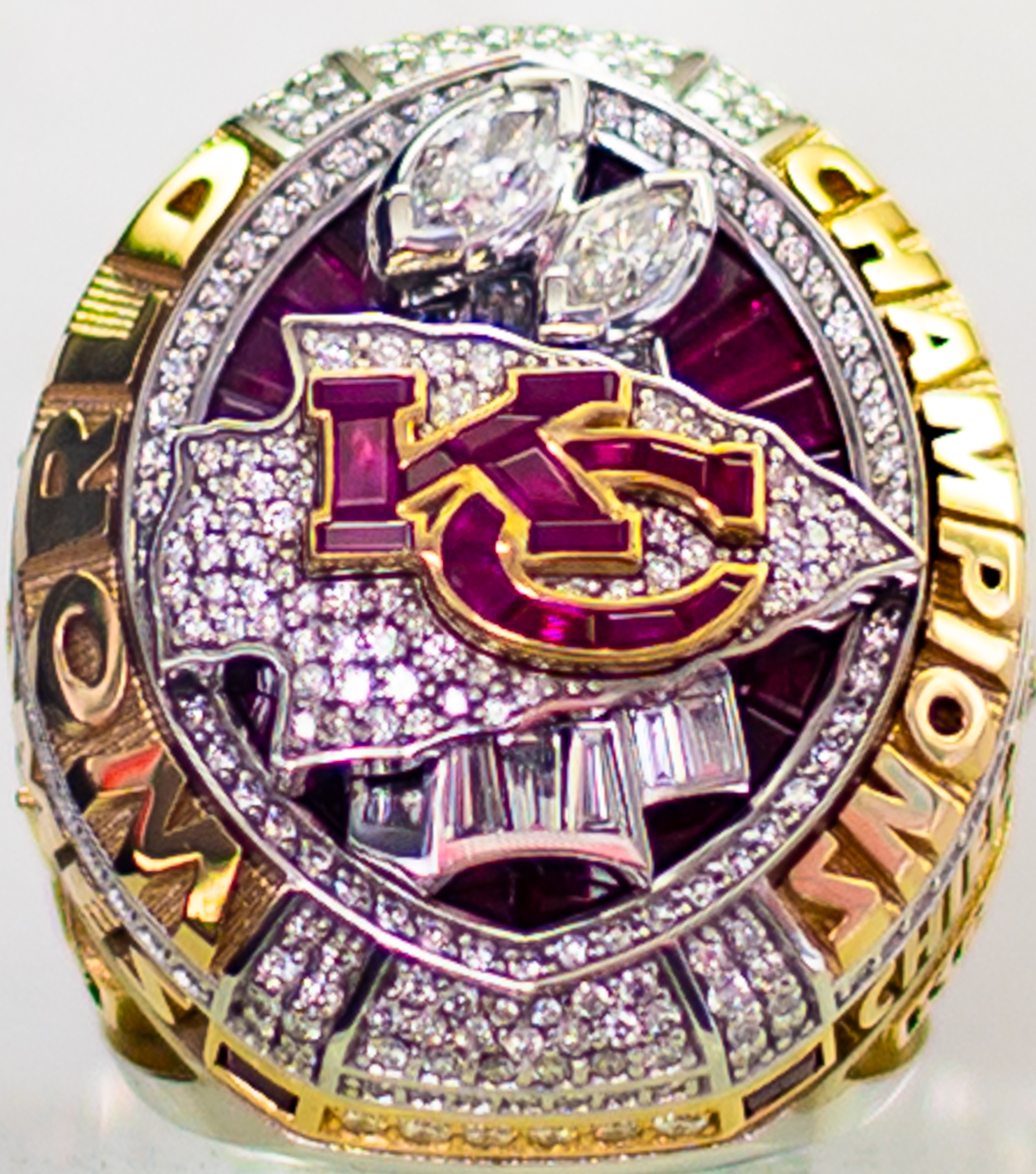
Super Bowl LIV
(Kansas City Chiefs)

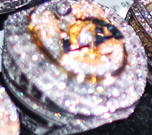
Super Bowl LVI
(Los Angeles Rams)

Super Bowl LVII
(Kansas City Chiefs)

== See also ==
- Championship ring
- MLS Cup ring
- NBA Championship ring
- World Series ring
- List of National Football League awards
