= Gustav A. Anderson =

American politician (1893–1983)

Member of the Minnesota House of Representatives from the 48th district
- In office January 6, 1953 – January 7, 1957

Personal details
- Born: Gustav Adolph Anderson; August 7, 1893 Stevens County, Minnesota, U.S.
- Died: April 7, 1983 (aged 89)
- Resting place: Vinger Cemetery, Donnelly, Minnesota, U.S.
- Party: Democratic (DFL)
- Spouse: Charis (m. 1954)
- Children: 3
- Profession: Politician, farmer

Military service
- Allegiance: United States
- Branch/service: United States Army
- Battles/wars: World War I

Gustav Adolph "G.A." Anderson (August 7, 1893 – April 7, 1983), also known as Oddie Anderson, was an American politician and farmer who served in the Minnesota House of Representatives from 1953 to 1957, representing the 48th legislative district of Minnesota in the 58th and 59th Minnesota Legislatures.

== Early life and education ==
Anderson was born in Stevens County, Minnesota on August 7, 1893.

== Career ==
Anderson served in the United States Army during World War I.

Anderson served as a chairman of the Stevens County Democratic–Farmer–Labor Party.

Anderson served in the Minnesota House of Representatives from 1953 to 1957, representing the 48th legislative district of Minnesota in the 58th and 59th Minnesota Legislatures.

During his time in office, Anderson served on the following committees.

- Agriculture (1953–1954)
- Cooperatives (1953–1956)
- Drainage and Soil Conservation (1953–1956)
- Game and Fish (1953–1956)
- Veterans and Military Affairs (1953–1954)
- Dairy Products and Livestock (1955–1956)
- Engrossment and Enrollment (1955–1956)
- Motor Vehicles (1955–1956)
- Welfare (1955–1956)

Anderson's time in office began on January 6, 1953 and concluded on January 7, 1957. His district included representation for Stevens County.

Anderson's victory in the 1952 election was unsuccessfully contested by Al F. Riedner.

Anderson was a Democrat. He was a member of the conservative caucus during his first term and a member of the liberal caucus during his second term.

Outside of the Minnesota Legislature, Anderson was a grain and stock farmer.

== Personal life and death ==
Though Anderson was a widower when he was first elected to the Minnesota Legislature, he married on December 4, 1954 while serving in the legislature. He had three children.

Anderson was a Lutheran. He resided in Morris, Minnesota.

Anderson died at the age of 89 on April 7, 1983. He was buried in Vinger Cemetery, located in Donnelly, Minnesota.

Minnesota House of Representatives
Preceded by —	Member of the Minnesota House of Representatives from the 48th district 1953–1957	Succeeded by —
