= Mox =

Mox or MOX may refer to:

== People ==
- Jon Moxley (born 1985), American professional wrestler
- Mox McQuery (1861–1900), American baseball player

== Technology ==
- Microsoft Open XML, a file format
- Mixed oxide fuel, used in nuclear power plants

== Other uses ==
- Molima language
- Morris Municipal Airport, in Minnesota, United States
- Mox-Linde Gases, a Malaysian manufacturer of industrial gases
- Mox Peaks, in Washington, United States
- Mox, a type of card in the Power Nine group of Magic: The Gathering
- Mox, a character in the film Varsity Blues
- "Mox", a story featuring fictional vigilante The Shadow
- MOX, a music workstation synthesiser in the Yamaha Motif series
- MOX optics, a European manufacturer of high-quality ski and sports eyewear.
