= Superior Industries =

Superior Industries, Inc.
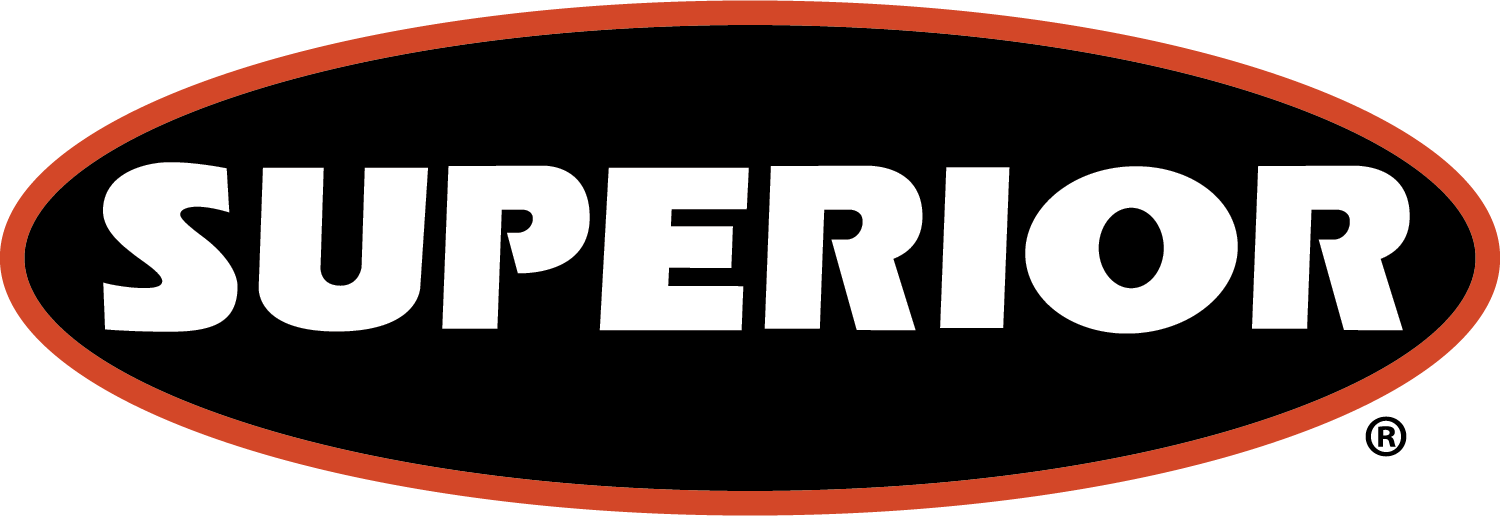

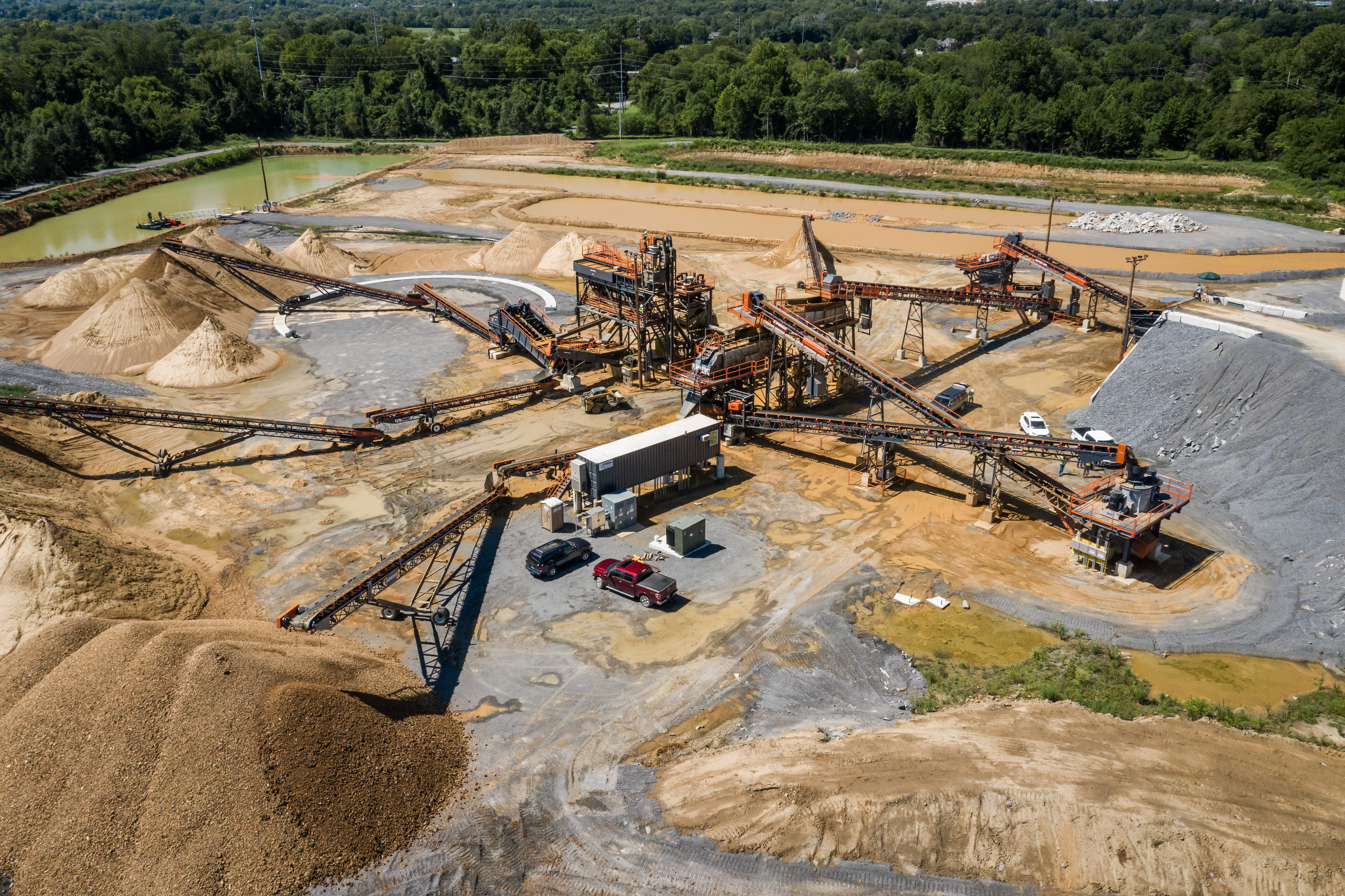
- Company type: Private
- Industry: Manufacturing
- Founded: 1972
- Founder: Neil Schmidgall
- Headquarters: Morris, Minnesota, USA
- Area served: Worldwide
- Key people: Bob Domnick (CEO); Jason Adams (President)
- Products: Crushing Equipment; Screening Equipment; Washing Equipment; Conveying Equipment; Replacement Parts
- Number of employees: 1,600
- Subsidiaries: Westmor Industries
- Website: superior-Ind.com

Superior Industries, Inc. is an American manufacturing company headquartered in Morris, Minnesota. The company engineers, manufactures, sells and supports dry bulk processing and handling equipment and components. In 2008, Superior acquired Westmor Industries, a manufacturer and distributor of energy storage, transportation and dispensing equipment also headquartered in Morris.

Superior traces its roots back to 1917 when Henry Schmidgall began manufacturing concrete products in Hancock, Minnesota. Later, Henry's grandson, Neil Schmidgall, formed Superior Industries, which repaired and manufactured the processing and handling equipment in the quarries that supplied Hancock Concrete.

Today, Superior Industries is the largest employer in Stevens County, Minnesota, and in 2008 was listed among the fastest growing private companies in the United States. While more than half of its 1,600 person workforce is employed at one of two campuses in Stevens County, Minnesota, the other half are spread throughout 25 other manufacturing, engineering or repair center facilities in the United States, Canada and Brazil.

== History ==
- 1917: Henry Schmidgall moves to Hancock, Minnesota to purchase small concrete drain tile manufacturer.
- 1940: Henry's son forms Schmidgall Sand and Gravel from aggregate division of Hancock Concrete.
- 1972: Henry's grandson, Neil Schmidgall, founds Superior Machinery Company after building conveyors and plants for Schmidgall Sand and Gravel.
- 1974: Superior begins manufacturing conveyor idlers after acquiring presses and tooling from Ersham Manufacturing of Enterprise, Kansas.
- 1991: A dedicated facility for conveyors and portable plants is completed moving final assembly indoors for the first time.
- 1994: Superior earns its first patent for development of the FD Series conveyor axle, which reduces conveyor setup time to seconds.
- 1997: After years of research and development, the first TeleStacker® Conveyor debuts. It earns international attention.
- 1999: Astec Industries, a publicly traded company from Chattanooga, Tennessee, acquires Superior. Division headquarters remain in Morris.
- 2001: Superior begins manufacturing conveyor pulleys.
- 2004: A group of employees and local community investors purchase ownership of Superior back from Astec Industries. Superior returns to private ownership.
- 2007: To better serve rapidly growing markets in the Southwest United States and Latin America, Superior expands manufacturing to Prescott Valley, Arizona.
- 2008: Superior acquires fueling equipment manufacturer and distributor Westmor Industries, the second largest company in Morris
- 2008: To better serve stationary plant markets in the Southeast United States, Loganville, Georgia-based Fesco Systems is acquired
- 2014: Superior acquires aggregate washing equipment manufacturer GreyStone, Inc. of Columbus, Nebraska.
- 2015: Superior acquires aggregate crushing and screening manufacturer, Clemro Western of Calgary, Alberta.
- 2015: Superior acquires aggregate plant manufacturer, MFE Manufacturing of Miramichi, New Brunswick.
- 2015: Superior acquires Parcan Group, a Brazilian manufacturer of conveyor idlers and pulleys headquartered in São Paulo.
- 2015: Superior acquires assets of FLSmidth crusher manufacturing plant in Pekin, Illinois.
- 2015: Company Founder, Neil Schmidgall, is inducted into the Pit & Quarry Hall of Fame.
- 2017: Rock Face to Load Out Vision is unveiled to attendees of CONEXPO-CON/AGG. Superior shows the largest new product display in the exhibition’s history.
- 2020: Superior announces partnership with AMPCO Minerals, an engineering and manufacturing company in Shanghai, China. That year, the company debuts 11 new Liberty® Jaw crushers, the Sentry® Horizontal Shaft Impact crusher, Valor® Vertical Shaft Impact crusher, and other products from the Shanghai manufacturer.
- 2023: Acquisition of CEMCO, Inc. -- a VSI crushing manufacturer in Belen, New Mexico -- adds 150,000 square feet of manufacturing to footprint.

== Equipment Division ==
Superior manufactures portable and stationary processing and handling equipment for dry bulk material industries including construction aggregates, mining, concrete, asphalt and recycle industries. The company markets its equipment globally through a network of dealers or direct sales in regions not served by a dealer. Products include crushing, screening, washing, feeding and conveying equipment. Equipment manufacturing locations include the home plant in Morris, Minnesota and satellite plants in Columbus, Nebraska; Prescott Valley, Arizona; Loganville, Georgia; and Miramichi, New Brunswick.

== Components Division ==
Like its equipment, Superior's conveying components serve a variety of industries like construction aggregates and mining. Components are sold through a large, global distribution network. Outside of distributor territories, the company sells its product direct to customers. Products include idlers, pulleys, belt cleaners and conveyor related accessories. Conveyor components are manufactured in Morris, Prescott Valley, Loganville and Brazil.

== Westmor Industries ==
On May 1, 2008, Superior announced its acquisition of Westmor Industries, a manufacturer and distributor of petroleum and liquid-handling equipment. Westmor's corporate headquarters are located in Morris, Minnesota, the same community as Superior's headquarters. Since the acquisition, additional manufacturing and service locations have been added in Baltimore, Brewer, ME, Bridgeville, DE, Colmar, PA, Hugo, MN, Portage, WI and Shawnee, KS.

Westmor manufactures and distributes energy storage, transportation, and dispensing equipment in the following markets: Terminals & Plants, Transport, Storage, Fuel Delivery, Fleets, C-Stores and Aviation.

== Growth ==
In 2007 and again in 2008, Superior was named to Inc. magazine's first ever list of 5000 fastest growing private companies in the United States. In the spring of 2008, The Private Company Index listed Superior one of ten "Top Growth Companies" in the U.S.

The company reports an annual growth rate of more than 15% and currently employs more than 1,600 people.
