= Morris, Minnesota =

City in Minnesota, United States

Morris
- City
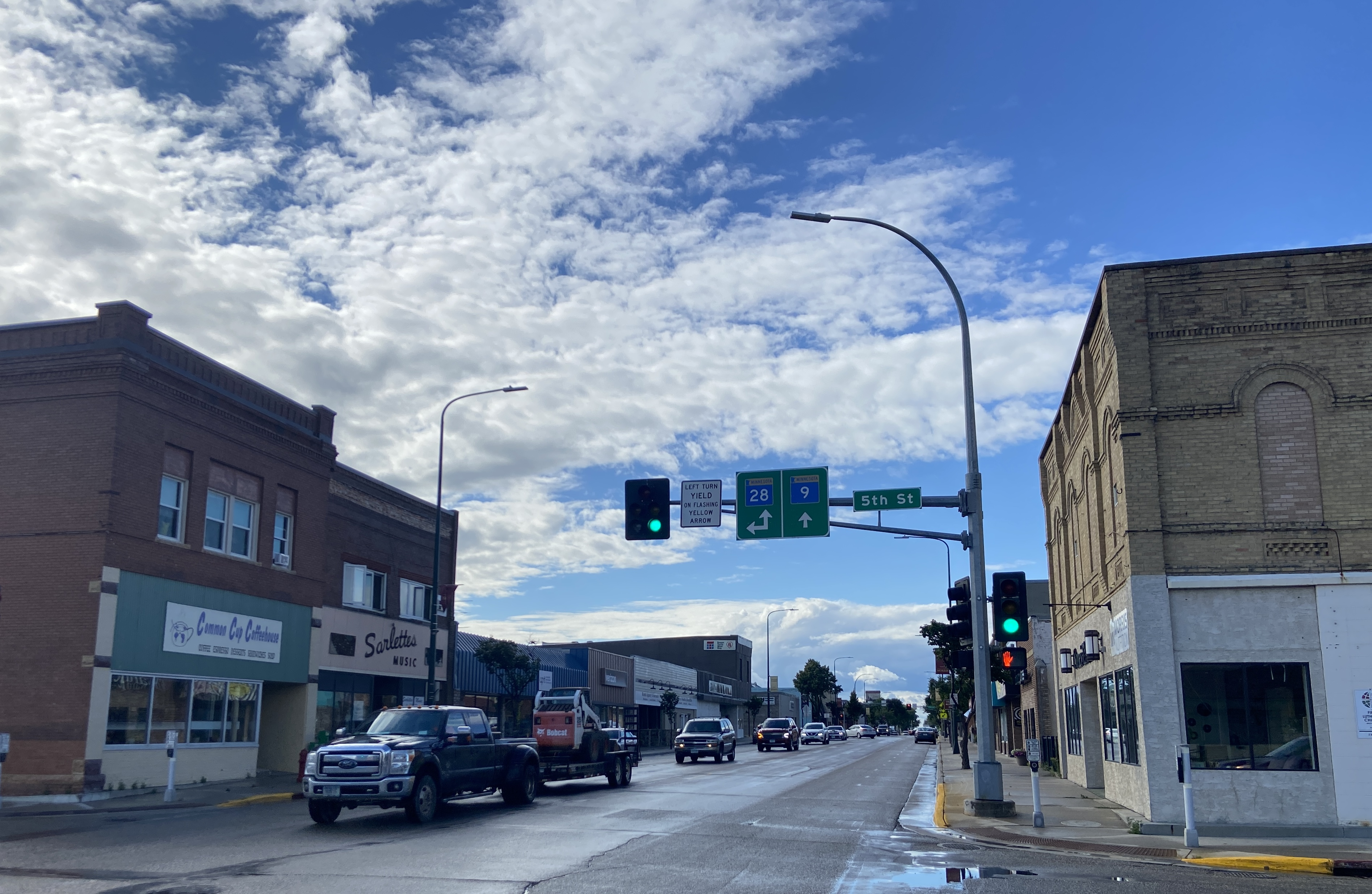
- Atlantic Avenue at 5th Street
- Nickname: Motown
- Mottoes: "It starts here.", "There's More in Morris!"
- Location of Morris within Stevens County and state of Minnesota
- Coordinates: 45°35′08″N 95°54′17″W
- Country: United States
- State: Minnesota
- County: Stevens
- Founded: 1871
- Founder: Charles F. Morris

Government
  - Type: Weak mayor–council
  - Mayor of Morris: Kevin Wohlers

Area
  - Total: 4.90 sq mi (12.70 km^{2})
  - Land: 4.70 sq mi (12.17 km^{2})
  - Water: 0.20 sq mi (0.52 km^{2})
- Elevation: 1,148 ft (350 m)

Population (2020)
  - Total: 5,105
  - Estimate (2021): 5,206
  - Density: 1,086.4/sq mi (419.46/km^{2})
- Time zone: UTC-6 (CST)
  - Summer (DST): UTC-5 (CDT)
- ZIP code: 56267
- Area code: 320
- FIPS code: 27-44242
- GNIS feature ID: 2395408
- Website: ci.morris.mn.us

Morris is a city and the county seat of Stevens County, Minnesota, United States. The population was 5,105 at the 2020 census.

Morris is surrounded by some of the nation's richest agricultural land, and agribusiness is important to the local economy. Headquartered in Morris, Riverview LLP is Minnesota's largest dairy milking operation and one of the largest in the nation. Other large economic contributors are beef feedlots and swine producers, manufacturing, education, and healthcare industries.

The town is home to the University of Minnesota Morris (UMM), part of the University of Minnesota system. It was established as a public college in 1960 on the grounds of a former industrial school for Native Americans. Today the campus has a population of approximately 1,900 and is ranked as a "Top 10 Public Liberal Arts College" by U.S. News & World Report and one of "America's Top Colleges" by Forbes.

== History ==
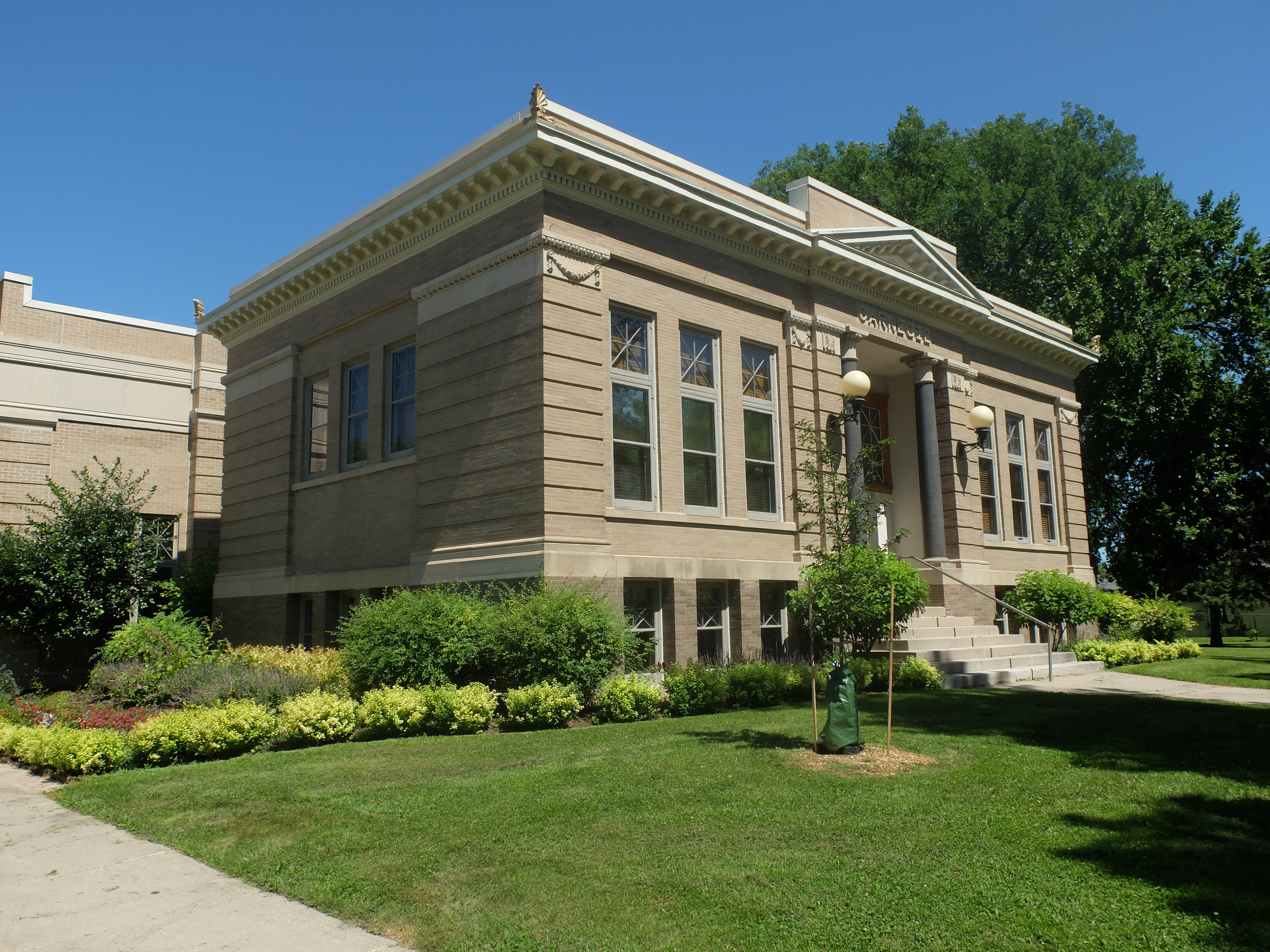
Stevens County Historical Museum, former Carnegie Library

Morris was platted in 1869 and named for Charles F. Morris, a railroad engineer. A post office has been in operation at Morris since 1871, when Morris township was organized. It was incorporated as a village in 1878 and as a city in 1902.

The federal government and state in the 19th century had programs to assimilate Native Americans to the majority culture. The Sisters of Mercy Roman Catholic order, led by Mary Joseph Lynch, established a boarding school for Indians in Morris, operating it from 1887 to 1896 under contract to the federal government. Initially, most students came from the Turtle Mountain Band of Chippewa Indians, which had many Catholic converts. The Morris Industrial School for Indians was to prepare students for jobs in the industrializing culture.

The federal government then appointed staff to manage the school into the early 20th century, before transferring it to the state. After the state took over the school in the early 20th century for general education, it taught agricultural topics. Agriculture has continued to be a major part of the economy. In 1909 the University of Minnesota established the West Central School of Agriculture (WCSA), and Morris closed.

When the state announced a phase-out plan for Morris and similar agricultural schools, a grassroots citizens' movement convinced the state to establish a public college on the Morris campus. In the fall of 1960, the University of Minnesota Morris opened to students seeking a liberal arts education. It has been ranked a "Top 10 Public Liberal Arts College" by U.S. News & World Report and one of "America's Top Colleges" by Forbes.

The city contains five properties listed on the National Register of Historic Places: the 1881 Lewis H. Stanton House, the 1899 Morris Industrial School for Indians Dormitory, the 1905 Morris Carnegie Library, and the early-20th-century West Central School of Agriculture and Experiment Station Historic District. Morris High School, begun in 1914, is also listed, even though it was demolished in 2013.

The 1975 Morris earthquake occurred on July 9, and was the state's largest 20th-century earthquake, rated at 4.6 M_{n}. On June 4, 1993, another quake slightly shook the community. This one measured 4.1 in magnitude and was the third-largest earthquake in Minnesota in the 20th century.

== Geography ==
According to the United States Census Bureau, Morris has an area of 5.02 square miles (13.00 km^{2}); 4.80 square miles (12.43 km^{2}) is land and 0.22 square miles (0.57 km^{2}) is water. Lake Crystal is in the southwestern part of town; the Pomme de Terre River flows through the town's eastern extremity. U.S. Highway 59 and Minnesota State Highways 9 and 28 are three of the main routes in the town.

=== Climate ===
According to the Köppen Climate Classification system, Morris has a warm-summer humid continental climate, abbreviated "Dfb" on climate maps. The hottest temperature recorded in Morris was 109 °F (42.8 °C) on July 18, 1940, while the coldest temperature recorded was −41 °F (−40.6 °C) on February 16, 1936.

Climate data for Morris, Minnesota (West Central Research and Outreach Center), 1991–2020 normals, extremes 1886–present
Month	Jan	Feb	Mar	Apr	May	Jun	Jul	Aug	Sep	Oct	Nov	Dec	Year
Record high °F (°C)	60 (16)	60 (16)	83 (28)	98 (37)	106 (41)	104 (40)	109 (43)	104 (40)	106 (41)	93 (34)	80 (27)	69 (21)	109 (43)
Mean maximum °F (°C)	40.6 (4.8)	43.5 (6.4)	59.3 (15.2)	77.4 (25.2)	89.0 (31.7)	92.1 (33.4)	91.7 (33.2)	89.9 (32.2)	87.5 (30.8)	81.8 (27.7)	61.7 (16.5)	44.4 (6.9)	94.9 (34.9)
Mean daily maximum °F (°C)	19.2 (−7.1)	23.5 (−4.7)	36.4 (2.4)	52.9 (11.6)	67.5 (19.7)	77.1 (25.1)	80.7 (27.1)	78.9 (26.1)	71.9 (22.2)	56.5 (13.6)	39.0 (3.9)	25.0 (−3.9)	52.4 (11.3)
Daily mean °F (°C)	9.8 (−12.3)	13.8 (−10.1)	27.3 (−2.6)	42.4 (5.8)	56.3 (13.5)	66.8 (19.3)	70.3 (21.3)	67.9 (19.9)	59.9 (15.5)	45.5 (7.5)	30.0 (−1.1)	16.6 (−8.6)	42.2 (5.7)
Mean daily minimum °F (°C)	0.5 (−17.5)	4.1 (−15.5)	18.2 (−7.7)	31.9 (−0.1)	45.2 (7.3)	56.4 (13.6)	59.9 (15.5)	56.9 (13.8)	47.9 (8.8)	34.6 (1.4)	21.0 (−6.1)	8.1 (−13.3)	32.1 (0.0)
Mean minimum °F (°C)	−20.8 (−29.3)	−16.7 (−27.1)	−5.3 (−20.7)	18.0 (−7.8)	31.5 (−0.3)	44.8 (7.1)	49.0 (9.4)	45.3 (7.4)	32.3 (0.2)	20.2 (−6.6)	2.5 (−16.4)	−14.6 (−25.9)	−24.2 (−31.2)
Record low °F (°C)	−40 (−40)	−41 (−41)	−30 (−34)	−2 (−19)	18 (−8)	27 (−3)	38 (3)	31 (−1)	20 (−7)	1 (−17)	−27 (−33)	−34 (−37)	−41 (−41)
Average precipitation inches (mm)	0.72 (18)	0.74 (19)	1.20 (30)	2.24 (57)	3.10 (79)	4.38 (111)	4.25 (108)	3.46 (88)	2.68 (68)	2.44 (62)	0.99 (25)	0.75 (19)	26.95 (684)
Average snowfall inches (cm)	9.1 (23)	9.0 (23)	6.9 (18)	4.5 (11)	0.0 (0.0)	0.0 (0.0)	0.0 (0.0)	0.0 (0.0)	0.0 (0.0)	1.0 (2.5)	5.2 (13)	8.9 (23)	44.6 (113.5)
Average extreme snow depth inches (cm)	10.8 (27)	12.4 (31)	11.3 (29)	3.6 (9.1)	0.0 (0.0)	0.0 (0.0)	0.0 (0.0)	0.0 (0.0)	0.0 (0.0)	0.5 (1.3)	3.3 (8.4)	7.3 (19)	15.1 (38)
Average precipitation days (≥ 0.01 in)	7.4	7.1	7.6	8.4	11.1	11.7	11.0	9.6	9.0	9.0	5.7	7.7	105.3
Average snowy days (≥ 0.1 in)	8.7	7.7	4.9	2.1	0.0	0.0	0.0	0.0	0.0	0.7	4.0	8.2	36.3
Source 1: NOAA
Source 2: National Weather Service

== Demographics ==
Historical population
Census	Pop.	Note	%±
1880	743		—
1890	1,266		70.4%
1900	1,934		52.8%
1910	1,685		−12.9%
1920	2,320		37.7%
1930	2,474		6.6%
1940	3,214		29.9%
1950	3,811		18.6%
1960	4,199		10.2%
1970	5,366		27.8%
1980	5,367		0.0%
1990	5,613		4.6%
2000	5,068		−9.7%
2010	5,286		4.3%
2020	5,105		−3.4%
2021 (est.)	5,206		2.0%
U.S. Decennial Census; 2020 Census

=== 2020 census ===
As of the 2020 census, Morris had a population of 5,105. The median age was 30.5 years. 20.1% of residents were under the age of 18 and 16.5% of residents were 65 years of age or older. For every 100 females there were 90.9 males, and for every 100 females age 18 and over there were 86.7 males age 18 and over.

98.0% of residents lived in urban areas, while 2.0% lived in rural areas.

There were 1,993 households in Morris, of which 25.4% had children under the age of 18 living in them. Of all households, 41.2% were married-couple households, 22.1% were households with a male householder and no spouse or partner present, and 31.0% were households with a female householder and no spouse or partner present. About 39.3% of all households were made up of individuals and 15.6% had someone living alone who was 65 years of age or older.

There were 2,318 housing units, of which 14.0% were vacant. The homeowner vacancy rate was 4.1% and the rental vacancy rate was 16.0%.

Racial composition as of the 2020 census
Race	Number	Percent
White	4,163	81.5%
Black or African American	77	1.5%
American Indian and Alaska Native	144	2.8%
Asian	58	1.1%
Native Hawaiian and Other Pacific Islander	1	0.0%
Some other race	333	6.5%
Two or more races	329	6.4%
Hispanic or Latino (of any race)	607	11.9%

=== 2010 census ===
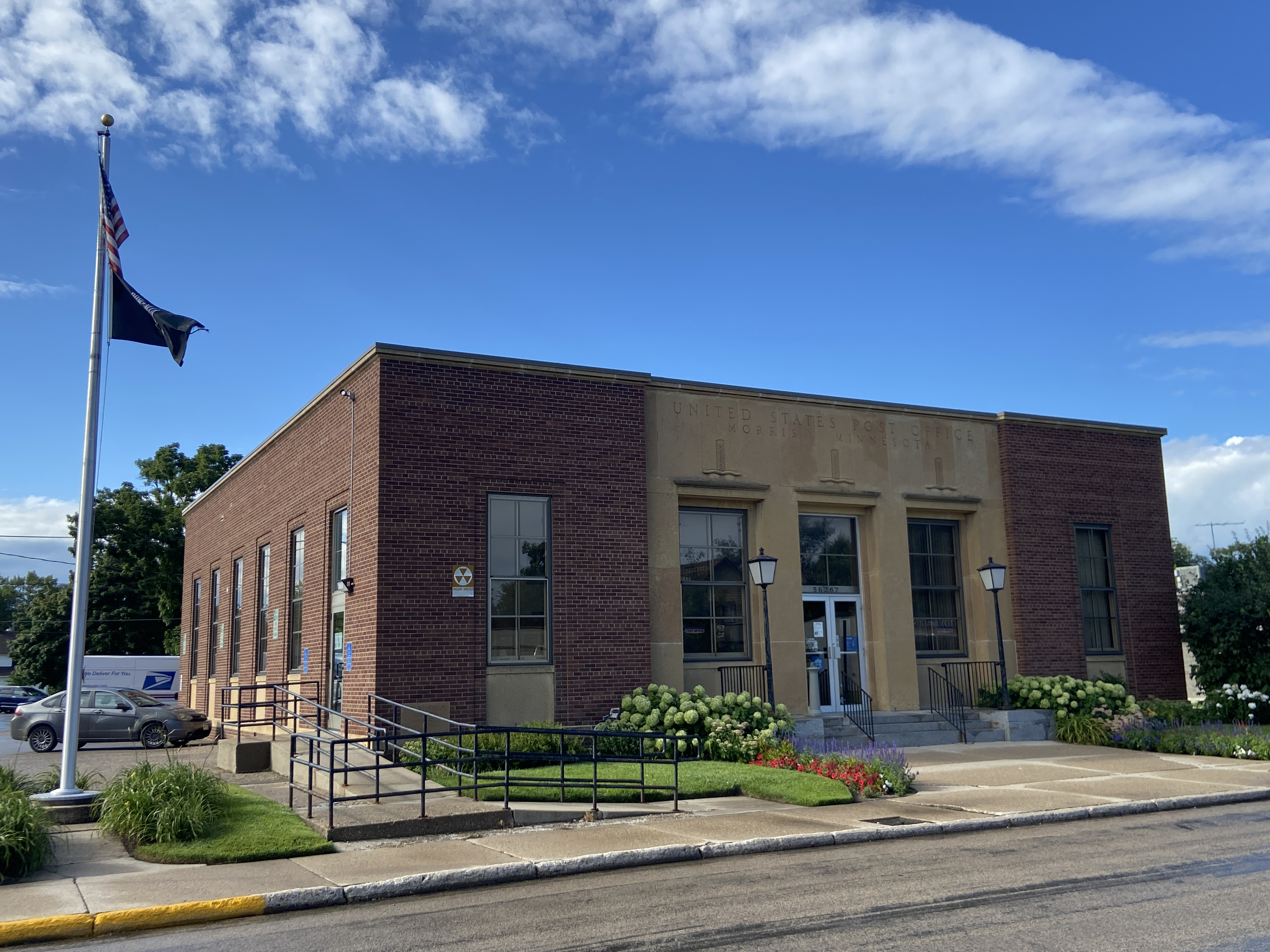
Post Office

As of the census of 2010, there were 5,286 people, 1,986 households, and 1,021 families residing in the city. The population density was 1,101.3 inhabitants per square mile (425.2/km^{2}). There were 2,199 housing units at an average density of 458.1 units per square mile (176.9 units/km^{2}). The racial makeup of the city was 90.9% White, 1.3% African American, 1.5% Native American, 2.5% Asian, 0.1% Pacific Islander, 1.1% from other races, and 2.6% from two or more races. Hispanic or Latino of any race were 3.2% of the population.

There were 1,986 households, of which 23.6% had children under age 18 living with them, 41.7% were married couples living together, 7.3% had a female householder with no husband present, 2.4% had a male householder with no wife present, and 48.6% were non-families. 35.9% of all households were made up of individuals, and 16.4% had someone living alone who was 65 or older. The average household size was 2.23 and the average family size was 2.87.

The median age in the city was 26.5. 17.7% of residents were under 18; 30.8% were between 18 and 24; 17.4% were from 25 to 44; 18.1% were from 45 to 64; and 16.1% were 65 or older. The gender makeup of the city was 46.6% male and 53.4% female.

=== 2000 census ===
As of the census of 2000, there were 5,068 people, 1,929 households, and 985 families residing in Morris. The population density was 1,183.2 inhabitants per square mile (456.8/km^{2}). There were 2,067 housing units at an average density of 482.6 units per square mile (186.3 units/km^{2}). The town's racial makeup was 93.63% White, 1.76% African American, 1.22% Native American, 1.54% Asian, 0.02% Pacific Islander, 0.63% from other races, and 1.20% from two or more races. Hispanic or Latino of any race were 1.48% of the population.

There were 1,929 households, of which 23.4% had children under 18 living with them, 42.0% were married couples living together, 6.8% had a female householder with no husband present, and 48.9% were non-families. 36.9% of all households were made up of individuals, and 17.7% had someone living alone who was 65 or older. The average household size was 2.20 and the average family size was 2.84.

In the town the population was spread out, with 16.7% under 18, 34.2% from 18 to 24, 19.0% from 25 to 44, 13.9% from 45 to 64, and 16.2% who were 65 or older. The median age was 24. For every 100 females, there were 85.9 males. For every 100 females 18 and over, there were 82.6 males.

The median income for a household in the town was $31,786, and the median income for a family was $46,556. Males had a median income of $34,323 versus $22,338 for females. The per capita income was $16,607. About 8.4% of families and 22.4% of the population were below the poverty line, including 9.6% of those under 18 and 14.9% of those 65 or over.

== Politics ==
Presidential election results 1960–2024

Precinct General Election Results
Year	Republican	Democratic	Third parties
2024	49.4% 1,262	48.5% 1,238	2.0% 52
2020	45.7% 1,150	51.5% 1,297	2.8% 70
2016	37.5% 1,090	52.5% 1,527	10.0% 290
2012	36.8% 1,169	59.9% 1,899	3.3% 105
2008	36.4% 1,123	60.8% 1,877	2.8% 86
2004	40.3% 1,259	57.9% 1,810	1.8% 56
2000	39.0% 1,185	50.2% 1,527	10.8% 327
1996	36.4% 932	55.5% 1,420	8.1% 207
1992	32.8% 990	50.6% 1,528	16.6% 502
1988	43.6% 1,160	56.4% 1,503	0.0% 0
1984	50.1% 1,392	49.9% 1,386	0.0% 0
1980	42.7% 1,335	46.8% 1,463	10.5% 326
1976	42.0% 1,174	55.8% 1,562	2.2% 62
1972	46.0% 1,356	52.5% 1,548	1.5% 45
1968	51.5% 1,148	45.2% 1,008	3.3% 74
1964	44.4% 961	55.5% 1,201	0.1% 3
1960	57.5% 1,211	42.4% 893	0.1% 3

== Economy ==
Agribusiness contributes to the economy, as the region is still mostly rural. The state university is a major employer at its three facilities.

Manufacturer Superior Industries employs about 800 people at its two plants in town. A majority of Superior's workforce is skilled in engineering or fabrication. The company manufactures steel conveyors and storage tanks for industries handling dry bulk, fuels and gases. In 2008, Inc. magazine ranked Superior Industries as one of the fastest-growing private companies in the United States.

== Higher education ==
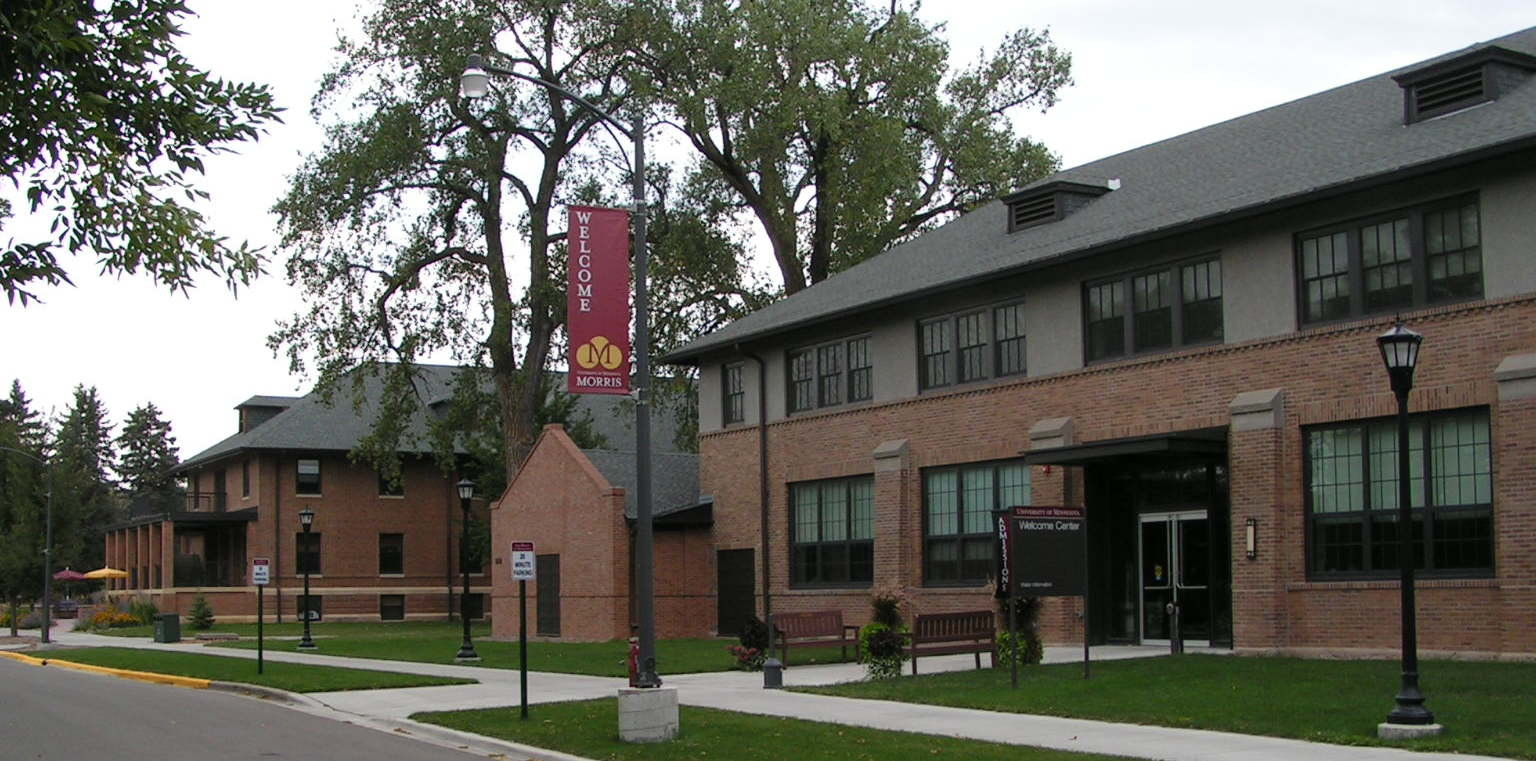
West Central School of Agriculture

The University of Minnesota Morris (UMM) is one of five campuses in the University of Minnesota system. It was established as a public college in 1960, on the grounds of the Morris Industrial School for Indians, which had also operated as an agricultural school. UMM has an enrollment of about 1,900 students and 145 teaching faculty. Some 61 students made up the first graduating class in 1961. Since then, Morris has conferred more than 10,000 degrees.

Morris is home to the West Central Research and Outreach Center, a division of the greater University of Minnesota's College of Food, Agricultural and Natural Resource Sciences. WCROC's faculty and staff study agronomy, soil science, livestock, horticulture, renewable energy and swine production.

WCROC is home to the University of Minnesota's Horticulture Gardens. During the last decade, the privately funded research gardens have gained increasing popularity. Their design has increased in aesthetic appeal while maintaining a research base. Each summer, the gardens are host to thousands of visitors.

== Prairie Pioneer Days ==
Prairie Pioneer Days is a family festival hosted by the Morris Area Chamber of Commerce every July, which celebrates European-American settlement in the area. It includes many activities around town, including a parade, fireworks, and food and craft vendors. Since the late 20th century, festival organizers have also worked to include Native American participants and acknowledge contributions by their cultures.

== Stevens County Fair ==
The Stevens County Fair takes place in Morris on the second full weekend in August. It is known for entertainment, 4-H events and family time. Each year people from miles around come to see the exhibits, take in some entertainment in the grandstand and see old friends while sitting on one of many benches in the shade.

== Media ==
Four radio stations cover Morris; KMRS AM 1230, KKOK FM 95.7, and KRVY FM 97.3, all owned by Iowa City Broadcasting Company, Inc., and KUMM FM 89.7, operated by the University of Minnesota Morris.

The Stevens County Times, a Forum Communications newspaper, publishes on Saturdays. It traces its roots to 1882.

== Transportation ==
The city owns and operates the Morris Municipal Airport. Until October 1979, Morris was served by passenger rail at the Morris station.

== Notable people ==
- Adele Watson (1890–1933), silent film actress
- Gustav A. Anderson (1893–1983), Minnesota state legislator and farmer
- Dick Grace (1898–1965), Hollywood stunt pilot
- Jim Hall, Free software advocate, best known for FreeDOS
- Shirley A. Hokanson, Minnesota state legislator and social worker
- Edwin J. Jones, Minnesota state legislator and businessman
- Mike Morley, former professional golfer
- PZ Myers, biologist and blogger
- Zach Witt, former professional American football quarterback in the German Football League
- Trina Radke, Olympic swimmer
- Aaron Schock, former United States Representative from Illinois (2009–2015)
- Royal A. Stone, Minnesota Supreme Court justice
- Robert Ernest Strand, Minnesota state legislator and farmer
- Brett Winkelman, former professional basketball player
- Children 18:3, Christian punk rock band

== Gallery ==
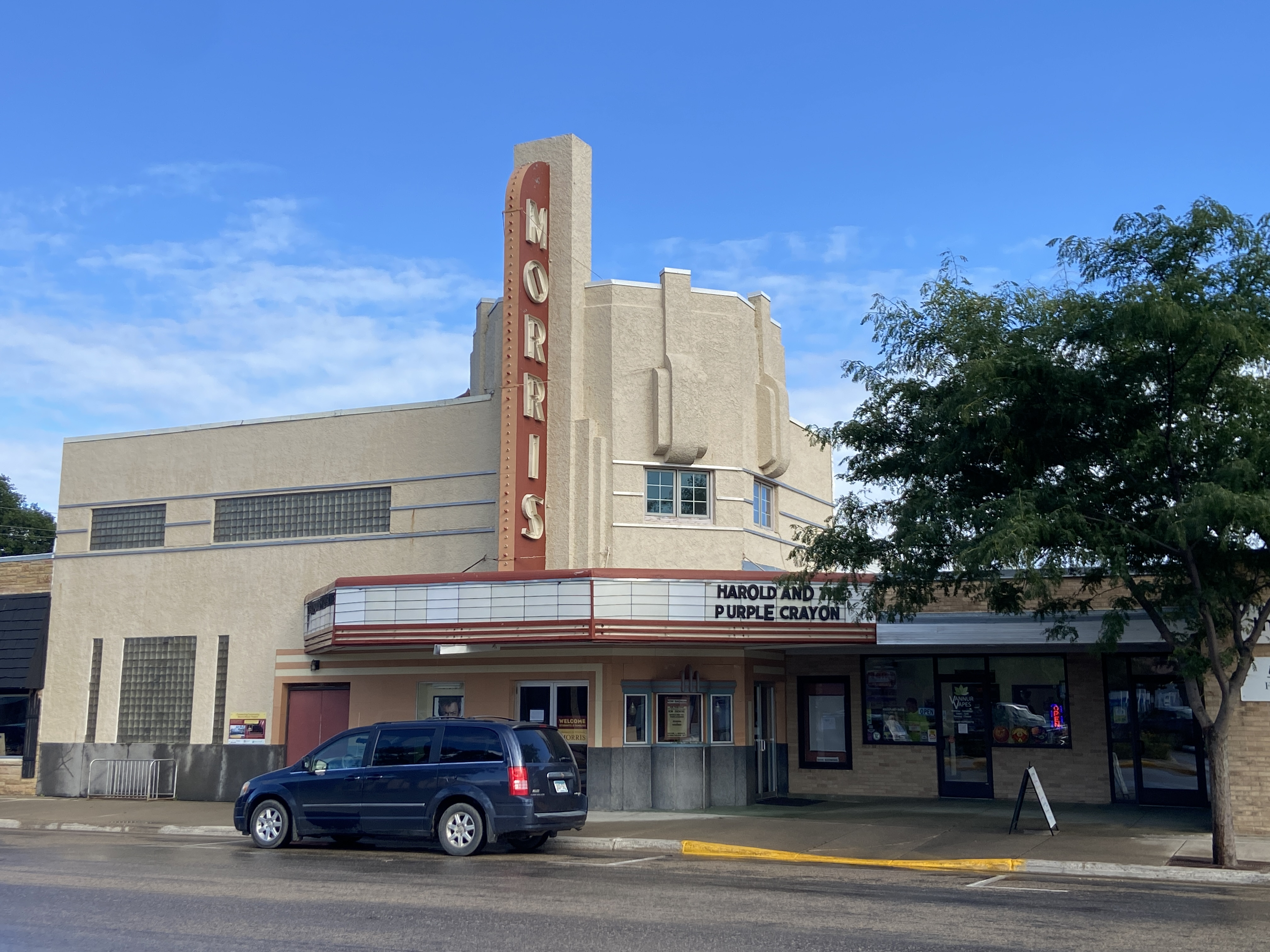
Morris Theater

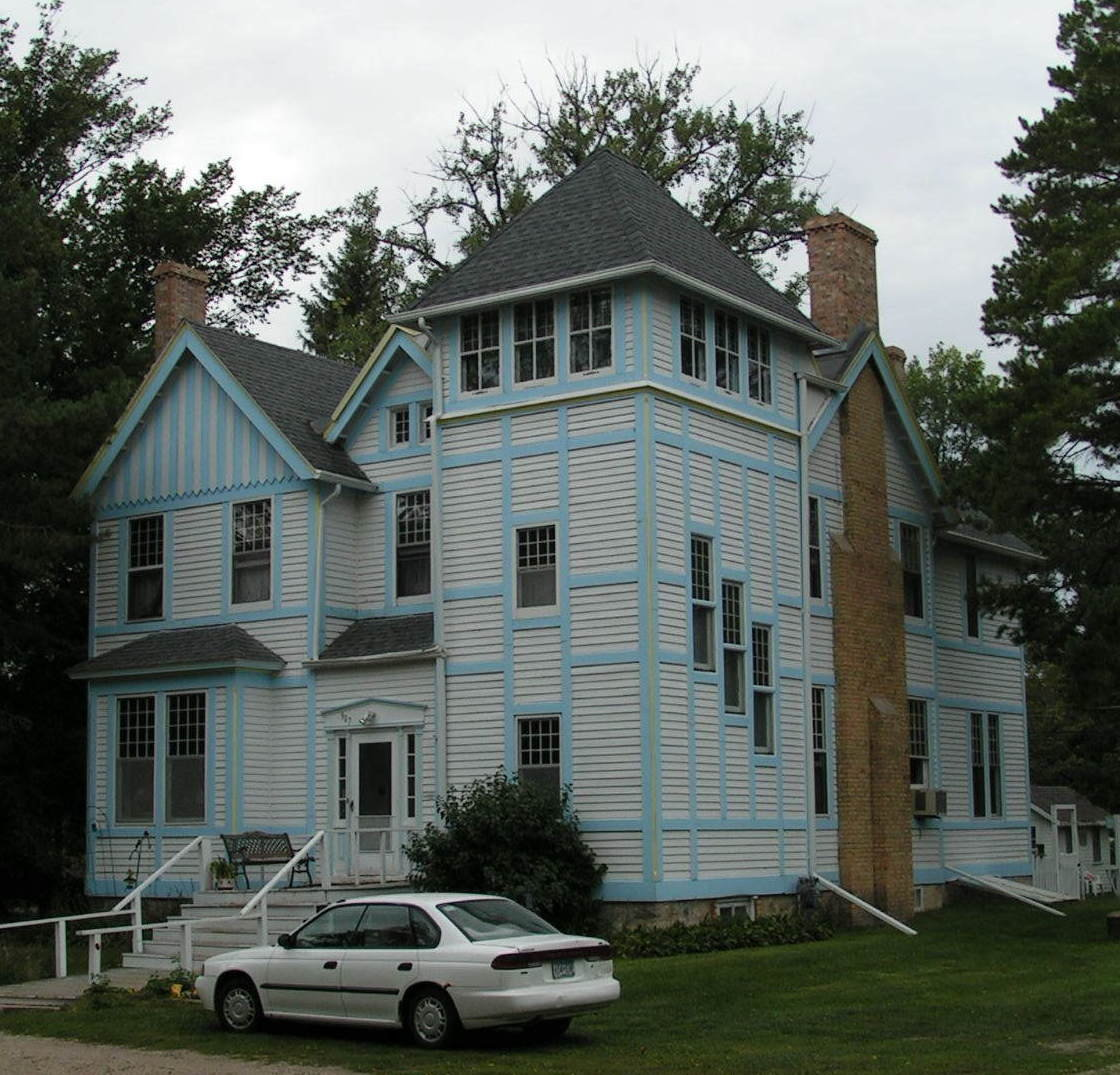
Lewis H Stanton House

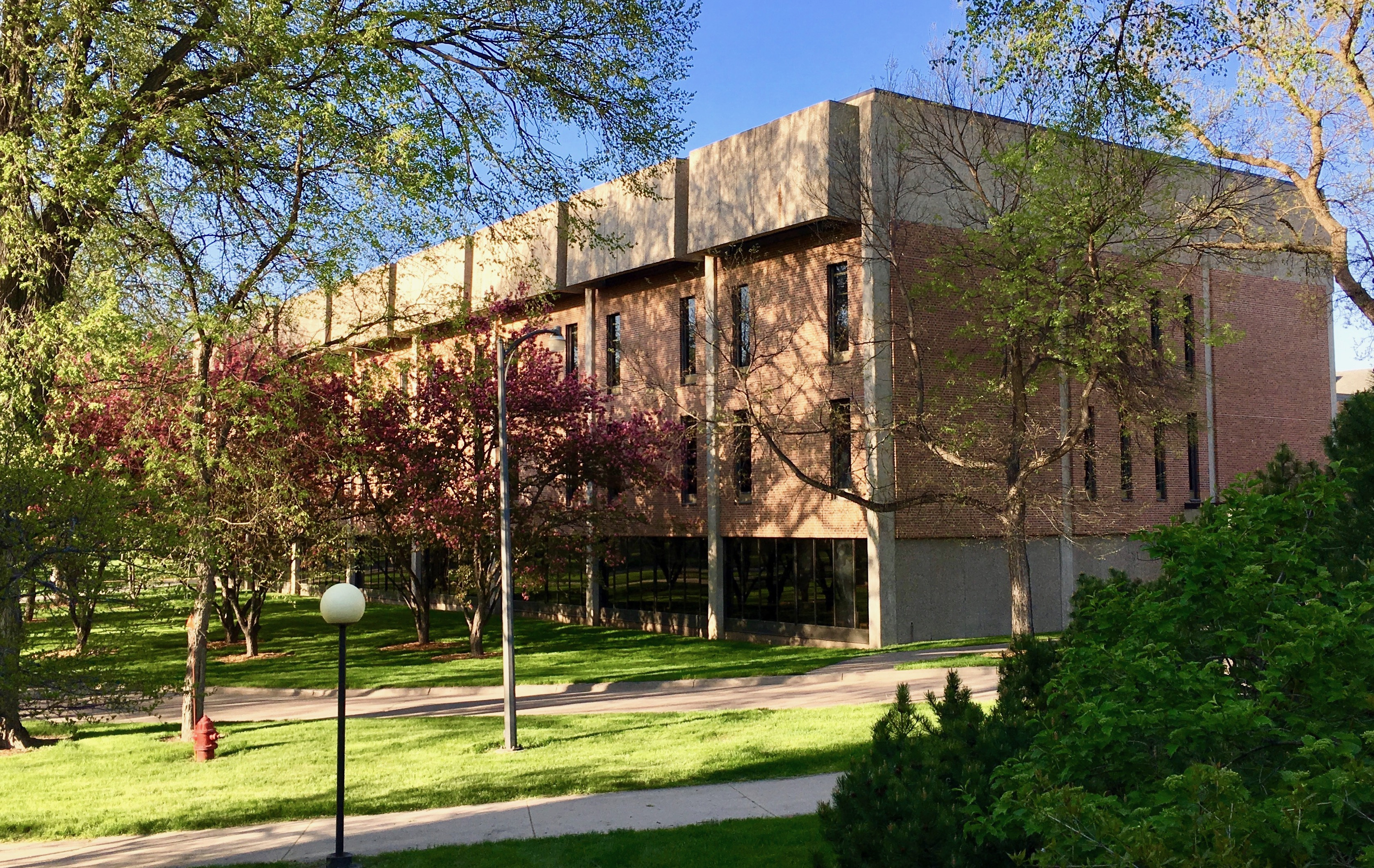
Briggs Library, University of Minnesota-Morris
