= Lewis H. Stanton House =

Historic house in Minnesota, United States

- U.S. National Register of Historic Places
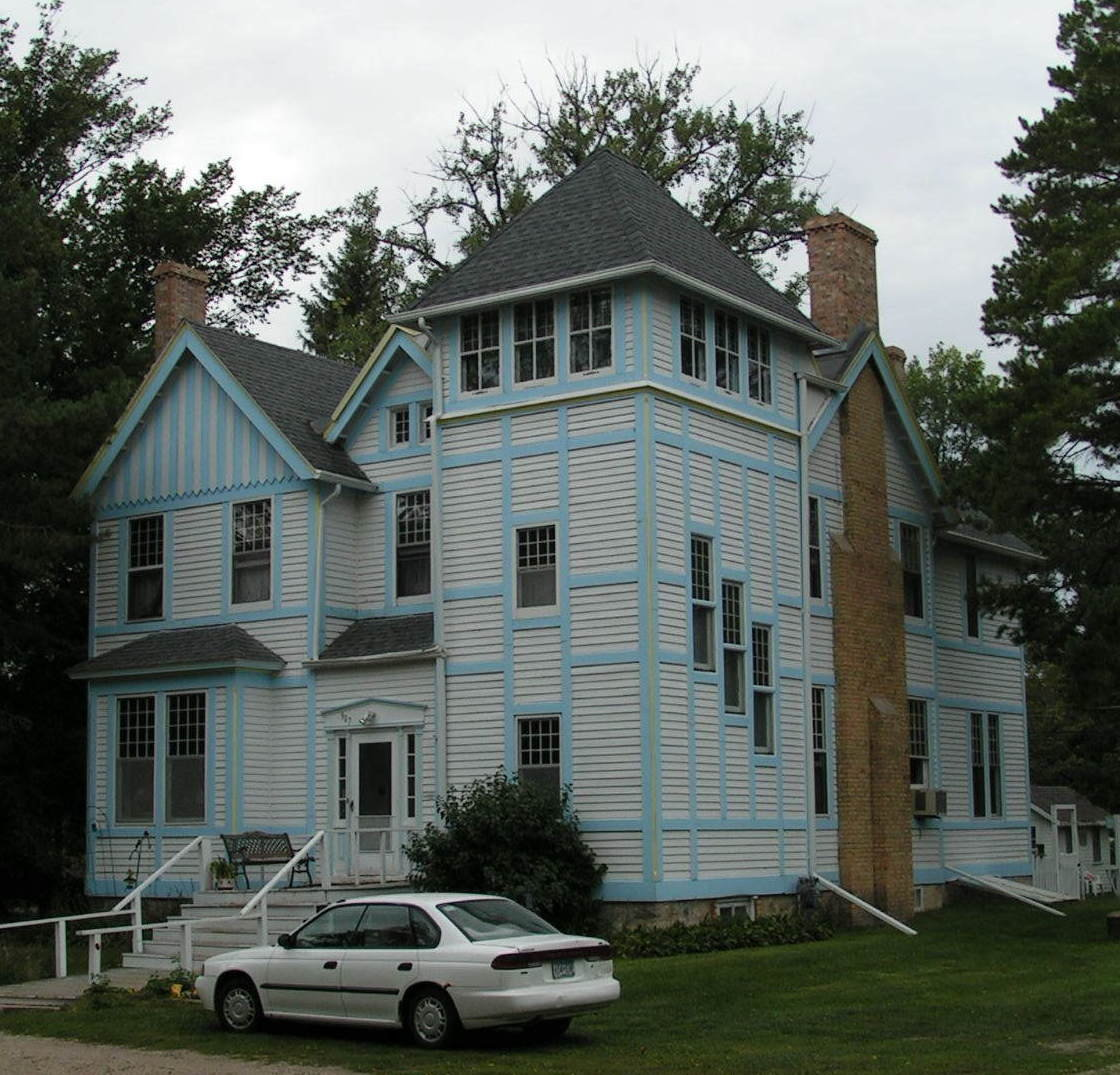
- The Lewis H. Stanton House from the northeast

- Location within Minnesota Location within the United States
- Location: 907 Park Street, Morris, Minnesota
- Coordinates: 45°35′14.5″N 95°55′26.5″W
- Area: Less than one acre
- Built: 1881
- Architect: William Bailey & Harvey Page
- Architectural style: Stick/Eastlake
- NRHP reference No.: 82003060
- Designated: August 19, 1982

The Lewis H. Stanton House, nicknamed "The Chimneys", is a historic house in Morris, Minnesota, United States, built in 1881. It was listed on the National Register of Historic Places in 1982 for having local significance in the theme of architecture. It was nominated for its Stick–Eastlake architecture and prominence among the housing stock of Morris.

== History ==
Lewis H. Stanton (1860–1938) was the son of Edwin Stanton, who served in Cabinet-level positions with presidents James Buchanan, Abraham Lincoln, and Andrew Johnson. The younger Stanton moved from Washington D.C. to Minnesota for health reasons, and had this house constructed for himself by a former East Coast schoolmate. Stanton left Morris around 1890, moving with his family to New Orleans, where he spent the rest of his life.

== See also ==
- National Register of Historic Places listings in Stevens County, Minnesota
