= Morris Industrial School for Indians =

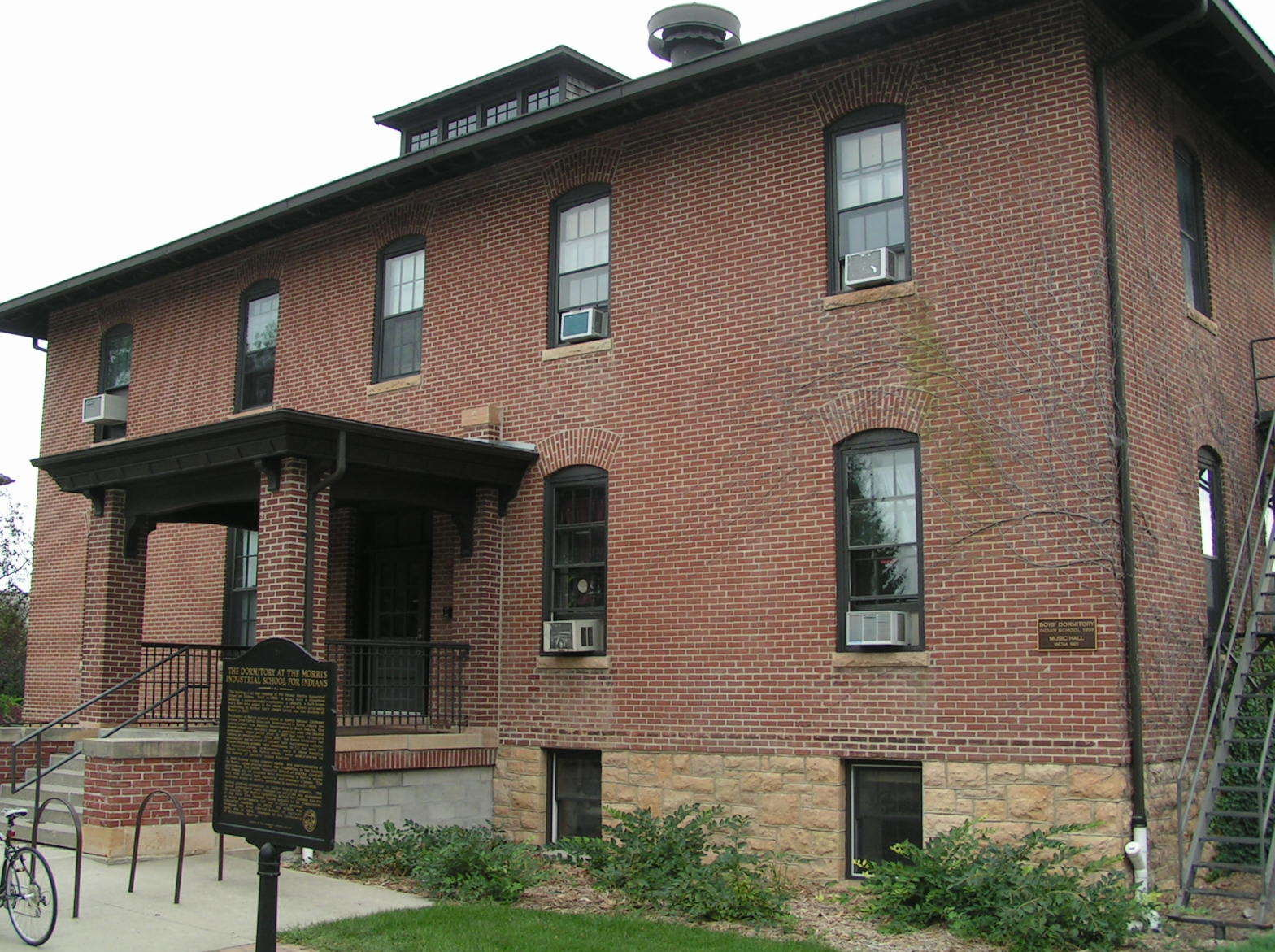
- Dormitory of the Morris Industrial School for Indians today on the campus of University of Minnesota Morris

Location
- Morris, Minnesota; United States; 45°35′23″N 95°54′10″W

Information
- School type: Native American boarding school
- Founded: 1887
- Status: Closed
- Closed: 1909
- Grades: Kindergarten–Eighth
- Enrollment: 100–160
- Nickname: Morris Indian School
- Morris Industrial School for Indians Dormitory
- U.S. National Register of Historic Places
- U.S. Historic district – Contributing property
- Location: 600 East 4th Street, Morris, Minnesota
- Coordinates: 45°35′20.8″N 95°54′4.7″W
- Area: Less than one acre
- Built: 1899
- Part of: West Central School of Agriculture and Experiment Station Historic District (ID02001707)
- NRHP reference No.: 84001696

Significant dates
- Added to NRHP: May 10, 1984
- Designated CP: January 15, 2003

The Morris Industrial School for Indians (1887–1909) was a Native American boarding school in Morris, Minnesota, United States. The school was founded and run by Roman Catholic nuns of the Sisters of Mercy order from 1887 until 1896. After that, the school was run by the Office of Indian Affairs of the United States Federal Government from 1898 until 1909.

When the government took over operation of the school in 1898, they instituted a "progressive education," including music programs, a literary society, and a baseball team. In 1910, the school was transferred to the state. It was adapted for use as an agricultural high school operated by the University of Minnesota system. When it was to be superseded, a grassroots effort gained establishment of a public college at this campus: the University of Minnesota Morris opened in 1960.

The only building from the Morris Indian School that survives in its original location is an 1899 dormitory. It is listed on the National Register of Historic Places. It has been adapted to serve as the university's Multi-Ethnic Resource Center.

== Founding ==
The Morris Industrial School for Indians was founded in 1887 by a group of nuns from the Sisters of Mercy order under the leadership of Mary Joseph Lynch. Lynch had served with Florence Nightingale during the Crimean War before starting industrial schools for youth in the United States. The parish priest of Morris, Minnesota, invited the order led by Lynch to start a parochial school for girls in the town. The order wanted to focus on education for Native Americans. In 1886 they received a contract by the U.S. to staff a school to those ends. They named the new school the Sacred Heart Indian Mission and constructed the first buildings themselves.

Recruiting students from the Indian reservations was difficult for Lynch until she developed connections with the Turtle Mountain Band of Chippewa Indians. It had a high percentage of members converted to Catholicism. The number of students, instructors, and buildings slowly increased for the first few years of the school. By 1895, the staff size was 25 (24 nuns and 1 male supervisor) and the enrollment was 103 students; it was the largest Indian boarding school in Minnesota. Lynch maintained traditional practices and curriculum of a largely parochial education; however, unlike some other Catholic boarding schools, she did not allow corporal punishment.

== Federal administration ==
A gradual change in contract policy at the Office of Indian Affairs (now Bureau of Indian Affairs), essentially ending contracts to parochial schools, resulted in a gradual decrease in resources for the school. The government ended its contract on July 1, 1896. Lynch was deeply disappointed, writing that year: "I am so disappointed words cannot express it...I meant to live till I die working for the Indians....But God, I suppose, wills otherwise."

The Office of Indian Affairs agreed to purchase the school, as it intended to take over operations from the Sisters of Mercy, but paid only half the price they asked. The Commissioner Daniel M. Browning offered the job of transitional superintendent to Lynch, but withdrew it and appointed William H. Johnson. The new school opened in 1898.

Johnson expanded the school and introduced "progressive education" under new federal recommendations. Academic instruction at the school included education from kindergarten until the eighth grade. The school integrated music programs, increased athletics, and started a literary society. Brick buildings replaced the wood ones constructed by the Sisters. A physical plant and sewage system were constructed, and the government acquired significant farmland for agricultural education at the school, as the region was primarily rural. Although Turtle Mountain Chippewa were prominent at the school, the majority of students came from other Ojibwe reservations.

Under pressure to maintain enrollment numbers, Johnson took extraordinary measures to keep students at the school. He extended the length of terms, refused to release students for vacation, and used school staff to forcibly bring students back who had left the institution (sometimes for other boarding schools). Complaints from tribes and other educators were regular as a result of these practices. Johnson also recruited students without verifying Native American ancestry; he accepted some whites who were trying to get a free education. Johnson was fired in 1901 and replaced by John B. Brown.

Brown had a similar progressive curriculum but did not keep as tight control. Average attendance stood at around 160 students for most of Brown's term. On April 30, 1908, Congress authorized the Indian Appropriations Act, which reduced the number of federal Indian boarding schools in favor of schools located on Native American reservations. Native Americans had repeatedly asked for this to keep their families and communities together.

The Morris Industrial School for Indians was selected as one of five schools to be transferred to state governments to be used for education of whites in exchange for the state offering free education to Native Americans. The school was transferred from federal to state control on December 9, 1908 and was authorized by legislation of Congress in March the next year. The Morris Industrial School for Indians closed in June 1909.

== Baseball team ==
With the "progressive education" efforts of Johnson and Brown, athletics and sports were integrated into the curriculum for all students. As was common around the country at the time, the main organized athletics was baseball. A quickly organized team played similar aged opponents from the town of Morris in the late 1890s. Starting in 1901, they began to play a number of high school baseball teams from the area and gained some notice in the local newspapers (which hesitantly covered the team's play). However, because of budget constraints, the team did not have coaches and learned most of their skills from one another.

They became a prominent regional team from 1905 until 1907 stringing together victories against many of the high schools in the region. The 1908 season though saw them defeat many of the best teams in the area. The team won a four-team tournament to start the season and then defeated the Wahpeton High School team, labelled the "champions among the high school teams of North Dakota." That season they went 11-1 beating Wahpeton twice and the Morris High School team, leading to the newspapers anointing the team as "champions of this part of the state."

Many players went on to careers in barnstorming baseball teams or various minor league teams. The player to have the most prominent career in baseball was 1904 graduate Charles Robert Roy (a member of the White Earth Band of Ojibwe). After graduating from Morris, Charlie Roy went to pitch for the Carlisle Indian Industrial School for two years and then signed a professional contract with the Philadelphia Phillies. Roy pitched eight games for the Phillies during the 1906 season and then played for a number of minor league teams.

== Legacy ==
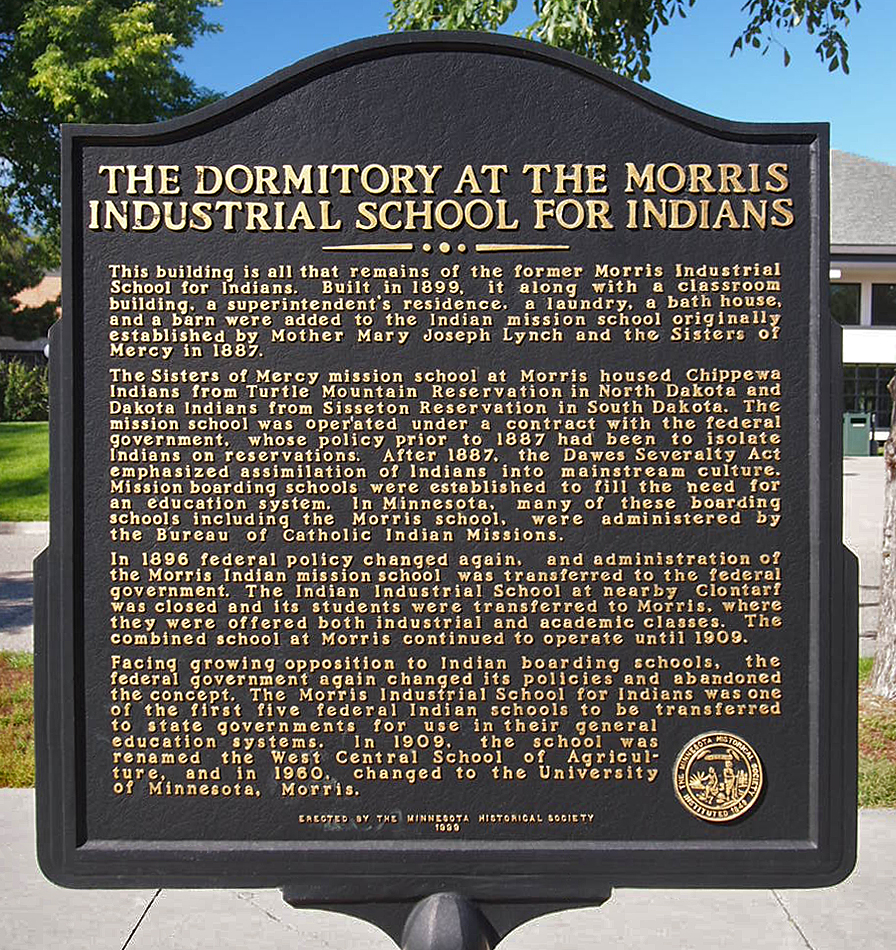
Plaque at dormitory of Morris Industrial School for Indians

The State of Minnesota repurposed the facility as the West Central School of Agriculture in 1910. It operated as a residential agricultural high school under the University of Minnesota system. In 1960, as part of a university reorganization, the campus became the University of Minnesota Morris.

Two buildings survive from the Morris Industrial School for Indians. A wood-frame house built for the school superintendent in 1905 was moved off-campus in 1937 and now stands at 540 West 5th Street. The other, an 1899 boys' dormitory, remains in its original location. The Morris Industrial School for Indians Dormitory was listed on the National Register of Historic Places in 1984 for having local significance in the themes of education, politics/government, and social history. It was nominated for its association with late-19th-century federal Indian policy, which the Dawes Act of 1887 shifted from isolating native people on reservations to a practice of cultural assimilation. When the campus became the West Central School of Agriculture, the building continued to serve as a dormitory for a few years but was converted to the Music Hall for most of the school's 50-year existence. When a historic district of surviving West Central School buildings was added to the National Register in 2002, the 1899 dormitory/music hall was listed as a contributing property. It now serves as the University of Minnesota Morris's Multi-Ethnic Resource Center.

== See also ==
- National Register of Historic Places listings in Stevens County, Minnesota
