= Shirley A. Hokanson =

American politician and social worker

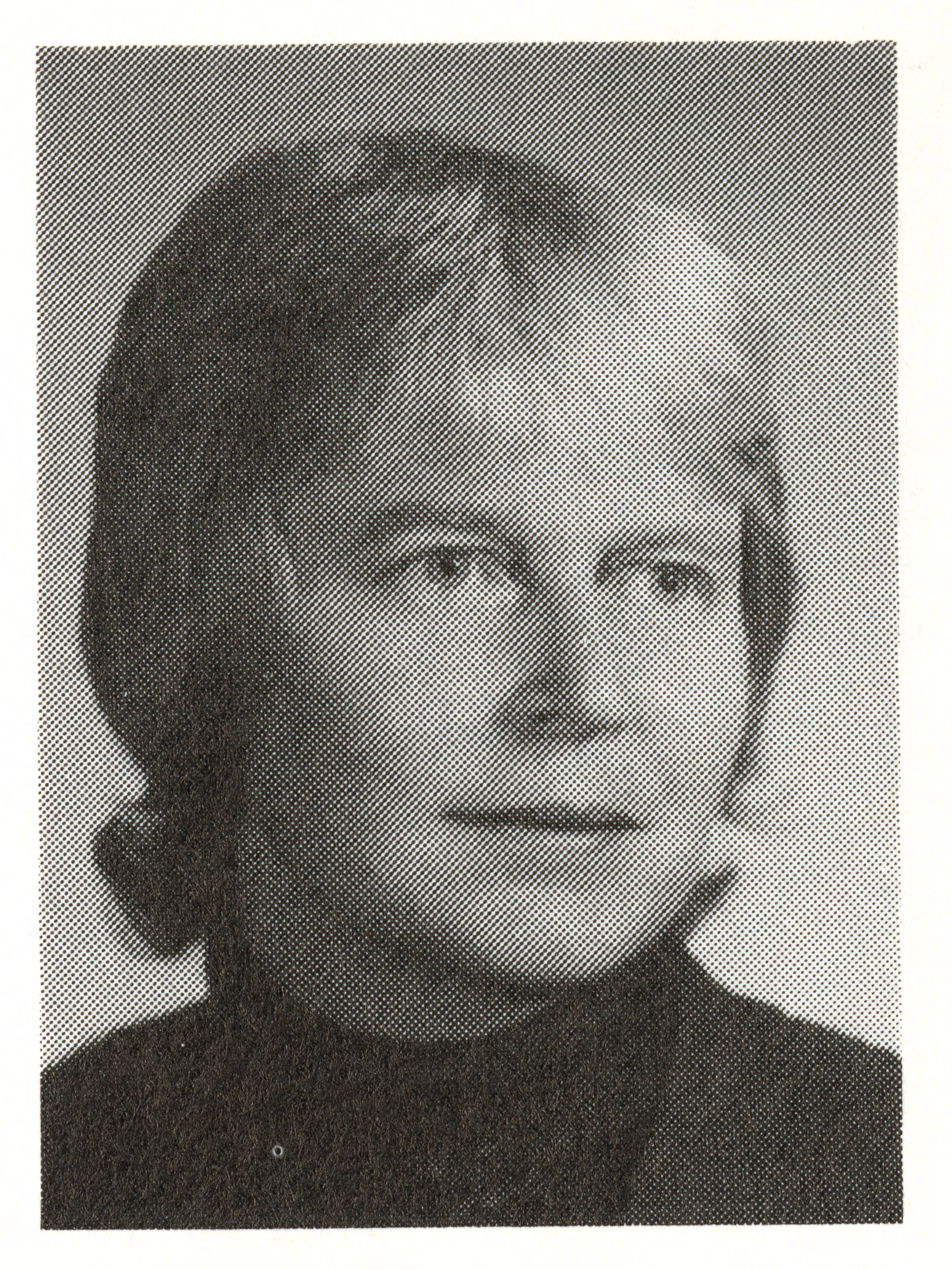

Shirley A. Hokanson (born February 8, 1936) is an American politician and social worker.

Hokanson was born in Morris, Minnesota and graduated from Morris High School in 1954. She received her bachelor's degree from the University of Minnesota in 1958 and her master's degree in sociology and human services planning and administration from Minnesota State University, Mankato in 1977. Hokanson was a social worker and lived in Richfield, Minnesota with her husband and family. She served in the Minnesota House of Representatives from 1977 to 1982 and was a Democrat.
