= KKOK-FM =

Radio station in Morris, Minnesota

Coordinates: 45.603°N 95.888°W

- Morris, Minnesota; United States
- Broadcast area: Alexandria/West Central Minnesota
- Frequency: 95.7 MHz
- Branding: New Country 95.7 KKOK

Programming
- Format: Country

Ownership
- Owner: Iowa City Broadcasting Company, Inc.

History
- First air date: 1976

Technical information
- Licensing authority: FCC
- Class: C1
- ERP: 100,000 Watts
- HAAT: 110 meters

Links
- Public license information: Public file; LMS
- Webcast: Listen Live
- Website: http://www.kmrskkok.com/

KKOK-FM (95.7 FM), also known as "Prairies Hit Country", is a Country formatted radio station in Morris, Minnesota owned by Iowa City Broadcasting Company, Inc.

The 95.7 MHz frequency in Morris, Minnesota, first signed on the air in 1976. The station initially broadcast a Beautiful Music format. The station's current format is Country, branded as "The Hit Kicker," playing a blend of contemporary and current country music.

The station is part of the Ingstad Media group, which is controlled by the Tor H. Ingstad family.

In the 1990s, KKOK-FM carried the Satellite Music Network's (SMN) "Pure Country" format during overnights and weekends. The station has served as a starting point for radio personalities, providing early opportunities for high school news coverage, such as in Wheaton. KKOK-FM broadcasts University of Minnesota-Morris sporting events.

It is located at 46671 State Hwy 28, along with sister station KMRS.
