= Edwin J. Jones =

American businessman and politician

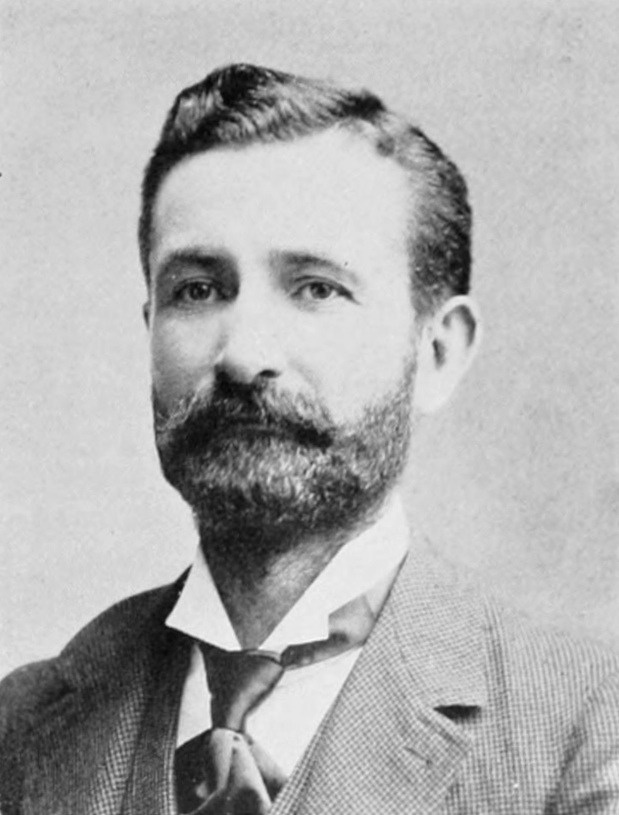

Mayor of Morris, Minnesota
- In office 1914

Member of the Minnesota Senate
- In office 1895–1902

Personal details
- Born: August 22, 1858 Beaver Dam, Wisconsin, U.S.
- Died: June 4, 1930 (aged 71) Morris, Minnesota, U.S.
- Party: Republican
- Spouse: Nellie A. Butterfield (m. 1883)
- Children: 1
- Occupation: Businessman, politician

Edwin J. Jones (August 22, 1858 – June 4, 1930) was an American businessman and politician.

== Biography ==
Jones was born in Beaver Dam, Wisconsin and went to the Dodge County Schools. He moved to Morris, Minnesota in 1878, and married Nellie A. Butterfield on May 29, 1883. They had one son.

Jones was involved in the hardware and lumber businesses. He served on the Morris City Council, as village clerk, and as the city's first mayor in 1914. Jones also served in the Minnesota Senate from 1895 to 1902 and was a Republican.

He died at his home in Morris on June 4, 1930.
