= Royal A. Stone =

American judge

Royal A. Stone, c. 1930

Royal Augustus Stone (June 26, 1875 – September 13, 1942) was an American jurist.

Born in Le Sueur, Minnesota, Stone moved with his parents to Morris, Minnesota. After finishing high school at the academy at Carleton College, he went to University of Minnesota. He then went to the Washington University School of Law and received his law degree in 1897.

Stone was admitted to the Minnesota bar and served as the Morris village attorney in 1897. After a year of practicing law, he served in the United States Army during the Spanish–American War and World War I. From 1905 to 1907, Stone served as an assistant attorney general for the state of Minnesota. He then practiced law in Saint Paul, Minnesota.

Stone served on the Minnesota Supreme Court from 1923 until his death in 1942. He died in a hospital in Saint Paul, Minnesota of a heart ailment only five days after he was renominated for reelection.
