= KMRS =

Coordinates: 45°36′11″N 95°53′14″W

- Morris, Minnesota; United States
- Frequency: 1230 kHz
- Branding: AM 1230

Programming
- Format: [{Classics hits}] ]]
- Affiliations: ABC News Radio; Minnesota Timberwolves; Minnesota Twins

Ownership
- Owner: Iowa City Broadcasting Company, Inc.
- Sister stations: KKOK-FM

History
- First air date: September 16, 1956
- Call sign meaning: K MoRriS

Technical information
- Licensing authority: FCC
- Facility ID: 71877
- Class: C
- Power: 1,000 watts unlimited
- Translator: 107.7 K299BX (Morris)

Links
- Public license information: Public file; LMS
- Webcast: Listen Live
- Website: kmrskkok.com

KMRS (1230 AM) is a full-service/CLASSIC HITS radio station, licensed to Morris, Minnesota. It provides "live" local news, information, weather, and sports and classic hits

18 hours a day. It is owned by Iowa City Broadcasting Company, Inc.

KMRS covers area news and events with a full-time news director, and is affiliated with ABC News Radio, MN News Network and the Linder Farm Network. It's the local home of the Minnesota Timberwolves and the Minnesota Twins. It is located at 46671 State Hwy 28, along with sister station KKOK-FM.

KMRS was founded by Clifford Hedberg, co-publisher of the newspaper in nearby Cokato, MN, in 1956. In the late 1950s radio stations were rapidly filling the landscape in many rural portions of the United States, and this was the case in west-central Minnesota when Hedberg decided to establish KMRS in Morris (at the time two other radio stations, KDIO in Ortonville at KBMO in Benson, were being constructed nearby). Originally located at 1570 kHz with power of 1000 watts, the signal of KMRS extended in a 40-mile radius and broadcast only in the daytime.

In many of these isolated rural areas the arrival of a local radio station was a significant status symbol. An editorial in the Morris Sun emphasized the impact of KMRS: “Evidence continues to pile up that Morris is a growing community. The most recent [example of the town’s vitality and expansion] took place on Sunday when Morris’ new radio station officially went on the air. Morris has now joined the ranks of larger communities with a local radio station. The community now has another service not offered in other county seat towns around here and thus takes a step ahead of those communities.”

Hedberg's son, Paul, recalled the early days of the station's operation in his autobiography: "As autumn progressed we had less time to broadcast and generate revenue: we were a daytime-only station, so we couldn’t come on before sunrise and had to go off the air at sunset (which meant by December we were coming on the air at 7:45 AM and we had to sign off in the afternoon at 4:45 PM). We had good news programming – we had the Associated Press feed and Dad prided himself on writing the local news – but we just didn’t know how to package and sell the airtime around it."

The fortunes of KMRS began to change the following summer: three dedicated telephone lines were run to the fairgrounds so KMRS could cover the Stevens County Fair. The fair was annually the largest gathering of people from the KMRS listening area, and the station capitalized on the interests of its audience base by conducting interviews with exhibitors and drawing the attention of potential fairgoers. As Paul Hedberg noted, "our conspicuous presence gave us valuable public exposure. KMRS became the voice of the Stevens County Fair. After our good showing the fair board’s chairman really went to bat for us. He reported to various local businesspeople that the fair’s attendance had doubled over previous years, and attributed that jump largely to the presence of KMRS. His advocacy gave KMRS the push we needed; we started to get new advertisers, business picked up and we began to cover our expenses."

In the late 1950s the University of Minnesota Board of Regents decided to convert the West Central School of Agriculture in Morris to a full branch of the University of Minnesota system, where it would be reinvented as a public liberal arts college, the University of Minnesota Morris. The prospect of a four-year college opening in the fall of 1960 prompted KMRS to seek a full-time frequency so it was no longer constrained by a broadcast day that was defined by the rising and setting of the sun. In order to effect this change, in June 1960 KMRS relocated from 1570 kHz to 1230 kHz. This change of frequency permitted KMRS to carry fall and winter sports for both Morris High School and UMM.

In 1973 Hedberg applied to the FCC for the construction permit that had been allocated to Morris for a Class C FM station. On September 16, 1976 KMRS-FM signed on at 95.7 MHz – twenty years to the day after the debut of KMRS-AM. Initially KMRS-FM played a format of Beautiful Music; in September 1982 its call letters were changed to KKOK, and its format changed to Country and Western.

In 1994 the Hedberg family sold KMRS-KKOK to Otter Tail Power Company.
