= Stevens County Times =

Coordinates: 45.586624°N 95.916739°W

- Type: Weekly newspaper
- Format: Broadsheet
- Owner(s): Whitney Rae Publishing
- Publisher: Shelly Anfinson
- Editor: Reed Anfinson
- Founded: 1882
- Headquarters: 607 Pacific Ave; Morris, MN 56267
- City: Morris
- Country: United States
- Circulation: 1,944 (as of 2024)
- ISSN: 2573-9492
- OCLC number: 992446440
- Website: stevenscountytimes.com

The Stevens County Times is a local newspaper in Morris, Minnesota. In 2017, the Morris Sun Tribune combined with the Hancock Record to form a joint publication under the new name Stevens County Times.

== History ==
The Morris Sun Tribune was founded in 1882 and was originally known as the Morris Sun. In 1898 the Morrison family assumed ownership of the Morris Sun Tribune.

From 1947 to 1999 the newspaper was run by Edward J. Morrison and his wife Helen Jane. The couple also owned and ran the Hancock Record. In 1999 Edward J. Morrison decided to retire and he sold the company to Forum Communications Company. He stressed the importance of selling the newspaper to a company that was dedicated to quality because the newspaper had been owned by the Morrison family for so long. Even after he sold the newspaper to Forum Communications Company, he made frequent visits to the office to check in on everything until his death in January, 2017.

In 2016, Rae Yost became the new editor of the Morris Sun Tribune, replacing Kim Ukura who had served as the editor for the previous five years. In June 2017, Forum Communications Company merged the Hancock Record with the Morris Sun Tribune. The newspaper is now called The Stevens County Times and it covers Stevens County, Minnesota and the surrounding counties. The main reasons for this change were economic; according to the publisher Sue Dieter, print advertising revenue is decreasing for the newspaper while other newspaper costs are increasing.

== Coverage ==
The newspaper coverage includes local news, business, sports and community events. The newspaper also has a section titled Farm which is dedicated to agriculture related news. Each year they release a report called Farm Progress which discusses the changes in agriculture in west central Minnesota that year.

== Awards ==
In 2012, the Morris Sun Tribune received third place for best website and third place in government and public affairs reporting in the Minnesota Newspaper Association's Better Newspaper Contest. In the 2017 Minnesota Newspaper Association contest the newspaper won first place in the general excellence for weeklies 1,501 to 2,500. The Morris Sun Tribune also won first place for its website for weeklies up to 2,500.

== See also ==
- Morris, Minnesota
- Stevens County, Minnesota
