= Charlie Roy =

American baseball player (1884-1950)

- Pitcher
- Born: June 22, 1884; Beaulieu, Minnesota
- Died: February 10, 1950 (aged 65); Blackfoot, Idaho
- Batted: Right Threw: Right

MLB debut
- June 27, 1906, for the Philadelphia Phillies

Last MLB appearance
- August 10, 1906, for the Philadelphia Phillies

MLB statistics
- Win–loss record: 0–1
- Strikeouts: 6
- Earned run average: 4.91
- Stats at Baseball Reference

Teams
- Philadelphia Phillies (1906)

Robert Charles Roy (June 22, 1884 – February 10, 1950) was a professional baseball pitcher in the Major Leagues for the 1906 Philadelphia Phillies. After playing baseball at the Morris Industrial School for Indians in Minnesota and the Carlisle Indian Industrial School in Pennsylvania, he was signed by the Philadelphia Phillies and played in the 1906 baseball season. Following that season, he played for some minor league teams before quitting professional baseball after the 1907 season. Roy eventually relocated to Idaho where he worked at the Fort Hall Indian Reservation school until his death. His brother, Louis Roy, also played professional baseball.

== Baseball career ==
Charles Roy was a White Earth Ojibwe who was raised for his early life on the White Earth Indian Reservation. In his early teens, he started school at the Morris Industrial School for Indians and while there he became a key member of the school's baseball team. Because the team lacked the funds for coaches, Charles reported that he learned how to pitch from his older brother Louis Roy.

After graduating from Morris in 1904, he began study at the Carlisle Indian Industrial School in 1905 and 1906. Charles was the captain of the Carlisle baseball team (a team which produced professional baseball players Chief Bender, Frank Jude, Chief Johnson and athlete Jim Thorpe) and the star pitcher for the team. The school newspaper called him "the best college pitcher in the country today."

The Cincinnati Reds tried to sign Roy in fall of 1905, but the only response came from Major William Allen Mercer, the superintendent of the school, who said "Charles Roy is now away on leave at the White Earth Reservation, in Minnesota...He informed me that he does not intend pitching professional ball for at least two years." However, in May 1906, the Philadelphia Phillies succeeded in signing Roy. He debuted in June 1906 at twenty-one years of age.

His playing time with Philadelphia was limited to eight games and sixteen innings, mostly in relief. His contract expired at the end of the season and he played for minor league teams like the Newark Sailors, Wilmington Peaches, and the Steubenville Stubs during 1907.

== Life after playing ==
At the end of the 1907 baseball season, Roy was drafted by the Boston Red Stockings but refused to show up. The Washington Post commented about the decision by writing that Roy "says he has had all the National League game he wanted, and rather than report he will go back to the plains and throw mud balls at his fellow-Indians." Having deep religious convictions, Roy explained that he would "never again sign a contract which required him to work on the Sabbath."

In his later life, Roy returned to the White Earth Indian reservation, joined the U.S. Army during World War I, before moving to Idaho on an evangelical Christian mission. He eventually moved to Blackfoot, Idaho where he became the main dairyman at the Indian industrial school at the Fort Hall Indian Reservation.
