= Donnelly, Minnesota =

City in Minnesota, United States

Donnelly
- City
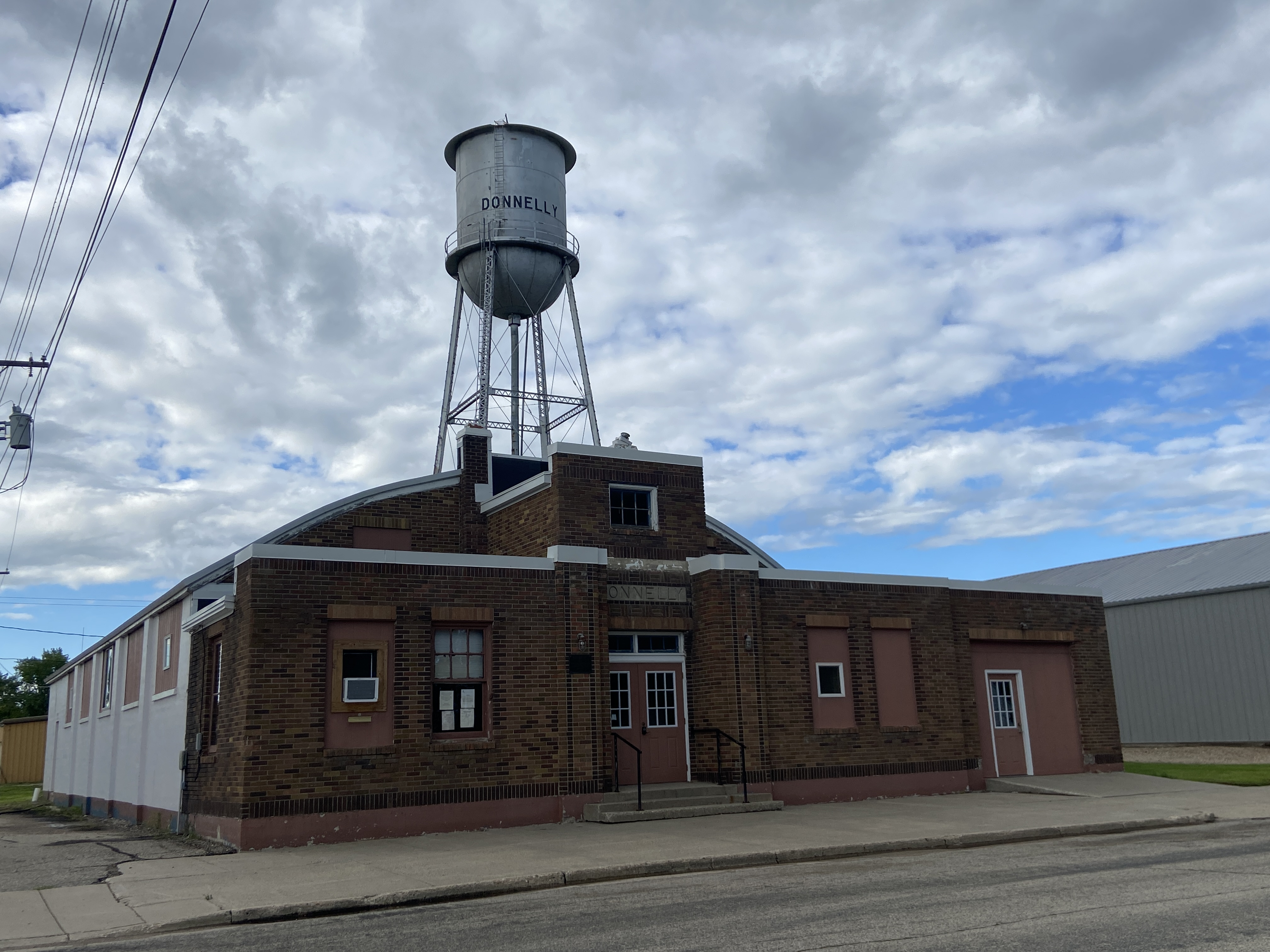
- Donnelly Community Hall & City Offices

- Location of Donnelly, Minnesota
- Coordinates: 45°41′23″N 96°00′51″W
- Country: United States
- State: Minnesota
- County: Stevens

Area
  - Total: 3.11 sq mi (8.05 km^{2})
  - Land: 2.78 sq mi (7.21 km^{2})
  - Water: 0.32 sq mi (0.84 km^{2})
- Elevation: 1,129 ft (344 m)

Population (2020)
  - Total: 221
  - Estimate (2021): 216
  - Density: 79.4/sq mi (30.65/km^{2})
- Time zone: UTC-6 (CST)
  - Summer (DST): UTC-5 (CDT)
- ZIP code: 56235
- Area code: 320
- FIPS code: 27-16084
- GNIS feature ID: 2394546

Donnelly is a city in Stevens County, Minnesota, United States. The population was 221 at the 2020 census.

== History ==
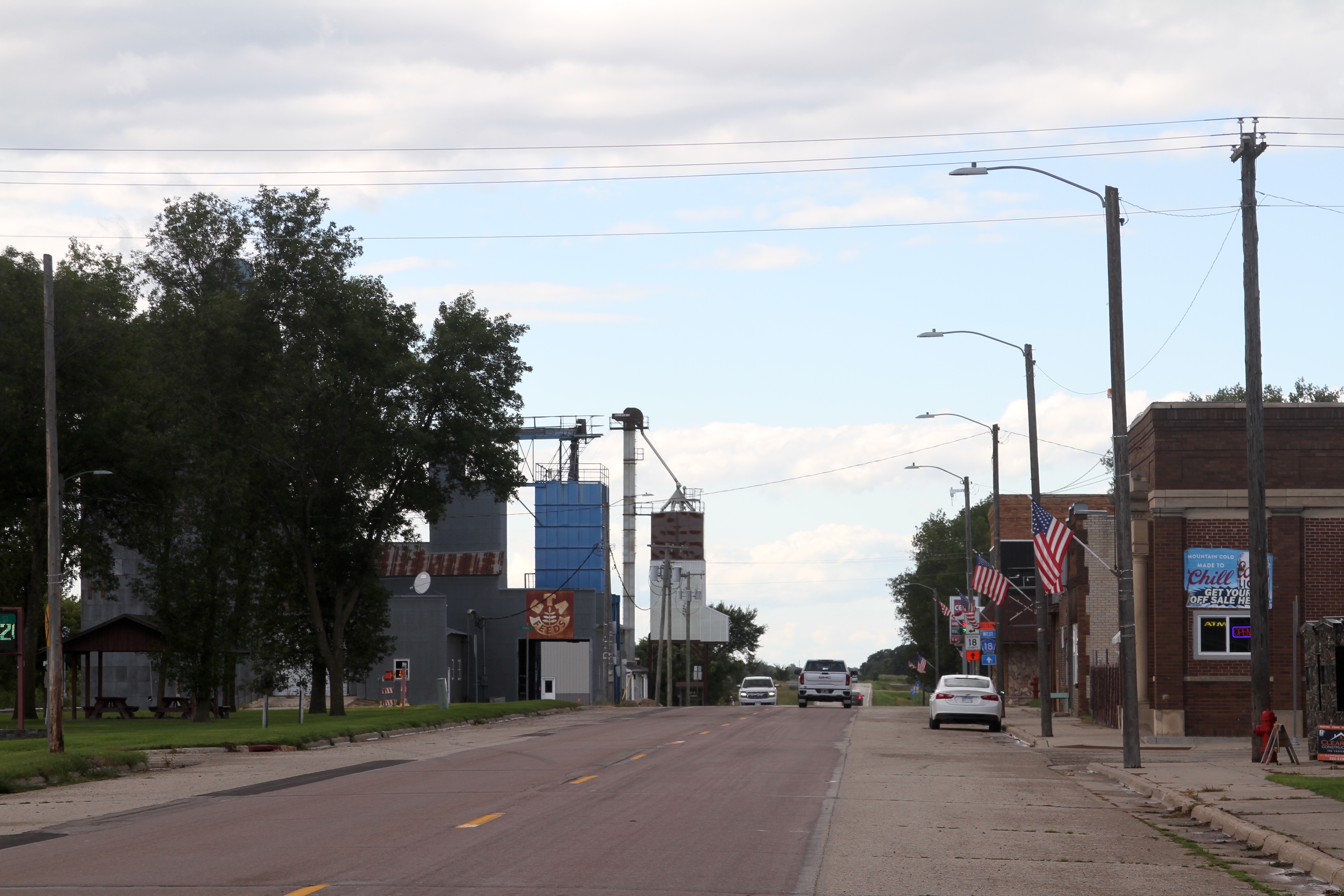
Donnelly, Minnesota

Donnelly was originally called Douglas, and under the latter name was laid out in 1872. The present name is in honor of Ignatius L. Donnelly, a U.S. Congressman from Minnesota. A post office called Donnelly has been in operation since 1876.

The annual Donnelly Threshing Bee was first held in 1965.

== Geography ==
According to the United States Census Bureau, the city has a total area of 3.08 square miles (7.98 km^{2}), of which 2.76 square miles (7.15 km^{2}) is land and 0.32 square miles (0.83 km^{2}) is water.

Minnesota State Highway 9 serves as a main route in the community.

== Demographics ==
Historical population
Census	Pop.	Note	%±
1900	164		—
1910	276		68.3%
1920	354		28.3%
1930	309		−12.7%
1940	370		19.7%
1950	396		7.0%
1960	358		−9.6%
1970	252		−29.6%
1980	317		25.8%
1990	221		−30.3%
2000	254		14.9%
2010	241		−5.1%
2020	221		−8.3%
2021 (est.)	216		−2.3%
U.S. Decennial Census; 2020 Census

=== 2010 census ===
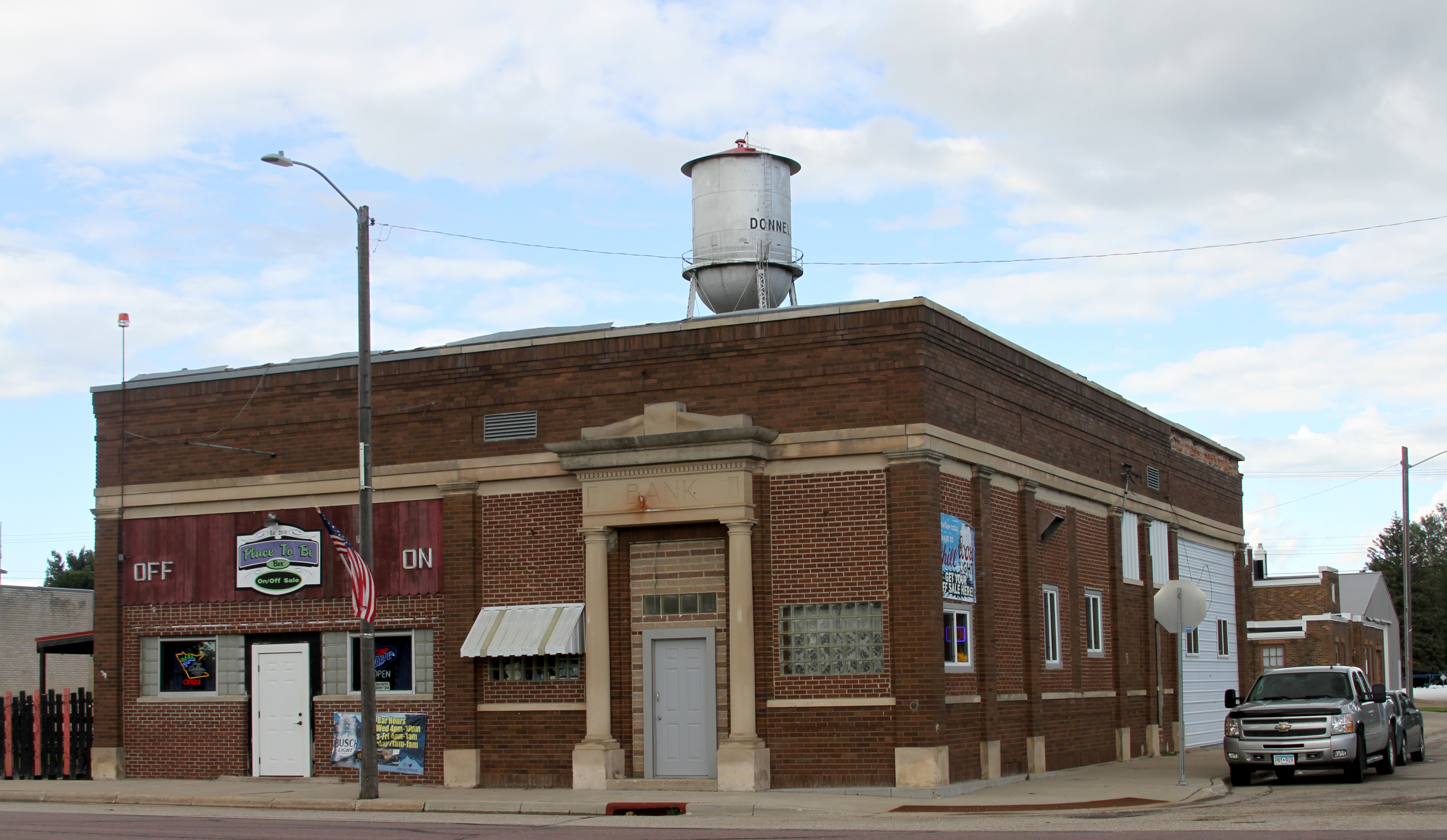
Donnelly, Minnesota

As of the census of 2010, there were 241 people, 113 households, and 72 families residing in the city. The population density was 87.3 inhabitants per square mile (33.7/km^{2}). There were 125 housing units at an average density of 45.3 per square mile (17.5/km^{2}). The racial makeup of the city was 100.0% White.

There were 113 households, of which 22.1% had children under the age of 18 living with them, 52.2% were married couples living together, 7.1% had a female householder with no husband present, 4.4% had a male householder with no wife present, and 36.3% were non-families. 28.3% of all households were made up of individuals, and 17.7% had someone living alone who was 65 years of age or older. The average household size was 2.13 and the average family size was 2.63.

The median age in the city was 50.1 years. 17.8% of residents were under the age of 18; 4.1% were between the ages of 18 and 24; 20.7% were from 25 to 44; 27.5% were from 45 to 64; and 29.9% were 65 years of age or older. The gender makeup of the city was 49.4% male and 50.6% female.

=== 2000 census ===
As of the census of 2000, there were 254 people, 114 households, and 71 families residing in the city. The population density was 92.2 inhabitants per square mile (35.6/km^{2}). There were 121 housing units at an average density of 43.9 per square mile (16.9/km^{2}). The racial makeup of the city was 98.03% White, 0.79% Native American, 1.18% from other races. Hispanic or Latino of any race were 1.18% of the population.

There were 114 households, out of which 27.2% had children under the age of 18 living with them, 57.9% were married couples living together, 1.8% had a female householder with no husband present, and 37.7% were non-families. 31.6% of all households were made up of individuals, and 15.8% had someone living alone who was 65 years of age or older. The average household size was 2.23 and the average family size was 2.82.

In the city, the population was spread out, with 24.0% under the age of 18, 5.1% from 18 to 24, 28.7% from 25 to 44, 20.1% from 45 to 64, and 22.0% who were 65 years of age or older. The median age was 41 years. For every 100 females, there were 96.9 males. For every 100 females age 18 and over, there were 99.0 males.

The median income for a household in the city was $35,972, and the median income for a family was $41,250. Males had a median income of $33,125 versus $13,750 for females. The per capita income for the city was $22,523. About 2.7% of families and 2.5% of the population were below the poverty line, including none of those under the age of eighteen and 11.8% of those 65 or over.
