= Morris Municipal Airport =

Airport in Stevens County, Minnesota, US

Morris Municipal Airport Charlie Schmidt Field
- IATA: MOX; ICAO: KMOX; FAA LID: MOX

Summary
- Airport type: Public
- Owner: City of Morris
- Location: Morris, Minnesota
- Opened: March 1942
- Elevation AMSL: 1,135.9 ft / 346 m
- Coordinates: 45°33′57″N 095°58′01″W
- Website: ci.morris.mn.us/airport

Map
- Location of airport in Minnesota / United States MOX (the United States)

Runways
Direction	Length		Surface
Direction	ft	m	Surface
14/32	4,002	1,220	Asphalt
4/22	2,637	804	Grass

Statistics
- Aircraft operations (2017): 5,906
- Based aircraft (2017): 19
- Source: FAA

Morris Municipal Airport (IATA: MOX, ICAO: KMOX, FAA LID: MOX), also known as Charlie Schmidt Field, is a public use airport three miles (5 km) southwest of Morris in Stevens County, Minnesota. It is owned and operated by the City of Morris.

The airport is named after longtime Morris resident Charlie Schmidt, the founder of the Minnesota "Flying Farmers." Schmidt was an aerial applicator and flight instructor.

== History ==
The airport was built under a Works Progress Administration grant in 1940. The airport opened in 1942 with four turf runways ranging in length from 1700 to 3400 feet long. The newly opened airport hosted a Civilian Pilot Training Program during World War II. In the early 1960s the east–west turf runway was closed, and the north–south turf runway was closed in the early 1980s. In 1961 state and federal funding was used to grade a new Runway 14–32, and regrade the north–south runway. In 1965 state and federal funding was used to pave runway 14–32 at 3000 feet by 75 feet and to install runway lighting. In 1984 Runway 14-32 was reconstructed and lengthened to 3400 feet. In 2003 the runway was extended another 600 feet to its current length. In 2016 a parallel taxiway for runway 14-32 was constructed.

== Facilities and aircraft ==
Morris Municipal Airport - Charlie Schmidt Field covers 163 acres encompassing two runways. Runway 14/32 serves as the main runway with an asphalt surface measuring 4,002 by 75 feet. Runway 4/22 is turf and serves as the crosswind runway measuring 2,637 by 145 feet. The turf runway at MOX is closed during the winter.

The airport features an arrival and departure building built in 1990 for general aviation and several hangars.

In 2017, the airport had 5,906 aircraft operations, with 19 aircraft based at the field.

Flying clubs at the airport include Morris-Hancock Flying Club and Pomme De Terre Flying Club.

== See also ==
- List of airports in Minnesota
