= Marty Hoffmann =

American football coach

Current position
- Title: Head coach
- Team: Minnesota Morris
- Conference: UMAC
- Record: 31–58

Playing career
- 2001–2004: Minnesota Morris
- Positions: Linebacker, defensive back

Coaching career (HC unless noted)
- 2005: Minnesota Morris (GA)
- 2006–2007: South Dakota State (GA)
- 2008–2010: Carleton (ST/DB)
- 2011–2012: Minnesota State–Moorhead (co-DC/ST)
- 2013–2016: Minnesota Morris (DC)
- 2017: Minnesota Morris (co-HC)
- 2018–present: Minnesota Morris

Head coaching record
- Overall: 31–58
- Tournaments: 0–1 (NCAA D-III playoffs)

Accomplishments and honors

Championships
- 1 UMAC (2023)

Awards
- UMAC Coach of the Year (2023)

Marty Hoffmann is an American college football coach. He is the head football coach for University of Minnesota Morris, a position he has held since 2017. Hoffmann was a standout linebacker at Minnesota Morris from 2001 to 2004, before going into coaching, starting as a graduate assistant at his alma mater, before moving to Division I program South Dakota State, once again as a graduate assistant, where he helped coach defensive backs and special teams. Hoffmann then coached defensive backs at Carleton for three seasons, before becoming the co-defensive coordinator at Minnesota State–Moorhead for two seasons. Following his stint with Moorhead, he returned to Morris, as the defensive coordinator under Todd Hickman and his successor Rob Cushman. After Cushman's departure after the 2016 season, Hoffmann was named as co-head coach alongside Matthew Johnson for the 2017 season, in which the Cougars struggled to 1–9 record. Despite the struggles, Minnesota Morris named Hoffmann the full-time head coach following the season. In 2023, Hoffman led the Cougars to their first conference title in 17 seasons as well as their first playoff appearance since 1981.

== Head coaching record ==
Year	Team	Overall	Conference	Standing	Bowl/playoffs
Minnesota Morris Cougars (Upper Midwest Athletic Conference) (2017–present)
2017	Minnesota Morris	1–9*	1–8	9th	
2018	Minnesota Morris	3–7	3–5	7th	
2019	Minnesota Morris	1–9	1–7	8th	
2020–21	Minnesota Morris	0–2	0–2	6th	
2021	Minnesota Morris	5–5	4–2	3rd	
2022	Minnesota Morris	5–5	4–2	3rd	
2023	Minnesota Morris	7–4	5–0	1st	L NCAA Division III First Round
2024	Minnesota Morris	5–5	4–3	T–3rd	
2025	Minnesota Morris	3–7	3–4	T–3rd	
2026	Minnesota Morris	1–5	0–3		
Minnesota Morris:		31–58	25–36	* Hoffmann was co-head coach with Matthew Johnson for the 2017 season.	
Total:		31–58			
National championship Conference title Conference division title or championship game berth
