= Monti Ossenfort =

American football executive (born 1978)

Arizona Cardinals
- Title: General manager

Personal information
- Born: February 24, 1978 (age 48); Emporia, Kansas, U.S.

Career information
- Position: Quarterback
- College: Minnesota–Morris (1996–1999)

Career history
- Minnesota Vikings (2001) Intern; Houston Texans (2002) Pro personnel intern; New England Patriots (2003) Personnel assistant; Houston Texans (2004) Scouting assistant; Houston Texans (2005) Scout; New England Patriots (2006–2010) Scout; New England Patriots (2011–2013) Assistant director of college scouting; New England Patriots (2014–2019) Director of college scouting; Tennessee Titans (2020–2022) Director of player personnel; Arizona Cardinals (2023–present) General manager

Awards and highlights
- 4× Super Bowl champion (XXXVIII, XLIX, LI, LIII)
- Executive profile at Pro Football Reference

Monti A. Ossenfort (born February 24, 1978) is an American professional football executive who is the general manager of the Arizona Cardinals of the National Football League (NFL). He began his NFL career as an intern for the Minnesota Vikings in 2001 before serving in the scouting department for the Houston Texans during their inaugural season in 2002.

Ossenfort would leave to serve as an assistant with the New England Patriots the following year before returning to the Texans as a scout. He would go back to the Patriots in 2006, where he served various executive roles with them and as director of player personnel for the Tennessee Titans before being named general manager of the Cardinals in 2023.

== Early life ==
A native of Luverne, Minnesota, Ossenfort attended and played college football at the University of Minnesota–Morris as a quarterback from 1996 to 1999. He was a temporary host of the popular student radio program "SportsShow" Sunday mornings on K-UMM 89.7 the "U-90 Alternative." He earned his degree in economics from the University of Minnesota Morris in 2000. Ossenfort also earned two master's degrees in business administration and sports management from Ohio University in 2002.

== Executive career ==
=== Minnesota Vikings ===
In 2001, Ossenfort began his NFL career as an intern with the Minnesota Vikings.

=== Houston Texans (first stint) ===
In 2002, Ossenfort was hired by the Houston Texans as a pro personnel intern under general manager Charley Casserly.

=== New England Patriots (first stint) ===
In 2003, Ossenfort was hired by the New England Patriots as a personnel assistant under head coach and de facto general manager Bill Belichick. That season, the Patriots went on to win Super Bowl XXXVIII.

=== Houston Texans (second stint) ===
In 2004, Ossenfort was re-hired by the Houston Texans as their pro and college scouting assistant. In 2005, he was promoted to college scout.

=== New England Patriots (second stint) ===
In 2006, Ossenfort was re-hired by the New England Patriots as an area scout.

In 2009, he was promoted to national scout and to assistant director of college scouting in 2011.

In 2014, Ossenfort was promoted to director of college scouting. In the same season, the Patriots went on to win Super Bowl XLIX, their fourth Super Bowl title and Ossenfort's second with the team. During the remainder of his tenure, the Patriots were able to win two additional Super Bowl titles in Super Bowl LI and Super Bowl LIII.

=== Tennessee Titans ===
On May 4, 2020, Ossenfort was hired by the Tennessee Titans as their director of player personnel under general manager Jon Robinson, whom Ossenfort worked with in New England.

=== Arizona Cardinals ===
On January 16, 2023, Ossenfort was named general manager of the Arizona Cardinals.

== Personal life ==
Ossenfort and his wife, Shannon, have three daughters, Emery, Finley and Landry.
