= Todd Hickman =

American football player and coach (born 1963)

Playing career
- 1981–1984: Minnesota–Morris
- Position: Running back

Coaching career (HC unless noted)
- 1988: Apollo HS (MN) (assistant)
- 1989–1990: Minnesota–Morris (assistant)
- 1991: Nebraska–Kearney (GA)
- 1992–1993: Minnesota–Morris (assistant)
- 1994–1996: Hibbing CC
- 1997–2006: Minnesota–Morris (assistant)
- 2007–2014: Minnesota–Morris

Head coaching record
- Overall: 30–47

Todd Hickman (born 1963) is an American football coach and former player. He was the head football coach for the University of Minnesota Morris Cougars football team, a position he held since the 2007 season. Prior to coming to UMM, Hickman was the head football coach at Hibbing Community College in Hibbing, Minnesota. While there he also had coaching duties in basketball and baseball. Hickman finished his 18th year at UMM in 2014; while there he had been the offensive coordinator, defensive coordinator and coached nearly all positions, at times several at once.

He finished with a record 30-47 overall and 22-35 in UMAC play over eight seasons. During his stretch at UMM Hickman coached over 45 All-UMAC players, one All-Region player and one Co-SIDA All-American.

== Head coaching record ==
Year	Team	Overall	Conference	Standing	Bowl/playoffs
Minnesota–Morris Cougars (Upper Midwest Athletic Conference) (2007–2013)
2007	Minnesota–Morris	4–5	4–3		
2008	Minnesota–Morris	3–6	1–3		
2009	Minnesota–Morris	4–6	1–5		
2010	Minnesota–Morris	5–4	4–2	T–3rd	
2011	Minnesota–Morris	5–5	4–4	5th	
2012	Minnesota–Morris	6–4	5–3	4th	
2013	Minnesota–Morris	3–7	3–6	7th	
2014	Minnesota–Morris	0–10	0–9	10th	
Minnesota–Morris:		30–47	22–35		
Total:		30–47			
