= Charlie Hussman =

American football coach

Charles Hussman
Biographical details
- Education: Cornell College (1960)

Coaching career (HC unless noted)
- 2004: Martin Luther

Head coaching record
- Overall: 6–3

Accomplishments and honors

Awards
- UMAC Coach of the Year (2004)

Charles Hussman is a retired American football coach. He was the head football coach at the Martin Luther College in New Ulm, Minnesota in 2004, a season in which he would be named Upper Midwest Athletic Conference Coach of the Year.

== Head coaching record ==
=== College ===
Year	Team	Overall	Conference	Standing	Rank^{#}
Martin Luther Knights (Upper Midwest Athletic Conference) (2004)
2004	Martin Luther	6–3	6–1		
Martin Luther:		6–3	6–1		
Total:		6–3			
National championship Conference title Conference division title or championship game berth
