= Jim Lind (American football) =

American football player and coach (born 1947)

Biographical details
- Born: November 11, 1947 (age 78); Isle, Minnesota, U.S.

Playing career
- 1965–1966: Bethel (MN)
- 1971–1972: Bemidji State
- Positions: Defensive back, linebacker

Coaching career (HC unless noted)
- 1974–1976: Underwood HS (MN)
- 1977: St. Cloud State (GA)
- 1978: St. Cloud State (OC)
- 1979–1980: Saint John's (MN) (DC)
- 1981–1982: BYU (GA)
- 1983–1986: Minnesota–Morris
- 1987–1991: Wisconsin–Eau Claire
- 1992–1994: Green Bay Packers (DA/QC)
- 1995–1998: Green Bay Packers (LB)
- 1999: Seattle Seahawks (LB)
- 2000–2008: Seattle Seahawks (TE)

Head coaching record
- Overall: 42–43–4 (college)

Accomplishments and honors

Championships
- 2 NIC (1984, 1986)

Jim Lind (born November 11, 1947) is an American former football player and coach. He served as the head football coach at the University of Minnesota Morris from 1983 to 1986 and at the University of Wisconsin–Eau Claire from 1987 to 1991, compiling a career college football record of 42–43–4.

Lind served in the United States Navy before attending Bemidji State University, where he played football and received a physical education and health degree in 1973. He coached the football and wrestling teams at Underwood High School in Minnesota after receiving his degree. As the head football coach at the University of Minnesota, Morris, he coached the team to an NIC co-championship in 1984 and an NIC championship in 1986. He was named NIC Coach of the year in 1984 and NAIA District 13 Coach of the Year in 1986. He later served as the head coach at the University of Wisconsin–Eau Claire. He was an assistant coach with the Green Bay Packers from 1992 to 1998. In 1999, Lind moved with Packers' head coach Mike Holmgren to the Seattle Seahawks.

== Head coaching record ==
=== College ===
Year	Team	Overall	Conference	Standing	Bowl/playoffs
Minnesota–Morris Cougars (Northern Intercollegiate Conference) (1983–1986)
1983	Minnesota–Morris	5–4–1	2–3–1	4th	
1984	Minnesota–Morris	5–4	5–1	T–1st	
1985	Minnesota–Morris	3–7	3–3	T–3rd	
1986	Minnesota–Morris	7–1–2	5–0–1	1st	
Minnesota–Morris:		20–16–3	15–7–2		
Wisconsin–Eau Claire Blugolds (Wisconsin Intercollegiate Athletic Conference) (1987–1991)
1987	Wisconsin–Eau Claire	6–4	5–3	T–3rd	
1988	Wisconsin–Eau Claire	5–5	3–5	7th	
1989	Wisconsin–Eau Claire	7–3	5–3	5th	
1990	Wisconsin–Eau Claire	2–8	1–7	T–8th	
1991	Wisconsin–Eau Claire	2–7–1	1–6–1	T–8th	
Wisconsin–Eau Claire:		22–27–1	15–24–1		
Total:		42–43–4			
National championship Conference title Conference division title or championship game berth
