= The University Register =

Newspaper of the University of Minnesota Morris

- The November 8, 2007 front page of The University Register
- Type: Weekly student newspaper
- Format: Broadsheet
- Owner: Students of UMM
- Founded: 1960
- Political alignment: None
- Headquarters: 600 E 4th St; Morris, MN 56267; United States
- Circulation: 400
- Price: Free
- Website: urmorris.com

The University Register (UR) is the official campus newspaper of the University of Minnesota Morris, and is published bi-weekly during the academic year. It primarily serves the University of Minnesota Morris campus and the greater Morris community. The paper is entirely student-run, operating out of the basement of the school's Multi-Ethnic Resource Center, and distributes over 1,500 copies to the campus every Thursday night. A typical issue of The UR is between fourteen and eighteen pages long, and consists of five sections: News, Editorial, Arts & Entertainment, Variety, and a Feature.

== History ==
The first edition of The University Register ran in 1960. While only a few surviving issues from the first six years of publication remain, it is clear that the title The Vanguard was adopted immediately following the publication of the first issue. Printed on 8.5"x11" glossy stock and printed in a newsletter format, The Vanguard adopted a newspaper format by the 1970s, and finally switched to the compact format soon thereafter. By 1975, however, the Vanguard changed its name to The Campus Community Writer, and then again changed its name to The Morris Weekly in 1977. As The Morris Weekly, the newspaper became more recognisable as the publication it is today, with five distinct sections, consistent news coverage, and the adaptation of AP style. In 1987, the newspaper made its longest lasting name change as The University Register, and has been printed under that title ever since.

The UR debuted its first colour photograph in the fall of 2003, and continued to periodically feature a color front page, depending on the extent of incoming ad revenue for that particular issue. In 2006, The University Register began printing its first page in color for every single issue.

In the fall of 2003 The University Register moved its prepress production to an entirely digital process, by sending PDF documents electronically to its printing company. Previously, the page proofs were printed on oversized paper and driven to the printer, where the proofs were converted into plates for printing.

In the fall of 2007, The University Register switched from the compact format to broadsheet.

During the 2009-2010 academic school year, the University Register ran out of funds and briefly ceased publication. However, it resumed printing the next year.

== Organisation ==
The University Register is an entirely student-run organisation, and is administrated by an editorial board. The board is constituted of twelve students who are elected each year by regular contributors to the paper, with each board member serving a one-year term. Typically, it is the editor-in-chief who makes most of the day-to-day policy decisions for the paper, with big issues going before the board for approval; however, leadership styles of past EICs have varied widely from year to year. Some EICs have only served as figureheads to the organisation, with most policy decisions being made by the editorial board. However, other EICs have been known to use the board just as an advisory group. In any case, while it is the collective power of the editorial board which determines the direction of the organisation, it is the executive power of the editor-in-chief who carries the paper in that direction.

The editorial board consists of the editor-in-chief, managing editor, advertising manager, photo editor, online editor, circulation manager, head copy editor, and the five section editors: the news editor, arts & entertainment editor, variety editor, sports editor, and feature editor.

After the 2004–2005 academic year, the business manager position was eliminated, and was absorbed into the editor-in-chief, managing editor and advertising manager positions.

As of 2008, the Register paid student staff an untaxed stipend. The paper employed 20 people in that year, with, reporters earning $50 per semester and the managing editor making $800 per year.

== Notoriety ==
The University Register has covered many local events that made national news, including the election of a male homecoming queen in 2001 (UR, MFC), the production of a children's show that contained themes of gay tolerance in 2005 (UR, MTV) and the death of a student in a homecoming accident in 2005 (UR, ESPN).

In 2006, the Minnesota Newspaper Association awarded writer Eagan Heath second place in general reporting for his article on a controversial forum on racism and free speech that occurred on campus.

A 2001 April Fool's issue made fun of the school's then-notorious losing streak in football, reporting that the recruitment of a multi-talented player named Jesus Christ put the coach in a bind "since they have 22 positions that need help."

== See also ==
- University of Minnesota Morris
- KUMM
- Minnesota Daily
