= Mother Mary Joseph Lynch =

Mother Mary Joseph Lynch (1826 - May 19, 1898) was the founder of the Native American boarding school that became the University of Minnesota Morris. She was a member of the Catholic order the Sisters of Mercy.

== Early life ==
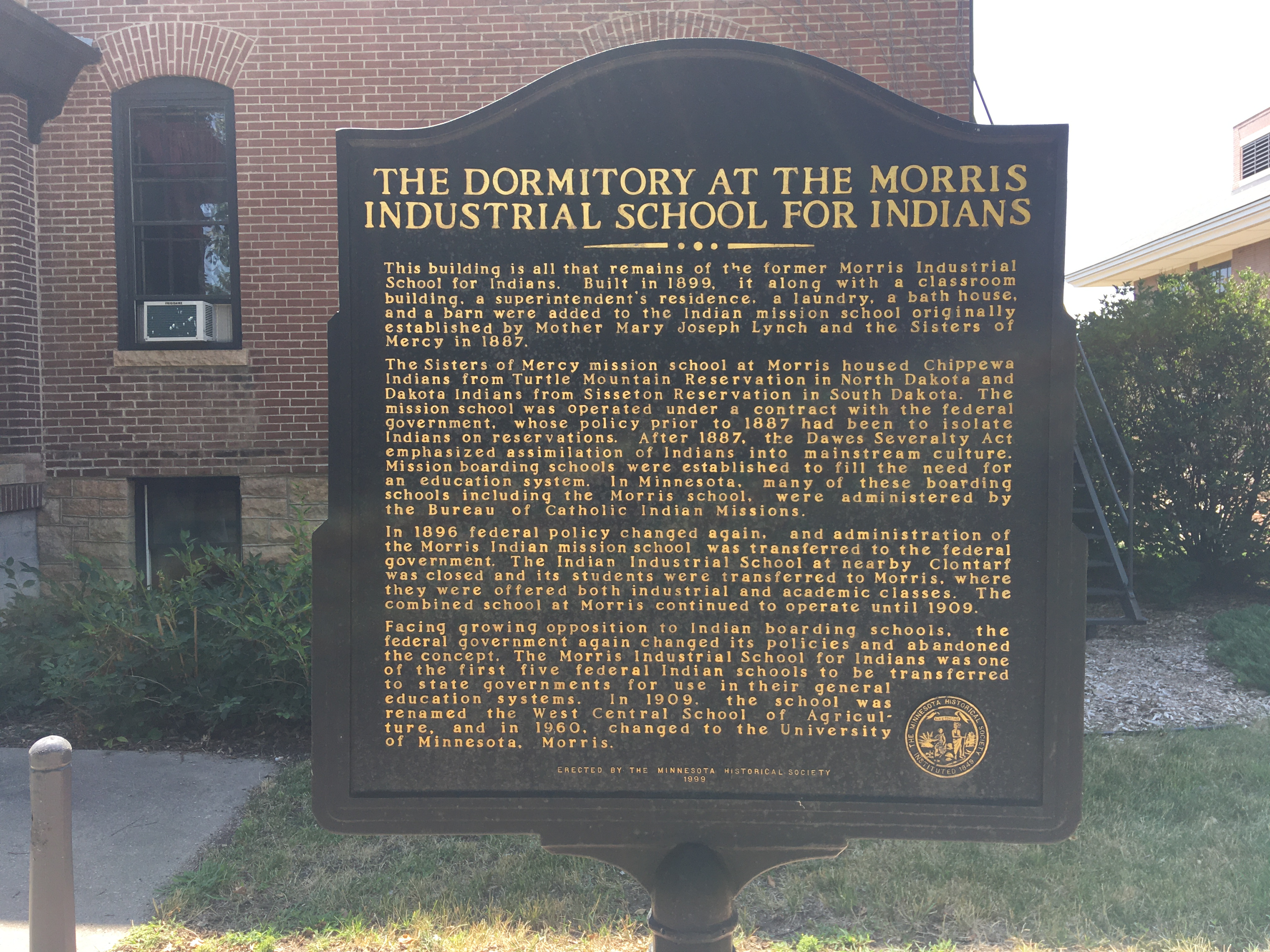
A sign on the green at the University of Minnesota Morris telling of the school's origin as a boarding school for Native Americans

Born Alicia Lynch in Cork, Ireland in 1826, Mother Mary Joseph Lynch joined the Sister of Mercy in 1846 at the Kinsale Convent of Mercy in Ireland, being one of the first to join this new convent. There, she began teaching in the Convent's schools and learning how to care for the sick during cholera outbreaks. In 1854, Bishop Thomas Grant of Southwark asked Sisters of Mercy to join Florence Nightingale during the Crimean War. With several other Sisters of Mercy, and other lay and religious women, Lynch went to France where she did work with Nightingale, though she and the other sisters incurred some of Nightingale's wrath.

Shortly after returning to Kinsale, in 1859, Lynch again moved, this time to Brooklyn, New York in the United States where she became the Mother Assistant and Bursar, where she continued the Sisters' educational mission as she also took on more administrative tasks. Lynch again moved in 1872, when she left Brooklyn for Rochester, New York, where she assisted in creating a large industrial school for vagrant and destitute boys and girls. After only a year in Rochester, Lynch attempted to return to Brooklyn but was refused by the Brooklyn community. In 1873, Lynch then moved to Grand Rapids, Michigan, where she established a school but ran into disagreements with the Bishop of the area that forced her and other sisters with her to move sixty miles to Big Rapids, Michigan where she set up another school. Running afoul of the bishop again, in 1879, Mother Joseph moved with four other Sisters to St. Paul, Minnesota to take over a school that had formerly been run by the Sisters of St. Joseph. They stayed in St. Paul a short time, before moving to Mendota, Minnesota, where they lived in the well known Sibley House.

== Career ==
In 1886, Mother Joseph and her sisters moved to Morris, Minnesota at the request of a local parish priest, Father Francis Watry, who wanted them to create a Parochial school. Because Morris did not have to population to support such a school, Lynch and her sisters began a Native American School, named Sacred Heart Indian Mission. The school was one of a series of schools in the United States funded by the Bureau of Indian Affairs (BIA), paying religious organizations for the Native students they taught. The BIA began earlier, in 1868, President Ulysses S. Grant adopted a "Peace Policy" in an attempt to end the corruption of Indian Agents who supervised the Reservations in which Native Americans were placed. This policy utilized Christian missionaries to teach indigenous children, building on the belief that Christian missionaries would help the American Indians become better Americans. At first, these missionaries were almost wholly Protestant, until the Bureau of Catholic Indian Missions was started in 1884 by Archbishop of Baltimore to promote the Catholic Church among indigenous peoples.

Having abandoned plans to create a school for settler children in Morris, in 1887, Lynch and her other Sisters of Mercy opened their school with its first Native children, three from the Sisseton Agency in nearby North Dakota: Lydia James (age 11), Alice Else (age 14), and Cecilia Hippi (age 6). The school continued until 1897, Lynch ran this Mission, offering classes in everything from carpentry, weaving, and sewing to literature. During this time, Lynch constantly attempted to get more students so she could fund the school, finding many at the Turtle Mountain Agency in North Dakota. In an undated "A Plea for Contract Schools," Lynch argued for the benefits of such schools. In 1889, Lynch reported that an unidentified female indigenous student had died at the school, and her burial place is unknown.

As Native American boarding schools run by religious organizations became less popular in the United States, the Office of Indian Affairs, later renamed the Bureau of Indian Affairs, began closing numerous schools. In 1896, the BIA bought the Mission from the Sisters and continued the school until the early 1909s, when the Federal Government transferred to the State of Minnesota, and the school became the West Central School of Agriculture in 1910. In 1960, the school again transformed to become the University of Minnesota Morris. She remained at the congregation in Oregon until her death on May 19, 1898. Lynch continued traveling and doing work elsewhere, missing the Jubilee of her career as a sister because she was traveling and caught in a snowstorm in Wyoming.

== Later life ==
After selling her school in Morris, Lynch and her sisters moved to Oregon City, Oregon, which later became Portland, at the request of Archbishop William Gross of the Diocese of Oregon City. Gross wanted Lynch and the members of her congregation to open a school for girls in the area, which Lynch and the sisters did. She did, however, stay with the congregation in Portland until her death on May 19, 1898.

== Controversy regarding Catholic Native American Boarding Schools ==
Though boarding schools for Native American students were considered acceptable in the nineteenth century, much scholarship in the late twentieth and early twenty-first century discusses the abusive nature of these schools. In July 2022, Pope Francis apologized to the Indigenous Peoples of Canada for the Church's role in these schools.
