= Minnesota Morris Cougars football =

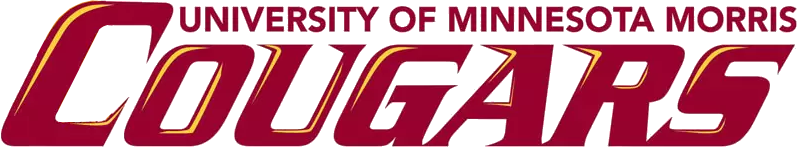
- First season: 1961; 65 years ago
- Athletic director: Matt Johnson
- Head coach: Marty Hoffmann; 9th season, 27–46 (.370)
- Location: Morris, Minnesota
- Stadium: Big Cat Stadium (capacity: 1,400)
- NCAA division: Division III
- Conference: UMAC
- Colors: Maroon and gold
- All-time record: 261–335–8 (.439)
- Bowl record: 2–3 (.400)

Conference championships
- 10
- Consensus All-Americans: 1
- Fight song: Minnesota Rouser
- Mascot: Pounce the Cougar
- Outfitter: Under Armour
- Website: morriscougars.com/football

The Minnesota Morris Cougars football program represents the University of Minnesota Morris in college football at the NCAA Division III level. The football program was founded in 1961, a year after the University of Minnesota Morris was established. Minnesota Morris first joined NCAA Division II Northern Sun Intercollegiate Conference (NSIC) in 1966. With a conference record of 0–34 from 1999 to 2002, Minnesota Morris decided to join NCAA Division III Upper Midwest Athletic Conference (UMAC). Since joining the UMAC in 2003, Minnesota Morris' conference record is 55–77. The Cougars claim eight NSIC titles (two of which were later forfeited) and two UMAC titles: 1970, 1975, 1976, 1977, 1978, 1984, 1986*, 1987*, 2006, and 2023. Since 2006, the Cougars have played all their home games at Big Cat Stadium in Morris, Minnesota. The team's current head coach is Marty Hoffmann.

== History ==
The Minnesota Morris Cougars football team played its first game in the fall of 1961, a 6–3 victory over North Dakota State College of Science under head coach Bruce Rolloff. Minnesota Morris has played against Bemidji State University 39 times, more than any other team in Cougar history. The two teams have not faced each other since 2002, Minnesota Morris' last year in Division II before dropping down. Head Coach Al Molde led the Cougars to more conference titles than any other head coach in Minnesota Morris history, winning four consecutively from 1975 to 1978. The Cougars were unstoppable from 1975 to 1981, posting a 61–12–3 record under head coaches Al Molde and Dick Smith. Minnesota Morris then experienced a painful decline from 1990 to 2002, after winning just 16 of 130 games, causing them to drop to Division III in 2003. A 2001 April Fool's issue of The University Register made fun of the losing streak in football by reporting that the recruitment of a multi-talented player named Jesus Christ had put the coach in a bind, "since they have 22 positions that need help."

== All-time record vs. UMAC opponents ==
This is the Cougars football record against current Upper Midwest Athletic Conference opponents.

School	Total Games	W	L	Pct.	PF	PA	First year	Streak
Greenville	9	3	6	.333	x	x	2011	Lost 1
Northwestern	19	4	15	.211	x	x	2003	Won 1
Finlandia	2	2	0	1.000	x	x	2021	Won 2
Crown	16	11	5	.688	x	x	2003	Won 2
Westminster	12	5	7	.417	x	x	2009	Won 1
Martin Luther	22	4	18	.182	x	x	2003	Lost 6
6 Opponents	79	28	51	.354	x	x	2003	19 Seasons

== Conference titles ==
Season	Coach	Conference	Record
1970†	Mike Simpson	Northern Sun Intercollegiate Conference	5–1
1975	Al Molde	Northern Sun Intercollegiate Conference	6–0
1976	Al Molde	Northern Sun Intercollegiate Conference	7–0
1977	Al Molde	Northern Sun Intercollegiate Conference	7–0
1978	Al Molde	Northern Sun Intercollegiate Conference	8–0
1984†	Jim Lind	Northern Sun Intercollegiate Conference	5–1
1986*	Jim Lind	Northern Sun Intercollegiate Conference	4–0–2
1987*	Stan Zweifel	Northern Sun Intercollegiate Conference	5–1
2006	Ken Crandall	Upper Midwest Athletic Conference	7–0
2023	Marty Hoffmann	Upper Midwest Athletic Conference	5–0

† Co-champions

*The 1986 and 1987 championships were later forfeited for use of an ineligible player.

== Playoff appearances ==
=== NCAA Division III ===
The Cougars have appeared in the Division III playoffs six times, with an overall record of 3–6.

Year	Round	Opponent	Result
1977	Quarterfinals; Semifinals	Albion; Wabash	W, 13–10; L, 21–37
1978	Quarterfinals; Semifinals	St. Olaf; Wittenberg	W, 23–10; L, 14–35
1979	Quarterfinals	Carnegie Mellon	L, 25–31
1980	Quarterfinals; Semifinals	Dubuque; Ithaca	W, 41–35; L, 0–36
1981	Quarterfinals	Lawrence	L, 14–21 ^{OT}
2023	First Round	Wisconsin–La Crosse	L, 7–62
