= Dana Veth =

Bahamian footballer

Personal information
- Full name: Dana Matthew Veth
- Date of birth: September 1, 1987 (age 39)
- Place of birth: Nassau, Bahamas
- Height: 6 ft 2 in (1.88 m)
- Position: Defender

Youth career
- New Castle FC

Senior career*
Years	Team	Apps	(Gls)
2006	Bowling Green Falcons	7	(0)
2007–2009	UMM Cougar	35	(3)

International career
2006–2007	Bahamas U20	6	(1)
2007	Bahamas U23	3	(1)
2008–	Bahamas	4	(0)

Managerial career
- 2007: BFA National Academy
- 2008: Blaine Tiger Tales Bengals
- 2010–2013: Spring Hill Badgers (Assistant coach)
- * Club domestic league appearances and goals

Dana Matthew Veth (born 1 September 1987) is a Bahamian former footballer.

== Early life ==
Veth was born in the Bahamas but has dual American-Bahamian citizenship. His father is from Minnesota, his mother is Bahamian.

== Club career ==
He played one season for the Bowling Green Falcons, then transferred to UW-Green Bay in the off-season. The following year he joined the University of Minnesota Morris team. Veth also worked at the 2010 Total Performance Soccer Camp in Minnesota.

== International career ==
When still at Blaine High School, Veth earned a call-up to the Bahamas U-20 team.

Veth made his debut for the Bahamas in a March 2008 World Cup qualification match against the British Virgin Islands. He also played in the return match, making it two caps in total, scoring no goals.

In 2011, Veth joined the national team once again to compete in preliminary World Cup qualifying rounds. As captain, he led the team to two victories over Turks and Caicos Islands national football team. Even though the team earned a place to advance, the country decided to opt out of further competition, ending their World Cup run.

== Coaching career ==
In September 2010 was named as the assistant coach of the Spring Hill Badgers Women Soccer team.
