= Crown College (Minnesota) =

Christian college in Minnesota, U.S.

Coordinates: 44.88513°N 93.74235°W

- Former name: List: The Alliance Training Home (1911–1922); St. Paul Training School of the Christian Missionary Alliance (1922–1936); St. Paul Bible Institute (1936–1959); St. Paul Bible College (1959–1992)
- Motto: Called to Serve. Prepared to Lead.
- Type: Private college
- Established: 1916; 110 years ago
- Religious affiliation: Christian and Missionary Alliance
- President: Andrew Denton
- Faculty: 81
- Students: 1,320
- Location: St. Bonifacius postal address, Minnesota, United States
- Campus: 215 acres (87 ha) on Lake Parley
- Nickname: Polars
- Sporting affiliations: NCAA Division III – UMAC
- Website: crown.edu
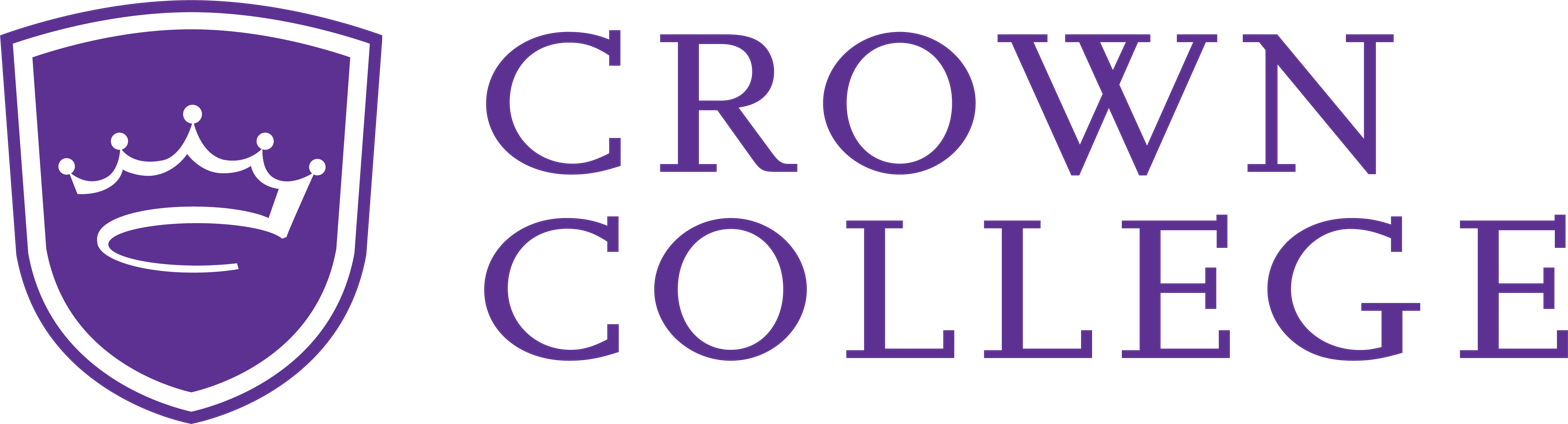

Crown College is a private Evangelical Christian college in Laketown Township, Carver County, Minnesota, United States, near St. Bonifacius. It is affiliated with the Christian and Missionary Alliance and is accredited by the Higher Learning Commission.

== History ==
In 1916, "The Alliance Training Home" was founded by Rev. J.D. Williams in St. Paul, Minnesota. The initial class at the school was five graduates. In 1922, the name was changed to the "St. Paul Training School of the Christian Missionary Alliance". In 1935, the school moved from Sherburne Avenue to Englewood Avenue, and in 1936 the name was changed again to the "St. Paul Bible Institute". In 1956, St. Paul Bible added Men's Basketball and began their athletic program; in 1958, the school added a women's basketball program. In 1959, the name changed a fourth time to "St. Paul Bible College".

In 1963, some open property in the St. Paul suburb of Arden Hills, about five miles north of the existing campus came to the attention of the college's leadership. The board studied the site and in 1963 purchased 35 acres of land for $70,000 with the intent to build a new campus on it. Plans were developed for the construction of a new campus, including a long, curving academic-administrative-gymnasium building, four tear-shaped dorms, and a circular chapel. However, due to high interest rates, a lot of capital was needed to begin construction, and construction never began.

The college, looking for a new home, finalized a deal to buy a Jesuit college with the main building in the shape of a cross in the St. Bonifacius, Minnesota area. The deal was completed in September 1969, when St. Paul Bible College bought the 173-acre campus for $3.1 million on an 8% contract for deed. In the autumn of 1970, St. Paul Bible College moved onto the land. This remains the main campus for Crown.

In 1984, St. Paul Bible College added a collegiate football program. In 1992, the college made its last name change to its current name, Crown College. In 2013, the college announced that Joel Wiggins would be the school's 16th president and he remains the school's president.

== Academics ==
Crown College offers over 40 undergraduate degree programs in numerous fields of study. The School of Online Studies and Graduate School offers over 20 different degree programs that can be completed entirely online including several Bible certificates.

The college is accredited by the Higher Learning Commission. Its nursing programs are also accredited by the Commission on Collegiate Nursing Education.

== Campus ==
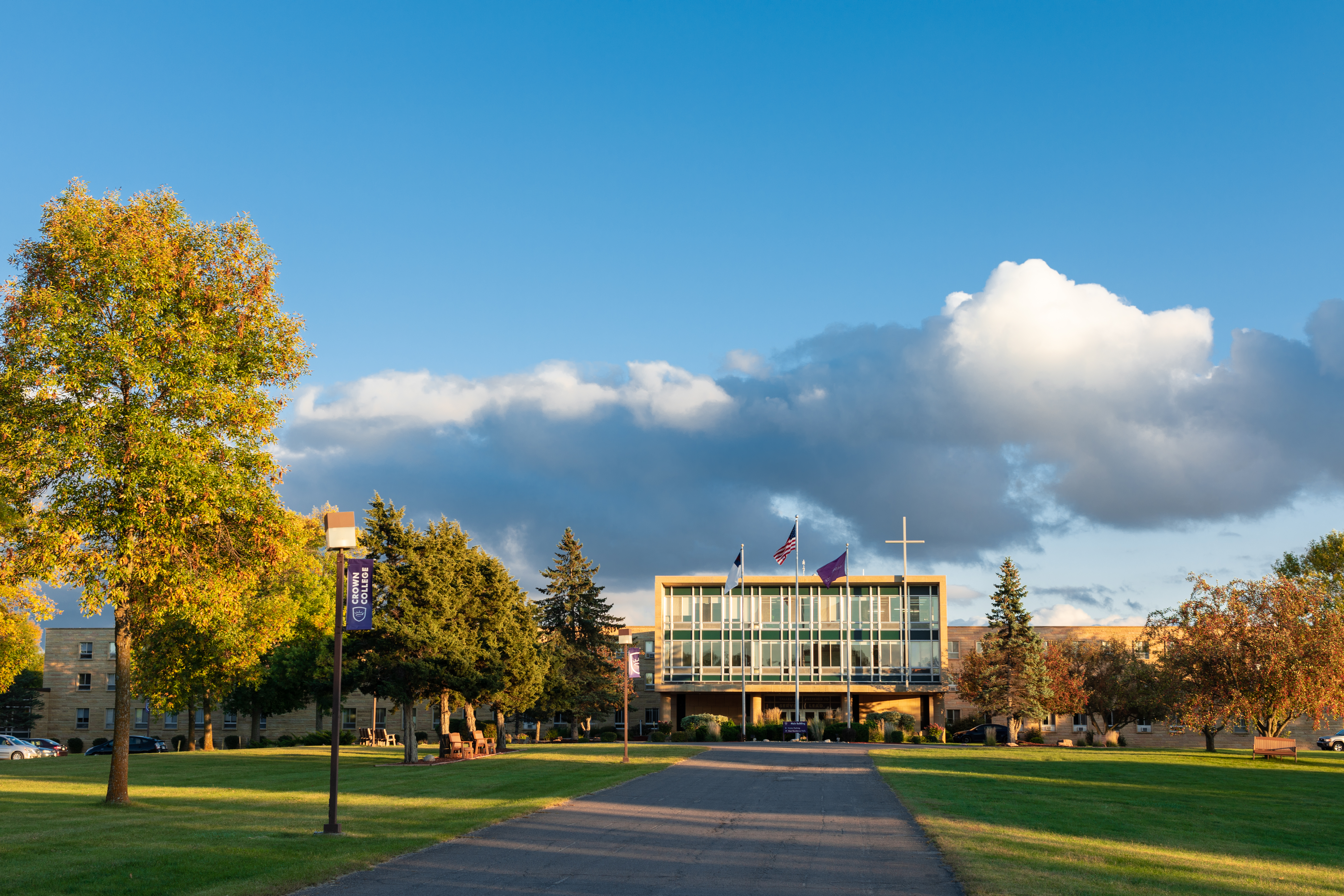
College campus in 2018

Crown College is situated on a 215-acre (87 ha) campus, in Laketown Township, Carver County, near the communities of Waconia, Minnetrista, and St. Bonifacius. It is along Parley Lake.

Prior to occupying its current campus in June 1970, the college had been located within the city of St. Paul and occupied several buildings in the block northeast of the intersection of Englewood Avenue and Albert Street. The old campus's Bethany Hall and library/classroom building remain, and part of the site is now occupied by the Friends School of Minnesota.

The Crown College campus area is a census-designated place (CDP); it first appeared as a CDP in the 2020 Census with a population of 367.

== Student life ==
Crown emphasizes a distinctly Christian culture. Its statement of faith, which all faculty and students must sign, requires everyone at the school "to put away behaviors such as abusive anger, malice, jealousy, lust, sexually immoral behavior (e.g., all sexual relations outside the bounds of marriage between a man and a woman), impure desires, prejudice (based on race, gender, or socioeconomic status), greed, idolatry, slander, profanity, lying, drunkenness, stealing, and dishonesty (1 Corinthians 6:9-11; Galatians 5:19-21)."

=== Extracurricular activities ===
There is a professional disc golf course on campus. Established in 2007, the 18 hole course has a "good mix of open and wooded holes along with a little water hazard on two holes. Some of the shortest (height) baskets you will ever see." The target type is mach5 and the tee type is concrete. Six holes are under 300 ft, 8 are 300–400 ft, and 4 are over 400 ft in length.

== Athletics ==
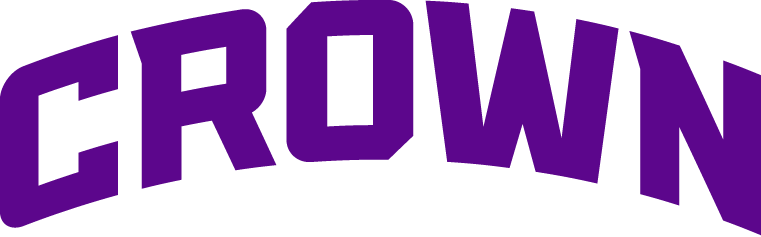
Crown athletics wordmark

The Crown College Polars are a member of the NCAA Division III and the National Christian College Athletic Association and compete in the Upper Midwest Athletic Conference (UMAC). Crown is the UMAC's second-longest tenured school and has been with the UMAC for the conference's entire NCAA-era (since the 2008–2009 season). Prior to 2002 the school's nickname was the Crusaders. The teams were then named the Storm before Crown began phasing in the Polars theme with a polar bear logo in 2020 and an official nickname change in 2022.

The Polars have won nine UMAC Championships since 2008. With two in Women's Outdoor Track and Field (2025, 2026), two in Women's Indoor Track and Field (2025, 2026), one in Football (2025), two in Baseball (2022, 2024), and two in Men's Golf (2014, 2015). Crown also won four NCCAA DII National Championships. Two in Women's Cross Country (2024, 2025), one in Men's Basketball (2023–24) and one in Women's Basketball (2025–26).

=== Sports ===
Crown College has 18 teams competing. They are baseball, basketball (m/w), cross country (m/w), football, golf (m/w), soccer (m/w), softball, tennis (m/w), indoor track and field (m/w), outdoor track and field (m/w), and volleyball

=== Facilities ===
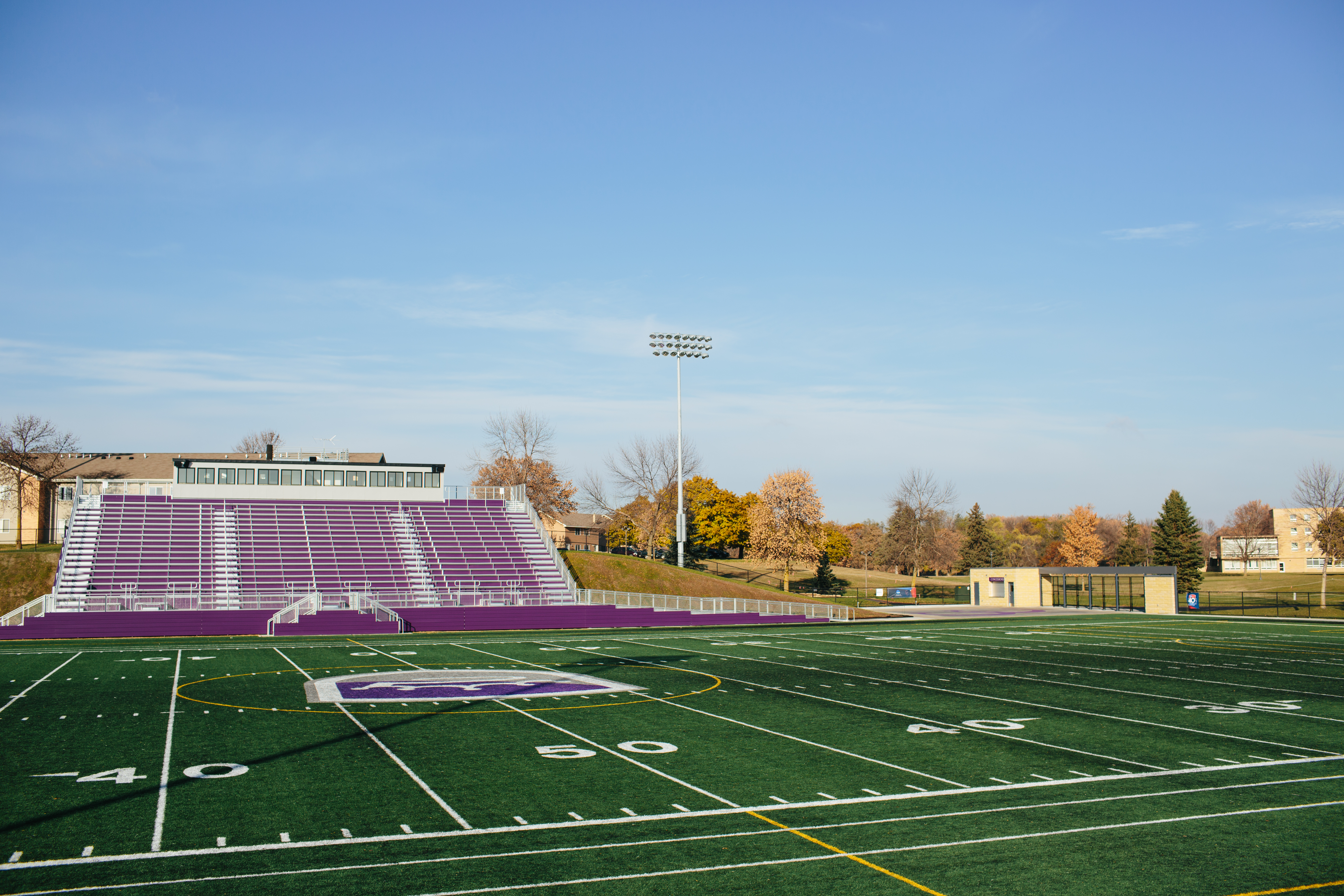
Old National Bank Stadium, venue for Crown's football and soccer teams

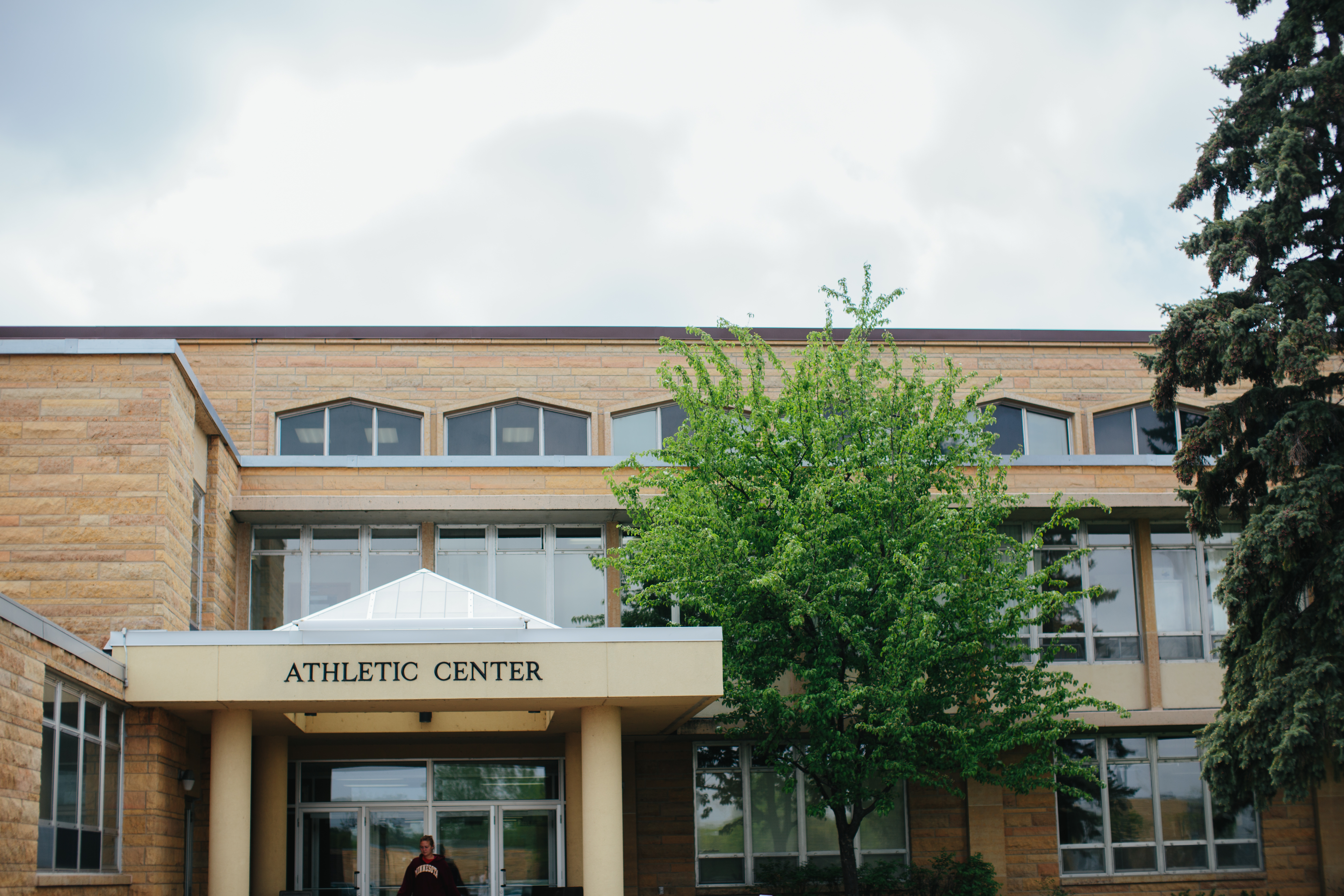
Teal Athletic Center, venue for basketball and volleyball teams

Old National Bank Stadium, a $2.4 million, 1,400-seat stadium, is the home of the school's football and soccer teams and opened during the 2013 football season.

Basketball teams and volleyball teams play at the Teal Athletic Center located in Crown's main building. The Polars also have an on-campus softball field, cross country course, multiple practice fields, and a weight room/fitness center. Crown College also has its own Human Performance Lab.

== Notable alumni ==
- Peggy Bennett, Minnesota state legislator
- Mike Nawrocki, co-creator and writer of Veggie Tales, did not graduate.
- Phil Vischer, co-creator and writer of Veggie Tales, did not graduate.
- BigXthaPlug, rapper, did not graduate.

== See also ==
- List of colleges and universities in Minnesota
- Higher education in Minnesota
