= KUMM =

Radio station in Minnesota, United States

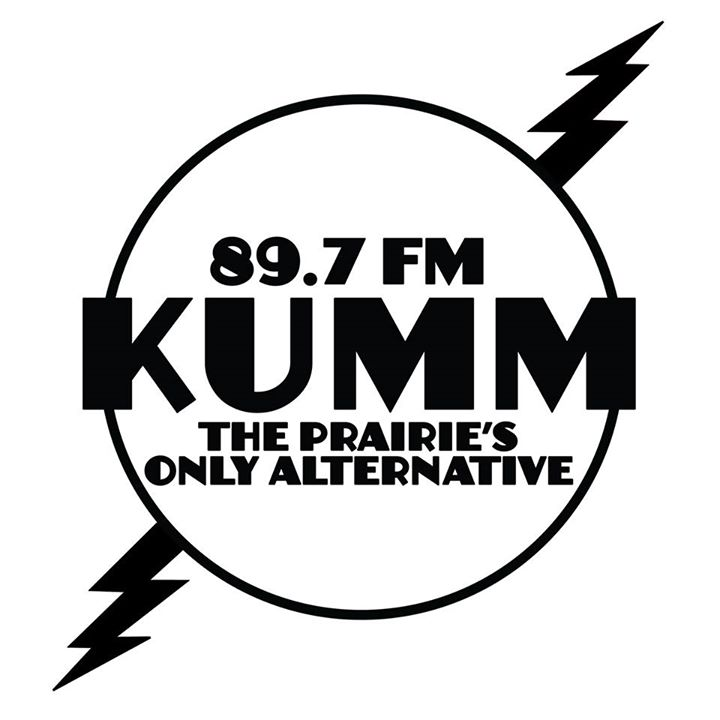
- Morris, Minnesota; United States
- Broadcast area: Stevens County, Minnesota
- Frequency: 89.7 MHz
- Branding: U-90

Programming
- Language: English
- Format: College alternative
- Affiliations: AMPERS

Ownership
- Owner: University of Minnesota Morris
- Sister stations: KUOM

History
- First air date: September 17, 1972
- Call sign meaning: University of Minnesota Morris

Technical information
- Licensing authority: FCC
- Facility ID: 69219
- Class: A
- ERP: 700 watts
- HAAT: 38 meters (125 ft)
- Transmitter coordinates: 45°35′11″N 95°53′57″W

Links
- Public license information: Public file; LMS
- Webcast: Listen Live

KUMM (89.7 FM, "U-90") is an American non-commercial educational radio station licensed to serve the community of Morris, the county seat of Stevens County, Minnesota. Established in 1970, the station is owned and operated by the University of Minnesota Morris.

== Programming ==
KUMM broadcasts a college radio/alternative rock music format to the greater Stevens County area. The station is a member of AMPERS, the state's network of independent community radio stations. The station also airs programming produced by local volunteers as well as the university's students.

== History ==
KUMM began licensed broadcast operations on September 17, 1972, with 10 watts of effective radiated power (ERP) from an antenna 21.3 meters (70 ft) in height above average terrain. The station was assigned the call sign "KUMM" by the Federal Communications Commission (FCC).

In May 1981, KUMM was granted a construction permit to increase power to 223 watts and lower its antenna to 17.3 meters (57 ft). The station began licensed operation at the new parameters on December 15, 1983.

In September 2002, KUMM applied for a new construction permit to further expand the station's coverage area. The application sought to raise the antenna to 38 meters (125 ft) and increase the ERP to 3,000 watts. A 2009 amendment to that application reduced the requested power to 700 watts. KUMM began licensed operation at these new parameters on October 15, 2009.
