= University of Minnesota Morris =

Public college in Morris, Minnesota, US

- Motto: A renewable, sustainable education
- Type: Public liberal arts college, Native American-serving nontribal institution
- Established: 1960
- Parent institution: University of Minnesota system
- Academic affiliations: Council of Public Liberal Arts Colleges
- Endowment: $27.7 million
- Chancellor: Michael C. Rodriguez
- Students: 1,042
- Location: Morris, Minnesota, United States
- Campus: Rural
- Colors: Maroon & gold
- Nickname: Cougars
- Sporting affiliations: NCAA Division III – UMAC
- Mascot: Pounce the Cougar
- Website: morris.umn.edu
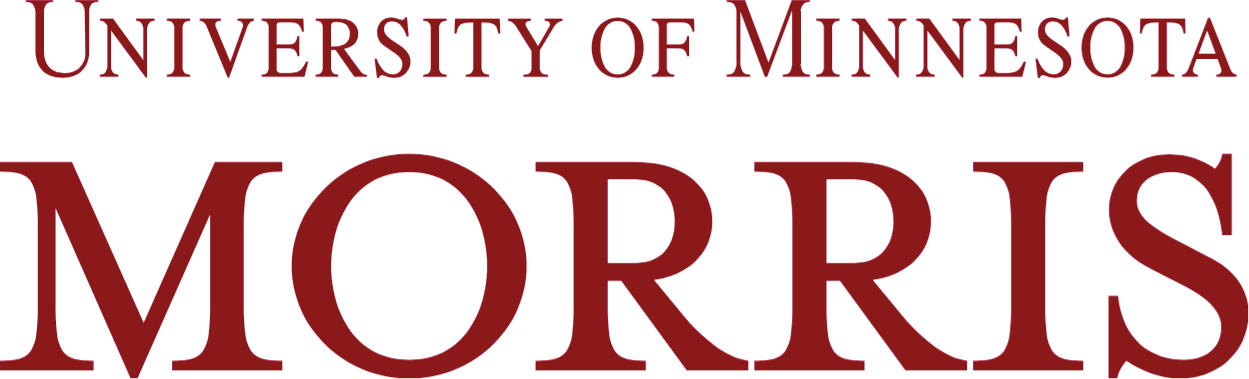

The University of Minnesota Morris (UMN–Morris) is a public liberal arts college in Morris, Minnesota, United States. It is part of the University of Minnesota system and was founded in 1960 as a public, co-educational, residential liberal arts college offering Bachelor of Arts degrees.

== History ==
- West Central School of Agriculture and Experiment Station Historic District
- U.S. National Register of Historic Places
- U.S. Historic district
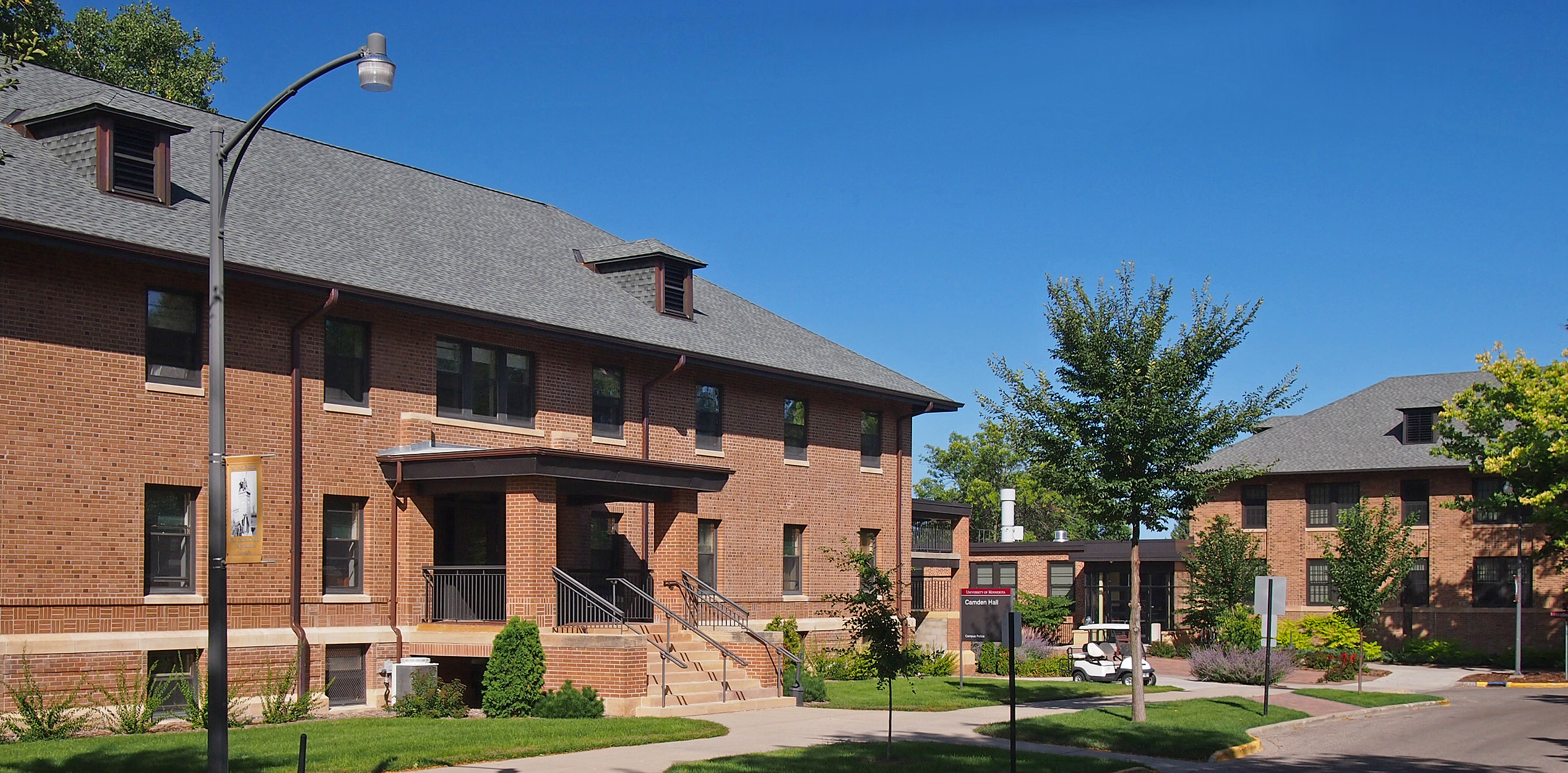
- The former Girls' Dormitory (left) and Agricultural Hall (right)

- Location within Minnesota Location within the United States
- Location: 600 East 4th Street, Morris, Minnesota
- Coordinates: 45°35′25″N 95°54′0″W
- Area: 42 acres (17 ha)
- Built: 1899–1929
- Architects: Clarence H. Johnston Sr., et al.
- Architectural style: Bungalow/Craftsman
- NRHP reference No.: 02001707
- Designated HD: January 15, 2003

Although UMN Morris officially opened its doors in 1960, the history of what became the current institution reaches to 1887. That year, the first building of the Morris Industrial School for Indians, an American Indian boarding school founded by Mother Mary Joseph Lynch, was constructed on the site and run by the Roman Catholic Sisters of Mercy under contract to the US government. Beginning in 1898, the Office of Indian Affairs (today's Bureau of Indian Affairs) took over operations to introduce a more progressive curriculum. The school closed in 1909, under a congressionally authorized program to reduce the number of boarding schools in preference for locating schools on reservations, so that families and communities would not be broken up. The campus was transferred to the State of Minnesota under the agreement that American Indians would always be admitted free of tuition; the current UMN Morris still follows this policy.

In 1910 the University of Minnesota established a coeducational residential high school on the campus called the West Central School of Agriculture (WCSA). This was one of four such schools established by the university in outstate Minnesota to provide agricultural and home economics education to rural youth. The complex also included an agricultural research station. The WCSA operated for half a century, but declining enrollment in the late 1950s prompted the University of Minnesota to phase out its regional agricultural schools. The residents of the Morris region convinced the university to develop the campus as a four-year college. The University of Minnesota Morris opened in September 1960, phasing in college classes year by year while phasing out the last high school class, which graduated in 1963.

The only surviving building from the Morris Industrial School for Indians, an 1899 dormitory, was listed on the National Register of Historic Places in 1984. The oldest building on campus, it now serves as UMN Morris's Multi-Ethnic Resource Center. In 2003 a historic district consisting of the dormitory and 10 buildings from the WCSA period was listed on the National Register as the West Central School of Agriculture and Experiment Station Historic District. It was listed for having national significance in the themes of agriculture and education. The district was nominated for being an excellent example of a residential agricultural high school, one of the longest running in the nation and one of the most intact. It was also a significant component of the University of Minnesota's nationally influential system of such facilities, and an important contributor to education and agriculture in west-central Minnesota.

The WCSA campus buildings were mostly designed by state architect Clarence H. Johnston Sr. in American Craftsman style and built in the 1910s and 20s. The 11 contributing properties of the historic district consist of the Music Hall (1899, previously the Indian School boys' dormitory and now the Multi-Ethnic Resource Center), the Girls' Dormitory (1912, now Camden Hall), Spooner Hall (1912–13), the Cattle Barn (1914, now the Saddle Club Barn), the Engineering Building (1915, now the Welcome Center), the Dining Hall (1918, now Behmler Hall), Senior Hall (1920, now Blakely Hall), Agricultural Hall (1920–21, now John Q. Imholte Hall), the Infirmary (1923–24, now the Education Building), Junior Hall (1926, now Pine Hall), and the Seed House (1929).

== Academics ==
Morris offers 35 majors and 32 minors, 13 education licensure areas, and nine pre-professional programs in education, the humanities, science and mathematics, and the social sciences.

According to U.S. News & World Report, the five most popular majors on campus are Psychology, General; English Language and Literature, General; Biology/Biological Sciences, General; Business Administration and Management, General; and Economics, General.

In 2025, U.S. News & World Report ranked UMN Morris 122nd in the "National Liberal Arts Colleges" list and #7 in "Top Public Schools" for Liberal Arts Colleges. Washington Monthly ranked UMN Morris the #15 "Best Bang for Your Buck" school in the Midwest in 2024.

== Music ==
The music discipline provides performing opportunities such as choir, symphonic winds, jazz ensembles, orchestra, and recitals.

The annual jazz festival was founded by Jim "Doc" Carlson in 1979. World-renowned jazz artists are invited to host clinics and master classes for high school, community, and college jazz ensemble. Each night of the festival concludes with performances by student jazz combos, ensembles, and the guest artists backed by Morris Jazz I.

== Green campus ==
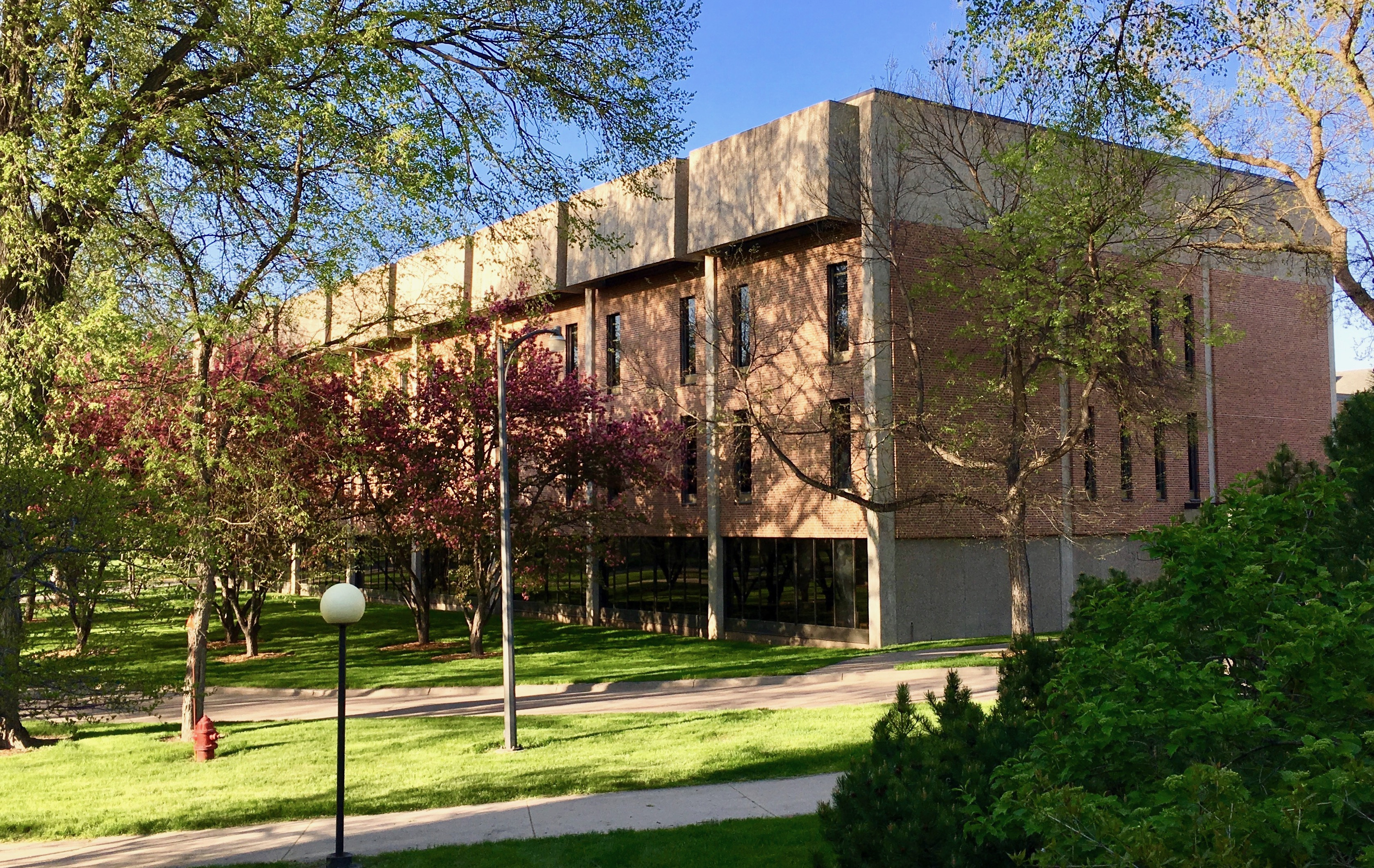
Briggs Library

Undergraduate demographics as of Fall 2023
Race and ethnicity	Total
White	52%
Two or more races	20%
American Indian/Alaska Native	13%
Hispanic	8%
International student	3%
Black	3%
Asian	1%
Unknown	1%
Economic diversity
Low-income (Note: The percentage of students who received an income-based federal Pell grant intended for low-income students.)	31%
Affluent (Note: The percentage of students who are a part of the American middle class at the bare minimum.)	69%

Morris is one of the first public colleges to generate on-site renewable power from local resources, such as corn stover. At the south edge of campus, a biomass gasification plant—fueled by crop residues from nearby farms—generates steam. The biomass gasifier is part of an integrated system for heating and cooling campus buildings. The combined heat and power system includes a steam turbine, which generates renewable electricity from gasifier steam, and a steam—powered absorption chiller.

At the campus's Regional Fitness Center, locally manufactured solar thermal panels collect the sun's energy to heat swimming pool water. A solar photovoltaic system on the south side of the science building converts sunlight into electricity. On the glacial ridge overlooking the campus, two 1.65 megawatt wind turbines generate renewable electricity for the campus and the region. Shifting to renewable power is just one piece of the campus's comprehensive sustainability strategy. Other measures include historic building reuse, green building design and construction, conservation, local foods programs, hybrid vehicles, innovative curriculum, and community outreach.

In August 2013 the University of Minnesota Morris opened the Green Prairie Living and Learning Community. Construction on the building began in December 2012. The building is designed to house 72 students including 4 community advisors and a hall director. The building will house students during summer for special events and camps. There are kitchen facilities, a central lounge and patio, and study space. The Green Prairie Living and Learning Community was designed to meet Minnesota B3 sustainability guidelines and LEED Gold certification. It is constructed with high thermal mass insulated concrete forms (ICF) to prevent winter heat loss and summer heat gain. This is the first Residence Hall on the Morris campus to have suites.

In 2019, UMN Morris was ranked as the #1 campus in the United States for most renewable electricity generated on campus per full-time equivalent (FTE) student by Environment America.

== Athletics ==
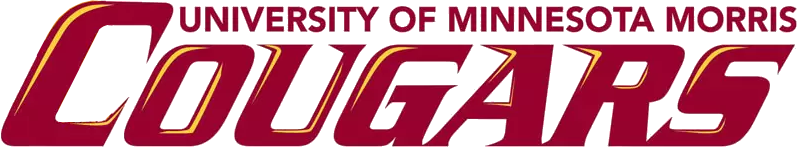
Minnesota Morris athletics wordmark

Minnesota–Morris (UMM) athletic teams are the Cougars. The university is a member of the Division III level of the National Collegiate Athletic Association (NCAA), primarily competing in the Upper Midwest Athletic Conference (UMAC) since the 2003–04 academic year. The Cougars previously competed in the Northern Sun Intercollegiate Conference (NSIC) of the NCAA Division II ranks from 1966–67 to 2002–03.

Minnesota–Morris competes in 17 intercollegiate varsity sports: Men's sports include baseball, basketball, cross country, football, golf, soccer, swimming & diving, and track & field; women's sports include basketball, cross country, golf, soccer, softball, swimming & diving, tennis, track & field and volleyball.

=== History ===
UMN Morris's athletic teams have experienced varied success during the school's history. The 1970s were marked by success in basketball and football. Olympic wrestler, Dennis Koslowski, wrestled for the Cougars in the early 1980s. In the early 1990s as a non-scholarship Division II, Cougar athletics found a more appropriate home in the UMAC of NCAA Division III. They are the first member of the UMAC to be a public, state-supported institution – all other members over the years were private institutions, usually with a religious affiliation.

In 1993, UMN Morris was the first college in the United States to sponsor women's wrestling as an official varsity sport. The wrestling programs were cut in 2003 due to budget constraints. In 2006, a new men's soccer team was announced.

=== Football ===
In 2006, UMN Morris opened a new football stadium named Big Cat Stadium, just south of the school's Regional Fitness Center. BCS is also used by the Morris Area High School Tigers. The new stadium replaced Cougar Field which had been used from 1970 to 2005. The school's first football field, named Miller Field, was used from 1961 to 1969.

In 2006, the Minnesota Morris Cougars football team captured their first UMAC championship in the Hubert H. Humphrey Metrodome signaling the end of coach Ken Crandall's coaching career at UMNM. The last conference title for the Cougar football program was the Northern Intercollegiate Conference (NIC) title in 1987, the second of two straight NIC titles. Over the next three years, the Cougars suffered losing records under coach Todd Hickman. In 2010, the team overcame their preseason rating (tied for last) to end the season with a winning record (5–4) and ending in a three-way tie for 3rd in the conference. 2016 record (4-6) 2017 record (6-4), undefeated at home.

== Media ==
University students operate the radio station "the U-90 alternative, the prairie's only alternative" 89.7 FM (KUMM). The university produces a television program that airs on PBS stations in the state. Pioneer Public Television carries Prairie Yard and Garden. UMN Morris also has a student-run publication, The University Register, a newspaper which is published weekly.

== Residence halls ==
The residence halls on campus are:

- Clayton A. Gay Hall (Gay Hall) – Upperclassmen residence hall. Also home to Student Health Services and the Office of Residential Life (ORL).
- David C. Johnson Independence Hall (Indy Hall) – Underclassmen residence hall
- Pine Hall – Underclassmen residence hall
- Blakely Hall – Upperclassmen residence hall (inactive during the 2013–2014 year)
- Spooner Hall – Underclassmen residence hall
- On-Campus Apartments – Upperclassmen apartment housing
- Green Prairie Living and Learning Community – Underclassmen and upperclassmen residence hall and suites

== Notable people ==
=== Alumni ===
- Rachel Brand – Associate Attorney General of the United States
- Lorie Skjerven Gildea 1983 – Chief Justice for Minnesota Supreme Court
- Dennis Koslowski 1981 – chiropractor
- Matt Little – mayor of Lakeville and Minnesota State Senator
- Sara McMann (attended 1998–1999) – 2004 Olympic silver medalist in women's freestyle wrestling and professional mixed martial arts fighter
- Earl B. Olson 1932 – founder and chairman of Jennie-O Turkey Company
- Monti Ossenfort 1999 – general manager of the NFL's Arizona Cardinals
- Erick Rowan, real name Joseph Ruud – professional wrestler
- Cy Thao 1995 – member of the State of Minnesota House of Representatives
- Dana Veth 2006 – Bahamian footballer
- Matthew Laur 2021 - Professional football player in the GFL, AIF, and IFA.

=== Faculty ===
- Vicente Cabrera Funes – author
- John Stuart Ingle – artist
- PZ Myers – biologist and atheist blogger

== See also ==
- List of colleges and universities in Minnesota
- Higher education in Minnesota
