= Upper Midwest Athletic Conference =

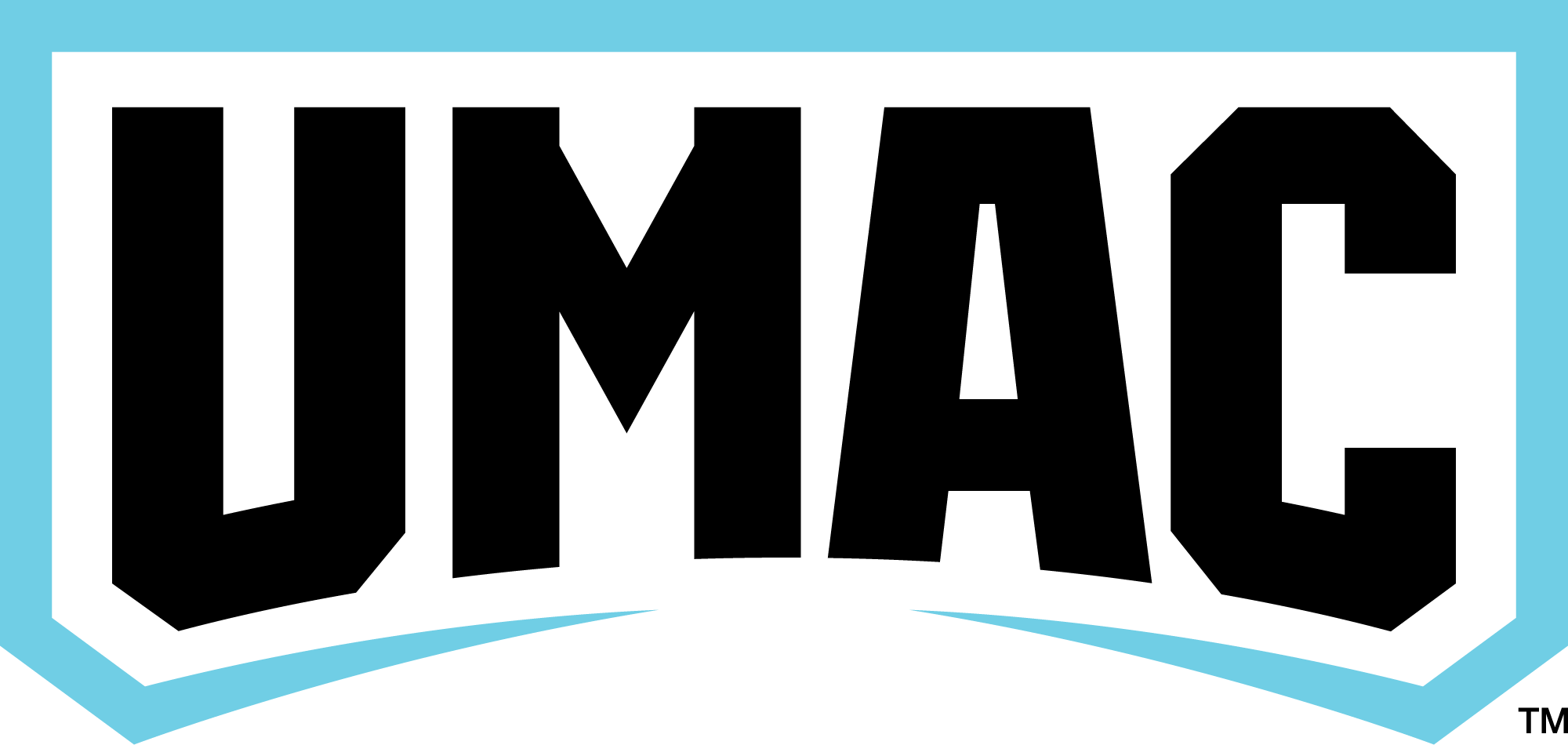
- Formerly: Twin Rivers Conference (1972–1983)
- Association: NCAA
- Founded: 1972; 54 years ago
- Commissioner: Mark Becker (since 2026)
- Sports fielded: 18; men's: 9; women's: 9
- Division: Division III
- No. of teams: 7 full, 2 associate
- Headquarters: Saint Paul, Minnesota
- Region: Upper Midwest
- Website: umacathletics.com

Locations

The Upper Midwest Athletic Conference (UMAC) is an intercollegiate athletic conference that competes in the National Collegiate Athletic Association (NCAA) Division III since the 2008–09 season. Mark Becker replaced Corey Borchardt as Commissioner in July 2026 after Borchardt became the first full-time leader of the conference in 2008. The UMAC was started in 1972 as the Twin Rivers Conference, and assumed its current name in 1983. Member institutions are located in Minnesota and Wisconsin.

The UMAC sponsors intercollegiate competition in men's baseball, men's and women's basketball, men's and women's cross country, men's football, men's and women's golf, men's and women's soccer, women's softball, men's and women's tennis, men's and women's indoor and outdoor track and field, and women's volleyball.

Greenville College and Westminster College became associate members of the UMAC in football in 2009, followed by Finlandia University in 2021.

In March 2023, Finlandia announced it was closing.

== History ==
Upper Midwest Athletic Conference
Location of UMAC members: current

=== Chronological timeline ===
- 1972 – The UMAC was founded as the Twin Rivers Conference (TRC), originally an athletic conference affiliated with the National Association of Intercollegiate Athletics (NAIA). Charter members included Concordia College, Saint Paul (now Concordia University, Saint Paul), Dr. Martin Luther College, Loras College, Mount Senario College, Northwestern College of Minnesota (now the University of Northwestern – St. Paul), Northwestern College of Wisconsin and Pillsbury Baptist Bible College, beginning the 1972–73 academic year.
- 1974 – Maranatha Baptist Bible College (now Maranatha Baptist University) joined the TWC as an associate member for football in the 1974 fall season (1974–75 academic year).
- 1976 – Viterbo College (now Viterbo University) joined the TRC in the 1976–77 academic year.
- 1983 – The TRC was rebranded as the Upper Midwest Athletic Conference, beginning the 1983–84 academic year.
- 1986 – Loras left the UMAC to join the Iowa Intercollegiate Athletic Conference (IIAC) after the 1985–86 academic year.
- 1988 – Pillsbury Baptist Bible and Viterbo left the UMAC after the 1987–88 academic year.
- 1994 – Crown College joined the UMAC in the 1994–95 academic year.
- 1995:
  - Dr. Martin Luther and Northwestern (Wisc.) merged to become Martin Luther College. Both institutions therefore left the UMAC as a result of the merger, effective after the 1994–95 academic year. And immediately Martin Luther joined the UMAC, beginning the 1995–96 academic year.
  - The College of St. Scholastica joined the UMAC in the 1995–96 academic year.
- 1997 – Trinity Bible College joined the UMAC as an associate member for football in the 1997 fall season (1997–98 academic year).
- 1998 – Northland College of Wisconsin joined the UMAC in the 1998–99 academic year.
- 1999 – Concordia–Saint Paul left the UMAC to join Division II ranks of the National Collegiate Athletic Association (NCAA) and the Northern Sun Intercollegiate Conference (NSIC) after the 1998–99 academic year.
- 2002:
  - Mount Senario left the UMAC during the 2001–02 academic year; as the school disbanded its athletics program in December 2001 without completing the rest of the school year; which would the school later ceased operations on 31 August 2002.
  - Presentation College of South Dakota joined the UMAC in the 2002–03 academic year.
  - Blackburn College, Principia College, Rockford College (now Rockford University) and Westminster College of Missouri joined the UMAC as associate members for football in the 2002 fall season (2002–03 academic year).
- 2003 – The University of Minnesota at Morris (a.k.a. Minnesota–Morris) joined the UMAC in the 2003–04 academic year.
- 2004 – Bethany Lutheran College joined the UMAC in the 2004–05 academic year.
- 2008:
  - Blackburn, Principia, Maranatha Baptist, Rockford, Trinity Bible and Westminster (Mo.) left the UMAC as associate members for football after the 2007 fall season (2007–08 academic year).
  - The UMAC became affiliated with the NCAA Division III ranks, beginning the 2008–09 academic year.
  - North Central University joined the UMAC as an associate member for certain sports in the 2008–09 academic year.
- 2009 – Eureka College, Greenville College (now Greenville University) and MacMurray College joined the UMAC as associate members for football (with Westminster (Mo.) rejoining back) in the 2009 fall season (2009–10 academic year).
- 2012 – Presentation left the UMAC to join the NAIA as an Independent within the Association of Independent Institutions (AII) after the 2011–12 academic year; which would later join the North Star Athletic Association (NSAA), beginning the 2013–14 school year.
- 2013:
  - North Central (Minn.) became a full member of the UMAC for all sports in the 2013–14 academic year.
  - Iowa Wesleyan College (now Iowa Wesleyan University) joined the UMAC as an associate member for football in the 2013 fall season (2013–14 academic year).
- 2015 – The University of Wisconsin–Superior joined the UMAC in the 2015–16 academic year.
- 2018 – Eureka left the UMAC as an associate member for football after the 2017 fall season (2017–18 academic year).
- 2020 – MacMurray left the UMAC as an associate member for football after the 2019 fall season (2019–20 academic year); as the school would later drop its athletics program and cease operations.
- 2021:
  - Iowa Wesleyan left the UMAC as an associate member for football after the 2020 fall season (2020–21 academic year).
  - St. Scholastica left the UMAC to join the Minnesota Intercollegiate Athletic Conference (MIAC) after the 2020–21 academic year.
- 2021 – Finlandia University joined the UMAC as an associate member for football in the 2021 fall season (2021–22 academic year).
- 2023 – Finlandia left the UMAC as an associate member for football after the 2022 fall season (2022–23 academic year); as the school would later drop its athletics program and cease operations.
- 2025 – Northland left the UMAC after the 2024–25 academic year; as the school would cease operations.

== Member schools ==
=== Current members ===
==== Full members ====
The UMAC currently has seven full members, all but two are private schools:

Institution	Location	Founded	Affiliation	Enrollment	Nickname	Colors	Varsity teams	Joined (Note: Represents the calendar year when fall sports competition begins.)
Bethany Lutheran College	Mankato, Minnesota	1927	Lutheran ELS	856	Vikings		15	2004
Crown College	St. Bonifacius, Minnesota	1916	Christian and Missionary Alliance	1,846	Polars		18	1994
Martin Luther College	New Ulm, Minnesota	1995	Lutheran WELS	800	Knights		15	1995
University of Minnesota–Morris	Morris, Minnesota	1960	Public	981	Cougars		16	2003
North Central University	Minneapolis, Minnesota	1930	Assemblies of God	759	Rams		15	2013 (Note: North Central was an associate member for several sports from the 2008–09 to 2012–13 school years.)
University of Northwestern–Saint Paul	Roseville, Minnesota	1902	Nondenominational	3,163	Eagles		16	1972
University of Wisconsin–Superior	Superior, Wisconsin	1893	Public	3,022	Yellowjackets		15	2015

==== Associate members ====
The UMAC currently has five associate members, all but one are private schools:

Institution	Location	Founded	Affiliation	Enrollment	Nickname	Joined (Note: Represents the calendar year when fall sports competition begins.)	UMAC sport(s)	Primary conference
Greenville University	Greenville, Illinois	1892	Free Methodist	1,200	Panthers	2009	Football	St. Louis (SLIAC)
Greenville University	Greenville, Illinois	1892	Free Methodist	1,200	Panthers	2023	Men's tennis	St. Louis (SLIAC)
Greenville University	Greenville, Illinois	1892	Free Methodist	1,200	Panthers	2023	Women's tennis	St. Louis (SLIAC)
Mississippi University for Women (MUW)	Columbus, Mississippi	1884	Public	2,339	Owls	2023	Men's tennis	St. Louis (SLIAC)
Mississippi University for Women (MUW)	Columbus, Mississippi	1884	Public	2,339	Owls	2023	Women's tennis	St. Louis (SLIAC)
Principia College	Elsah, Illinois	1912	Scientist	323	Panthers	2023	Men's tennis	St. Louis (SLIAC)
Principia College	Elsah, Illinois	1912	Scientist	323	Panthers	2023	Women's tennis	St. Louis (SLIAC)
Webster University	Webster Groves, Missouri	1915	Catholic (Sisters of Loretto)	5,000	Gorloks	2023	Men's tennis	St. Louis (SLIAC)
Webster University	Webster Groves, Missouri	1915	Catholic (Sisters of Loretto)	5,000	Gorloks	2023	Women's tennis	St. Louis (SLIAC)
Westminster College	Fulton, Missouri	1851	Presbyterian	1,050	Blue Jays	2009 (Note: Westminster was formerly an associate member for football from the 2002 to 2007 fall seasons (2002–03 to 2007–08 school years).)	Football	St. Louis (SLIAC)
Westminster College	Fulton, Missouri	1851	Presbyterian	1,050	Blue Jays	2023	Men's tennis	St. Louis (SLIAC)
Westminster College	Fulton, Missouri	1851	Presbyterian	1,050	Blue Jays	2023	Women's tennis	St. Louis (SLIAC)

=== Former members ===
==== Full members ====
The UMAC had ten former full members, which all were private schools:

Institution	Location	Founded	Affiliation	Enrollment	Nickname	Joined (Note: Represents the calendar year when fall sports competition begins.)	Left (Note: Represents the calendar year when spring sports competition ends.)	Current conference
Concordia University, Saint Paul	St. Paul, Minnesota	1893	Lutheran LCMS	2,800	Golden Bears	1972	1999	Northern Sun (NSIC) (Note: Currently an NCAA Division II athletic conference.)
Dr. Martin Luther College	New Ulm, Minnesota	1884	Lutheran WELS	N/A	Lancers	1972	1995	N/A (Note: Dr. Martin Luther and Northwestern (Wis.) were merged to form Martin Luther College in 1995.)
Loras College	Dubuque, Iowa	1839	Catholic (Archdiocese of Dubuque)	1,610	Duhawks	1972	1986	American Rivers (ARC)
Mount Senario College	Ladysmith, Wisconsin	1930	Nonsectarian	N/A	Fighting Saints	1972	2002	N/A (Note: Mount Scenario disbanded its athletics program in December 2001 without completing the rest of the 2001–02 school year, before closing the school on August 31, 2002.)
Northwestern College (Wisconsin)	Watertown, Wisconsin	1865	Lutheran WELS	N/A	Trojans	1972	1995	N/A
Northland College	Ashland, Wisconsin	1892	United Church of Christ	262	LumberJacks & LumberJills	1998	2025	Closed in 2025
Pillsbury Baptist Bible College	Owatonna, Minnesota	1877	Independent Baptist	142	Comets	1972	1988	Closed in 2008
Presentation College	Aberdeen, South Dakota	1922	Catholic (Presentation Sisters)	786	Saints	2002	2012	Closed in 2023
The College of St. Scholastica	Duluth, Minnesota	1912	Catholic (Benedictines)	3,309	Saints	1995	2021	Minnesota (MIAC)
Viterbo University	La Crosse, Wisconsin	1890	Catholic (FSPA)	3,192	V-Hawks	1976	1988	Chicagoland (CCAC) (Note: Currently an NAIA athletic conference.)

==== Associate members ====
The UMAC had eight former associate members, all were private schools. School names and nicknames reflect those in use during the final school year in which each competed in the UMAC.

Institution	Location	Founded	Affiliation	Enrollment	Nickname	Joined (Note: Represents the calendar year when fall sports competition begins.)	Left (Note: Represents the calendar year when spring sports competition ends.)	UMAC sport(s)	Primary conference
Blackburn College	Carlinville, Illinois	1837	Presbyterian (PCUSA)	590	Beavers	2002	2008	Football	St. Louis (SLIAC)
Eureka College	Eureka, Illinois	1855	Disciples of Christ	680	Red Devils	2009	2018	Football	St. Louis (SLIAC)
Finlandia University	Hancock, Michigan	1896	Lutheran (ELCA)	507	Lions	2021	2023	Football	Closed in 2023
Iowa Wesleyan University	Mt. Pleasant, Iowa	1842	United Methodist	571	Tigers	2013	2021	Football	Closed in 2023
Maranatha Baptist Bible College (Note: Currently known as Maranatha Baptist University since 2013.)	Watertown, Wisconsin	1968	Baptist	950	Crusaders (Note: Maranatha Baptist changed its nickname from Crusaders to Sabercats in 2014.)	1974	2008	Football	D-III Independent
MacMurray College	Jacksonville, Illinois	1846	United Methodist	683	Highlanders	2009	2010	Football	Closed in 2020
Principia College	Elsah, Illinois	1910	Scientist	550	Panthers	2002	2008	Football	St. Louis (SLIAC)
Rockford College (Note: Currently known as Rockford University since 2013.)	Rockford, Illinois	1847	Nonsectarian	983	Regents	2002	2008	Football	Northern (NACC)
Trinity Bible College	Ellendale, North Dakota	1948	Assemblies of God	333	Lions	1997	2008	Football	NCCAA Independent

=== Membership timeline ===
Full member (all sports) Full member (non-football) Associate member (football) Associate member (sport)

== Conference sports ==
Conference sports
Sport	Men's	Women's
Baseball	✓	
Basketball	✓	✓
Cross country	✓	✓
Football	✓	
Golf	✓	✓
Indoor Track and field	✓	✓
Soccer	✓	✓
Softball		✓
Tennis	✓	✓
Track and field	✓	✓
Volleyball		✓

== Conference facilities ==
School	Football stadium	Capacity	Basketball arena	Capacity
Bethany Lutheran	Non-football school	N/A	Sports and Fitness Center	800
Crown	Old National Bank Stadium	1,400	Wild Athletic Center	700
Greenville	Francis Stadium	2,000	Football-only member	
Martin Luther	MLC Bowl	2,200	Luther Student Center	700
Minnesota–Morris	Big Cat Stadium	3,500	Cougar Sports Center (CSC)	4,000
North Central	Non-football school	N/A	Clark-Danielson Gymnasium	800
Northwestern	Reynolds Field	1,500	Ericksen Center	1,500
Westminster	Priest Field	1,000	Football-only member	
Wisconsin–Superior	Non-football school	N/A	Mertz Mortorelli Gymnasium	2,500

== Football champions ==
Year	Champion(s)
1974	Northwestern (MN)
1975	Northwestern (MN)
1976	Concordia-Saint Paul; Loras; Maranatha Baptist Bible College; Northwestern (MN); Northwestern (WI)
1977	Concordia-Saint Paul; Dr. Martin Luther College
1978	Northwestern (WI)
1979	Northwestern (MN)
1980	Mount Senario
1981	Concordia-Saint Paul; Northwestern (MN)
1982	Concordia-Saint Paul; Mount Senario; Northwestern (MN)
1983	Mount Senario; Northwestern (WI)
1984	Northwestern (MN)
1985	Mount Senario
1986	Northwestern (WI)
1987	Mount Senario
1988	Concordia-Saint Paul
1989	Mount Senario
1990	Maranatha Baptist Bible College; Northwestern (MN)
1991	Concordia-Saint Paul; Northwestern (WI)
1992	Mount Senario
1993	Mount Senario
1994	Mount Senario
1995	Northwestern
1996	Maranatha Baptist Bible College; Martin Luther
1997	Mount Senario
1998	Maranatha Baptist; Martin Luther; Mount Senario
1999	Mount Senario
2000	Mount Senario
2001	Northwestern
2002	Northwestern
2003	Westminster
2004	Westminster
2005	Northwestern
2006	Minnesota-Morris
2007	Northwestern
2008	Northwestern
2009	North Division: Martin Luther; South Division: Greenville
2010	Greenville
2011*	St. Scholastica
2012	Greenville; Northwestern; St. Scholastica
2013	St. Scholastica
2014	St. Scholastica
2015	St. Scholastica
2016	Northwestern
2017	Eureka
2018	Martin Luther
2019	Martin Luther
2020	No season COVID-19
2021	Greenville
2022	Northwestern
2023	Minnesota-Morris
2024	Northwestern
2025	Crown

*- 2011 was the first year the UMAC Champion received an automatic bid to the NCAA Division III Playoffs.

== Yearly football standings ==
2002 Upper Midwest Athletic Conference football standings
	Conf.			Overall
Team	W		L	W		L
North
Northwestern (MN) x	3	–	0	8	–	2
Martin Luther	2	–	1	6	–	3
Crown	1	–	2	2	–	7
Trinity Bible	0	–	3	0	–	9
South
Maranatha Baptist x	4	–	0	6	–	3
Westminster (MO)	3	–	1	7	–	2
Principia	2	–	2	5	–	4
Rockford	1	–	3	4	–	6
Blackburn	0	–	4	1	–	8
x – Division champion/co-champions

2003 Upper Midwest Athletic Conference football standings
	Conf.			Overall
Team	W		L	W		L
North
Martin Luther x	5	–	2	7	–	2
Northwestern (MN) x	5	–	2	6	–	4
Minnesota Morris	4	–	2	5	–	6
Crown	3	–	4	4	–	7
Trinity Bible	0	–	7	0	–	9
South
Westminster (MO) x$	7	–	0	7	–	2
Rockford	5	–	1	7	–	3
Principia	2	–	5	3	–	6
Maranatha Baptist	2	–	5	2	–	7
Blackburn	1	–	6	2	–	8
$ – Conference champion; x – Division champion/co-champions

2004 Upper Midwest Athletic Conference football standings
	Conf.			Overall
Team	W		L	W		L
North
Martin Luther x	6	–	1	6	–	3
Northwestern (MN) x	6	–	1	6	–	5
Minnesota Morris	4	–	3	5	–	5
Crown	2	–	5	2	–	7
Trinity Bible	0	–	7	0	–	9
South
Westminster (MO) x	6	–	1	6	–	3
Rockford	5	–	2	7	–	3
Blackburn	3	–	4	3	–	7
Principia	2	–	5	3	–	6
Maranatha Baptist	1	–	6	3	–	6
x – Division champion/co-champions

2005 Upper Midwest Athletic Conference football standings
	Conf.			Overall
Team	W		L	W		L
North
Northwestern (MN) xy$#	7	–	0	8	–	3
Martin Luther	6	–	1	6	–	3
Minnesota–Morris #	4	–	3	4	–	6
Crown #	3	–	4	3	–	6
Trinity Bible §	0	–	7	1	–	8
South
Rockford x	5	–	2	7	–	3
Westminster (MO) xy	5	–	2	5	–	5
Maranatha Baptist	2	–	5	4	–	5
Blackburn	2	–	5	2	–	8
Principia	1	–	6	1	–	8
Championship: Northwestern (MN) 27, Westminster (MO) 7
$ – Conference champion; x – Division champion/co-champions; y – Championship game participant; # – Provisional NCAA Division III member § – Not an NCAA member

2006 Upper Midwest Athletic Conference football standings
	Conf.			Overall
Team	W		L	W		L
North
Minnesota–Morris xy$#	7	–	0	7	–	3
Northwestern (MN) #	6	–	1	7	–	3
Crown #	2	–	5	3	–	6
Trinity Bible §	2	–	5	2	–	6
Martin Luther	2	–	5	2	–	8
South
Rockford xy	5	–	2	7	–	3
Maranatha Baptist	4	–	3	6	–	3
Westminster (MO)	4	–	3	4	–	5
Blackburn	3	–	4	3	–	7
Principia	0	–	7	0	–	9
Championship: Minnesota–Morris 27, Rockford 20
$ – Conference champion; x – Division champion/co-champions; y – Championship game participant; # – Provisional NCAA Division III member § – Not an NCAA member

2007 Upper Midwest Athletic Conference football standings
	Conf.			Overall
Team	W		L	W		L
North
Northwestern (MN) xy$#	7	–	0	7	–	2
Martin Luther	5	–	2	6	–	3
Crown #	4	–	3	5	–	3
Minnesota–Morris #	4	–	3	4	–	4
Trinity Bible §	1	–	6	1	–	8
South
Rockford xy	5	–	2	6	–	3
Westminster (MO)	4	–	3	4	–	5
Blackburn	3	–	4	3	–	6
Maranatha Baptist	1	–	6	2	–	7
Principia	1	–	6	1	–	8
Championship: Northwestern (MN) 28, Rockford 27
$ – Conference champion; x – Division champion/co-champions; y – Championship game participant; # – Provisional NCAA Division III member § – Not an NCAA member

2008 Upper Midwest Athletic Conference football standings
	Conf.			Overall
Team	W		L	W		L
Northwestern (MN) $	4	–	0	9	–	2
Crown	3	–	1	5	–	4
Martin Luther	2	–	2	7	–	3
Minnesota–Morris	1	–	3	3	–	6
St. Scholastica	0	–	4	1	–	7
$ – Conference champion

2009 Upper Midwest Athletic Conference football standings
	Conf.			Overall
Team	W		L	W		L
North
Martin Luther x	4	–	0	7	–	3
Northwestern (MN)	3	–	1	5	–	5
St. Scholastica	2	–	2	4	–	6
Crown	1	–	3	4	–	6
Minnesota–Morris	0	–	4	4	–	6
South
Greenville x	3	–	0	7	–	3
Westminster (MO)	2	–	1	5	–	5
Eureka	1	–	2	4	–	6
MacMurray	0	–	3	1	–	9
x – Division champion/co-champions

2010 Upper Midwest Athletic Conference football standings
	Conf.			Overall
Team	W		L	W		L
Greenville $	6	–	0	7	–	3
St. Scholastica	5	–	2	7	–	3
Crown	4	–	2	6	–	3
Martin Luther	4	–	2	5	–	4
Minnesota–Morris	4	–	2	4	–	4
Westminster (MO)	3	–	4	5	–	5
Eureka	2	–	5	2	–	8
Northwestern (MN)	1	–	5	1	–	8
MacMurray	0	–	7	0	–	10
$ – Conference champion

2011 Upper Midwest Athletic Conference football standings
	Conf.			Overall
Team	W		L	W		L
St. Scholastica $^	9	–	0	10	–	1
Westminster (MO)	7	–	2	8	–	2
Greenville	7	–	2	7	–	4
Northwestern (MN)	6	–	3	6	–	4
Minnesota–Morris	5	–	4	5	–	5
Eureka	4	–	5	4	–	6
Presentation	3	–	6	3	–	7
MacMurray	2	–	7	2	–	8
Martin Luther	2	–	7	2	–	8
Crown	0	–	9	0	–	10
$ – Conference champion; ^ – NCAA Division III playoff participant

2012 Upper Midwest Athletic Conference football standings
	Conf.			Overall
Team	W		L	W		L
Greenville +	7	–	1	8	–	2
Northwestern (MN) +	7	–	1	8	–	3
St. Scholastica +^	7	–	1	8	–	3
Minnesota–Morris	5	–	3	6	–	4
Eureka	3	–	5	4	–	6
Martin Luther	2	–	6	4	–	6
Westminster (MO)	2	–	6	4	–	6
MacMurray	2	–	6	2	–	8
Crown	1	–	7	2	–	8
+ – Conference co-champions; ^ – NCAA Division III playoff participant

2013 Upper Midwest Athletic Conference football standings
	Conf.			Overall
Team	W		L	W		L
St. Scholastica $^	9	–	0	9	–	2
Greenville	8	–	1	9	–	2
Eureka	7	–	2	8	–	2
Northwestern (MN)	6	–	3	6	–	4
Crown	4	–	5	4	–	6
Martin Luther	4	–	5	4	–	6
Minnesota–Morris	3	–	6	3	–	7
Iowa Wesleyan #	2	–	7	2	–	8
Westminster (MO)	2	–	7	2	–	8
MacMurray	0	–	9	0	–	10
$ – Conference champion; ^ – NCAA Division III playoff participant; # – Provisional NCAA Division III member

2014 Upper Midwest Athletic Conference football standings
	Conf.			Overall
Team	W		L	W		L
St. Scholastica $^	9	–	0	10	–	1
Northwestern (MN)	7	–	2	8	–	2
Greenville	7	–	2	7	–	3
Iowa Wesleyan #	6	–	3	6	–	4
Westminster (MO)	6	–	3	6	–	4
Crown	4	–	5	4	–	6
MacMurray	3	–	6	3	–	7
Eureka	2	–	7	2	–	8
Martin Luther	1	–	8	2	–	8
Minnesota–Morris	0	–	9	0	–	10
$ – Conference champion; ^ – NCAA Division III playoff participant; # – Provisional NCAA Division III member

2015 Upper Midwest Athletic Conference football standings
	Conf.			Overall
Team	W		L	W		L
St. Scholastica $^	9	–	0	9	–	2
Northwestern (MN)	8	–	1	8	–	3
Westminster (MO)	6	–	3	6	–	4
MacMurray	5	–	4	6	–	4
Eureka	4	–	5	5	–	5
Crown	4	–	5	4	–	6
Minnesota–Morris	4	–	5	4	–	6
Greenville	3	–	6	3	–	7
Martin Luther	1	–	8	2	–	8
Iowa Wesleyan #	1	–	8	1	–	9
$ – Conference champion; ^ – NCAA Division III playoff participant; # – Provisional NCAA Division III member

2016 Upper Midwest Athletic Conference football standings
	Conf.			Overall
Team	W		L	W		L
Northwestern (MN) $^	8	–	1	9	–	2
Eureka	7	–	2	8	–	2
MacMurray	7	–	2	8	–	2
St. Scholastica	7	–	2	7	–	3
Minnesota–Morris	5	–	4	6	–	4
Westminster (MO)	4	–	5	4	–	6
Iowa Wesleyan #	3	–	6	3	–	7
Crown	2	–	7	2	–	8
Greenville	2	–	7	2	–	8
Martin Luther	0	–	9	0	–	10
$ – Conference champion; ^ – NCAA Division III playoff participant; # – Provisional NCAA Division III member

2017 Upper Midwest Athletic Conference football standings
	Conf.			Overall
Team	W		L	W		L
Eureka $^	8	–	1	8	–	3
MacMurray	7	–	2	8	–	2
St. Scholastica	7	–	2	7	–	3
Northwestern (MN)	6	–	3	6	–	4
Westminster (MO)	6	–	3	6	–	4
Martin Luther	4	–	5	5	–	5
Greenville	4	–	5	4	–	6
Iowa Wesleyan #	2	–	7	2	–	8
Minnesota–Morris	1	–	8	1	–	9
Crown	0	–	9	0	–	10
$ – Conference champion; ^ – NCAA Division III playoff participant; # – Provisional NCAA Division III member

2018 Upper Midwest Athletic Conference football standings
	Conf.			Overall
Team	W		L	W		L
Martin Luther $^	8	–	0	9	–	2
MacMurray	7	–	1	7	–	2
St. Scholastica	6	–	2	6	–	4
Northwestern (MN)	5	–	3	5	–	5
Westminster (MO)	3	–	5	3	–	6
Greenville	3	–	5	3	–	7
Minnesota–Morris	3	–	5	3	–	7
Iowa Wesleyan	1	–	7	1	–	9
Crown	0	–	8	0	–	10
$ – Conference champion; ^ – NCAA Division III playoff participant

2019 Upper Midwest Athletic Conference football standings
	Conf.			Overall
Team	W		L	W		L
Martin Luther $^	8	–	0	9	–	2
Greenville	7	–	1	8	–	3
St. Scholastica	5	–	3	7	–	3
MacMurray	5	–	3	5	–	5
Northwestern (MN)	4	–	4	4	–	6
Westminster (MO)	4	–	4	4	–	6
Crown	2	–	6	3	–	7
Minnesota–Morris	1	–	7	1	–	9
Iowa Wesleyan	0	–	8	0	–	10
$ – Conference champion; ^ – NCAA Division III playoff participant

2020 Upper Midwest Athletic Conference football standings
	Conf.			Overall
Team	W		L	W		L
Martin Luther	1	–	0	3	–	1
Northwestern (MN)	1	–	0	1	–	1
Westminster (MO)	2	–	1	2	–	1
Greenville	1	–	1	1	–	3
Iowa Wesleyan	1	–	2	1	–	2
Minnesota–Morris	0	–	2	0	–	2
Note: Crown and St. Scholastica did not compete due to COVID-19.

2021 Upper Midwest Athletic Conference football standings
	Conf.			Overall
Team	W		L	W		L
Greenville $^	6	–	0	8	–	3
Martin Luther	5	–	1	5	–	4
Minnesota–Morris	4	–	2	5	–	5
Northwestern (MN)	2	–	3	2	–	7
Westminster (MO)	2	–	4	3	–	5
Crown	1	–	4	1	–	8
Finlandia	0	–	6	0	–	9
$ – Conference champion; ^ – NCAA Division III playoff participant

2022 Upper Midwest Athletic Conference football standings
	Conf.			Overall
Team	W		L	W		L
Northwestern (MN) $^	6	–	0	6	–	5
Greenville	5	–	1	7	–	3
Minnesota–Morris	4	–	2	5	–	5
Crown	3	–	3	3	–	7
Martin Luther	2	–	4	2	–	8
Westminster (MO)	1	–	5	1	–	9
Finlandia	0	–	6	0	–	10
$ – Conference champion; ^ – NCAA Division III playoff participant

2023 Upper Midwest Athletic Conference football standings
	Conf.			Overall
Team	W		L	W		L
Minnesota Morris $^	5	–	0	7	–	4
Northwestern (MN)	4	–	1	6	–	4
Greenville	2	–	3	5	–	5
Martin Luther	2	–	3	2	–	8
Crown	1	–	4	1	–	8
Westminster (MO)	1	–	4	1	–	8
$ – Conference champion; ^ – NCAA Division III playoff participant; Rankings from D3Football.com

2024 Upper Midwest Athletic Conference football standings
	Conf.			Overall
Team	W		L	W		L
Northwestern (MN) $^	7	–	0	7	–	4
Greenville	5	–	2	7	–	3
Martin Luther	4	–	3	6	–	4
Minnesota Morris	4	–	3	5	–	5
Crown	1	–	6	1	–	9
Westminster (MO)	0	–	7	1	–	9
$ – Conference champion; ^ – NCAA Division III playoff participant

2025 Upper Midwest Athletic Conference football standings
	Conf.			Overall
Team	W		L	W		L
Crown $^	6	–	1	7	–	4
Northwestern (MN)	4	–	3	4	–	6
Martin Luther	3	–	4	5	–	5
Greenville	3	–	4	4	–	5
Minnesota Morris	3	–	4	3	–	7
Westminster (MO)	2	–	5	4	–	6
$ – Conference champion; ^ – NCAA Division III playoff participant

== Ice hockey affiliations ==
The UMAC does not sponsor ice hockey. UW-Superior is the one UMAC member school sponsor men's and women's ice hockey as a varsity sport and is a member of the Wisconsin Intercollegiate Athletic Conference. Former schools such as the College of St. Scholastica also sponsored Ice Hockey but played in the Minnesota Intercollegiate Athletic Conference.
