= Donnell =

Donnell is both a surname and a given name. Notable people with the name include:

== Surname ==
- Alison Donnell (fl. 1990s–2020s), UK academic
- Ben Donnell (American football) (1936–2012), American football player
- Bobby Donnell, fictional head of a law firm on the former ABC TV drama, The Practice (1997–2004)
- David Donnell (1939–2020), Canadian poet and writer
- Deborah Donnell, New Zealand and American statistician
- Forrest C. Donnell (1884–1980), United States Senator and the 40th Governor of Missouri
- Harry E. Donnell (1867–1959), American Beaux-Arts architect
- Hugh O Donnell, 2nd Earl of Tyrconnell or Hugh O'Donnell, 2nd Earl of Tyrconnell (1606–1642), titular King of Tír Conaill
- Hugh Roe Ó Donnell or Hugh Roe O'Donnell (1572–1602), An Ó Domhnaill (The O'Donnell) and Rí (king) of Dun na nGall
- James C. Donnell (1854–1927), American industrialist
- Jeff Donnell (1921–1988), American film and television actress
- John Donnell Smith (1829–1928), biologist and taxonomist from Baltimore, Maryland
- John Randolph Donnell (1912–2004), oilman, banker and philanthropist
- John R. Donnell Jr. (fl. 1980s–1990s), American scouting figure
- Radka Donnell (1928–2013), Bulgarian feminist
- Richard Spaight Donnell (1820–1867), Congressional Representative from North Carolina
- Ricky Donnell Ross or Ricky Ross (drug trafficker) (born 1960), American convicted drug trafficker
- Rory Ó Donnell, 1st Earl of Tyrconnell or Rory O'Donnell, 1st Earl of Tyrconnell (1575–1608), the last King of Tír Chonaill

== Given name ==
- Donnell Bennett (born 1972), former American football fullback
- Donnell Cameron, record producer
- Donnell L. Cunningham (1866–1947), chief justice of the Arizona Supreme Court
- Donnell Deeny, KC (born 1950), Chancery Judge in the High Court of Northern Ireland
- Donnell Gilliam (1889–1960), United States federal judge
- Donnell Harvey (born 1980), American professional basketball player
- Donnell Holmes (born 1973), professional heavyweight boxer
- Donnell II O'Donovan or Donal II O'Donovan, Lord of Clancahill (died 1639), son of Donal of the Skins, The O'Donovan of Clann Cathail
- Donnell III O'Donovan or Donal III O'Donovan, The O'Donovan of Clancahill, born before 1584, son of Donal II O'Donovan, The O'Donovan of Clancahill
- Donnell Irrais (fl. 1272–1274), Gaelic-Irish lord, member of the Clan Muircheartaigh Uí Conchobhair
- Donnell Jones or Donell Jones (born 1973), American R&B singer, songwriter and record producer
- Donnell Mor Mideach Ua Conchobair (fl. 1144–1176), Prince of Connacht
- Donnell Ó Con Ceanainn, (died 1316), King of Uí Díarmata
- Donnell of the Hides or Domhnall na g-Croiceann or Hides, The O'Donovan Mor, Lord of Clancahill from c. 1560 to 1584
- Donnell Rawlings (born 1970), American comedian and actor
- Donnell Smith (born 1949), former defensive end in the National Football League
- Donnell Thompson (born 1958), defensive end in the National Football League
- Donnell Washington (born 1981), American football defensive tackle
- Donnell Woolford (born 1966), former professional American football cornerback

== See also ==
- Donnell, Missouri, a community in the United States
- Donnell Library Center, branch of the New York City Library
- Guzmania donnellsmithii, species of the genus Guzmania
- Harry E. Donnell House, historic 33-room Tudor mansion on the north shore of Long Island, New York
- Pisonia donnellsmithii, species of plant in the family Nyctaginaceae
- USS Donnell (DE-56), Buckley-class destroyer escort of the United States Navy
- Donell, given name
- Dunnell (disambiguation)
- MacDonnell, a surname
- O'Donnell, an Irish noble family
