= Donnall =

Donnall may refer to:

- Donnall, King of Tara and heir of Donnchad Donn
- E. Donnall Thomas (1920–2012). American physician
- Robert Sawle Donnall, Anglo-Cornish murderer and inspiration for the story "Jury" by William Robert Hicks

== See also ==
- Donnell
- McDonnall (disambiguation)
- Donnally (disambiguation)
- Donnelly (disambiguation)
- Donal (disambiguation)
