= Donnally =

Donnally may refer to:

People

- Edward W. Donnally, American Naval officer and namesake of Donnally Glacier

Places

- Donnally Glacier, an Antarctic glacier
- Fort Donnally, West Virginia
- Donnally Mills in Perry County, Pennsylvania

Fiction

- Harlan Donnally, protagonist of a series of novels by Steven Gore
- Matt Donnally, character on Necessary Roughness (TV series)

Other

- Edward Donnally Award, athletic honor given at University of Vermont

== See also ==
- Donnell
- McDonnall (disambiguation)
- Donnally (disambiguation)
- Donnelly (disambiguation)
- Donal (disambiguation)
