= Swan Lake Township =

Swan Lake Township may refer to the following townships in the United States:

- Swan Lake Township, Emmet County, Iowa
- Swan Lake Township, Pocahontas County, Iowa
- Swan Lake Township, Stevens County, Minnesota
