= David J. Meltzer =

American archaeologist (born 1955)

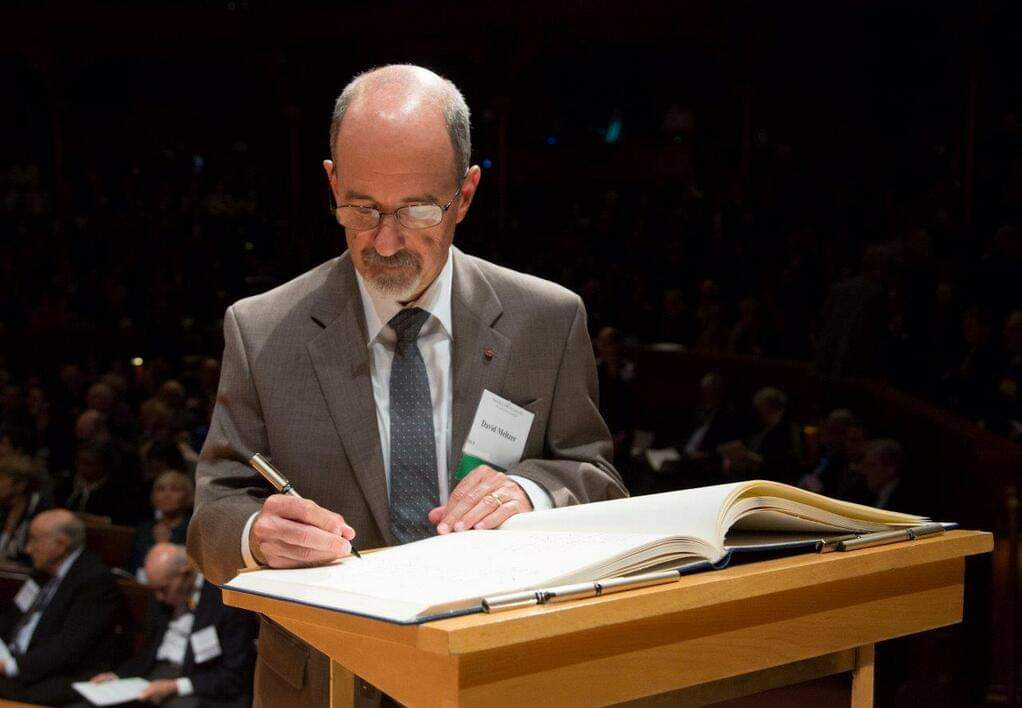
- Born: 1955 (age 70–71)
- Education: University of Maryland; University of Washington
- Known for: Influential studies of Paleo-Indians and extinction of Pleistocene mammalian extinction
- Scientific career
- Fields: Archaeology, Anthropology
- Workplaces: Southern Methodist University
- Thesis: Late Pleistocene Human Adaptations in Eastern North America (1984)
- Doctoral advisor: Robert Dunnell

David Jeffrey Meltzer (born 1955) is an American archaeologist known for his influential studies of Paleo-Indians and Pleistocene mammalian extinction in the Americas. He is currently Henderson-Morrison Professor of Prehistory at Southern Methodist University and Affiliate Professor at the Centre for GeoGenetics at the University of Copenhagen.

Meltzer's scholarship on ancient human populations and fieldwork in the High Plains and Rocky Mountains have earned him widespread acclaim and "forced a revision of the received wisdom that Pleistocene people were exclusively big-game hunters or were responsible for Pleistocene mammalian extinction." He is a Fellow of the American Association for the Advancement of Science and American Academy of Arts and Sciences, as well as a member of the National Academy of Sciences, the Academy of Medicine, Engineering and Science of Texas, and the American Philosophical Society. In 2025, he received the Society for American Archaeology's Fryxell Award for Interdisciplinary Research.

== Early life and education ==
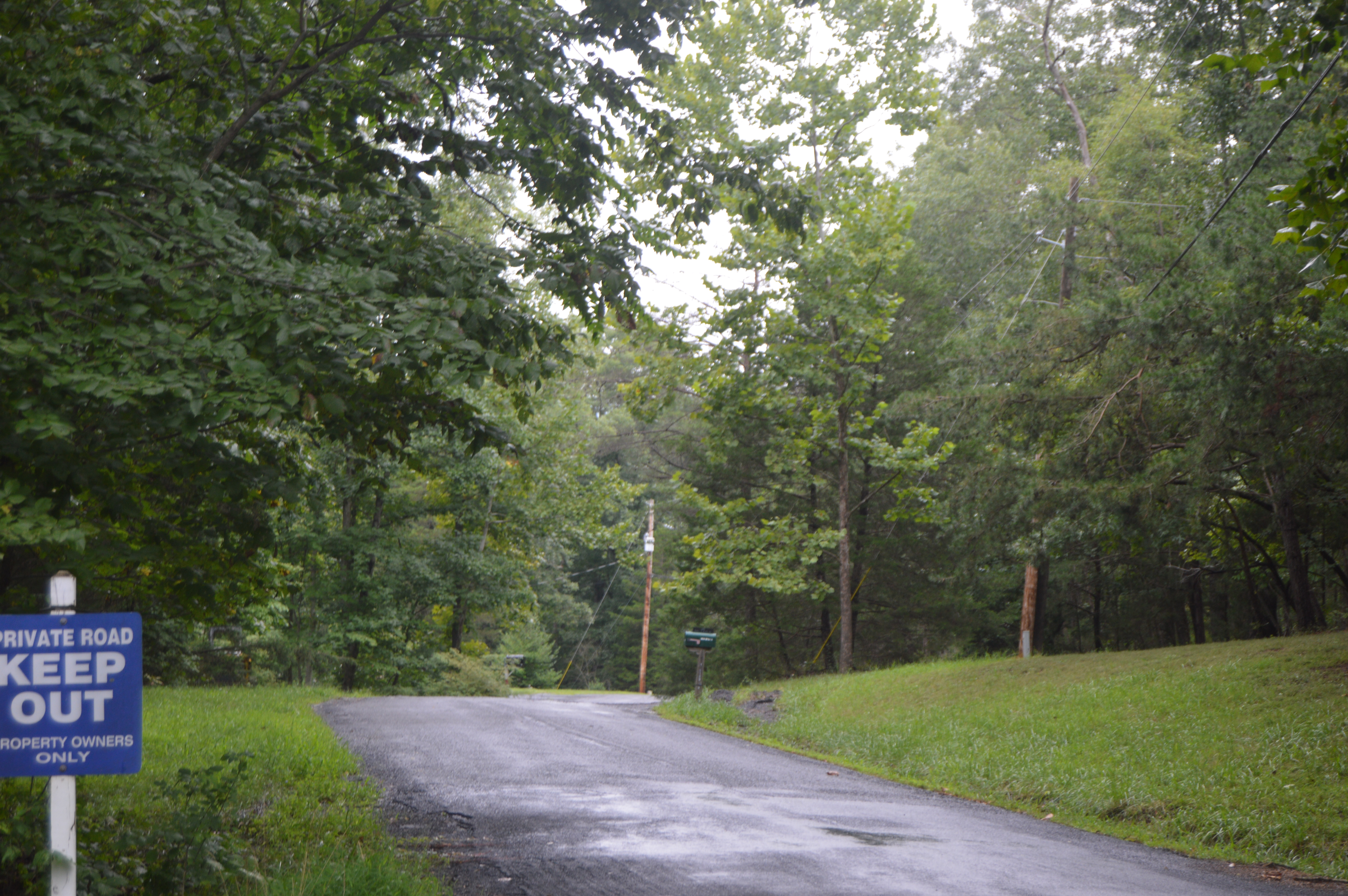
Thunderbird Archaeological District in Front Royal, Virginia

Meltzer first encountered archaeology at the age of 15, when he participated in the excavation of the Thunderbird Site, an important Paleo-Indian Clovis site near Front Royal, Virginia. Meltzer would later enroll at the University of Maryland, where he would graduate in 1977 with a BA in anthropology.

Meltzer then moved to University of Washington to complete an MA in Anthropology/Archaeology, which he received in 1979. Following a stint as a 1981-1982 Predoctoral Fellow in the Department of Anthropology at the Smithsonian Institution, he returned to the University of Washington. Working under the supervision of archaeologist Robert Dunnell, Meltzer received his PhD in 1984. In addition to Dunnell, his dissertation committee included Jean-Paul Dumont, Donald K. Grayson, George I. Quimby, Matsuo Tsukada, and Robert Wenke.

== Career ==
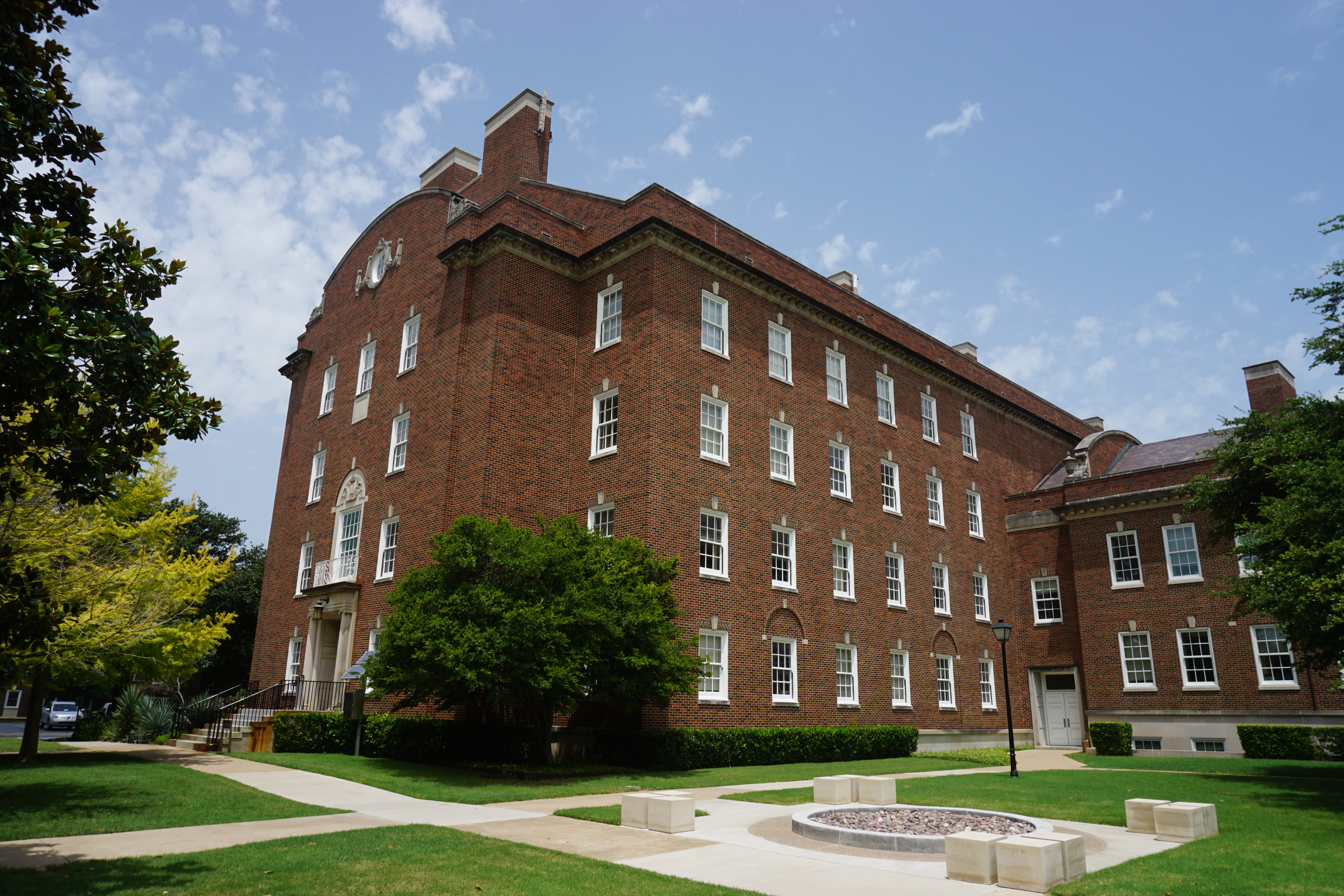
Heroy Hall, home of the Department of Anthropology at Southern Methodist University

In 1984, Meltzer accepted a position in the Department of Anthropology at Southern Methodist University. A year after joining the faculty, Meltzer launched the Texas Clovis Fluted Point Survey. The survey has been updated periodically and remains an ongoing contribution to the regional Paleoindian record. In 1996, he was made inaugural executive director of the Quest Archaeological Program at SMU, an initiative endowed by Joseph and Maude Cramer to advance research on the first peoples of the Americas. Under Meltzer's leadership, Quest has helped fund studies across the Great Plains and Rocky Mountains.

At SMU, he has worked alongside leading archaeologists and cultural anthropologists, including Fred Wendorf, Lewis Binford, David Freidel, Caroline Brettell, and Carolyn Sargent.

In Spring 2019, Meltzer was a Beaufort Visiting Scholar at St. John's College, University of Cambridge.

== Research and scholarship ==
=== Revisiting Folsom ===
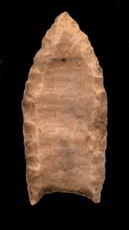
A Folsom Point

Between 1997 and 2000, Meltzer used new archaeological techniques to re-excavate and analyze the famous Paleo-Indian site at Folsom. He and his team studied excavated bison teeth from the site's bison-kill to determine that the hunt had happened in the fall. They further confirmed that Folsom witnessed at least 32 such kills.

One of the project's other objectives was to find the location of the hunt's associated campsite. In this, Meltzer and his team were unsuccessful. By sourcing the stone for "Folsom points" to Texas and Colorado, however, they were able to show that the Folsom site was part of a much larger area across which people of the Folsom tradition moved. Meltzer would document his findings in a 2006 book, Folsom: New Archaeological Investigations of a Classic Paleoindian Bison Kill.

=== Pleistocene overkill and megafaunal extinction ===
Meltzer's research has made him one of the world's leading authorities on the colonization of the Americas and the mammalian extinctions of the Late Pleistocene. Against the so-called "overkill" thesis—the argument that Paleo-Indian hunters were primarily responsible for the disappearance of North American megafauna—Meltzer has argued that climatic and environmental changes at the end of the Pleistocene were the primary drivers of extinction. This work, developed over several decades in collaboration with archaeologist Donald Grayson, has substantially shaped the terms of the debate within the field.

=== Younger Dryas Impact Hypothesis ===
In 2007, a group of researchers proposed the Younger Dryas impact hypothesis, arguing that a comet or asteroid impact approximately 12,900 years ago had triggered the Younger Dryas cooling event and caused the collapse of the Clovis culture. Meltzer was among the most prominent critics of this hypothesis. In a 2010 paper co-authored with Vance Holliday, he marshaled archaeological and geological evidence to show that the chronological and physical evidence invoked in support of the impact hypothesis was not consistent across sites. Archaeology magazine named this paper its "Undiscovery of the Year" for 2010. Meltzer and colleagues subsequently published additional refutations of the hypothesis in the Proceedings of the National Academy of Sciences and the Journal of Quaternary Science.

=== Kennewick Man ===
Meltzer contributed to the scientific resolution of the long-running controversy surrounding Kennewick Man, the skeletal remains of an ancient individual discovered on the banks of the Columbia River in Washington State in 1996. After protracted legal disputes over whether the remains could be studied scientifically, Meltzer co-authored, with Morten Rasmussen and a large international team, a landmark 2015 study in Nature that used ancient DNA analysis to determine the genetic ancestry of Kennewick Man, establishing that he was ancestrally related to present-day Native Americans. He also published a reflective essay, "Kennewick Man: coming to closure," in Antiquity that same year.

=== Ancient genomics and the people of the Americas ===
In recent decades, archaeology has been transformed by breakthroughs in ancient DNA sequencing. Meltzer has become a close collaborator of evolutionary biologist Eske Willerslev, whose reconstruction of the first complete ancient human genome in 2010 opened new avenues for studying prehistoric population movements. Meltzer has been a co-author on a series of high-profile ancient genomics papers in Nature and Science, including studies of early human dispersals within the Americas, the population history of northeastern Siberia, and the terminal Pleistocene Alaskan genome that revealed the first founding population of Native Americans.

In 2021, Meltzer and Willerslev jointly authored a synthesis paper in Nature—"Peopling of the Americas as inferred from ancient genomics"—drawing on the most current ancient DNA evidence to reconstruct the timing, routes, and demographic history of the colonization of the Americas.

== Selected works ==
- Folsom: New archaeological investigations of a classic Paleoindian bison kill (2006)
- The Great Paleolithic War: How Science Forged an Understanding of America's Ice Age Past (2015)
- The Mountaineer site: a Folsom winter camp in the Rockies (2021, with B.N. Andrews and M. Stiger)
- First peoples in a new world: Populating Ice Age America (2021)
