= Donnelly Township, Minnesota =

Donnelly Township is the name of some places in the U.S. state of Minnesota:

- Donnelly Township, Marshall County, Minnesota
- Donnelly Township, Stevens County, Minnesota
