= Horton Township, Stevens County, Minnesota =

Horton Township, Minnesota
- Township
- Location within the state of Minnesota Horton Township, Minnesota (the United States)
- Coordinates: 45°27′32″N 95°55′51″W
- Country: United States
- State: Minnesota
- County: Stevens

Area
  - Total: 35.9 sq mi (93.0 km^{2})
  - Land: 35.8 sq mi (92.8 km^{2})
  - Water: 0.077 sq mi (0.2 km^{2})
- Elevation: 1,112 ft (339 m)

Population (2000)
  - Total: 210
  - Density: 6.0/sq mi (2.3/km^{2})
- Time zone: UTC-6 (Central (CST))
  - Summer (DST): UTC-5 (CDT)
- FIPS code: 27-30212
- GNIS feature ID: 0664520

Horton Township is a township in Stevens County, Minnesota, United States. The population was 189 at the 2020 census.

Horton Township was named for William T. Horton, an early settler.

== Geography ==
According to the United States Census Bureau, the township has a total area of 35.9 square miles (93 km^{2}), of which 35.8 square miles (93 km^{2}) is land and 0.1 square miles (0.26 km^{2}) (0.22%) is water.

== Demographics ==
As of the census of 2000, there were 210 people, 63 households, and 51 families residing in the township. The population density was 5.9 inhabitants per square mile (2.3/km^{2}). There were 68 housing units at an average density of 1.9 per square mile (0.73/km^{2}). The racial makeup of the township was 98.10% White, 0.95% African American, and 0.95% from two or more races. Hispanic or Latino of any race were 0.95% of the population.

There were 63 households, out of which 50.8% had children under the age of 18 living with them, 81.0% were married couples living together, 1.6% had a female householder with no husband present, and 17.5% were non-families. 17.5% of all households were made up of individuals, and 6.3% had someone living alone who was 65 years of age or older. The average household size was 3.33 and the average family size was 3.83.

In the township the population was spread out, with 37.6% under the age of 18, 9.0% from 18 to 24, 28.1% from 25 to 44, 18.1% from 45 to 64, and 7.1% who were 65 years of age or older. The median age was 29 years. For every 100 females, there were 96.3 males. For every 100 females age 18 and over, there were 101.5 males.

The median income for a household in the township was $43,750, and the median income for a family was $45,313. Males had a median income of $27,500 versus $20,938 for females. The per capita income for the township was $13,299. About 3.1% of families and 4.8% of the population were below the poverty line, including 6.5% of those under the age of eighteen and none of those 65 or over.
