= Darnen Township, Stevens County, Minnesota =

Darnen Township, Minnesota
- Township
- Location within the state of Minnesota Darnen Township, Minnesota (the United States)
- Coordinates: 45°33′26″N 95°55′22″W
- Country: United States
- State: Minnesota
- County: Stevens

Area
  - Total: 33.2 sq mi (85.9 km^{2})
  - Land: 32.9 sq mi (85.1 km^{2})
  - Water: 0.35 sq mi (0.9 km^{2})
- Elevation: 1,109 ft (338 m)

Population (2000)
  - Total: 325
  - Density: 9.8/sq mi (3.8/km^{2})
- Time zone: UTC-6 (Central (CST))
  - Summer (DST): UTC-5 (CDT)
- FIPS code: 27-14824
- GNIS feature ID: 0663927

Darnen Township is a township in Stevens County, Minnesota, United States. The population was 350 at the 2020 census.

== History ==
The first permanent settlement at Darnen Township was made in 1866.

== Geography ==
According to the United States Census Bureau, the township has a total area of 33.2 square miles (86 km^{2}), of which 32.8 square miles (85 km^{2}) is land and 0.3 square miles (0.78 km^{2}) (0.99%) is water.

== Demographics ==
As of the census of 2000, there were 325 people, 105 households, and 91 families residing in the township. The population density was 9.9 inhabitants per square mile (3.8/km^{2}). There were 106 housing units at an average density of 3.2 per square mile (1.2/km^{2}). The racial makeup of the township was 100.00% White.

There were 105 households, out of which 38.1% had children under the age of 18 living with them, 81.9% were married couples living together, 1.0% had a female householder with no husband present, and 13.3% were non-families. 9.5% of all households were made up of individuals, and 3.8% had someone living alone who was 65 years of age or older. The average household size was 3.10 and the average family size was 3.32.

In the township the population was spread out, with 26.2% under the age of 18, 9.2% from 18 to 24, 25.8% from 25 to 44, 24.9% from 45 to 64, and 13.8% who were 65 years of age or older. The median age was 38 years. For every 100 females, there were 108.3 males. For every 100 females age 18 and over, there were 106.9 males.

The median income for a household in the township was $51,875, and the median income for a family was $56,250. Males had a median income of $29,063 versus $24,464 for females. The per capita income for the township was $22,645. About 2.2% of families and 3.3% of the population were below the poverty line, including none of those under the age of eighteen or sixty-five or over.
