= Alberta, Minnesota =

City in Minnesota, United States

- City
- Location of Alberta, Minnesota
- Coordinates: 45°34′30″N 96°03′02″W
- Country: United States
- State: Minnesota
- County: Stevens
- Incorporated: May 6, 1912

Government
  - Mayor: Roger D. Gausman

Area
  - Total: 0.263 sq mi (0.680 km^{2})
  - Land: 0.263 sq mi (0.680 km^{2})
  - Water: 0 sq mi (0.000 km^{2})
- Elevation: 1,109 ft (338 m)

Population (2020)
  - Total: 94
  - Estimate (2022): 93
  - Density: 357.9/sq mi (138.18/km^{2})
- Time zone: UTC−6 (Central (CST))
  - Summer (DST): UTC−5 (CDT)
- ZIP Code: 56207
- Area code: 320
- FIPS code: 27-00676
- GNIS feature ID: 2393903
- Sales tax: 6.875%

Alberta is a city in Stevens County, Minnesota, United States. The population was 94 at the 2020 census.

== History ==
A post office called Alberta has been in operation since 1896. The city was named for Alberta Lindsey, the wife of an early settler. The city contains one property listed on the National Register of Historic Places, the 1917 Alberta Teachers House.

== Geography ==
According to the United States Census Bureau, the city has a total area of 0.263 square miles (0.68 km^{2}), all land.

Minnesota State Highway 28 serves as a main route in the community.

== Demographics ==
Historical population
Census	Pop.	Note	%±
1920	109		—
1930	153		40.4%
1940	200		30.7%
1950	139		−30.5%
1960	149		7.2%
1970	140		−6.0%
1980	145		3.6%
1990	136		−6.2%
2000	142		4.4%
2010	103		−27.5%
2020	94		−8.7%
2022 (est.)	93		−1.1%
U.S. Decennial Census; 2020 Census

=== 2010 census ===
As of the 2010 census, there were 103 people, 41 households, and 32 families residing in the city. The population density was 381.5 inhabitants per square mile (147.3/km^{2}). There were 51 housing units at an average density of 188.9 per square mile (72.9/km^{2}). The racial makeup of the city was 100.0% White.

There were 41 households, of which 22.0% had children under the age of 18 living with them, 63.4% were married couples living together, 7.3% had a female householder with no husband present, 7.3% had a male householder with no wife present, and 22.0% were non-families. 19.5% of all households were made up of individuals, and 9.8% had someone living alone who was 65 years of age or older. The average household size was 2.51, and the average family size was 2.84.

The median age in the city was 46.5 years. 22.3% of residents were under the age of 18, 3.9% were between the ages of 18 and 24, 23.3% were from 25 to 44, 34.9% were from 45 to 64, and 15.5% were 65 years of age or older. The gender makeup of the city was 53.4% male and 46.6% female.

=== 2000 census ===
As of the 2000 census, there were 142 people, 52 households, and 42 families residing in the city. The population density was 513.2 inhabitants per square mile (198.1/km^{2}). There were 56 housing units at an average density of 202.4 per square mile (78.1/km^{2}). The racial makeup of the city was 100.00% White.

There were 52 households, out of which 40.4% had children under the age of 18 living with them, 65.4% were married couples living together, 7.7% had a female householder with no husband present, and 19.2% were non-families. 19.2% of all households were made up of individuals, and 5.8% had someone living alone who was 65 years of age or older. The average household size was 2.73 and the average family size was 3.10.

In the city, the population was spread out, with 31.7% under the age of 18, 4.9% from 18 to 24, 30.3% from 25 to 44, 21.1% from 45 to 64, and 12.0% who were 65 years of age or older. The median age was 34 years. For every 100 females, there were 100.0 males. For every 100 females age 18 and over, there were 98.0 males.

The median income for a household in the city was $43,500, and the median income for a family was $44,000. Males had a median income of $29,250 versus $20,250 for females. The per capita income for the city was $15,296. None of the population and none of the families were below the poverty line.
