= Scott Township, Stevens County, Minnesota =

Scott Township, Minnesota
- Township
- Location within the state of Minnesota Scott Township, Minnesota (the United States)
- Coordinates: 45°32′58″N 96°3′57″W
- Country: United States
- State: Minnesota
- County: Stevens

Area
  - Total: 35.3 sq mi (91.5 km^{2})
  - Land: 33.1 sq mi (85.8 km^{2})
  - Water: 2.2 sq mi (5.7 km^{2})
- Elevation: 1,129 ft (344 m)

Population (2000)
  - Total: 150
  - Density: 4.4/sq mi (1.7/km^{2})
- Time zone: UTC-6 (Central (CST))
  - Summer (DST): UTC-5 (CDT)
- FIPS code: 27-59044
- GNIS feature ID: 0665570

Scott Township is a township in Stevens County, Minnesota, United States. The population was 117 at the 2020 census.

A large share of the first settlers came from Scott County, which may have caused the name to be selected.

== Geography ==
According to the United States Census Bureau, the township has a total area of 35.3 square miles (91.5 km^{2}), of which 33.1 square miles (85.8 km^{2}) is land and 2.2 square miles (5.7 km^{2}) (6.23%) is water.

== Demographics ==
As of the census of 2000, there were 150 people, 53 households, and 46 families residing in the township. The population density was 4.5 people per square mile (1.7/km^{2}). There were 65 housing units at an average density of 2.0/sq mi (0.8/km^{2}). The racial makeup of the township was 100.00% White.

There were 53 households, out of which 35.8% had children under the age of 18 living with them, 84.9% were married couples living together, 1.9% had a female householder with no husband present, and 13.2% were non-families. 13.2% of all households were made up of individuals, and 3.8% had someone living alone who was 65 years of age or older. The average household size was 2.83 and the average family size was 3.11.

In the township the population was spread out, with 29.3% under the age of 18, 2.7% from 18 to 24, 24.7% from 25 to 44, 23.3% from 45 to 64, and 20.0% who were 65 years of age or older. The median age was 41 years. For every 100 females, there were 94.8 males. For every 100 females age 18 and over, there were 100 males.

The median income for a household in the township was $51,250, and the median income for a family was $58,393. Males had a median income of $37,813 versus $22,083 for females. The per capita income for the township was $28,924. There were 6.4% of families and 10.7% of the population living below the poverty line, including 18.6% of under eighteens and 9.1% of those over 64.
