= 1940 United States presidential election in Minnesota =

- November 5, 1940

Nominee	Franklin D. Roosevelt	Wendell Willkie
Party	Democratic	Republican
Alliance	Farmer–Labor
Home state	New York	New York
Running mate	Henry A. Wallace	Charles L. McNary
Electoral vote	11	0
Popular vote	644,196	596,274
Percentage	51.49%	47.66%
County results
Roosevelt
40–50%
50–60%
60–70%
70–80%
Willkie
50–60%
60–70%
70–80%
President before election
Franklin D. Roosevelt
Democratic
Elected President
Franklin D. Roosevelt
Democratic

The 1940 United States presidential election in Minnesota took place on November 5, 1940, as part of the 1940 United States presidential election. Voters chose 11 electors, or representatives to the Electoral College, who voted for president and vice president.

Minnesota was won by the Democratic candidate, incumbent President Franklin D. Roosevelt won the state over dark horse Republican nominee Wendell Willkie of New York by a margin of 47,922 votes, or 3.83%. Nationally, Roosevelt was re-elected to an unprecedented third term as president, with 449 electoral votes and a 9.97% lead over Willkie in the popular vote.

== Results ==
1940 United States presidential election in Minnesota
Party	Candidate	Votes	Percentage	Electoral votes
Democratic	Franklin D. Roosevelt (incumbent)	644,196	51.49%	11
Republican	Wendell Willkie	596,274	47.66%	0
Socialist	Norman Thomas	5,454	0.44%	0
Communist	Earl Browder	2,711	0.22%	0
Socialist Labor	John W. Aiken	2,553	0.20%	0
Totals		1,251,188	100.00%	11

=== Results by county ===
County	Franklin Delano Roosevelt Democratic		Wendell Lewis Willkie Republican		Various candidates Other parties		Margin		Total votes cast
County	#	%	#	%	#	%	#	%	Total votes cast
Aitkin	3,610	48.33%	3,744	50.12%	116	1.55%	-134	-1.79%	7,470
Anoka	5,501	55.66%	4,302	43.53%	80	0.81%	1,199	12.13%	9,883
Becker	6,432	59.47%	4,292	39.68%	92	0.85%	2,140	19.79%	10,816
Beltrami	7,036	65.68%	3,511	32.77%	166	1.55%	3,525	32.90%	10,713
Benton	2,742	43.79%	3,491	55.76%	28	0.45%	-749	-11.96%	6,261
Big Stone	2,517	56.16%	1,925	42.95%	40	0.89%	592	13.21%	4,482
Blue Earth	5,880	37.73%	9,642	61.87%	62	0.40%	-3,762	-24.14%	15,584
Brown	3,678	32.55%	7,533	66.66%	90	0.80%	-3,855	-34.11%	11,301
Carlton	7,159	67.09%	3,400	31.87%	111	1.04%	3,759	35.23%	10,670
Carver	1,753	21.11%	6,528	78.62%	22	0.26%	-4,775	-57.51%	8,303
Cass	4,392	51.47%	4,089	47.92%	52	0.61%	303	3.55%	8,533
Chippewa	3,969	54.07%	3,307	45.05%	64	0.87%	662	9.02%	7,340
Chisago	2,746	43.06%	3,569	55.97%	62	0.97%	-823	-12.91%	6,377
Clay	6,295	58.32%	4,450	41.23%	48	0.44%	1,845	17.09%	10,793
Clearwater	3,289	70.31%	1,354	28.94%	35	0.75%	1,935	41.36%	4,678
Cook	686	50.22%	673	49.27%	7	0.51%	13	0.95%	1,366
Cottonwood	2,991	41.23%	4,228	58.28%	36	0.50%	-1,237	-17.05%	7,255
Crow Wing	6,876	54.79%	5,524	44.02%	150	1.20%	1,352	10.77%	12,550
Dakota	9,327	52.57%	8,339	47.00%	77	0.43%	988	5.57%	17,743
Dodge	2,357	41.90%	3,257	57.90%	11	0.20%	-900	-16.00%	5,625
Douglas	4,507	48.95%	4,652	50.53%	48	0.52%	-145	-1.57%	9,207
Faribault	4,099	37.36%	6,816	62.13%	56	0.51%	-2,717	-24.77%	10,971
Fillmore	3,826	32.69%	7,839	66.98%	39	0.33%	-4,013	-34.29%	11,704
Freeborn	6,942	50.75%	6,683	48.85%	55	0.40%	259	1.89%	13,680
Goodhue	6,475	41.36%	9,095	58.09%	86	0.55%	-2,620	-16.73%	15,656
Grant	2,291	48.09%	2,443	51.28%	30	0.63%	-152	-3.19%	4,764
Hennepin	145,168	53.69%	122,960	45.48%	2,230	0.82%	22,208	8.21%	270,358
Houston	2,082	29.98%	4,825	69.48%	37	0.53%	-2,743	-39.50%	6,944
Hubbard	2,141	45.45%	2,544	54.00%	26	0.55%	-403	-8.55%	4,711
Isanti	2,654	49.51%	2,617	48.82%	90	1.68%	37	0.69%	5,361
Itasca	9,899	64.89%	5,196	34.06%	159	1.04%	4,703	30.83%	15,254
Jackson	4,065	54.33%	3,387	45.27%	30	0.40%	678	9.06%	7,482
Kanabec	2,185	48.07%	2,311	50.85%	49	1.08%	-126	-2.77%	4,545
Kandiyohi	7,187	62.28%	4,263	36.94%	90	0.78%	2,924	25.34%	11,540
Kittson	3,167	70.69%	1,279	28.55%	34	0.76%	1,888	42.14%	4,480
Koochiching	5,219	70.98%	2,095	28.49%	39	0.53%	3,124	42.49%	7,353
Lac qui Parle	3,106	44.86%	3,789	54.73%	28	0.40%	-683	-9.87%	6,923
Lake	2,750	73.67%	933	24.99%	50	1.34%	1,817	48.67%	3,733
Lake of the Woods	1,638	64.79%	850	33.62%	40	1.58%	788	31.17%	2,528
Le Sueur	3,750	40.27%	5,543	59.52%	20	0.21%	-1,793	-19.25%	9,313
Lincoln	2,536	52.95%	2,220	46.36%	33	0.69%	316	6.60%	4,789
Lyon	5,234	54.66%	4,305	44.96%	36	0.38%	929	9.70%	9,575
McLeod	2,884	30.62%	6,474	68.73%	62	0.66%	-3,590	-38.11%	9,420
Mahnomen	1,959	64.40%	1,069	35.14%	14	0.46%	890	29.26%	3,042
Marshall	4,549	64.67%	2,441	34.70%	44	0.63%	2,108	29.97%	7,034
Martin	4,290	40.02%	6,409	59.79%	21	0.20%	-2,119	-19.77%	10,720
Meeker	3,615	41.62%	5,026	57.86%	45	0.52%	-1,411	-16.24%	8,686
Mille Lacs	3,619	50.61%	3,459	48.37%	73	1.02%	160	2.24%	7,151
Morrison	5,144	47.04%	5,734	52.43%	58	0.53%	-590	-5.40%	10,936
Mower	7,988	52.49%	7,169	47.11%	60	0.39%	819	5.38%	15,217
Murray	3,203	51.00%	3,044	48.46%	34	0.54%	159	2.53%	6,281
Nicollet	2,832	37.57%	4,674	62.01%	31	0.41%	-1,842	-24.44%	7,537
Nobles	3,919	43.26%	5,104	56.34%	36	0.40%	-1,185	-13.08%	9,059
Norman	3,716	62.81%	2,161	36.53%	39	0.66%	1,555	26.28%	5,916
Olmsted	8,393	47.82%	9,096	51.83%	62	0.35%	-703	-4.01%	17,551
Otter Tail	7,705	35.62%	13,737	63.51%	187	0.86%	-6,032	-27.89%	21,629
Pennington	3,886	66.53%	1,857	31.79%	98	1.68%	2,029	34.74%	5,841
Pine	5,263	55.25%	4,106	43.10%	157	1.65%	1,157	12.15%	9,526
Pipestone	2,390	40.91%	3,423	58.59%	29	0.50%	-1,033	-17.68%	5,842
Polk	10,652	66.64%	5,200	32.53%	133	0.83%	5,452	34.11%	15,985
Pope	3,266	53.63%	2,805	46.06%	19	0.31%	461	7.57%	6,090
Ramsey	78,990	57.17%	57,093	41.32%	2,082	1.51%	21,897	15.85%	138,165
Red Lake	2,023	69.40%	876	30.05%	16	0.55%	1,147	39.35%	2,915
Redwood	3,637	37.18%	6,105	62.41%	40	0.41%	-2,468	-25.23%	9,782
Renville	4,588	42.32%	6,196	57.15%	58	0.53%	-1,608	-14.83%	10,842
Rice	4,687	36.40%	8,143	63.25%	45	0.35%	-3,456	-26.84%	12,875
Rock	1,983	40.05%	2,944	59.46%	24	0.48%	-961	-19.41%	4,951
Roseau	4,289	70.05%	1,730	28.25%	104	1.70%	2,559	41.79%	6,123
Saint Louis	68,620	66.87%	32,243	31.42%	1,760	1.72%	36,377	35.45%	102,623
Scott	2,910	40.57%	4,241	59.13%	21	0.29%	-1,331	-18.56%	7,172
Sherburne	1,570	38.86%	2,450	60.64%	20	0.50%	-880	-21.78%	4,040
Sibley	1,986	26.17%	5,564	73.32%	39	0.51%	-3,578	-47.15%	7,589
Stearns	9,305	36.58%	16,027	63.01%	102	0.40%	-6,722	-26.43%	25,434
Steele	3,668	39.87%	5,517	59.97%	14	0.15%	-1,849	-20.10%	9,199
Stevens	2,018	43.38%	2,619	56.30%	15	0.32%	-601	-12.92%	4,652
Swift	3,899	57.61%	2,815	41.59%	54	0.80%	1,084	16.02%	6,768
Todd	4,553	41.71%	6,302	57.73%	61	0.56%	-1,749	-16.02%	10,916
Traverse	2,094	59.14%	1,434	40.50%	13	0.37%	660	18.64%	3,541
Wabasha	2,655	31.90%	5,656	67.95%	13	0.16%	-3,001	-36.05%	8,324
Wadena	2,405	45.04%	2,898	54.27%	37	0.69%	-493	-9.23%	5,340
Waseca	2,673	37.06%	4,515	62.60%	25	0.35%	-1,842	-25.54%	7,213
Washington	6,288	48.18%	6,710	51.41%	54	0.41%	-422	-3.23%	13,052
Watonwan	2,783	44.25%	3,478	55.30%	28	0.45%	-695	-11.05%	6,289
Wilkin	2,176	51.20%	2,067	48.64%	7	0.16%	109	2.56%	4,250
Winona	7,187	42.55%	9,599	56.83%	105	0.62%	-2,412	-14.28%	16,891
Wright	3,993	32.26%	8,297	67.04%	87	0.70%	-4,304	-34.77%	12,377
Yellow Medicine	3,786	48.61%	3,964	50.89%	39	0.50%	-178	-2.29%	7,789
Totals	644,196	51.49%	596,274	47.66%	10,719	0.86%	47,922	3.83%	1,251,189

==== Counties that flipped from Democratic to Republican ====
- Aitkin
- Benton
- Blue Earth
- Brown
- Chisago
- Cottonwood
- Dodge
- Douglas
- Faribault
- Goodhue
- Grant
- Houston
- Hubbard
- Kanabec
- Lac qui Parle
- Le Sueur
- McLeod
- Martin
- Meeker
- Morrison
- Nicollet
- Nobles
- Olmsted
- Pipestone
- Redwood
- Renville
- Rice
- Rock
- Scott
- Sherburne
- Sibley
- Stearns
- Steele
- Stevens
- Todd
- Wabasha
- Wadena
- Waseca
- Washington
- Watonwan
- Winona
- Wright
- Yellow Medicine

== See also ==
- United States presidential elections in Minnesota
