= Eldorado Township, Stevens County, Minnesota =

Eldorado Township, Minnesota
- Township
- Location within the state of Minnesota Eldorado Township, Minnesota (the United States)
- Coordinates: 45°42′41″N 96°10′55″W
- Country: United States
- State: Minnesota
- County: Stevens

Area
  - Total: 36.1 sq mi (93.5 km^{2})
  - Land: 35.8 sq mi (92.8 km^{2})
  - Water: 0.27 sq mi (0.7 km^{2})
- Elevation: 1,086 ft (331 m)

Population (2000)
  - Total: 109
  - Density: 3.1/sq mi (1.2/km^{2})
- Time zone: UTC-6 (Central (CST))
  - Summer (DST): UTC-5 (CDT)
- FIPS code: 27-18494
- GNIS feature ID: 0664062

Eldorado Township is a township in Stevens County, Minnesota, United States. The population was 85 at the 2020 census.

== Geography ==
According to the United States Census Bureau, the township has a total area of 36.1 square miles (93 km^{2}), of which 35.8 square miles (93 km^{2}) is land and 0.3 square miles (0.78 km^{2}) (0.75%) is water.

== Demographics ==
As of the census of 2000, there were 109 people, 39 households, and 32 families residing in the township. The population density was 3.0 inhabitants per square mile (1.2/km^{2}). There were 41 housing units at an average density of 1.1 per square mile (0.42/km^{2}). The racial makeup of the township was 100.00% White.

There were 39 households, out of which 35.9% had children under the age of 18 living with them, 79.5% were married couples living together, 2.6% had a female householder with no husband present, and 15.4% were non-families. 15.4% of all households were made up of individuals, and 5.1% had someone living alone who was 65 years of age or older. The average household size was 2.79 and the average family size was 3.12.

In the township the population was spread out, with 23.9% under the age of 18, 9.2% from 18 to 24, 30.3% from 25 to 44, 20.2% from 45 to 64, and 16.5% who were 65 years of age or older. The median age was 38 years. For every 100 females, there were 105.7 males. For every 100 females age 18 and over, there were 124.3 males.

The median income for a household in the township was $58,125, and the median income for a family was $59,375. Males had a median income of $35,313 versus $29,583 for females. The per capita income for the township was $15,789. There were 12.8% of families and 13.7% of the population living below the poverty line, including 14.3% of under eighteens and 10.0% of those over 64.
