= Pepperton Township, Stevens County, Minnesota =

Pepperton Township, Minnesota
- Township
- Location within the state of Minnesota Pepperton Township, Minnesota (the United States)
- Coordinates: 45°38′11″N 96°3′25″W
- Country: United States
- State: Minnesota
- County: Stevens

Area
  - Total: 36.1 sq mi (93.5 km^{2})
  - Land: 35.7 sq mi (92.4 km^{2})
  - Water: 0.46 sq mi (1.2 km^{2})
- Elevation: 1,112 ft (339 m)

Population (2000)
  - Total: 148
  - Density: 4.1/sq mi (1.6/km^{2})
- Time zone: UTC-6 (Central (CST))
  - Summer (DST): UTC-5 (CDT)
- FIPS code: 27-50380
- GNIS feature ID: 0665279

Pepperton Township is a township in Stevens County, Minnesota, United States. The population was 109 at the 2020 census.

Pepperton Township was named for Charles A. Pepper, a pioneer settler.

== Geography ==
According to the United States Census Bureau, the township has a total area of 36.1 square miles (93.6 km^{2}), of which 35.7 square miles (92.4 km^{2}) is land and 0.5 square mile (1.2 km^{2}) (1.27%) is water.

== Demographics ==
As of the census of 2000, there were 148 people, 54 households, and 40 families residing in the township. The population density was 4.2 people per square mile (1.6/km^{2}). There were 63 housing units at an average density of 1.8/sq mi (0.7/km^{2}). The racial makeup of the township was 97.97% White, 1.35% Native American, and 0.68% from two or more races.

There were 54 households, out of which 33.3% had children under the age of 18 living with them, 70.4% were married couples living together, and 25.9% were non-families. 22.2% of all households were made up of individuals, and 13.0% had someone living alone who was 65 years of age or older. The average household size was 2.74 and the average family size was 3.15.

In the township the population was spread out, with 33.1% under the age of 18, 2.7% from 18 to 24, 26.4% from 25 to 44, 24.3% from 45 to 64, and 13.5% who were 65 years of age or older. The median age was 38 years. For every 100 females, there were 108.5 males. For every 100 females age 18 and over, there were 106.3 males.

The median income for a household in the township was $46,250, and the median income for a family was $50,833. Males had a median income of $24,500 versus $24,375 for females. The per capita income for the township was $17,518. There were 5.9% of families and 9.5% of the population living below the poverty line, including no under eighteens and 7.7% of those over 64.
