= Moore Township, Stevens County, Minnesota =

Moore Township, Minnesota
- Township
- Location within the state of Minnesota Moore Township, Minnesota (the United States)
- Coordinates: 45°27′47″N 95°49′11″W
- Country: United States
- State: Minnesota
- County: Stevens

Area
  - Total: 35.3 sq mi (91.5 km^{2})
  - Land: 35.3 sq mi (91.5 km^{2})
  - Water: 0 sq mi (0.0 km^{2})
- Elevation: 1,099 ft (335 m)

Population (2000)
  - Total: 252
  - Density: 7.3/sq mi (2.8/km^{2})
- Time zone: UTC-6 (Central (CST))
  - Summer (DST): UTC-5 (CDT)
- FIPS code: 27-43846
- GNIS feature ID: 0665018

Moore Township is a township in Stevens County, Minnesota, United States. The population was 286 at the 2020 census.

Moore Township bears the surname of an early settler.

== Geography ==
According to the United States Census Bureau, the township has a total area of 35.3 square miles (91.5 km^{2}), all land.

== Demographics ==
As of the census of 2000, there were 252 people, 81 households, and 69 families residing in the township. The population density was 7.1 people per square mile (2.8/km^{2}). There were 83 housing units at an average density of 2.4/sq mi (0.9/km^{2}). The racial makeup of the township was 100.00% White.

There were 81 households, out of which 44.4% had children under the age of 18 living with them, 82.7% were married couples living together, 1.2% had a female householder with no husband present, and 13.6% were non-families. 8.6% of all households were made up of individuals, and 3.7% had someone living alone who was 65 years of age or older. The average household size was 3.11 and the average family size was 3.31.

In the township the population was spread out, with 31.7% under the age of 18, 10.7% from 18 to 24, 25.4% from 25 to 44, 23.4% from 45 to 64, and 8.7% who were 65 years of age or older. The median age was 34 years. For every 100 females, there were 123.0 males. For every 100 females age 18 and over, there were 115.0 males.

The median income for a household in the township was $44,583, and the median income for a family was $47,500. Males had a median income of $34,375 versus $21,875 for females. The per capita income for the township was $17,001. About 2.9% of families and 2.4% of the population were below the poverty line, including none of those under the age of eighteen or sixty five or over.
