= Alberta Teachers House =

- U.S. National Register of Historic Places
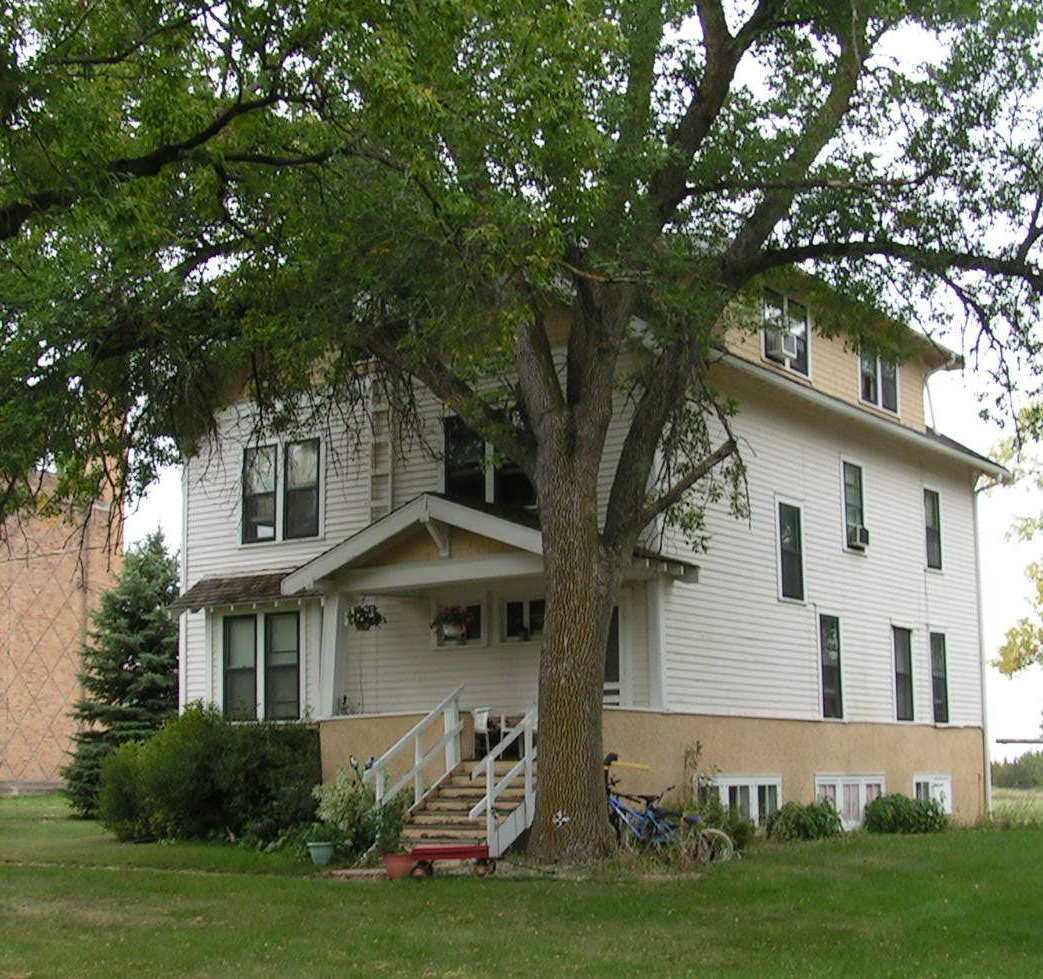
- The Alberta Teachers House from the northeast

- Location within Minnesota Location within the United States
- Location: Main Street, Alberta, Minnesota
- Coordinates: 45°34′33.3″N 96°2′54″W
- Area: Less than one acre
- Built: 1917
- Architectural style: American Craftsman
- NRHP reference No.: 83000942
- Added to NRHP: February 11, 1983

The Alberta Teachers House is a historic house in Alberta, Minnesota, United States. It was built in 1917 to provide urbane, apartment-like housing for faculty of the adjacent school as part of the era's efforts to modernize rural education. The house was listed on the National Register of Historic Places in 1983 for having local significance in the themes of education and social history. It was nominated for its associations with a key period in the development of Minnesota's rural education system. At the time the state's numerous one-room schoolhouses were being consolidated into fewer, larger facilities centered in towns and cities. The Alberta Teachers House was an experiment by the General Education Board, a national philanthropic foundation, intended to engender community building and make rural teaching posts more appealing.

== See also ==
- National Register of Historic Places listings in Stevens County, Minnesota
