= Hodges Township, Stevens County, Minnesota =

Hodges Township, Minnesota
- Township
- Location within the state of Minnesota Hodges Township, Minnesota (the United States)
- Coordinates: 45°31′58″N 95°47′58″W
- Country: United States
- State: Minnesota
- County: Stevens

Area
  - Total: 35.5 sq mi (91.9 km^{2})
  - Land: 34.1 sq mi (88.4 km^{2})
  - Water: 1.3 sq mi (3.4 km^{2})
- Elevation: 1,150 ft (350 m)

Population (2000)
  - Total: 264
  - Density: 7.8/sq mi (3/km^{2})
- Time zone: UTC-6 (Central (CST))
  - Summer (DST): UTC-5 (CDT)
- FIPS code: 27-29438
- GNIS feature ID: 0664489

Hodges Township is a township in Stevens County, Minnesota, United States. The population was 300 at the 2020 census.

Hodges Township was named for Leonard Bacon Hodges, who was credited with planting many trees in the region.

== Geography ==
According to the United States Census Bureau, the township has a total area of 35.5 square miles (92 km^{2}), of which 34.2 square miles (89 km^{2}) is land and 1.3 square miles (3.4 km^{2}) (3.75%) is water.

== Demographics ==
As of the census of 2000, there were 264 people, 86 households, and 73 families residing in the township. The population density was 7.7 inhabitants per square mile (3.0/km^{2}). There were 93 housing units at an average density of 2.7 per square mile (1.0/km^{2}). The racial makeup of the township was 99.24% White, and 0.76% from two or more races.

There were 86 households, out of which 39.5% had children under the age of 18 living with them, 82.6% were married couples living together, 1.2% had a female householder with no husband present, and 14.0% were non-families. 11.6% of all households were made up of individuals, and 3.5% had someone living alone who was 65 years of age or older. The average household size was 3.07 and the average family size was 3.31.

In the township the population was spread out, with 29.5% under the age of 18, 9.8% from 18 to 24, 25.4% from 25 to 44, 23.5% from 45 to 64, and 11.7% who were 65 years of age or older. The median age was 36 years. For every 100 females, there were 107.9 males. For every 100 females age 18 and over, there were 106.7 males.

The median income for a household in the township was $50,833, and the median income for a family was $51,250. Males had a median income of $31,000 versus $21,000 for females. The per capita income for the township was $25,367. About 2.5% of families and 1.9% of the population were below the poverty line, including none of those under the age of eighteen or sixty five or over.
