= Rendsville Township, Stevens County, Minnesota =

Rendsville Township, Minnesota
- Township
- Location within Minnesota Location within the United States
- Coordinates: 45°42′39″N 95°57′15″W
- Country: United States
- State: Minnesota
- County: Stevens

Area
  - Total: 34.9 sq mi (90.5 km^{2})
  - Land: 34.4 sq mi (89.0 km^{2})
  - Water: 0.58 sq mi (1.5 km^{2})
- Elevation: 1,188 ft (362 m)

Population (2000)
  - Total: 177
  - Density: 5.2/sq mi (2/km^{2})
- Time zone: UTC-6 (Central (CST))
  - Summer (DST): UTC-5 (CDT)
- FIPS code: 27-53818
- GNIS feature ID: 0665398

Rendsville Township is a township in Stevens County, Minnesota, United States. The population was 120 at the 2020 census.

== Geography ==
According to the United States Census Bureau, the township has a total area of 35.0 square miles (90.5 km^{2}), of which 34.4 square miles (89.0 km^{2}) is land and 0.6 square mile (1.5 km^{2}) (1.66%) is water.

== Demographics ==
As of the census of 2000, there were 177 people, 67 households, and 55 families residing in the township. The population density was 5.1 people per square mile (2.0/km^{2}). There were 77 housing units at an average density of 2.2/sq mi (0.9/km^{2}). The racial makeup of the township was 99.44% White, and 0.56% from two or more races.

There were 67 households, out of which 25.4% had children under the age of 18 living with them, 70.1% were married couples living together, 3.0% had a female householder with no husband present, and 17.9% were non-families. 16.4% of all households were made up of individuals, and 10.4% had someone living alone who was 65 years of age or older. The average household size was 2.64 and the average family size was 2.93.

In the township, the population was spread out, with 19.8% under the age of 18, 9.6% from 18 to 24, 26.6% from 25 to 44, 27.1% from 45 to 64, and 16.9% who were 65 years of age or older. The median age was 41 years. For every 100 females, there were 124.1 males. For every 100 females age 18 and over, there were 121.9 males.

The median income for a household in the township was $41,250, and the median income for a family was $48,750. Males had a median income of $24,375 versus $11,875 for females. The per capita income for the township was $19,554. About 4.2% of families and 7.7% of the population were below the poverty line, including 28.6% of those under the age of eighteen and 9.5% of those 65 or over.
