= Framnas Township, Stevens County, Minnesota =

Framnas Township, Minnesota
- Township
- Location within the state of Minnesota Framnas Township, Minnesota (the United States)
- Coordinates: 45°37′1″N 95°49′51″W
- Country: United States
- State: Minnesota
- County: Stevens

Area
  - Total: 36.1 sq mi (93.4 km^{2})
  - Land: 33.4 sq mi (86.5 km^{2})
  - Water: 2.7 sq mi (6.9 km^{2})
- Elevation: 1,161 ft (354 m)

Population (2000)
  - Total: 318
  - Density: 9.6/sq mi (3.7/km^{2})
- Time zone: UTC-6 (Central (CST))
  - Summer (DST): UTC-5 (CDT)
- FIPS code: 27-22274
- GNIS feature ID: 0664213

Framnas Township is a township in Stevens County, Minnesota, United States. The population was 346 at the 2020 census.

Framnas Township was originally built up chiefly by Scandinavians. The township's first name was Scandia, after the first post office with the same name. The first postmaster and the creator of the name "Scandia" was the Norwegian Thomas Thomason, who immigrated to the US in 1861 from Arendal Norway. He moved to Stevens County in 1867 as the third settler. As a postmaster, he was the first public official in Stevens County.

== Geography ==
According to the United States Census Bureau, the township has a total area of 36.1 square miles (93 km^{2}), of which 33.4 square miles (87 km^{2}) is land and 2.7 square miles (7.0 km^{2}) (7.43%) is water.

== Demographics ==
As of the census of 2000, there were 318 people, 114 households, and 98 families residing in the township. The population density was 9.5 inhabitants per square mile (3.7/km^{2}). There were 123 housing units at an average density of 3.7 per square mile (1.4/km^{2}). The racial makeup of the township was 98.74% White, 0.63% Asian, and 0.63% from two or more races.

There were 114 households, out of which 36.8% had children under the age of 18 living with them, 83.3% were married couples living together, 1.8% had a female householder with no husband present, and 13.2% were non-families. 10.5% of all households were made up of individuals, and 5.3% had someone living alone who was 65 years of age or older. The average household size was 2.79 and the average family size was 2.94.

In the township the population was spread out, with 27.4% under the age of 18, 4.4% from 18 to 24, 23.0% from 25 to 44, 31.8% from 45 to 64, and 13.5% who were 65 years of age or older. The median age was 42 years. For every 100 females, there were 105.2 males. For every 100 females age 18 and over, there were 99.1 males.

The median income for a household in the township was $45,750, and the median income for a family was $46,500. Males had a median income of $32,500 versus $21,042 for females. The per capita income for the township was $16,943. About 2.2% of families and 6.2% of the population were below the poverty line, including 7.1% of those under age 18 and none of those age 65 or over.
