= Donell =

Donell is a given name. Notable people with the name include:

- Donell Cooper (born 1990), American basketball player in the Israeli Basketball Premier League
- Donell Jones (born 1973), American R&B singer, songwriter and record producer
- Donell Nixon (born 1961), American former center and left fielder in Major League Baseball
- Donell Taylor (born 1982), American professional basketball player

== See also ==
- Donnell, a surname and given name
