= Morris Township, Stevens County, Minnesota =

Morris Township, Minnesota
- Township
- Location within the state of Minnesota Morris Township, Minnesota (the United States)
- Coordinates: 45°37′18″N 95°56′2″W
- Country: United States
- State: Minnesota
- County: Stevens

Area
  - Total: 33.8 sq mi (87.6 km^{2})
  - Land: 33.2 sq mi (86.1 km^{2})
  - Water: 0.58 sq mi (1.5 km^{2})
- Elevation: 1,132 ft (345 m)

Population (2000)
  - Total: 574
  - Density: 17/sq mi (6.7/km^{2})
- Time zone: UTC-6 (Central (CST))
  - Summer (DST): UTC-5 (CDT)
- ZIP code: 56267
- Area code: 320
- FIPS code: 27-44260
- GNIS feature ID: 0665038

Morris Township is a township in Stevens County, Minnesota, United States. The population was 393 at the 2020 census.

Morris Township was established in 1871.

== Geography ==
According to the United States Census Bureau, the township has a total area of 33.8 square miles (87.6 km^{2}), of which 33.2 square miles (86.1 km^{2}) is land and 0.6 square mile (1.5 km^{2}) (1.69%) is water.

== Demographics ==
As of the census of 2000, there were 574 people, 194 households, and 157 families residing in the township. The population density was 17.3 inhabitants per square mile (6.7/km^{2}). There were 201 housing units at an average density of 6.0 per square mile (2.3/km^{2}). The racial makeup of the township was 97.56% White, 0.52% Native American, 0.35% Asian, and 1.57% from two or more races.

There were 194 households, out of which 44.3% had children under the age of 18 living with them, 77.8% were married couples living together, 1.5% had a female householder with no husband present, and 18.6% were non-families. 14.9% of all households were made up of individuals, and 7.2% had someone living alone who was 65 years of age or older. The average household size was 2.96 and the average family size was 3.31.

In the township the population was spread out, with 32.1% under the age of 18, 6.4% from 18 to 24, 25.8% from 25 to 44, 24.7% from 45 to 64, and 11.0% who were 65 years of age or older. The median age was 38 years. For every 100 females, there were 108.7 males. For every 100 females age 18 and over, there were 101.0 males.

The median income for a household in the township was $49,904, and the median income for a family was $56,875. Males had a median income of $34,625 versus $26,364 for females. The per capita income for the township was $19,630. About 2.3% of families and 3.9% of the population were below the poverty line, including 2.4% of those under age 18 and none of those age 65 or over.
