= Stevens County, Minnesota =

County in Minnesota, United States

- County
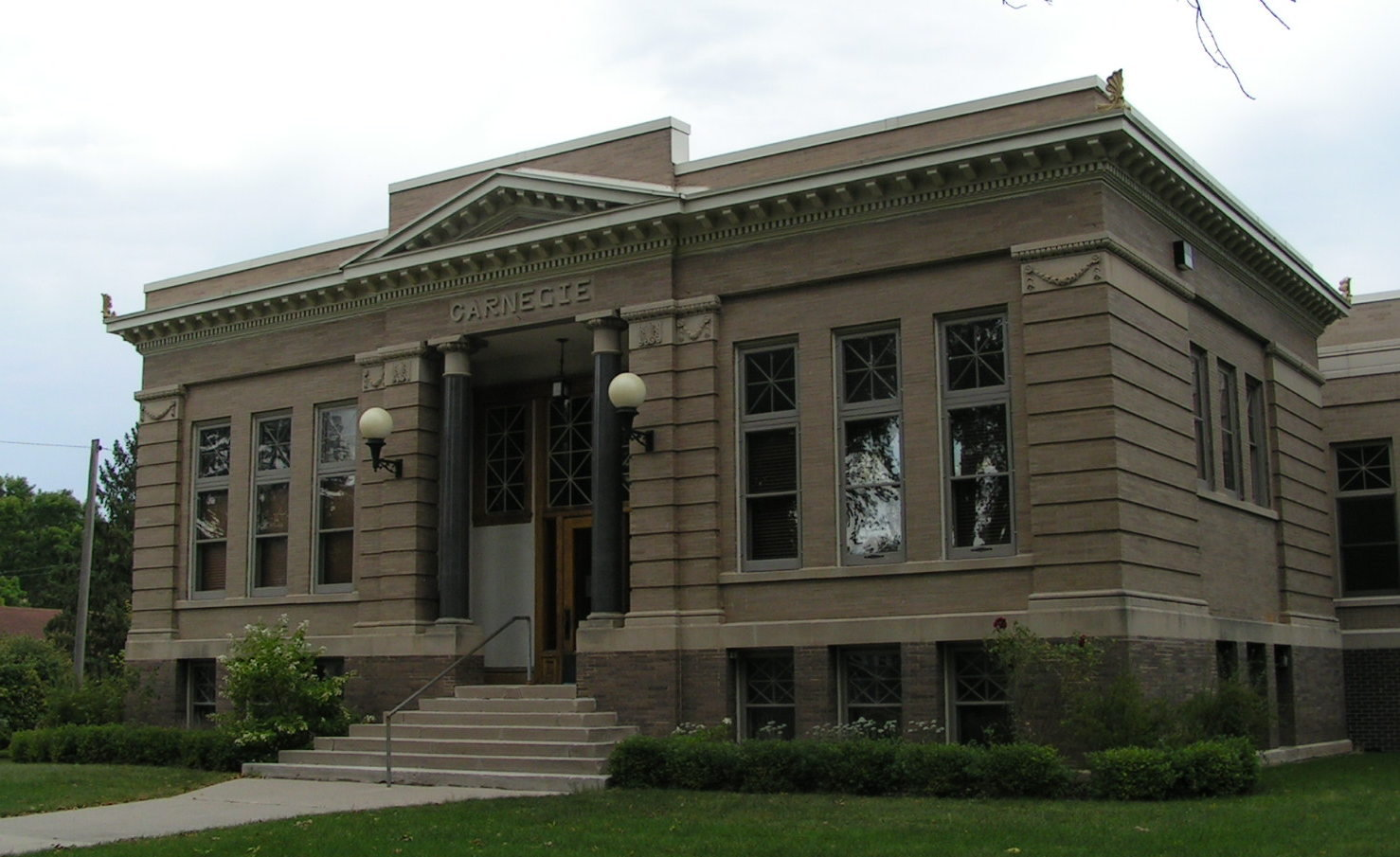
- Carnegie Library in Morris.

- Location within the U.S. state of Minnesota
- Coordinates: 45°35′N 96°00′W
- Country: United States
- State: Minnesota
- Founded: February 20, 1862
- Named for: Isaac Ingalls Stevens
- Seat: Morris
- Largest city: Morris

Area
  - Total: 575 sq mi (1,490 km^{2})
  - Land: 564 sq mi (1,460 km^{2})
  - Water: 12 sq mi (31 km^{2}) 2.0%

Population (2020)
  - Total: 9,671
  - Estimate (2025): 9,747 ▲
  - Density: 17.1/sq mi (6.6/km^{2})
- Time zone: UTC−6 (Central)
  - Summer (DST): UTC−5 (CDT)
- Congressional district: 7th
- Website: www.stevenscountymn.gov

Stevens County is a county in the U.S. state of Minnesota. As of the 2020 census, the population was 9,671. Its county seat is Morris.

== History ==
The county was created by act of the Minnesota legislature on February 20, 1862. It was not organized at that time, and no county seat was named. The county was named for Isaac Stevens, who had led a railroad survey party across Minnesota in 1853 and was influential in bringing national attention to the Minnesota Territory. The territorial legislature had intended to thus honor Stevens in 1855 when another county was being created, but a clerical error caused that county to be named Stearns. The error was corrected by the 1862 act; by that time Stevens was a brigadier general for the Union Army in the American Civil War. Stevens was killed later that year. The county government was organized in 1872. Morris, which had been platted in 1869, was named the county seat.

The University of Minnesota Morris is in Morris. It was developed in the early 20th century from the Morris Industrial School for Indians, which opened in 1887 and was originally operated by the Roman Catholic Sisters of Mercy under contract to the federal government.

In 1975, a moderate earthquake occurred in the county.

== Geography ==
The Pomme de Terre River flows south through central Stevens County, on its way to discharge into the Minnesota River. The county's terrain consists of rolling hills, with the area mostly devoted to agriculture. The terrain generally slopes to the south, although the northeast and southwest portions rise from the central part of the county. The county's highest point is on the eastern portion of the northern border, at 1,250 ft (380 m) ASL. The county has an area of 575 square miles (1,490 km^{2}), of which 564 square miles (1,460 km^{2}) is land and 12 square miles (31 km^{2}) (2.0%) is water.

Soils of Stevens County

=== Major highways ===
- U.S. Highway 59
- Minnesota State Highway 9
- Minnesota State Highway 28
- Minnesota State Highway 329

=== Adjacent counties ===
- Grant County - north
- Douglas County - northeast
- Pope County - east
- Swift County - south
- Big Stone County - southwest
- Traverse County - northwest

=== Protected areas ===
- Alberta Marsh State Wildlife Management Area
- Boekholt Grove State Wildlife Management Area
- Bruillet State Wildlife Management Area
- Cin State Wildlife Management Area
- Dablow State Wildlife Management Area
- Dolven State Wildlife Management Area
- Everglade State Wildlife Management Area
- Klason State Wildlife Management Area
- Kline State Wildlife Management Area
- Mathison State Wildlife Management Area
- Muddy Creek State Wildlife Management Area
- Reimers State Wildlife Management Area
- Robertson State Wildlife Management Area
- Selk State Wildlife Management Area
- Thedin State Wildlife Management Area
- Verlyn Marth Memorial Prairie Scientific and Natural Area

== Demographics ==
Historical population
Census	Pop.	Note	%±
1870	174		—
1880	3,911		2,147.7%
1890	5,251		34.3%
1900	8,721		66.1%
1910	8,293		−4.9%
1920	9,778		17.9%
1930	10,185		4.2%
1940	11,039		8.4%
1950	11,106		0.6%
1960	11,262		1.4%
1970	11,218		−0.4%
1980	11,322		0.9%
1990	10,634		−6.1%
2000	10,053		−5.5%
2010	9,726		−3.3%
2020	9,671		−0.6%
2025 (est.)	9,747	▲	0.8%
U.S. Decennial Census; 1790-1960 1900-1990; 1990-2000 2010-2020

=== Racial and ethnic composition ===
Stevens County, Minnesota – Racial and ethnic composition Note: the US Census treats Hispanic/Latino as an ethnic category. This table excludes Latinos from the racial categories and assigns them to a separate category. Hispanics/Latinos may be of any race.
Race / Ethnicity (NH = Non-Hispanic)	Pop 1980	Pop 1990	Pop 2000	Pop 2010	Pop 2020	% 1980	% 1990	% 2000	% 2010	% 2020
White alone (NH)	11,128	10,343	9,627	8,931	8,093	98.29%	97.26%	95.76%	91.83%	83.68%
Black or African American alone (NH)	51	56	92	75	84	0.45%	0.53%	0.92%	0.77%	0.87%
Native American or Alaska Native alone (NH)	14	50	67	81	110	0.12%	0.47%	0.67%	0.83%	1.14%
Asian alone (NH)	59	116	86	146	68	0.52%	1.09%	0.86%	1.50%	0.70%
Native Hawaiian or Pacific Islander alone (NH)	x	x	1	1	1	x	x	0.01%	0.01%	0.01%
Other race alone (NH)	21	13	4	3	40	0.19%	0.12%	0.04%	0.03%	0.41%
Mixed race or Multiracial (NH)	x	x	86	152	289	x	x	0.86%	1.56%	2.99%
Hispanic or Latino (any race)	49	56	90	337	986	0.43%	0.53%	0.90%	3.46%	10.20%
Total	11,322	10,634	10,053	9,726	9,671	100.00%	100.00%	100.00%	100.00%	100.00%

=== 2020 census ===
As of the 2020 census, the county had a population of 9,671. The median age was 34.7 years. 23.2% of residents were under the age of 18 and 17.5% of residents were 65 years of age or older. For every 100 females there were 100.3 males, and for every 100 females age 18 and over there were 98.8 males age 18 and over.

The racial makeup of the county was 85.3% White, 0.9% Black or African American, 1.8% American Indian and Alaska Native, 0.7% Asian, <0.1% Native Hawaiian and Pacific Islander, 6.2% from some other race, and 5.1% from two or more races. Hispanic or Latino residents of any race comprised 10.2% of the population.

52.0% of residents lived in urban areas, while 48.0% lived in rural areas.

There were 3,697 households in the county, of which 29.6% had children under the age of 18 living in them. Of all households, 52.3% were married-couple households, 19.7% were households with a male householder and no spouse or partner present, and 22.6% were households with a female householder and no spouse or partner present. About 30.7% of all households were made up of individuals and 13.2% had someone living alone who was 65 years of age or older.

There were 4,213 housing units, of which 12.2% were vacant. Among occupied housing units, 67.4% were owner-occupied and 32.6% were renter-occupied. The homeowner vacancy rate was 2.6% and the rental vacancy rate was 13.8%.

=== 2000 census ===
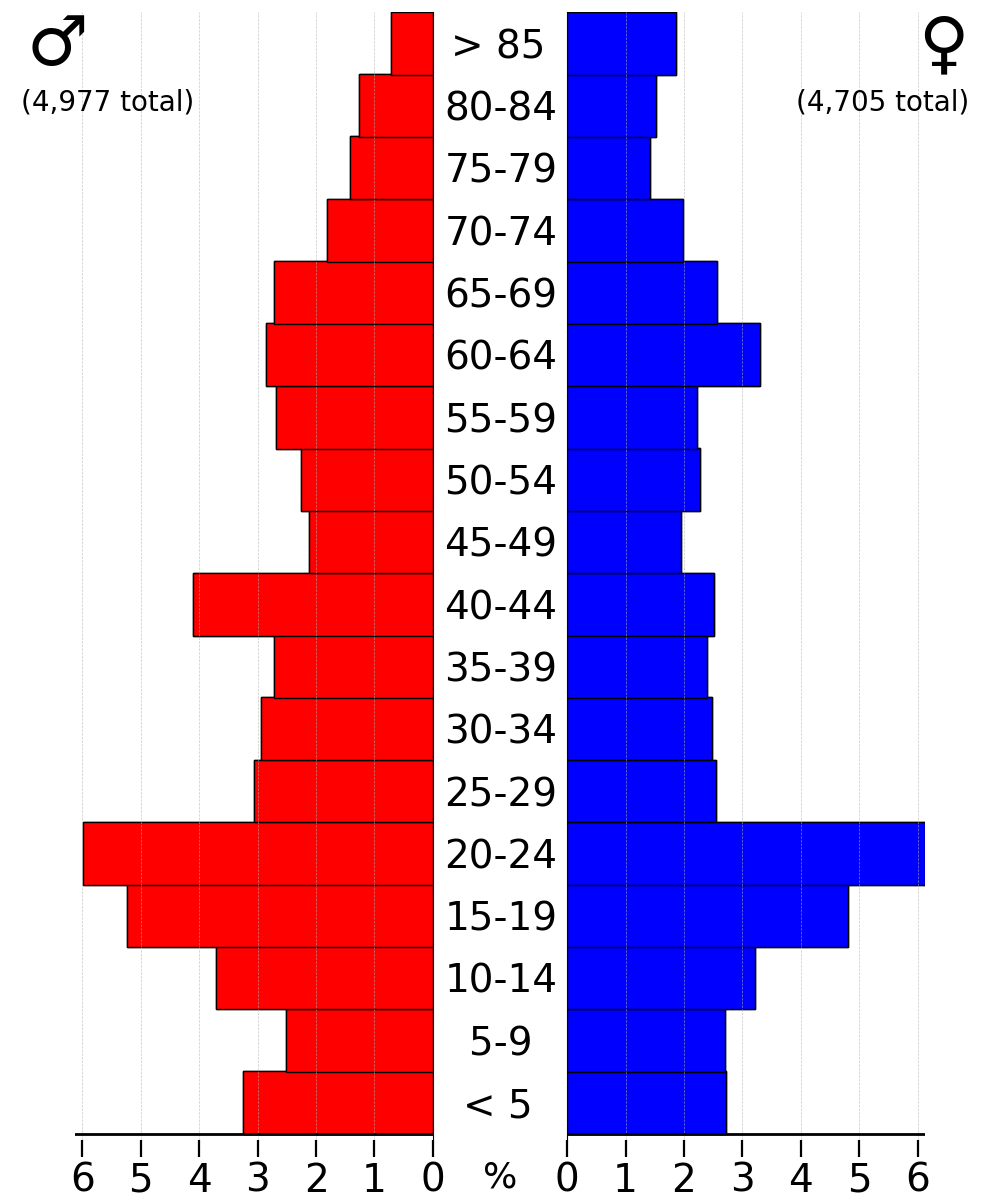
2022 US Census population pyramid for Stevens County, from ACS 5-year estimates

As of the census of 2000, there were 10,053 people, 3,751 households, and 2,366 families in the county. The population density was 17.8 per square mile (6.9/km^{2}). There were 4,074 housing units at an average density of 7.22 per square mile (2.79/km^{2}). The racial makeup of the county was 96.13% White, 0.92% Black or African American, 0.70% Native American, 0.86% Asian, 0.02% Pacific Islander, 0.38% from other races, and 1.00% from two or more races. 0.90% of the population were Hispanic or Latino of any race. 44.8% were of German, 20.8% Norwegian and 5.4% Irish ancestry.

There were 3,751 households, out of which 28.60% had children under the age of 18 living with them, 55.40% were married couples living together, 5.10% had a female householder with no husband present, and 36.90% were non-families. 29.10% of all households were made up of individuals, and 14.20% had someone living alone who was 65 years of age or older. The average household size was 2.43 and the average family size was 2.99.

The county population contained 21.60% under the age of 18, 20.80% from 18 to 24, 21.60% from 25 to 44, 19.00% from 45 to 64, and 17.00% who were 65 years of age or older. The median age was 34 years. For every 100 females there were 93.90 males. For every 100 females age 18 and over, there were 91.00 males.

The median income for a household in the county was $37,267, and the median income for a family was $47,518. Males had a median income of $32,045 versus $21,681 for females. The per capita income for the county was $17,569. About 5.70% of families and 13.60% of the population were below the poverty line, including 6.50% of those under age 18 and 11.30% of those age 65 or over.

== Communities ==
=== Cities ===
- Alberta
- Chokio
- Donnelly
- Hancock
- Morris (county seat)

=== Townships ===
- Baker Township
- Darnen Township
- Donnelly Township
- Eldorado Township
- Everglade Township
- Framnas Township
- Hodges Township
- Horton Township
- Moore Township
- Morris Township
- Pepperton Township
- Rendsville Township
- Scott Township
- Stevens Township
- Swan Lake Township
- Synnes Township

== Government and politics ==
Stevens County has been a swing district for the past several decades. As of 2020 it has selected the Republican candidate in 56% of presidential elections since 1980. In 2016, Stevens County and several other counties in rural Western Minnesota swung sharply to the right. While Minnesota as a whole swung far to the left in 2020, Stevens County swung further right, giving Donald Trump nearly 60% of the vote - the most any party had got since 1952. Trump received nearly 63% of the county's vote in 2024, again the best performance for a Republican presidential candidate since 1952.

United States presidential election results for Stevens County, Minnesota
Year	Republican		Democratic		Third party(ies)	
Year	No.	%	No.	%	No.	%
1892	622	46.21%	509	37.82%	215	15.97%
1896	981	57.40%	685	40.08%	43	2.52%
1900	1,036	58.01%	682	38.19%	68	3.81%
1904	1,254	75.13%	362	21.69%	53	3.18%
1908	877	57.93%	582	38.44%	55	3.63%
1912	286	17.40%	640	38.93%	718	43.67%
1916	943	52.56%	787	43.87%	64	3.57%
1920	2,339	79.83%	457	15.60%	134	4.57%
1924	1,553	48.99%	238	7.51%	1,379	43.50%
1928	2,275	60.70%	1,457	38.87%	16	0.43%
1932	1,396	34.99%	2,552	63.96%	42	1.05%
1936	1,431	36.15%	2,352	59.42%	175	4.42%
1940	2,619	56.30%	2,018	43.38%	15	0.32%
1944	2,377	58.23%	1,693	41.47%	12	0.29%
1948	1,928	45.02%	2,313	54.00%	42	0.98%
1952	3,288	67.39%	1,579	32.36%	12	0.25%
1956	2,606	58.83%	1,822	41.13%	2	0.05%
1960	2,710	52.87%	2,405	46.92%	11	0.21%
1964	2,220	43.22%	2,910	56.65%	7	0.14%
1968	2,560	50.57%	2,247	44.39%	255	5.04%
1972	2,830	48.70%	2,870	49.39%	111	1.91%
1976	2,484	42.91%	3,171	54.78%	134	2.31%
1980	3,283	50.69%	2,559	39.52%	634	9.79%
1984	3,251	56.58%	2,451	42.66%	44	0.77%
1988	2,679	49.08%	2,721	49.85%	58	1.06%
1992	2,229	38.33%	2,466	42.40%	1,121	19.27%
1996	2,141	39.25%	2,741	50.25%	573	10.50%
2000	2,831	49.22%	2,434	42.32%	487	8.47%
2004	3,030	50.93%	2,821	47.42%	98	1.65%
2008	2,710	48.10%	2,781	49.36%	143	2.54%
2012	2,766	48.94%	2,742	48.51%	144	2.55%
2016	2,799	51.85%	2,116	39.20%	483	8.95%
2020	3,044	59.86%	1,922	37.80%	119	2.34%
2024	3,213	62.52%	1,827	35.55%	99	1.93%

County Board of Commissioners
Position	Name	District
Commissioner and Chairperson	Bob Kopitzke	District 1
Commissioner	Jeanne Ennen	District 2
Commissioner	Ron Staples	District 3
Commissioner	Donnie Wohlers	District 4
Commissioner	Patricia Lesmeister-Nelson	District 5

State Legislature (2018-2020)
Position	Name	Affiliation	District
Senate	Torrey Westrom	Republican	District 12
House of Representatives	Jeff Backer	Republican	District 12A

U.S Congress (2018-2020)
Position	Name	Affiliation	District
House of Representatives	Michelle Fischbach	Republican	7th
Senate	Amy Klobuchar	Democrat	N/A
Senate	Tina Smith	Democrat	N/A

== See also ==
- National Register of Historic Places listings in Stevens County, Minnesota
