= Dunnell =

Dunnell may refer to:

== People ==
- Francis Dunnell (1868–1960), English solicitor and civil servant
- Karen Dunnell (born 1946), British medical sociologist and civil servant
- Mark H. Dunnell (1823–1904), American politician
- Milt Dunnell (1905–2008), Canadian sportswriter
- Robert Dunnell (1942–2010), American theoretical archaeologist

== Places ==
- Dunnell, Minnesota, United States
