= Synnes Township, Stevens County, Minnesota =

Synnes Township, Minnesota
- Township
- Location within the state of Minnesota Synnes Township, Minnesota (the United States)
- Coordinates: 45°27′20″N 96°3′58″W
- Country: United States
- State: Minnesota
- County: Stevens

Area
  - Total: 35.8 sq mi (92.7 km^{2})
  - Land: 35.5 sq mi (91.9 km^{2})
  - Water: 0.31 sq mi (0.8 km^{2})
- Elevation: 1,122 ft (342 m)

Population (2000)
  - Total: 104
  - Density: 2.8/sq mi (1.1/km^{2})
- Time zone: UTC-6 (Central (CST))
  - Summer (DST): UTC-5 (CDT)
- FIPS code: 27-63976
- GNIS feature ID: 0654546

Synnes Township is a township in Stevens County, Minnesota, United States. The population was 136 at the 2020 census.

Synnes Township was named after a place in Scandinavia.

== Geography ==
According to the United States Census Bureau, the township has a total area of 35.8 square miles (92.7 km^{2}), of which 35.5 square miles (91.9 km^{2}) is land and 0.3 square mile (0.8 km^{2}) (0.89%) is water.

== Demographics ==
As of the census of 2000, there were 104 people, 34 households, and 29 families residing in the township. The population density was 2.9 people per square mile (1.1/km^{2}). There were 37 housing units at an average density of 1.0/sq mi (0.4/km^{2}). The racial makeup of the township was 93.27% White, 0.96% Asian, 1.92% from other races, and 3.85% from two or more races. Hispanic or Latino of any race were 5.77% of the population.

There were 34 households, out of which 38.2% had children under the age of 18 living with them, 82.4% were married couples living together, and 11.8% were non-families. 5.9% of all households were made up of individuals, and 2.9% had someone living alone who was 65 years of age or older. The average household size was 3.06 and the average family size was 3.23.

In the township the population was spread out, with 31.7% under the age of 18, 4.8% from 18 to 24, 24.0% from 25 to 44, 24.0% from 45 to 64, and 15.4% who were 65 years of age or older. The median age was 38 years. For every 100 females, there were 126.1 males. For every 100 females age 18 and over, there were 115.2 males.

The median income for a household in the township was $41,250, and the median income for a family was $43,750. Males had a median income of $31,042 versus $13,750 for females. The per capita income for the township was $16,386. There were no families and 0.9% of the population living below the poverty line, including no under eighteens and none of those over 64.
