= Everglade Township, Stevens County, Minnesota =

Everglade Township, Minnesota
- Township
- Location within the state of Minnesota Everglade Township, Minnesota (the United States)
- Coordinates: 45°38′11″N 96°10′54″W
- Country: United States
- State: Minnesota
- County: Stevens

Area
  - Total: 36.1 sq mi (93.5 km^{2})
  - Land: 36.1 sq mi (93.4 km^{2})
  - Water: 0.039 sq mi (0.1 km^{2})
- Elevation: 1,106 ft (337 m)

Population (2000)
  - Total: 128
  - Density: 3.6/sq mi (1.4/km^{2})
- Time zone: UTC-6 (Central (CST))
  - Summer (DST): UTC-5 (CDT)
- FIPS code: 27-19970
- GNIS feature ID: 0664118

Everglade Township is a township in Stevens County, Minnesota, United States. The population was 104 at the 2020 census.

Everglade Township was named after the Everglades in Florida.

== Geography ==
According to the United States Census Bureau, the township has a total area of 36.1 square miles (93.5 km^{2}), of which 36.0 square miles (93.4 km^{2}) is land and 0.1 square mile (0.1 km^{2}) (0.14%) is water.

== Demographics ==
As of the census of 2000, there were 128 people, 47 households, and 35 families residing in the township. The population density was 3.6 inhabitants per square mile (1.4/km^{2}). There were 49 housing units at an average density of 1.4 per square mile (0.54/km^{2}). The racial makeup of the township was 99.22% White, and 0.78% from two or more races.

There were 47 households, out of which 36.2% had children under the age of 18 living with them, 68.1% were married couples living together, 4.3% had a female householder with no husband present, and 25.5% were non-families. 23.4% of all households were made up of individuals, and 14.9% had someone living alone who was 65 years of age or older. The average household size was 2.72 and the average family size was 3.20.

In the township the population was spread out, with 28.9% under the age of 18, 7.8% from 18 to 24, 25.0% from 25 to 44, 22.7% from 45 to 64, and 15.6% who were 65 years of age or older. The median age was 40 years. For every 100 females, there were 109.8 males. For every 100 females age 18 and over, there were 116.7 males.

The median income for a household in the township was $56,042, and the median income for a family was $57,292. Males had a median income of $32,188 versus $11,250 for females. The per capita income for the township was $21,022. There were no families and 1.4% of the population living below the poverty line, including no under eighteens and 8.7% of those over 64.
