= Donnell, Missouri =

Unincorporated community in Missouri, U.S.

Coordinates: 38°12′49″N 90°27′32″W

Donnell is an unincorporated community in Jefferson County, in the U.S. state of Missouri.

The community has the name of Eli Donnell, an early settler.
