= Donnell Irrais =

Donnell Irrais Ó Conchobair was a Gaelic-Irish lord, fl. 1272–74.

Donell was a member of the Clan Muircheartaigh Uí Conchobhair. His father was Manus mac Muircheartaigh Muimhneach. In 1273, following the murder of Henry Butler, Lord of Umallia, he was banished from Umallia and Erris.

The Annals of the Four Masters, sub anno 1274, state Tiernan, son of Hugh O'Rourke, Lord of Breifny, and Donnell, son of Manus, who was son of Murtough Muimhneach, most illustrious throughout all Ireland for hospitality and prowess, died.
