= Guzmania donnellsmithii =

Scientific classification
- Kingdom: Plantae
- Clade: Tracheophytes
- Clade: Angiosperms
- Clade: Monocots
- Clade: Commelinids
- Order: Poales
- Family: Bromeliaceae
- Genus: Guzmania
- Species: G. donnellsmithii

Binomial name
- Guzmania donnellsmithii Mez ex Donn.Sm.

Synonyms
- Schlumbergeria donnellsmithii (Mez ex Donn.Sm.) Harms; Thecophyllum angustum Mez & Wercklé; Guzmania donnell-smithii Mez ex Donn.Sm., spelling variation

Species of flowering plant

Guzmania donnellsmithii is a plant species in the genus Guzmania. This species is native to Costa Rica, Panama, Nicaragua, and Ecuador.

== Cultivars ==
- Guzmania 'Claudine'
- Guzmania 'Fantasia'
- Guzmania 'Marlebeca'
