= Swan Lake Township, Stevens County, Minnesota =

Swan Lake Township, Minnesota
- Township
- Location within the state of Minnesota Swan Lake Township, Minnesota (the United States)
- Coordinates: 45°43′36″N 95°49′17″W
- Country: United States
- State: Minnesota
- County: Stevens

Area
  - Total: 36.1 sq mi (93.4 km^{2})
  - Land: 33.4 sq mi (86.5 km^{2})
  - Water: 2.6 sq mi (6.8 km^{2})
- Elevation: 1,224 ft (373 m)

Population (2000)
  - Total: 210
  - Density: 6.2/sq mi (2.4/km^{2})
- Time zone: UTC-6 (Central (CST))
  - Summer (DST): UTC-5 (CDT)
- FIPS code: 27-63724
- GNIS feature ID: 0665748

Swan Lake Township is a township in Stevens County, Minnesota, United States. The population was 189 at the 2020 census.

== Geography ==
According to the United States Census Bureau, the township has a total area of 36.0 square miles (93.4 km^{2}), of which 33.4 square miles (86.6 km^{2}) is land and 2.6 square miles (6.8 km^{2}) (7.30%) is water.

== Demographics ==
As of the census of 2000, there were 210 people, 80 households, and 65 families residing in the township. The population density was 6.3 people per square mile (2.4/km^{2}). There were 102 housing units at an average density of 3.1/sq mi (1.2/km^{2}). The racial makeup of the township was 99.05% White, 0.48% Pacific Islander, 0.48% from other races. Hispanic or Latino of any race were 0.95% of the population.

There were 80 households, out of which 36.3% had children under the age of 18 living with them, 78.8% were married couples living together, 1.3% had a female householder with no husband present, and 18.8% were non-families. 18.8% of all households were made up of individuals, and 6.3% had someone living alone who was 65 years of age or older. The average household size was 2.63 and the average family size was 2.94.

In the township the population was spread out, with 24.8% under the age of 18, 5.7% from 18 to 24, 25.2% from 25 to 44, 32.4% from 45 to 64, and 11.9% who were 65 years of age or older. The median age was 42 years. For every 100 females, there were 92.7 males. For every 100 females age 18 and over, there were 110.7 males.

The median income for a household in the township was $39,375, and the median income for a family was $44,375. Males had a median income of $29,375 versus $18,125 for females. The per capita income for the township was $15,789. About 1.6% of families and 6.0% of the population were below the poverty line, including 6.7% of those under the age of eighteen and 14.3% of those 65 or over.
