= Deborah Donnell =

New Zealand and American biostatistician

Deborah J. Donnell is a New Zealand and American biostatistician known for her research on the prevention of HIV infection. She is a professor in the Vaccine and Infectious Disease Division and Public Health Sciences Division of the Fred Hutchinson Cancer Research Center, and an affiliate professor of global health and health services at the University of Washington.

== Education and career ==
Donnell earned bachelor's and master's degrees at the University of Auckland in 1980 and 1982, respectively, before coming to the US as a Fulbright Scholar and completing her Ph.D. in 1987 at the University of Washington.

== Recognition ==
Donnell was named a Fellow of the American Association for the Advancement of Science in 2020, in the statistics section of the AAAS, "for distinguished contributions to the field of HIV prevention research, particularly for design and analysis of clinical trials of pre-exposure prophylaxis and treatment as prevention".
