= Donnelly (disambiguation) =

Donnelly is an Irish surname.

Donnelly may also refer to:

== Places ==
=== Australia ===
- Donnelly River, Western Australia, a village

=== Canada ===
- Donnelly, Alberta

=== United States ===
- Donnelly, Alaska
- Donnelly, Idaho
- Donnelly, Minnesota
- Donnelly Township, Marshall County, Minnesota
- Donnelly Township, Stevens County, Minnesota

== People with the given name ==
- Donnelly Rhodes (1937–2018), Canadian actor

== Entertainment ==
- The Black Donnellys, 2007 American television drama that debuted on NBC
