= Donnelly Township, Stevens County, Minnesota =

Donnelly Township, Minnesota
- Township
- Location within the state of Minnesota Donnelly Township, Minnesota (the United States)
- Coordinates: 45°43′24″N 96°4′43″W
- Country: United States
- State: Minnesota
- County: Stevens

Area
  - Total: 34.1 sq mi (88.2 km^{2})
  - Land: 33.4 sq mi (86.4 km^{2})
  - Water: 0.73 sq mi (1.9 km^{2})
- Elevation: 1,096 ft (334 m)

Population (2000)
  - Total: 113
  - Density: 3.4/sq mi (1.3/km^{2})
- Time zone: UTC-6 (Central (CST))
  - Summer (DST): UTC-5 (CDT)
- ZIP code: 56235
- Area code: 320
- FIPS code: 27-16102
- GNIS feature ID: 0663991

Donnelly Township is a township in Stevens County, Minnesota, United States. The population was 89 at the 2020 census.

Donnelly Township was named for Ignatius L. Donnelly, a U.S. congressman from Minnesota.

== Geography ==
According to the United States Census Bureau, the township has a total area of 34.1 square miles (88 km^{2}), of which 33.3 square miles (86 km^{2}) is land and 0.7 square miles (1.8 km^{2}) (2.11%) is water.

== Demographics ==
As of the census of 2000, there were 113 people, 51 households, and 31 families residing in the township. The population density was 3.4 inhabitants per square mile (1.3/km^{2}). There were 53 housing units at an average density of 1.6 per square mile (0.62/km^{2}). The racial makeup of the township was 100.00% White.

There were 51 households, out of which 15.7% had children under the age of 18 living with them, 52.9% were married couples living together, 3.9% had a female householder with no husband present, and 37.3% were non-families. 31.4% of all households were made up of individuals, and 19.6% had someone living alone who was 65 years of age or older. The average household size was 2.22 and the average family size was 2.84.

In the township the population was spread out, with 17.7% under the age of 18, 3.5% from 18 to 24, 19.5% from 25 to 44, 28.3% from 45 to 64, and 31.0% who were 65 years of age or older. The median age was 50 years. For every 100 females, there were 130.6 males. For every 100 females age 18 and over, there were 138.5 males.

The median income for a household in the township was $44,750, and the median income for a family was $44,750. Males had a median income of $40,417 versus $22,500 for females. The per capita income for the township was $23,295. There were 5.4% of families and 11.4% of the population living below the poverty line, including 42.1% of under eighteens and 5.9% of those over 64.
