= Robert Dunnell =

American archaeologist (1942-2010)

Robert Chester Dunnell (December 4, 1942 – December 13, 2010) was an archaeologist known for his contribution in archaeological systematics, measurement and explanation of the archaeological record, evolutionary archaeology, and the archaeology of eastern North America. Dunnell received his PhD from Yale University in 1967. He was a professor of anthropology at the University of Washington until his retirement in 1996 after which he was emeritus at the University of Washington as well as Mississippi State University.

Among Dunnell's contribution to archaeology was the recognition of the role the theory of biological evolution as a means of explaining cultural phenomena. In addition, he argued that "cultural evolution" which has its roots in 19th Century social scientists such as Lewis Henry Morgan and Herbert Spencer is distinct from "scientific evolution" which Darwinian in character. Cultural evolution is vitalistic and assumes a direction to the nature of change (i.e., progress). Darwinian evolution, Dunnell argues, holds that evolution is a two-step process in which variability generation is separate from mechanisms that sort that variability. While advocating "scientific evolution" as the basis for anthropological theory, Dunnell argued that the use of a strictly biological model was insufficient to explain cultural variability. He argued that a more comprehensive version of evolutionary theory is needed that considered cultural inheritance as an additional means of the transmission of variability between individuals. Overall, Dunnell advocated the use of a Darwinian model. Dunnell's approach advocates the evolutionary model to explain (cultural) variation, while exposing the pitfalls of using analogy to explain historical events.

Dunnell's geographical interests included the U.S. Southeast.

== Selected bibliography ==
- Dunnell, Robert C., 1978. Style and Function: A Fundamental Dichotomy. American Antiquity, 43(2), pp. 192–202.
- Dunnell, Robert C., 1980. Evolutionary Theory and Archaeology. Advances in Archaeological Method and Theory, 3, pp. 35–99.
- Dunnell, Robert C., 1982. The Harvey Lecture Series. Science, Social Science, and Common Sense: The Agonizing Dilemma of Modern Archaeology. Journal of Anthropological Research, 38(1), pp. 1–25.
- Dunnell, Robert C., 1986. Five Decades of American Archaeology. In D. Meltzer et al., eds. American Archaeology Past and Future. Washington, DC: Smithsonian Institution Press, pp. 23–52, ISBN 0874746922
- Dunnell, Robert C., 2002. Systematics in Prehistory. Caldwell, NJ: Blackburn Press. ISBN 1-930665-28-8.
