= National Register of Historic Places listings in Minnesota =

This is a list of sites in Minnesota which are included in the National Register of Historic Places. There are more than 1,700 properties and historic districts listed on the NRHP; each of Minnesota's 87 counties has at least 2 listings. Twenty-two sites are also National Historic Landmarks.

Minneapolis listings are in the Hennepin County list; St. Paul's listings are in the Ramsey County list.

This National Park Service list is complete through NPS recent listings posted September 25, 2026.

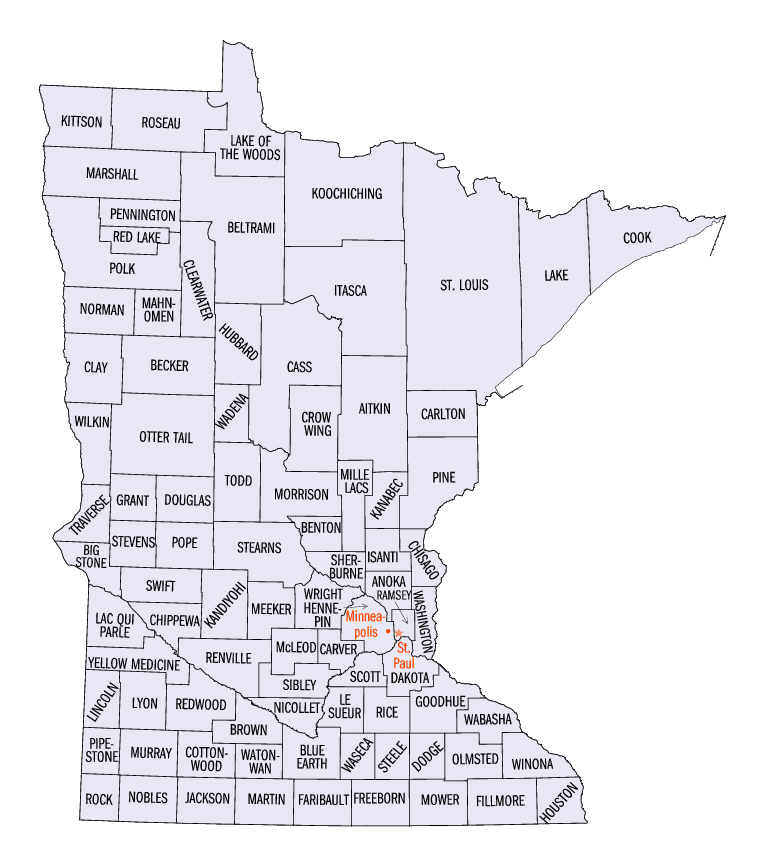
Minnesota counties

== Current listings by county ==
The following are approximate tallies of current listings by county. These counts are based on entries in the National Register Information Database as of April 24, 2008 and new weekly listings posted since then on the National Register of Historic Places web site. There are frequent additions to the listings and occasional delistings and the counts here are approximate and not official. New entries are added to the official Register on a weekly basis. Also, the counts in this table exclude boundary increase and decrease listings which modify the area covered by an existing property or district and which carry a separate National Register reference number. The numbers of NRHP listings in each county are documented by tables in each of the individual county list-articles.

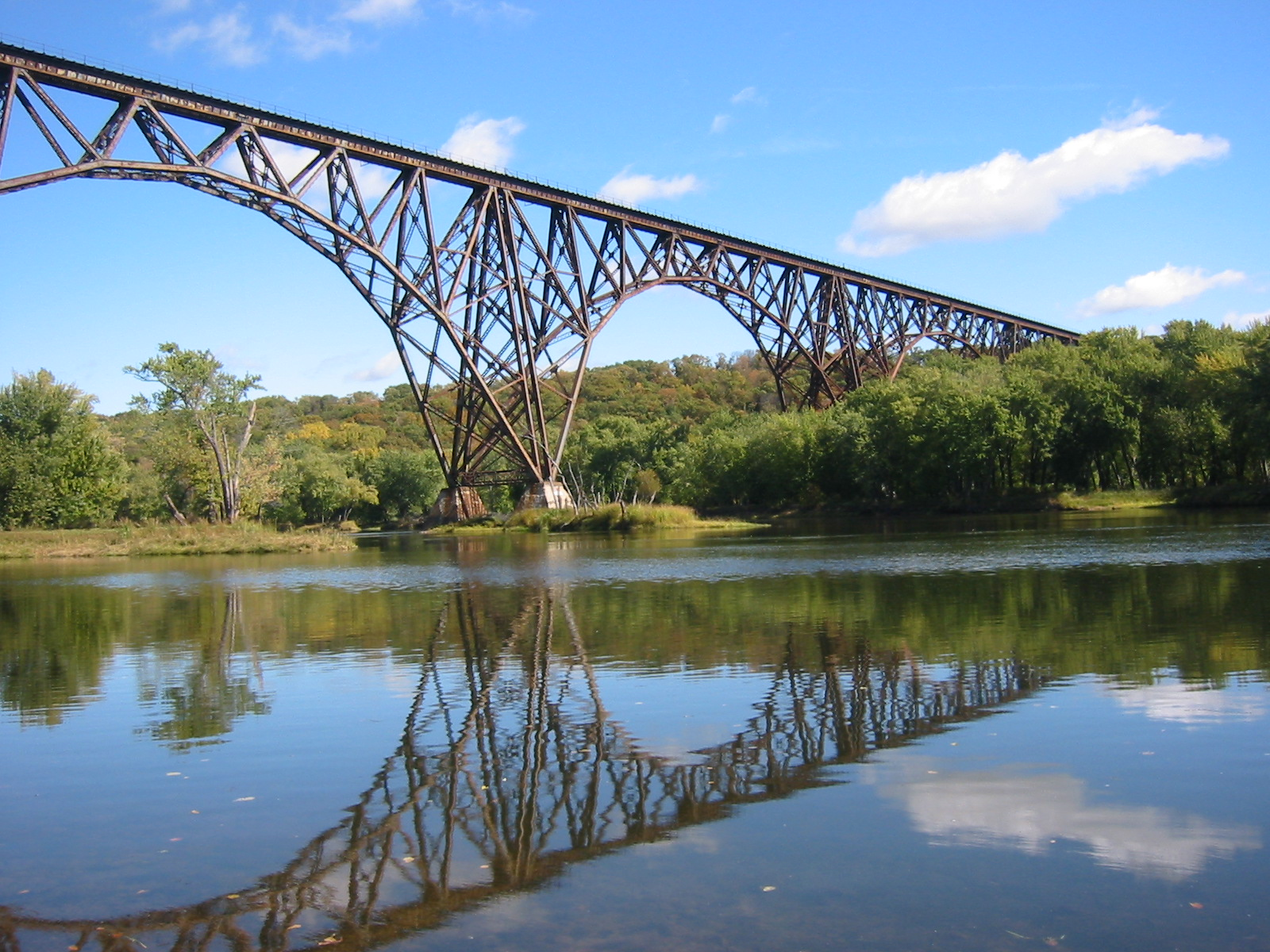
Soo Line High Bridge

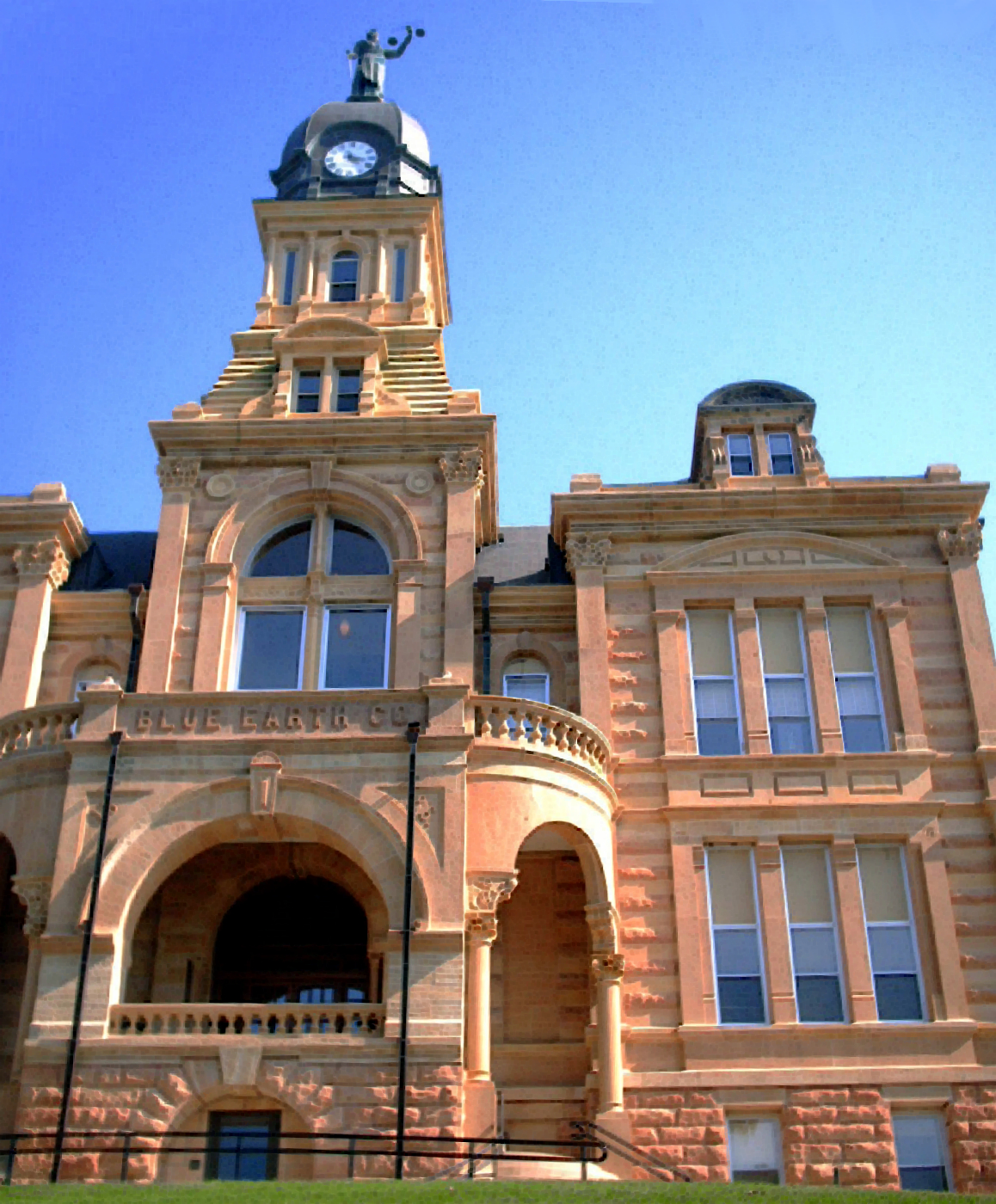
Blue Earth County Courthouse

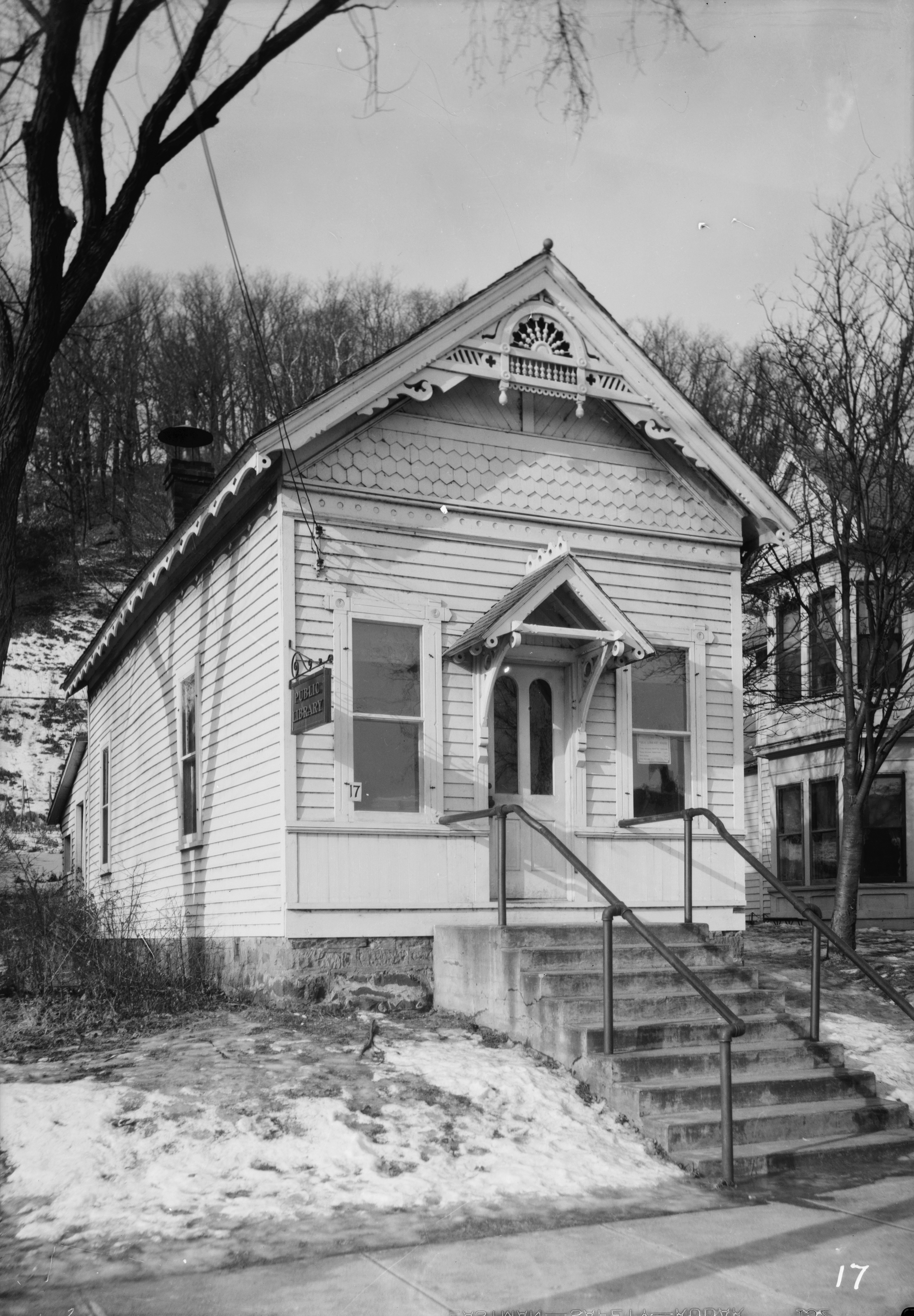
Taylors Falls Public Library

	County	# of Sites
1	Aitkin	12
2	Anoka	18
3	Becker	8
4	Beltrami	13
5	Benton	5
6	Big Stone	7
7	Blue Earth	28
8	Brown	39
9	Carlton	15
10	Carver	35
11	Cass	20
12	Chippewa	9
13	Chisago	18
14	Clay	22
15	Clearwater	5
16	Cook	15
17	Cottonwood	5
18	Crow Wing	37
19	Dakota	39
20	Dodge	10
21	Douglas	14
22	Faribault	13
23	Fillmore	37
24	Freeborn	7
25	Goodhue	63
26	Grant	6
27	Hennepin	196
28	Houston	16
29	Hubbard	6
30	Isanti	8
31	Itasca	20
32	Jackson	6
33	Kanabec	6
34	Kandiyohi	15
35	Kittson	5
36	Koochiching	14
37	Lac qui Parle	10
38	Lake	22
39	Lake of the Woods	4
40	Le Sueur	28
41	Lincoln	7
42	Lyon	12
43	Mahnomen	3
44	Marshall	3
45	Martin	9
46	McLeod	7
47	Meeker	11
48	Mille Lacs	12
49	Morrison	25
50	Mower	11
51	Murray	8
52	Nicollet	24
53	Nobles	12
54	Norman	5
55	Olmsted	25
56	Otter Tail	30
57	Pennington	4
58	Pine	21
59	Pipestone	15
60	Polk	6
61	Pope	11
62	Ramsey	130
63	Red Lake	2
64	Redwood	22
65	Renville	9
66	Rice	75
67	Rock	20
68	Roseau	4
69	St. Louis	136
70	Scott	21
71	Sherburne	5
72	Sibley	7
73	Stearns	35
74	Steele	12
75	Stevens	6
76	Swift	8
77	Todd	14
78	Traverse	5
79	Wabasha	25
80	Wadena	6
81	Waseca	12
82	Washington	44
83	Watonwan	6
84	Wilkin	6
85	Winona	49
86	Wright	20
87	Yellow Medicine	7
(duplicates)		(14)
Total:		1,783

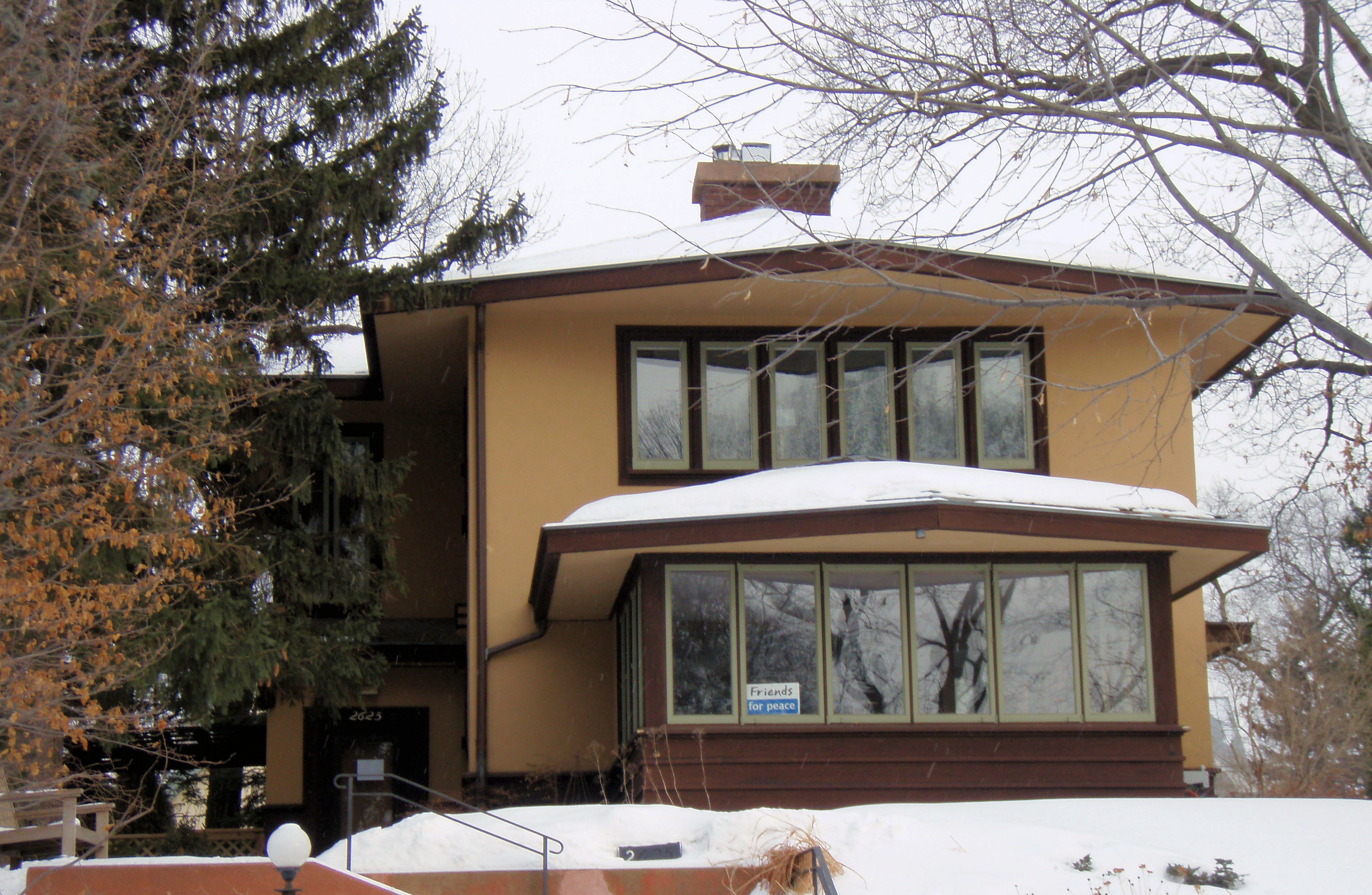
Dr. Oscar Owre House

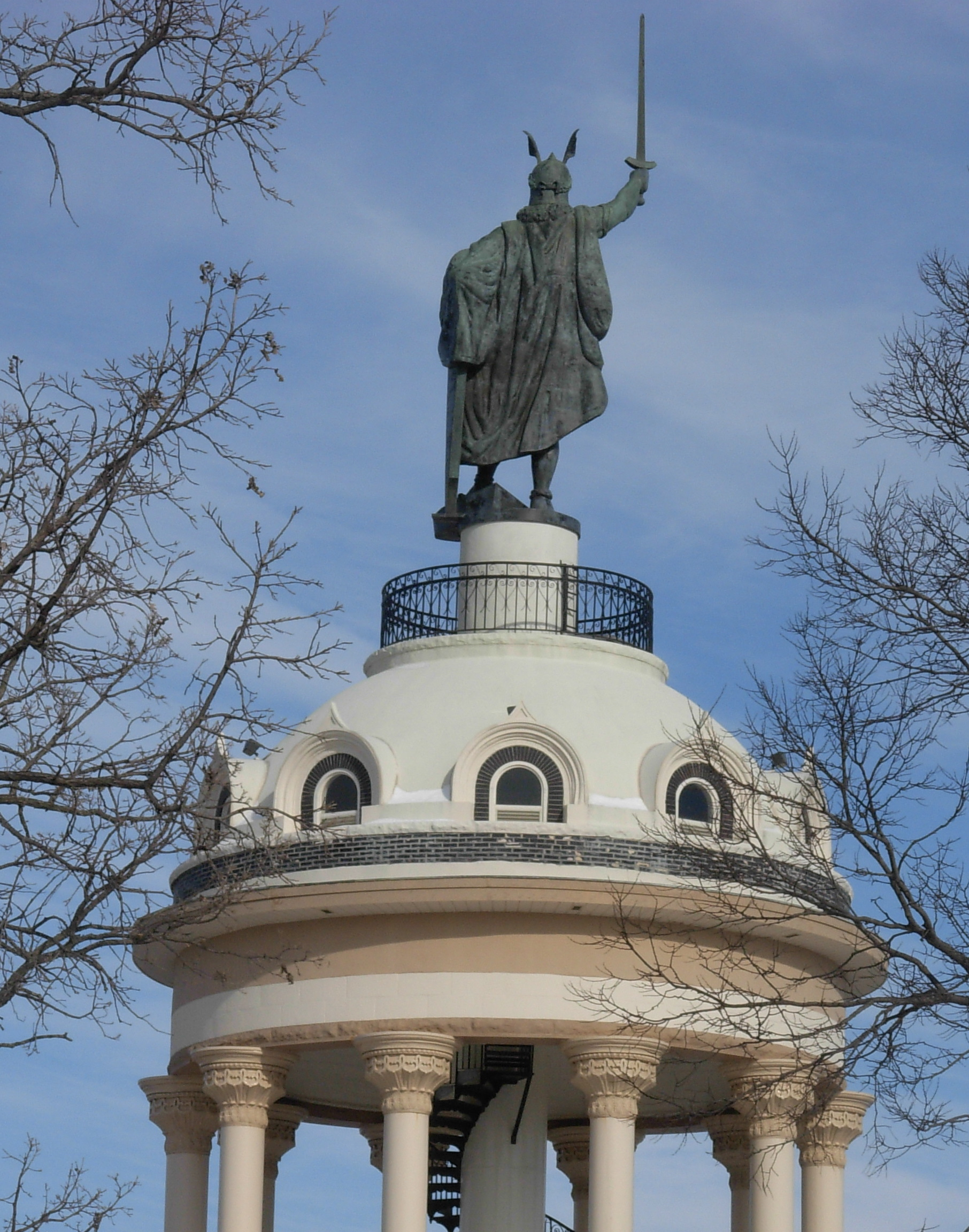
Hermann Monument

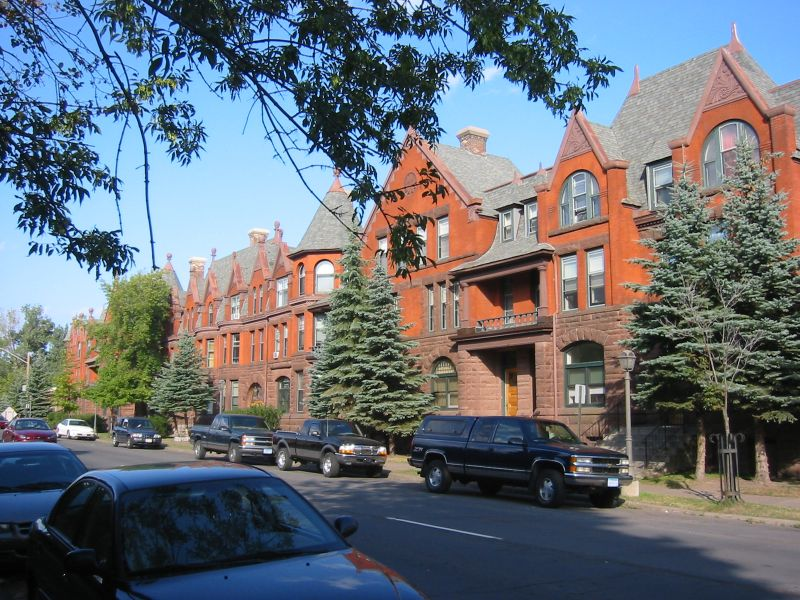
Chester Terrace (Duluth, Minnesota)

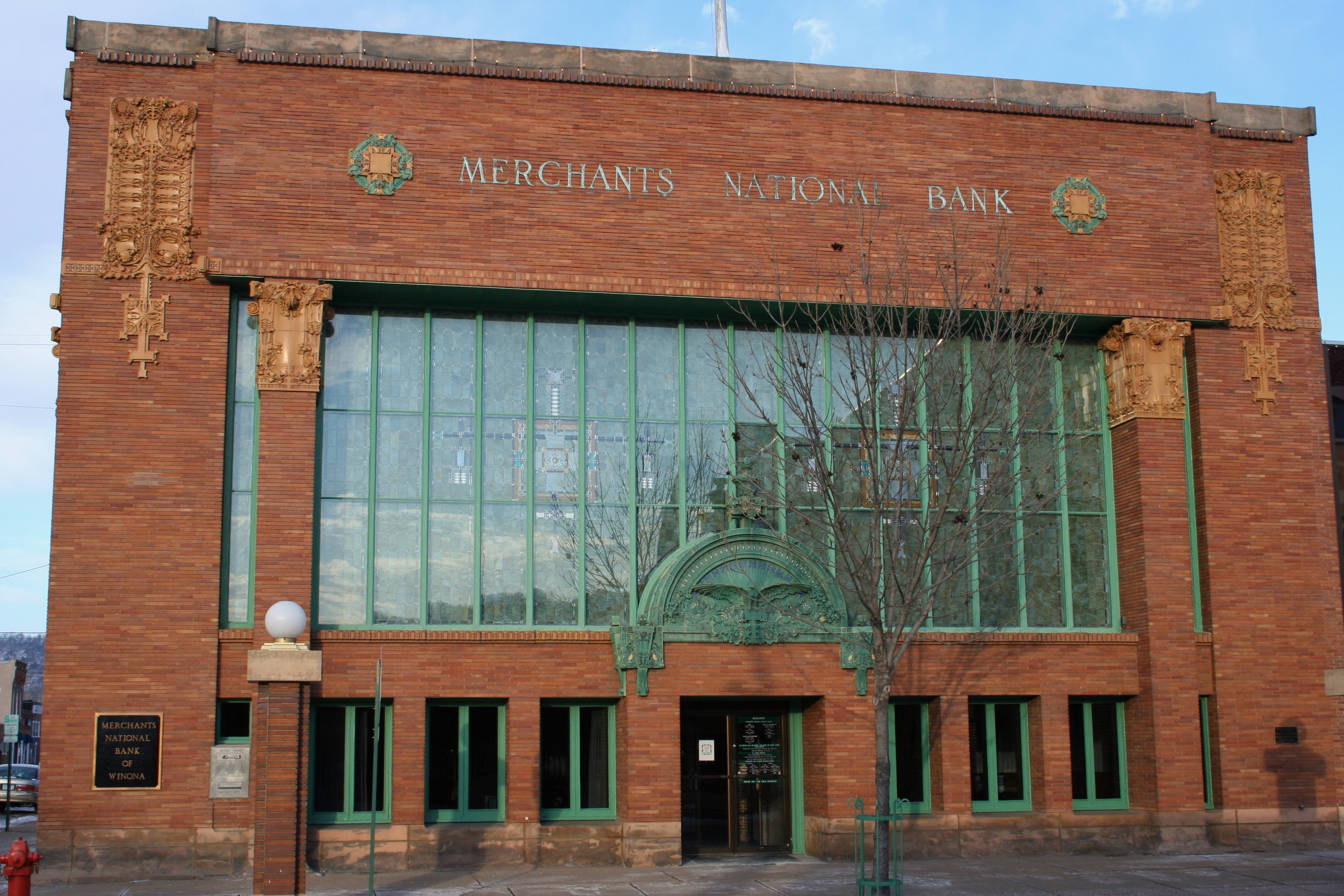
Merchants National Bank (Winona, Minnesota)

== Benton County ==
	Name on the Register	Image	Date listed	Location	City or town	Description
1	Church of Sts. Peter and Paul-Catholic	Church of Sts. Peter and Paul-Catholic	April 6, 1982 (#82002932)	State St. 45°44′11″N 93°56′43″W	Gilman	Landmark religious complex of a Polish American settlement, consisting of a 1909 parochial school, 1924 rectory, and 1930 Beaux-Arts church.
2	Cota Round Barns	Cota Round Barns	April 6, 1982 (#82002936)	County Highway 48; 45°34′44″N 93°57′01″W	St. George Township	Two round barns constructed in the early 1920s, prominent examples of the numerous reinforced concrete structures built in the area by contractor Al Cota and his successors from 1913 through the 1940s.
3	Esselman Brothers General Store	Esselman Brothers General Store	April 6, 1982 (#82002933)	County Highways 1 and 13; 45°42′48″N 94°06′38″W	Mayhew Lake Township	Well-preserved 1897 example of the general stores common to Benton County's crossroads communities, and a reminder of Mayhew Lake Township's settlement by German Americans.
4	Posch Site	Posch Site	October 2, 1973 (#73000964)	Address restricted	Langola Township	Archaeological site potentially dating back to the Archaic Period, having yielded a few stone tools but no ceramics.
5	Leonard Robinson House	Leonard Robinson House	April 6, 1982 (#82002935)	202 2nd Ave., S. 45°35′16″N 94°09′47″W	Sauk Rapids	1873 house of a pioneer in the area's significant granite quarrying industry.

=== Former listings ===
	Name on the Register	Image	Date listed	Date removed	Location	City or town	Description
1	Ronneby Charcoal Kiln		April 6, 1982 (#82002934)	January 15, 2003	Off Minnesota Highway 23	Ronneby vicinity	1901 charcoal kiln. Demolished in 2002.

== Clearwater County ==
	Name on the Register	Image	Date listed	Location	City or town	Description
1	Gran Evangelical Lutheran Church	Gran Evangelical Lutheran Church	May 19, 1988 (#88000593)	County Road 92 and County Highway 20; 47°32′36″N 95°29′05″W	Bagley vicinity	1897 log church—the first church in what became Clearwater County—which played a key role in the area's settlement by loggers and homesteaders and in the religious life of its Norwegian immigrants.
2	Itasca Bison Site	Itasca Bison Site	December 29, 1970 (#70000912)	Address restricted 47°11′39″N 95°13′51″W	Park Rapids vicinity	Site where Archaic hunters killed and butchered Bison occidentalis. Also a contributing property to Itasca State Park.
3	Itasca State Park	Itasca State Park	May 7, 1973 (#73000972)	21 mi (34 km) north of Park Rapids off U.S. Route 71; 47°11′38″N 95°13′03″W	Park Rapids vicinity	Minnesota's oldest state park, established in 1891. Also significant for its extensive archaeological resources, association with the quest for the Mississippi River headwaters, pioneer sites, and 72 park facilities built 1905–1942 noted for their rustic log construction and association with early park development. Extends into Becker and Hubbard Counties.
4	Lower Rice Lake Site	Lower Rice Lake Site	December 18, 1978 (#78001527)	Address restricted	Bagley vicinity	Woodland period site for wild rice harvesting, a subsistence activity unique to this region of North America. Also noted for an artifact assemblage suggesting ties to the north and the northern Great Plains.
5	Upper Rice Lake Site	Upper Rice Lake Site	December 19, 1978 (#78001526)	Address restricted	Shevlin vicinity	Woodland period site for wild rice harvesting, with artifacts associated with northern Minnesota, the northern plains, and the Mississippi basin, indicating broad migration and trade.

== Cottonwood County ==
	Name on the Register	Image	Date listed	Location	City or town	Description
1	Isaac Bargen House	Isaac Bargen House	June 13, 1986 (#86001285)	1215 Mountain Lake Rd. 43°56′06″N 94°55′29″W	Mountain Lake	1888 house of a transformational educator and administrator (1857–1943) who was one of the first in his Mennonite community to promote secular public education and government service.
2	Chicago, St. Paul, Minneapolis, and Omaha Depot	Chicago, St. Paul, Minneapolis, and Omaha Depot	June 13, 1986 (#86001286)	4th St. at 1st Ave. 44°02′23″N 95°26′07″W	Westbrook	1900 railway station, the last remaining on a branch line that opened the area up to development, and the essential link of commerce and communication for Westbrook and its surrounding farmers. Now a museum.
3	Cottonwood County Courthouse	Cottonwood County Courthouse	April 18, 1977 (#77000728)	900 3rd Ave. 43°51′58″N 95°07′01″W	Windom	Prominent 1904 courthouse noted for the neoclassicism expressed throughout the building, from the exterior architecture to the interior design and artwork.
4	Jeffers Petroglyphs Site	Jeffers Petroglyphs Site	October 15, 1970 (#70000291)	27160 County Rd. 2; 44°05′32″N 95°03′10″W	Jeffers vicinity	300-by-50-yard (274 by 46 m) rock outcrop bearing some 4,000 petroglyphs ranging from 7,000 to 250 years old, nominated as Minnesota's finest collection of precontact Native American rock art. Now a public site managed by the Minnesota Historical Society.
5	Mountain Lake Site	Mountain Lake Site	June 4, 1973 (#73000973)	Former island in the former Mountain Lake; 43°55′15″N 94°53′26″W	Mountain Lake vicinity	Deeply stratified village site spanning the precontact era from the late Archaic to an Oneota occupation, with a particular concentration of Woodland period ceramics.

== Freeborn County ==
	Name on the Register	Image	Date listed	Location	City or town	Description
1	Albert Lea City Hall	Albert Lea City Hall	May 17, 1984 (#84001412)	212 N. Broadway Ave. 43°39′03″N 93°22′06″W	Albert Lea	1903 municipal building that served as Albert Lea's seat of government until 1968. Also a contributing property to the Albert Lea Commercial Historic District.
2	Albert Lea Commercial Historic District	Albert Lea Commercial Historic District	July 16, 1987 (#87001214)	N. Broadway Ave. between Water and E. Main Sts. 43°38′54″N 93°22′07″W	Albert Lea	Three-block retail district whose buildings, constructed 1874–1928, are noted for their fine commercial architecture and multigenerational occupation by family businesses.
3	Chicago, Milwaukee, St. Paul and Pacific Railroad Depot	Chicago, Milwaukee, St. Paul and Pacific Railroad Depot	February 4, 1982 (#82002954)	606 S. Broadway Ave. 43°38′41″N 93°22′10″W	Albert Lea	1914 train station with a c.-1930 addition—emblematic of the rail connections that contributed to Albert Lea's growth and development.
4	Clarks Grove Cooperative Creamery	Clarks Grove Cooperative Creamery	March 20, 1986 (#86000480)	Main St. E. and Independence Ave. 43°45′49″N 93°19′44″W	Clarks Grove	Third home of Minnesota's first and most influential cooperative creamery, built in 1927 with a second-floor meeting hall. Also noted for its fine architecture and association with a successful Danish American dairying community.
5	Lodge Zare Zapadu No. 44	Lodge Zare Zapadu No. 44	March 20, 1986 (#86000479)	County Highway 30; 43°36′30″N 93°10′10″W	Hayward vicinity	1909 meeting hall of the Zapadni Ceska Bratrska Jednota fraternal society; the last of three halls that served as social and recreational centers for southeast Freeborn County's Czech American population.
6	H. A. Paine House	H. A. Paine House	March 20, 1986 (#86000481)	609 W. Fountain St. 43°39′05″N 93°22′33″W	Albert Lea	1898 Queen Anne house, called "a masterpiece and a perfect example" of the style in its nomination.
7	Dr. Albert C. Wedge House	Dr. Albert C. Wedge House	June 13, 1986 (#86001332)	216 W. Fountain St. 43°39′07″N 93°22′15″W	Albert Lea	Circa-1880 house noted for its exemplary Shingle style architecture and association with Albert C. Wedge (1834–1911), Albert Lea's leading doctor for over 50 years and an active figure in local and state affairs.

=== Former listings ===
	Name on the Register	Image	Date listed	Date removed	Location	City or town	Description
1	John Niebuhr Farmhouse		March 20, 1986 (#86000439)	June 22, 1998	Off County Highway 2	Conger vicinity	1873 farmhouse. Burned down in 1997.

== Grant County ==
	Name on the Register	Image	Date listed	Location	City or town	Description
1	Barrett Lakeside Pavilion	Barrett Lakeside Pavilion	April 30, 2026 (#100012949)	307 Lake St. 45°54′44″N 95°53′11″W	Barrett	1929 municipal pavilion and grounds; a well-preserved example of this once-common property type and an important venue for community events through the middle of the 20th century.
2	Fort Pomme de Terre Site	Fort Pomme de Terre Site	May 23, 1974 (#74001018)	Address restricted 46°04′01″N 95°52′57″W	Ashby vicinity	Site of an 1859 stagecoach station expanded into a U.S. Army fort for a few years after the Dakota War of 1862; a uniquely well-documented site from the earliest period of white settlement.
3	Grant County Courthouse	Grant County Courthouse	September 5, 1985 (#85001945)	10 2nd St. NE. 45°59′41″N 95°58′37″W	Elbow Lake	One of Minnesota's few monumental Victorian courthouses remaining, built in 1905; Grant County's most prominent turn-of-the-20th-century building and its long-serving seat of government, and an important work of architects Bell & Detweiler and interior designer Odin J. Oyen.
4	Immanuel Lutheran Church	Immanuel Lutheran Church	May 7, 2026 (#100012978)	18172 187th St. 45°53′14″N 95°55′42″W	Lien Township	1883 church and cemetery representing local Norwegian heritage and the distinctive architectural cues developed for Norwegian Lutheran churches in the U.S.
5	Roosevelt Hall	Roosevelt Hall	August 23, 1985 (#85001819)	Hawkins Ave. 45°54′39″N 95°53′19″W	Barrett	Municipal auditorium built 1933–34, one of Minnesota's few surviving projects by the short-lived Civil Works Administration, and an example of the refined but low-cost public buildings the New Deal brought to small Minnesota towns.
6	Anna J. Scofield Memorial Auditorium and Harold E. Thorson Memorial Library	Anna J. Scofield Memorial Auditorium and Harold E. Thorson Memorial Library	May 11, 2015 (#15000212)	117 Central Ave. N. 45°59′38″N 95°58′35″W	Elbow Lake	Dual-purpose municipal facility constructed 1933–34, the first building project in Minnesota funded by the Public Works Administration and one of the program's best works nationally, according to the agency in 1939.

== Hubbard County ==
	Name on the Register	Image	Date listed	Location	City or town	Description
1	Consolidated School District No. 22	Consolidated School District No. 22	January 24, 2017 (#100000565)	25895 County Rd. 9; 47°21′59″N 94°49′21″W	Nary	Two-story school built in 1918; a distinctive example of the larger facilities built to begin consolidating Minnesota's rural school districts. Also called Nary School; now the Helga Township Community Center.
2	Hubbard County Courthouse	Hubbard County Courthouse	March 8, 1984 (#84001475)	301 Court Ave. 46°55′12″N 95°03′50″W	Park Rapids	1900 Neoclassical courthouse, a prominent public building and home of the county government into the 1970s. Now houses the Hubbard County Historical Museum and Nemeth Art Center.
3	Itasca State Park	Itasca State Park	May 7, 1973 (#73000972)	36750 Main Park Dr. 47°11′38″N 95°13′03″W	Park Rapids vicinity	Minnesota's oldest state park, established in 1891. Also significant for its extensive archaeological resources, association with the quest for the Mississippi River headwaters, pioneer sites, and 72 park facilities built 1905–1942 noted for their rustic log construction and association with early park development. Extends into Becker and Clearwater Counties.
4	Louis J. Moser House	Louis J. Moser House	April 17, 1979 (#79001250)	28104 Junco Dr. 47°04′06″N 94°54′03″W	Thorpe Township	Circa-1907 homesteader's cabin used as one of Minnesota's first fishing resorts. Also noted for its locally unusual post and sill construction. Now the main office of Fremont's Point Resort.
5	Park Rapids Jail	Park Rapids Jail	October 27, 1988 (#88002053)	205 W. 2nd St. 46°55′16″N 95°03′38″W	Park Rapids	1901 jail, the only largely intact municipal building from Park Rapid's early boom years.
6	Shell River Prehistoric Village and Mound District	Shell River Prehistoric Village and Mound District	June 19, 1973 (#73000980)	Address restricted	Park Rapids vicinity	Large habitation and mound complex at the junction of two major river routes, likely harboring a deep Woodland period stratigraphy at the far northern boundary of Mississippian culture influence.

=== Former listing ===
	Name on the Register	Image	Date listed	Date removed	Location	City or town	Description
1	Hubbard Lodge No. 130		March 10, 1988 (#88000194)	April 27, 1993	Off County Highway 6	Hubbard Township	1899 Independent Order of Odd Fellows hall. Restored in 1989 but destroyed by arson on February 14, 1991.

== Jackson County ==
	Name on the Register	Image	Date listed	Location	City or town	Description
1	Church of the Sacred Heart (Catholic)	Church of the Sacred Heart (Catholic)	March 20, 1989 (#89000157)	9th St. and 4th Ave. 43°47′41″N 95°19′02″W	Heron Lake	Southwest Minnesota's largest and most elaborately appointed early-20th-century church, built 1920–21 with Neoclassical and Baroque Revival influences.
2	District No. 92 School	District No. 92 School	October 27, 1988 (#88002082)	County Highway 9; 43°33′59″N 95°02′07″W	Jackson	Unusual octagonal schoolhouse built in 1906, one of only two surviving examples in Minnesota inspired by the octagon house concept promoted by Orson Squire Fowler.
3	Jackson Commercial Historic District	Jackson Commercial Historic District	December 17, 1987 (#87002155)	2nd St. between Sheridan and White Sts. 43°37′18″N 94°59′16″W	Jackson	Cohesive commercial district charting the small businesses that composed a late-19th/early-20th-century railroad-based trade center. 31 contributing properties built 1880–1928 include seven associated with influential local businessman Frank A. Matuska (1872–1947).
4	Jackson County Courthouse	Jackson County Courthouse	April 13, 1977 (#77000747)	413 4th St. 43°37′16″N 94°59′25″W	Jackson	1908 courthouse, longstanding government seat and local landmark distinguished by the Neoclassical architecture and art that carry through from exterior to interior.
5	George M. Moore Farmstead	George M. Moore Farmstead	January 7, 1987 (#86003604)	Off County Highway 4; 43°30′53″N 95°04′45″W	Jackson	Farmstead also known as Moorland featuring Jackson County's most architecturally sophisticated farmhouse and two other American Craftsman buildings, all constructed in 1917.
6	Robertson Park Site	Robertson Park Site	August 1, 1980 (#80002082)	Address restricted	Jackson	Habitation site occupied c. 100 BCE–800 CE.

=== Former listings ===
	Name on the Register	Image	Date listed	Date removed	Location	City or town	Description
1	Heron Lake Public School		August 15, 1985 (#85001769)	May 15, 1987	Sixth Ave. and Tenth St.	Heron Lake	1896 Romanesque Revival school. Closed in 1982 and demolished in 1986.
2	Winter Hotel		September 30, 1988 (#88002081)	February 13, 1991	111 Main St.	Lakefield	1895 hotel. Demolished in 1990.

== Kanabec County ==
	Name on the Register	Image	Date listed	Location	City or town	Description
1	Ann River Logging Company Farm	Ann River Logging Company Farm	August 18, 1980 (#80002085)	1884 Minnesota Highway 23; 45°51′16″N 93°19′55″W	Mora vicinity	One of Kanabec County's earliest and largest farmsteads, established in 1880 to support a logging operation (the era's leading local industry) as a headquarters, food and feed producer, and stable for work animals.
2	Coin School	Coin School	September 30, 2025 (#100012053)	805 Forest Ave. W. 45°52′26″N 93°18′29″W	Mora	School built in 1899, expanded in 1911, and in use until 1970; a well-preserved and latest-serving example of Kanabec County's frame country schools. Previously listed in 1980 as #80002086; relisted due its move to the Kanabec History Center.
3	Kanabec County Courthouse	Kanabec County Courthouse	April 11, 1977 (#77000748)	18 N. Vine St. 45°52′39″N 93°17′36″W	Mora	1894 courthouse with two 20th-century additions, the long-serving seat of county government. Also noted for its unusually restrained Romanesque Revival architecture.
4	Knife Lake Prehistoric District	Knife Lake Prehistoric District	January 21, 1974 (#74001028)	Address restricted	Mora vicinity	District of Native American village, mound, and wild ricing sites spanning from 200 BCE to the 19th century.
5	Ogilvie Watertower	Ogilvie Watertower	August 18, 1980 (#80002087)	Anderson St. 45°49′52″N 93°25′41″W	Ogilvie	Rare surviving example of Minnesota's earliest reinforced-concrete watertowers—built in 1918—and a symbol of the local infrastructure improvements that enabled the organization of Ogilvie's fire department.
6	C. E. Williams House	C. E. Williams House	August 18, 1980 (#80002083)	206 E. Maple Ave. 45°52′41″N 93°17′43″W	Mora	1902 Queen Anne house, significant as one of Kanabec County's most distinctive residences and for its 1909–1951 occupancy by local civic leader C. E. Williams.

=== Former listings ===
	Name on the Register	Image	Date listed	Date removed	Location	City or town	Description
1	Zetterberg Company	Zetterberg Company	August 18, 1980 (#80002084)	March 28, 2024	630 E. Forest St. 45°52′34″N 93°17′18″W	Mora	Railside farm machinery dealership built in 1912, reflecting the region's shift from logging to agriculture and the railroads' influence on town development. Demolished in 2014.

== Kittson County ==
	Name on the Register	Image	Date listed	Location	City or town	Description
1	Lake Bronson Site	Lake Bronson Site	May 22, 1978 (#78001549)	Southern side of County Road 10 at Lake Bronson; 48°43′00″N 96°37′27″W	Lake Bronson vicinity	Middle Woodland period burial mounds and the site of a Middle/Late Woodland seasonal bison-hunting village.
2	Lake Bronson State Park WPA/Rustic Style Historic Resources	Lake Bronson State Park WPA/Rustic Style Historic Resources	October 25, 1989 (#89001659)	Off County Highway 28 east of Lake Bronson; 48°43′24″N 96°37′22″W	Lake Bronson vicinity	Park developments significant as examples of New Deal federal work relief, strategic placement of state recreational facilities, and National Park Service rustic design, with 12 contributing properties built 1936–1940, including a unique observation/water tower and a dam engineered over quicksand.
3	St. Nicholas Orthodox Church	St. Nicholas Orthodox Church	March 8, 1984 (#84001480)	County Highway 4; 48°58′57″N 96°27′06″W	Caribou Township	1905 church associated with Ukrainian immigrant settlement in northwestern Minnesota.
4	Teien Central School	Teien Central School	December 18, 2025 (#100012386)	1395 160th Ave. 48°36′06″N 97°06′22″W	Teien Township	1904 building representing rural education and local governance, serving as an elementary school 1904–1954 and town hall 1954–1998. Listing includes a water pump and swing set.
5	U.S. Inspection Station-Noyes, Minnesota	U.S. Inspection Station-Noyes, Minnesota	May 22, 2014 (#14000257)	U.S. Route 75; 49°00′00″N 97°12′25″W	Noyes	1931 Colonial Revival customs and immigration station, a well-preserved example of the nation's first purpose-built border checkpoints at land crossings.

== Lake of the Woods County ==
	Name on the Register	Image	Date listed	Location	City or town	Description
1	Canadian National Railways Depot	Canadian National Railways Depot	August 7, 2005 (#05000809)	420 N. Main Ave. 48°42′58″N 94°36′00″W	Baudette	1923 train station owned by the Canadian National Railway but also housing U.S. federal border agencies; a symbol of international cooperation and the chief conduit for Baudette's growth and development.
2	Fort St. Charles Archeological Site	Fort St. Charles Archeological Site	April 8, 1983 (#83000911)	Magnusons Island; 49°21′42″N 94°58′51″W	Angle Inlet vicinity	Site of a French outpost active 1732 to the mid-1750s, a key vestige of European exploration and colonialism. A reconstruction was built nearby in the 1950s.
3	Norris Camp	Norris Camp	September 19, 1994 (#94001080)	Off Norris-Roosevelt Forest Rd. in the Red Lake Wildlife Management Area; 48°36′37″N 95°10′55″W	Roosevelt vicinity	Rare surviving Civilian Conservation Corps work camp with 14 remaining buildings constructed 1935–36, then used 1936–42 as the headquarters for Minnesota's largest Resettlement Administration project, which relocated settlers from inadequate farmland and restored it for resource extraction and recreation.
4	Northwest Point	Northwest Point	February 23, 1973 (#73000982)	Between Bear and Harrison Creeks; 49°22′31″N 95°09′00″W	Angle Inlet vicinity	Remote wedge of land from which the Canada–United States border was drawn to satisfy the Treaty of 1818—creating the distinctive Northwest Angle exclave—but mistakenly used by Canadian commercial interests until 1874.

=== Former listing ===
	Name on the Register	Image	Date listed	Date removed	Location	City or town	Description
1	Spooner Public School		February 11, 1983 (#83000913)	July 1, 2002	1st St., N	Baudette	1909 brick school. Demolished in 2001.

== Lincoln County ==
	Name on the Register	Image	Date listed	Location	City or town	Description
1	Danebod	Danebod	June 30, 1975 (#75000993)	Danebod Court; 44°16′05″N 96°08′01″W	Tyler	1889 meeting hall, 1895 church, 1904 gymnasium, and 1917 folk school central to Minnesota's first Danish immigrant settlement, founded in 1884.
2	Drammen Farmers' Club	Drammen Farmers' Club	December 1, 1980 (#80004539)	County Highway 13; 44°19′40″N 96°22′58″W	Drammen Township	Long-serving 1921 meeting hall, atypically built by a purely social (rather than religious or political) club to host events for a sparsely populated agricultural community.
3	Lake Benton Opera House and Kimball Building	Lake Benton Opera House and Kimball Building	March 25, 1977 (#77000753)	Benton Street between Fremont and Center Streets; 44°15′39″N 96°17′10″W	Lake Benton	1896 opera house that hosted numerous community events and was restored to its original use in 1970. Boundary expanded in 1982 (#82002979) to include the adjacent commercial building constructed at the same time.
4	Lincoln County Courthouse and Jail	Lincoln County Courthouse and Jail	December 1, 1980 (#80004541)	319 North Rebecca Street; 44°27′46″N 96°15′08″W	Ivanhoe	1904 jail and 1919 courthouse, prominent public buildings and longtime seat of county government; further associated with the effects of railroad placement in determining Lincoln County's most viable communities.
5	Lincoln County Fairgrounds	Lincoln County Fairgrounds	December 12, 1980 (#80002088)	Strong and Marsh Streets; 44°16′56″N 96°08′14″W	Tyler	Unusually intact fairground with 18 contributing properties built 1921–1945, representative of Lincoln County's agriculture and strong county fair tradition.
6	Ernst Osbeck House	Ernst Osbeck House	December 2, 1980 (#80004540)	106 South Fremont Street; 44°15′37″N 96°17′10″W	Lake Benton	One of Lake Benton's most prominent houses, built in 1887 for Ernest Osbeck (b. 1859), a prosperous grocery merchant who helped found numerous local endeavors.
7	Tyler Public School	Tyler Public School	December 1, 1980 (#80002089)	Strong Street; 44°16′54″N 96°08′02″W	Tyler	Distinctive public school noted for its well-preserved Renaissance/Romanesque Revival original section, built in 1903. Demolished in January 2022.

== Mahnomen County ==
	Name on the Register	Image	Date listed	Location	City or town	Description
1	Mahnomen City Hall	Mahnomen City Hall	December 22, 1988 (#88003011)	104 West Madison Avenue; 47°18′51″N 95°58′09″W	Mahnomen	Distinctive 1937 municipal building with an asymmetrical design, cut fieldstone façade, and sympathetic 1948 addition, emblematic of the Depression-era infrastructure sponsored by the Works Progress Administration.
2	Mahnomen County Courthouse	Mahnomen County Courthouse	February 16, 1984 (#84001488)	311 North Main Street; 47°19′04″N 95°58′09″W	Mahnomen	1909 courthouse expanded in 1977, noted for its simple Neoclassical architecture and long service as the seat of an unusual county established entirely within a Native American reservation.
3	Mahnomen County Fairgrounds Historic District	Mahnomen County Fairgrounds Historic District	March 2, 1989 (#89000077)	Junction of Minnesota Highway 200 and County Highway 137; 47°19′20″N 95°58′39″W	Mahnomen vicinity	Fairground with eight contributing properties built 1936–38, representative of the importance of the county fair in rural Minnesota culture and the enduring output of the Works Progress Administration.

== Marshall County ==
	Name on the Register	Image	Date listed	Location	City or town	Description
1	Larson Mill	Larson Mill	June 4, 1973 (#73000983)	County Road 39 in Old Mill State Park; 48°22′00″N 96°34′03″W	Argyle vicinity	One of western Minnesota's best surviving early gristmills, built in 1889 and restored to operating capacity with its original 1878 steam engine.
2	Old Mill State Park WPA/Rustic Style Historic Resources	Old Mill State Park WPA/Rustic Style Historic Resources	October 25, 1989 (#89001667)	Off County Highway 39 east of Argyle; 48°21′45″N 96°34′12″W	Argyle vicinity	Eight park facilities built 1937–41, significant as examples of New Deal federal work relief, early Minnesota state park development, NPS Rustic split-stone architecture, and environmentally sensitive master planning.
3	K. J. Taralseth Company	K. J. Taralseth Company	September 6, 2002 (#02000938)	427 North Main Street; 48°11′47″N 96°46′24″W	Warren	1911 commercial building that housed a major local retailer active 1888–1959, various offices, and a Masonic Temple that was a key venue for social events.

== McLeod County ==
	Name on the Register	Image	Date listed	Location	City or town	Description
1	Glencoe Grade and High School	Glencoe Grade and High School	October 17, 2012 (#12000872)	1107 11th St. E. 44°46′14″N 94°08′52″W	Glencoe	1933 brick school, Glencoe's sole public education facility for kindergarten through high school until 1954. Also housed community services and events.
2	Merton S. Goodnow House	Merton S. Goodnow House	August 15, 1985 (#85001771)	446 S. Main St. 44°53′13″N 94°22′11″W	Hutchinson	1913 Prairie School house designed by Purcell & Elmslie, a fine example of the architectural firm's work, which was typified in its early years by modest residences for small lots.
3	Hutchinson Carnegie Library	Hutchinson Carnegie Library	December 12, 1977 (#77001507)	50 Hassan St. SE; 44°53′30″N 94°22′05″W	Hutchinson	1904 Carnegie library noted for its Neoclassical architecture and role in the intellectual and cultural life of Hutchinson.
4	Komensky School	Komensky School	August 20, 2009 (#09000622)	19981 Major Ave. 44°54′24″N 94°16′37″W	Hutchinson vicinity	School active 1912–1959, serving as the focal point of a rural Czech American community.
5	McLeod County Courthouse	McLeod County Courthouse	August 23, 1984 (#84001620)	830 11th St. E. 44°46′11″N 94°09′02″W	Glencoe	Long-serving government seat, dating to 1876; extensively enlarged and remodeled in 1909 to become McLeod County's leading example of Beaux-Arts architecture.
6	Harry Merrill House	Harry Merrill House	August 1, 2012 (#12000460)	225 Washington St. W. 44°53′34″N 94°22′23″W	Hutchinson	House occupied 1886–1932 by local education leader Harry Merrill, superintendent of Hutchinson public schools for 33 years.
7	Winsted City Hall	Winsted City Hall	August 19, 1982 (#82002988)	181 1st St. N. 44°57′54″N 94°02′48″W	Winsted	Well-preserved example of a late-19th-century Queen Anne municipal building—constructed in 1895—and the long-serving seat of local government.

=== Former listings ===
	Name on the Register	Image	Date listed	Date removed	Location	City or town	Description
1	American House Hotel		August 23, 1984 (#84001492)	May 7, 1990	12th and Ford Sts.	Glencoe	1881 hotel built to serve railroad travelers and salesmen. Demolished by owner in 1988.
2	Maplewood Academy		March 31, 1978 (#78003073)	March 19, 1984	700 N. Main St.	Hutchinson	Also known as Ansgar College. Architecturally eclectic 1902 academic hall occupied by a succession of educational institutions. Deemed uneconomical to renovate and demolished in 1980.

== Norman County ==
	Name on the Register	Image	Date listed	Location	City or town	Description
1	Ada Village Hall	Ada Village Hall	February 26, 1998 (#98000154)	404 W. Main St. 47°18′00″N 96°31′00″W	Ada	1904 example of the multipurpose municipal halls common in turn-of-the-20th-century Minnesota, serving as Ada's seat of government and primary event venue for nearly the next hundred years.
2	Canning Site (21NR9)	Canning Site (21NR9)	June 19, 1986 (#86001358)	Address Restricted	Hendrum vicinity	c. 1500 BCE seasonal bison-processing camp.
3	Congregational Church of Ada	Congregational Church of Ada	November 8, 1984 (#84000236)	E. 2nd Ave. and 1st St. 47°17′54″N 96°30′44″W	Ada	1900 church noted for its regionally unusual American Craftsman architecture and illustration of the ties between some of Ada's early settlers and congregational churches in New England.
4	Norman County Courthouse	Norman County Courthouse	May 9, 1983 (#83000923)	16 E. 3rd Ave. 47°17′54″N 96°30′49″W	Ada	1904 courthouse noted for its fine Romanesque Revival architecture and role as the long-serving seat of Norman County government.
5	Zion Lutheran Church	Zion Lutheran Church	October 21, 1999 (#99001269)	County Highway 3; 47°27′20″N 96°47′28″W	Shelly vicinity	1883 church and cemetery, representing the area's initial Norwegian American settlers and the maintenance of their ethnic identity through church-sponsored activities.

=== Former listings ===
	Name on the Register	Image	Date listed	Date removed	Location	City or town	Description
1	Faith Milling Company		January 31, 1978 (#78001553)	May 7, 1990	CR 40	Twin Valley vicinity	1916 water-powered flour mill. Continued to operate until August 13, 1989, when it was struck by lightning and burned down.

== Pennington County ==
	Name on the Register	Image	Date listed	Location	City or town	Description
1	Minneapolis, St. Paul and Sault Ste. Marie Depot	Minneapolis, St. Paul and Sault Ste. Marie Depot	July 14, 1995 (#95000852)	405 3rd St. E. 48°07′10″N 96°10′34″W	Thief River Falls	Distinctive 1914 American Craftsman train station associated with the development of the rail network and agriculture in northwestern Minnesota and South Dakota. Listing includes a 1912 2-8-2 steam locomotive.
2	Thief River Falls Auditorium and Municipal Building	Thief River Falls Auditorium and Municipal Building	May 29, 2020 (#100005247)	123 Main Ave. N. 48°07′04″N 96°10′55″W	Thief River Falls	1933 multipurpose municipal hall with a public auditorium; a key venue of government, civic, and recreational activity in Thief River Falls for much of the 20th century. Also noted for its locally distinctive Moderne architecture.
3	Red River Trail: Goose Lake Swamp Section		February 6, 1991 (#90002202)	Off County Highway 10 south of Goose Lake Swamp; 47°58′24″N 96°28′23″W	Polk Centre Township	Unimproved one-mile fragment of the Woods Trail route in use circa 1844–1871; Minnesota's best preserved segment of the Red River Trails.
4	Thief River Falls Public Library	Thief River Falls Public Library	October 6, 1983 (#83003763)	102 N. Main Ave. 48°07′02″N 96°10′52″W	Thief River Falls	Well-preserved example of Minnesota's Carnegie libraries, built in 1914 with fine craftsmanship by local firms.

== Polk County ==
	Name on the Register	Image	Date listed	Location	City or town	Description
1	Cathedral of the Immaculate Conception	Cathedral of the Immaculate Conception	October 1, 1998 (#98001219)	N. Ash St. at 2nd Ave. 47°46′27″N 96°36′15″W	Crookston	1912 cathedral that served as the religious and administrative center of the 14-county Diocese of Crookston until 1953.
2	Church of St. Peter-Catholic	Church of St. Peter-Catholic	August 19, 1982 (#82002994)	25823 185th Ave. SW; 47°47′32″N 96°26′54″W	Gentilly Township	Exemplary Gothic Revival church completed in 1915 and its 1902 rectory, anchors of a Catholic French Canadian settlement.
3	Crookston Carnegie Public Library	Crookston Carnegie Public Library	May 10, 1984 (#84001646)	120 N. Ash St. 47°46′25″N 96°36′18″W	Crookston	Well preserved Carnegie library built 1907–08, noted for its Neoclassical design by local architect Bert Keck.
4	Crookston Commercial Historic District	Crookston Commercial Historic District	November 23, 1984 (#84002709)	Roughly Main St. and Broadway between Fletcher and W. 2nd St. 47°46′27″N 96°36′27″W	Crookston	Largest and most intact late-19th/early-20th-century commercial district in Minnesota's Red River Valley, with 39 contributing properties mostly built 1882–1920s.
5	E. C. Davis House	E. C. Davis House	May 10, 1984 (#84001648)	406 Grant St. 47°46′58″N 96°36′20″W	Crookston	Distinctive Italianate house built 1879–80 for a railroad contractor who became one of Crookston's first settlers and leading politicians.
6	Hamm Brewing Company Beer Depot	Hamm Brewing Company Beer Depot	September 20, 1984 (#84001651)	401 DeMers Ave. 47°55′49″N 97°01′29″W	East Grand Forks	1907 warehouse established by the Saint Paul-based Hamm's Brewery, a rare extant symbol of a Minnesota brewery's regional expansion.

== Red Lake County ==
	Name on the Register	Image	Date listed	Location	City or town	Description
1	Clearwater Evangelical Lutheran Church	Clearwater Evangelical Lutheran Church	November 18, 1999 (#99001386)	County Highway 10; 47°55′41″N 95°46′27″W	Oklee vicinity	1912 church and adjacent cemetery, the last surviving example built by the area's Norwegian settlers and a key venue for preserving their ethnic heritage.
2	Red Lake County Courthouse	Red Lake County Courthouse	May 9, 1983 (#83000941)	124 Langevin; 47°53′06″N 96°16′27″W	Red Lake Falls	1910 courthouse noted for its central role in county affairs and the prominence of its hilltop Beaux-Arts design.

== Renville County ==
	Name on the Register	Image	Date listed	Location	City or town	Description
1	Birch Coulee	Birch Coulee	June 4, 1973 (#73000995)	Off County Highways 2 and 18; 44°34′34″N 94°58′35″W	Morton vicinity	Site of the thirty-hour Battle of Birch Coulee on September 2–3, 1862; the deadliest defeat of U.S. military forces during the Dakota War of 1862. Now a Renville County park with interpretive markers.
2	Joseph Brown House Ruins	Joseph Brown House Ruins	August 3, 1986 (#86002838)	County Road 15; 44°41′47″N 95°19′22″W	Sacred Heart vicinity	Ruins of the 1861 house of influential Minnesota settler Joseph R. Brown (1805–1870). Also associated with native–white relations, white settlement and reservation establishment on the upper Minnesota River, and the outbreak of the Dakota War of 1862. Now the Joseph R. Brown State Wayside.
3	Heins Block	Heins Block	August 8, 2001 (#01000842)	102-104 N. 9th St. 44°46′36″N 94°59′23″W	Olivia	Prominent 1896 mixed-use building that provided key commercial, office, residential, and meeting space throughout Olivia's development.
4	Hotel Sacred Heart	Hotel Sacred Heart	May 23, 2016 (#16000279)	112 W. Maple St. 44°47′13″N 95°21′03″W	Sacred Heart	1914 hotel and restaurant, a prominent small-town venue offering lodging for rail-based business travelers as well as early automotive tourists on the Yellowstone Trail, plus a banquet hall for local events.
5	Minneapolis and St. Louis Depot	Minneapolis and St. Louis Depot	July 24, 1986 (#86001921)	Park St. and 2nd Ave., S. 44°31′35″N 94°43′12″W	Fairfax	Renville County's oldest and most intact railway station on its original site, built c. 1883. Also significant as a symbol of the local importance of railroads and as a regional example of a 19th-century frame passenger/freight depot.
6	Renville County Courthouse and Jail	Renville County Courthouse and Jail	June 13, 1986 (#86001281)	500 E. DePue Ave. 44°46′34″N 94°59′00″W	Olivia	Ornate 1902 courthouse designed by Fremont D. Orff, noted for its architectural significance and—with the adjacent 1904 jail—as the outcome of a particularly involved four-way, 28-year battle for county seat status.
7	Lars Rudi House	Lars Rudi House	July 24, 1986 (#86001924)	County Road 15; 44°40′20″N 95°17′37″W	Sacred Heart vicinity	1868 cabin of prominent local pioneer Lars Rudi (1827–1913). Also Renville County's leading example of a log house, dating to the resumption of settlement after the Dakota War of 1862.
8	Sacred Heart Public School	Sacred Heart Public School	October 20, 2014 (#14000869)	100 Elm St. 44°47′00″N 95°21′02″W	Sacred Heart	1901 school with several additions, reflecting the 20th-century growth and educational expansion of small-town public schools. 1929 auditorium/gymnasium also noted as Sacred Heart's primary venue for public functions. Demolished in 2023.
9	Tinnes–Baker House	Tinnes–Baker House	April 26, 2021 (#100006437)	801 Highway Ave. 44°46′02″N 94°53′48″W	Bird Island	Leading local example of an American Craftsman bungalow, built in 1910.

== Roseau County ==
	Name on the Register	Image	Date listed	Location	City or town	Description
1	Canadian National Depot	Canadian National Depot	April 6, 1982 (#82003034)	121 Main Ave. NE. 48°54′23″N 95°19′06″W	Warroad	1914 station of the Canadian National Railway on U.S. soil, used by many emigrants leaving for Canada.
2	Lodge Boleslav Jablonsky No. 219		September 6, 2002 (#02000936)	30033 110th St. 48°33′20″N 95°56′58″W	Poplar Grove Township	1916 clubhouse of a Czech American fraternal organization, representative of ethnic history in the last part of Minnesota to be settled by Euro-Americans.
3	Roseau County Courthouse	Roseau County Courthouse	August 15, 1985 (#85001763)	216 Center St. W. 48°50′45″N 95°45′56″W	Roseau	1913 courthouse symbolic of Roseau County's governmental development.
4	Roseau Memorial Arena		November 5, 2024 (#100011014)	321 2nd Ave. NW; 48°50′56″N 95°45′52″W	Roseau	1949 ice hockey arena expanded in 1955; a long-serving center of community activity and identity.

== Sherburne County ==
	Name on the Register	Image	Date listed	Location	City or town	Description
1	Elk River Water Tower	Elk River Water Tower	May 23, 2012 (#12000284)	Jackson Ave. & 4th St. NW; 45°18′22″N 93°33′59″W	Elk River	1920 water tower prompted by a need for firefighting infrastructure, noted for its impact on community development and as a representative of a once-common but vanishing design.
2	Elkhi Stadium	Elkhi Stadium	May 26, 2004 (#04000540)	1133 4th St. NW; 45°18′17″N 93°34′31″W	Elk River	School/city athletic field begun with community labor in 1922 and improved by the National Youth Administration in 1940. Also known as Handke Stadium.
3	Herbert M. Fox House	Herbert M. Fox House	April 10, 1980 (#80002175)	10775 27th Ave. SE; 45°24′56″N 93°53′21″W	Becker	1876 pioneer farmhouse, uniquely constructed of load-bearing vertical planks rather than wall studs. Moved in 2006 to the grounds of the Sherburne History Center.
4	Oliver H. Kelley Homestead	Oliver H. Kelley Homestead	October 15, 1966 (#66000406)	15788 Kelley Farm Rd. 45°15′27″N 93°32′16″W	Elk River	Farm occupied 1850–1870 by Oliver H. Kelley, founder of The National Grange of the Order of Patrons of Husbandry. Now a Minnesota Historical Society living history site.
5	Minnesota State Reformatory for Men Historic District	Minnesota State Reformatory for Men Historic District	July 17, 1986 (#86001671)	2305 Minnesota Blvd. SE; 45°32′35″N 94°07′00″W	St. Cloud	Prison complex of 23 contributing properties built 1887–1933 with granite quarried by inmates; noted for its architectural cohesion and association with penal reform and Minnesota's quarrying industry.

=== Former listing ===
	Name on the Register	Image	Date listed	Date removed	Location	City or town	Description
1	Sherburne County Courthouse	Sherburne County Courthouse	January 23, 1986 (#86000120)	October 6, 1995	326 Lowell Avenue	Elk River	County courthouse in service 1877–1980. Demolished by the county in 1995 for real estate sale.

== Sibley County ==
	Name on the Register	Image	Date listed	Location	City or town	Description
1	Church of St. Thomas	Church of St. Thomas	September 16, 1991 (#88003085)	31624 Scenic Byway Rd. 44°35′56″N 93°54′01″W	Jessenland Township	1870 church, 1878 rectory, and cemetery of Minnesota's first Irish American farming settlement, established in 1852.
2	Gaylord City Park	Gaylord City Park	February 6, 2012 (#11001085)	Veterans Dr. & Park St. 44°33′38″N 94°13′17″W	Gaylord	City park established in 1897, a longtime recreational venue featuring a 1916 pavilion, 1940 bandshell, and a 1940 bridge built by the Works Progress Administration.
3	Gibbon Village Hall	Gibbon Village Hall	August 19, 1982 (#82003036)	First Ave. and 12th St. 44°32′04″N 94°31′35″W	Gibbon	Unusual 1895 municipal hall with medieval-themed Romanesque Revival architecture.
4	Henderson Commercial Historic District	Henderson Commercial Historic District	December 20, 1988 (#88002834)	Roughly Main St. between 5th and 6th Sts. 44°31′42″N 93°54′25″W	Henderson	Well-preserved commercial center of an early river town and original county seat, with 12 contributing properties built 1874–circa-1905.
5	August F. Poehler House	August F. Poehler House	February 4, 1982 (#82003037)	700 Main St. 44°31′41″N 93°54′38″W	Henderson	1884 Queen Anne house of an influential local settler and businessman. Now houses the Sibley County Historical Society Museum.
6	Sibley County Courthouse and Sheriff's Residence and Jail	Sibley County Courthouse and Sheriff's Residence and Jail	December 29, 1988 (#88003071)	400 Court St. and 319 Park Ave. 44°33′22″N 94°13′14″W	Gaylord	1916 Neoclassical and Spanish Colonial Revival public buildings reflective of Gaylord's growth leading to and continuing after achieving county seat status in 1915.
7	Sibley County Courthouse-1879	Sibley County Courthouse-1879	July 2, 1979 (#79001255)	600 Main St. 44°31′42″N 93°54′33″W	Henderson	Sibley County's first purpose-built courthouse, in use 1879–1915 and embodying the era's fashion for Italianate public buildings. Now the Henderson Community Building.

== Stevens County ==
	Name on the Register	Image	Date listed	Location	City or town	Description
1	Alberta Teachers House	Alberta Teachers House	February 11, 1983 (#83000942)	Main St. 45°34′33″N 96°02′54″W	Alberta	1917 faculty housing associated with a key period of modernization in Minnesota's rural education system.
2	Morris Carnegie Library	Morris Carnegie Library	January 27, 1983 (#83000943)	116 W. 6th St. 45°35′09″N 95°55′04″W	Morris	Well preserved and locally distinctive 1905 Carnegie library, a longstanding focus of education in Morris. Now the Stevens County Historical Society Museum.
3	Morris High School	Morris High School	May 25, 2004 (#04000532)	600 Columbia Ave. 45°35′25″N 95°54′29″W	Morris	Building and grounds of a public school established in 1914 and expanded twice by 1950, reflecting the development and growth of public schools in Minnesota towns. Demolished in 2013 after no viable reuse plan could be found.
4	Morris Industrial School for Indians Dormitory	Morris Industrial School for Indians Dormitory	May 10, 1984 (#84001696)	Off 4th St. 45°35′21″N 95°54′05″W	Morris	1899 dormitory, sole remaining campus building of a Native American boarding school active 1887–1909. Also a contributing property to the West Central School of Agriculture and Experiment Station Historic District. Now the University of Minnesota Morris's Multi-Ethnic Resource Center.
5	Lewis H. Stanton House	Lewis H. Stanton House	August 19, 1982 (#82003060)	907 Park St. 45°35′15″N 95°55′26″W	Morris	1881 house nicknamed "The Chimneys", noted for its Stick–Eastlake architecture and prominence among the housing stock of Morris.
6	West Central School of Agriculture and Experiment Station Historic District	West Central School of Agriculture and Experiment Station Historic District	January 15, 2003 (#02001707)	600 E. 4th St. 45°35′25″N 95°54′00″W	Morris	One of the country's longest-running and most intact residential agricultural high schools, operated 1910–1963 by the University of Minnesota's nationally influential agricultural education system. The 11 contributing properties built 1899–1929 are now part of the University of Minnesota Morris campus.

== Traverse County ==
	Name on the Register	Image	Date listed	Location	City or town	Description
1	Browns Valley Carnegie Public Library	Browns Valley Carnegie Public Library	August 15, 1985 (#85001762)	Broadway Ave. and 2nd St. 45°35′42″N 96°49′51″W	Browns Valley	Carnegie library built 1915–16, Browns Valley's most architecturally significant early-20th-century building and an example of the libraries provided to small Minnesota communities by Andrew Carnegie's philanthropy.
2	Chicago, Milwaukee and St. Paul Depot	Chicago, Milwaukee and St. Paul Depot	August 23, 1985 (#85001818)	1201 Broadway Ave. 45°48′17″N 96°30′01″W	Wheaton	Circa-1906 railway station, a well-preserved example of its type and a symbol of the importance of the railroad to Wheaton. Now houses the Traverse County Historical Society Museum.
3	District No. 44 School	District No. 44 School	July 20, 2011 (#11000470)	U.S. Route 75; 46°00′02″N 96°29′35″W	Taylor Township	Well-preserved example—active 1891–1954—of the one-room schoolhouses once common in rural Traverse County.
4	Fort Wadsworth Agency and Scout Headquarters Building	Fort Wadsworth Agency and Scout Headquarters Building	July 17, 1986 (#86001672)	796 W. Broadway Ave. 45°35′45″N 96°50′27″W	Browns Valley	Only surviving log building of Fort Wadsworth, built in 1864; later a residence of Indian agent Joseph R. Brown and his son Sam Brown. Also a rare example of post-and-plank construction. Now preserved in Sam Brown Memorial State Wayside.
5	Larson's Hunters Resort	Larson's Hunters Resort	August 15, 1985 (#85001774)	County Highway 76; 45°49′29″N 96°34′21″W	Wheaton vicinity	Hunting resort complex with a prominent 1901 lodge/house, associated with western Minnesota's recreational hunting industry and the phenomenon of farmer/resort owners.

== Wadena County ==
	Name on the Register	Image	Date listed	Location	City or town	Description
1	Blueberry Lake Village Site	Blueberry Lake Village Site	October 2, 1973 (#73000996)	Address restricted	Menahga vicinity	One of the few surviving precontact archaeological sites in the Shell River basin of northwestern Wadena County, the region's most conducive zone for prehistoric human habitation.
2	Commercial Hotel	Commercial Hotel	December 22, 1988 (#88003010)	218 Jefferson St., S. 46°26′22″N 95°08′15″W	Wadena	Circa-1885 hotel exemplifying the lodging facilities built in anticipation of Wadena's late-19th-century commercial growth.
3	Northern Pacific Passenger Depot	Northern Pacific Passenger Depot	January 3, 1989 (#88003012)	100 SW. Aldrich Ave. 46°26′31″N 95°08′17″W	Wadena	1915 railway station symbolizing the impact of the Northern Pacific Railway on Wadena's establishment and development. Now a museum and event venue.
4	Old Wadena Historic District	Old Wadena Historic District	October 9, 1973 (#73000997)	Old Wadena County Park; 46°25′18″N 94°49′47″W	Staples vicinity	Seminal site of Euro-American activity in Wadena County, from three successive trading posts established in 1782, 1792, and 1825, to a town founded in 1856 and the county's first farm. Now a county park.
5	Reaume's Trading Post	Reaume's Trading Post	December 24, 1974 (#74001042)	Address restricted	Wadena vicinity	Site of a trading post established in 1792, significant for its role in and research potential on the opening of the fur trade in north-central Minnesota.
6	Wadena Fire and City Hall	Wadena Fire and City Hall	January 19, 1989 (#88003228)	10 SE. Bryant Ave. 46°26′25″N 95°08′13″W	Wadena	1912 multipurpose municipal hall representative of early-20th-century civic development and of a type of public building common to many small Minnesota cities.

== Former listings ==
	Name on the Register	Image	Date listed	Date removed	Location	City or town	Description
1	Peterson-Biddick Seed and Feed Company	Peterson-Biddick Seed and Feed Company	January 30, 1989 (#88003227)	October 23, 2023	102 SE. Aldrich Ave. 46°26′24″N 95°08′05″W	Wadena	Complex built 1916–1936 of a small wholesaling business that grew into one of Minnesota's largest independent agricultural companies. Demolished except for a c. 1935 warehouse addition.

== Watonwan County ==
	Name on the Register	Image	Date listed	Location	City or town	Description
1	Flanders' Block	Flanders' Block	March 8, 1984 (#84001714)	30 W. Main St. 44°03′02″N 94°25′04″W	Madelia	Commercial building used to house the county offices, courthouse, and jail 1872–1878.
2	Grand Opera House	Grand Opera House	December 23, 2009 (#09001152)	502 1st Ave., S. 43°58′53″N 94°37′45″W	St. James	St. James' principal venue 1892–1921 for fine performing arts as well as lectures, community events, and graduation ceremonies.
3	Nelson and Albin Cooperative Mercantile Association Store	Nelson and Albin Cooperative Mercantile Association Store	January 7, 1987 (#86003599)	County Highway 6; 44°06′31″N 94°38′23″W	Godahl	General store established in 1894, Minnesota's oldest consumer cooperative still in operation. Better known as the Godahl Store.
4	Alfred R. Voss Farmstead	Alfred R. Voss Farmstead	October 27, 1988 (#88002054)	County Highway 27; 43°57′21″N 94°36′48″W	St. James vicinity	Southern Minnesota's largest private 19th-century farm, established by prominent local Alfred R. Voss (1860–1952) in 1893. Also noted for two unusually large, elaborate buildings among the 13 contributing properties.
5	Watonwan County Courthouse	Watonwan County Courthouse	January 7, 1987 (#86003591)	7th St., S. and 2nd Ave., S. 43°58′52″N 94°37′32″W	St. James	Exemplary Romanesque Revival courthouse built 1895–96; also significant as Watonwan County's long-serving seat of government.
6	West Bridge	West Bridge	December 3, 2013 (#13000883)	Adj. to Cty. Rd. 116 over Watonwan River; 44°02′40″N 94°25′54″W	Madelia	1908 steel truss bridge, the only surviving work of seminal Minnesota bridge builder Commodore P. Jones. Also noted for its early use of riveted joints.

== Wilkin County ==
	Name on the Register	Image	Date listed	Location	City or town	Description
1	Femco Farm No. 2	Femco Farm No. 2	July 17, 1980 (#80002184)	County Road 153; 46°27′27″N 96°39′34″W	Kent vicinity	1922 farm with nine contributing properties, the best preserved of five Femco Farms established by newspaper publisher Frederick E. Murphy (d. 1940) in Wilkin County to experiment with diversified farming and stock breeding.
2	J. A. Johnson Blacksmith Shop	J. A. Johnson Blacksmith Shop	February 23, 1996 (#96000174)	Junction of Main Ave. W. and 2nd St. W. 46°28′31″N 96°16′59″W	Rothsay	1903 blacksmith shop with many of its original tools, a rare intact example of a type once common in Midwestern agricultural communities.
3	David N. Peet Farmstead		July 17, 1980 (#80002187)	County Road 32; 46°37′01″N 96°38′44″W	Wolverton vicinity	Farmstead of a prosperous late-19th-century farmer, with four contributing properties built 1901–1920.
4	Stiklestad United Lutheran Church	Stiklestad United Lutheran Church	July 17, 1980 (#80002183)	County Road 17; 46°10′38″N 96°24′34″W	Doran vicinity	Church built 1897–8, significant for its Carpenter Gothic architecture and association with the area's Norwegian immigrants.
5	Wilkin County Courthouse	Wilkin County Courthouse	July 17, 1980 (#80002182)	316 S. 5th 46°15′38″N 96°35′14″W	Breckenridge	1928 courthouse significant for its Beaux-Arts architecture and as the seat of county government.
6	Wolverton Public School	Wolverton Public School	July 17, 1980 (#80002188)	N. 1st St. 46°33′55″N 96°44′08″W	Wolverton	Long-serving school built in 1906 and expanded in 1917.

=== Former listings ===
	Name on the Register	Image	Date listed	Date removed	Location	City or town	Description
1	IOOF Hall		July 17, 1980 (#80002185)	May 7, 1990	1st Ave. SW and 1st St.	Rothsay	1899 Independent Order of Odd Fellows hall. Demolished in 1988.
2	Tenney Fire Hall	Tenney Fire Hall	July 17, 1980 (#80002186)	November 27, 2017	Concord Ave. 46°02′40″N 96°27′12″W	Tenney	1904 fire station representative of municipal services in Minnesota's smallest towns. Destroyed by a fire in 2010.

== Yellow Medicine County ==
	Name on the Register	Image	Date listed	Location	City or town	Description
1	Canby Commercial Historic District	Canby Commercial Historic District	November 25, 1980 (#80002189)	Roughly 1st and 2nd Sts. and St. Olaf Ave. 44°42′33″N 96°16′34″W	Canby	Regional trade center and well-preserved example of western Minnesota's commercial districts rebuilt after disastrous fires, with 24 contributing properties built 1892–1930s.
2	John G. Lund House	John G. Lund House	October 2, 1978 (#78001575)	101 W. 4th St. 44°42′42″N 96°16′22″W	Canby	1891 house and carriage barn of an influential local land speculator, banker, and politician. Also noted for the house's 1900 Queen Anne remodeling. Now the Lund–Hoel House museum.
3	Lundring Service Station	Lundring Service Station	June 20, 1986 (#86001356)	201 1st St. E. 44°42′28″N 96°16′30″W	Canby	1926 example of the small, period revival gas stations built in the United States in the 1920s and '30s, and a distinctive use of English Cottage Revival architecture.
4	Swede Prairie Progressive Farmers' Club		June 13, 1986 (#86001331)	County Highway 9; 44°39′34″N 95°54′12″W	Clarkfield vicinity	1915 meeting hall of a local farmers' organization, a rare physical reminder of the grassroots agricultural movements of the early 20th century. Likely demolished.
5	Upper Sioux Agency	Upper Sioux Agency	October 15, 1970 (#70000315)	Upper Sioux Agency State Park; 44°44′04″N 95°27′07″W	Granite Falls vicinity	Site of a federal indian agency active 1854–1862, with one standing building. Significant for its precontact archaeology, rare physical evidence of the agency period, and association with the nation's disastrous mid-19th-century Federal Indian Policy.
6	Andrew John Volstead House	Andrew John Volstead House	December 30, 1974 (#74001046)	163 9th Ave. 44°48′33″N 95°32′24″W	Granite Falls	House from 1894 to 1930 of 10-term Congressman Andrew Volstead (1860–1947), author of the Volstead Act that enabled Prohibition in the United States, and the Capper–Volstead Act that legalized agricultural cooperatives. Now a museum.
7	Wood Lake Battlefield Historic District	Wood Lake Battlefield Historic District	July 30, 2010 (#10000517)	2136 600th St. 44°42′26″N 95°26′20″W	Sioux Agency Township	Site of the Battle of Wood Lake, final engagement of the Dakota War of 1862, a watershed period for the state of Minnesota and the Dakota people. District encompasses the late-September 1862 staging and battle sites and a 1910 monument that embodies early-20th-century commemoration efforts.

== See also ==
- List of National Historic Landmarks in Minnesota
- National Register of Historic Places listings in Voyageurs National Park
- List of historical societies in Minnesota
