= Sacred Heart Public School =

- U.S. National Register of Historic Places
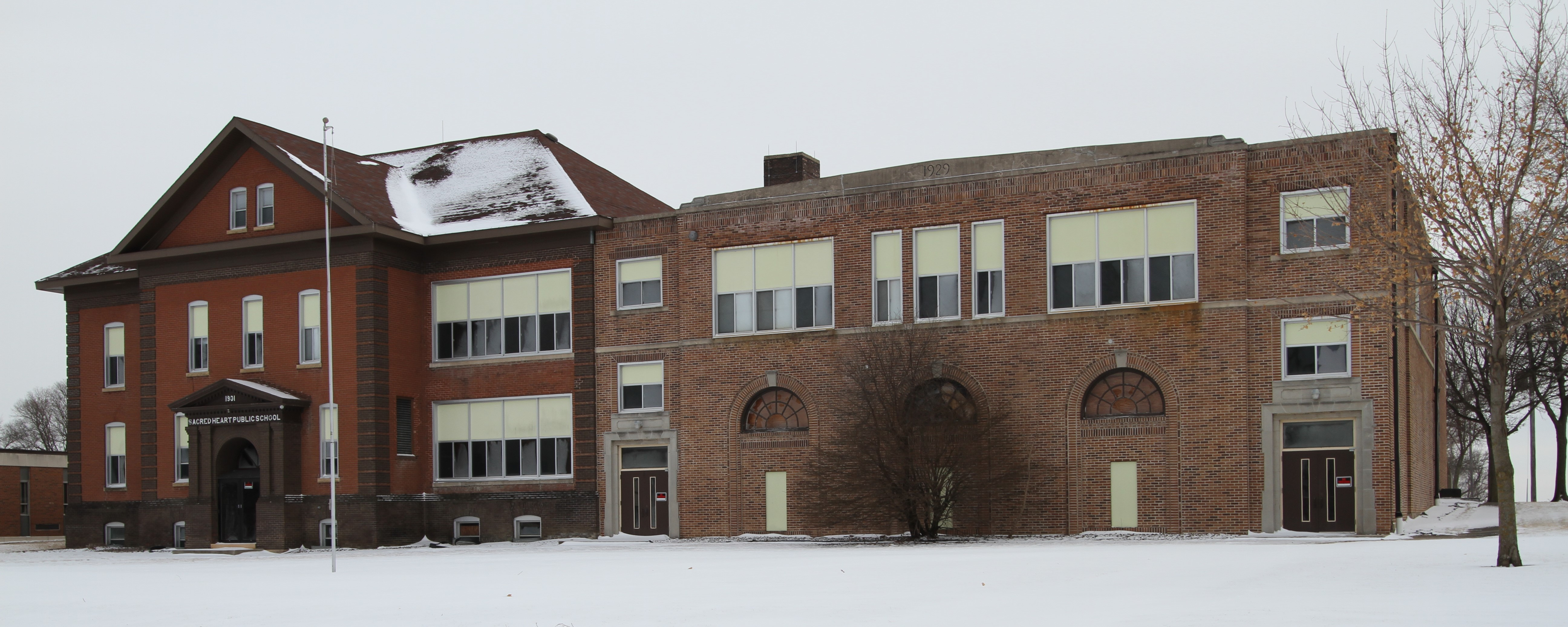
- The school in 2018

- Location within Minnesota Location within the United States
- Location: 100 Elm Street, Sacred Heart, Minnesota
- Coordinates: 44°47′0″N 95°21′2″W
- Area: 3.6 acres (1.5 ha)
- Built: 1901, expanded 1929, 1953, 1964, & 1974
- Architect: E.S. Stebbins
- Architectural style: Colonial Revival
- NRHP reference No.: 14000869
- Added to NRHP: October 20, 2014

Sacred Heart Public School was a former school facility in Sacred Heart, Minnesota, United States. The original building was constructed in 1901 and expanded in 1929, 1953, 1964, and 1974. It was listed on the National Register of Historic Places in 2014 for having local significance in education, entertainment/recreation, and social history. Its construction history reflects the 20th-century growth and educational expansion of small-town public schools, while its 1929 auditorium/gymnasium also served as Sacred Heart's primary venue for public functions. The school closed in 2009, though the building was still used for local events. It was demolished in 2023.

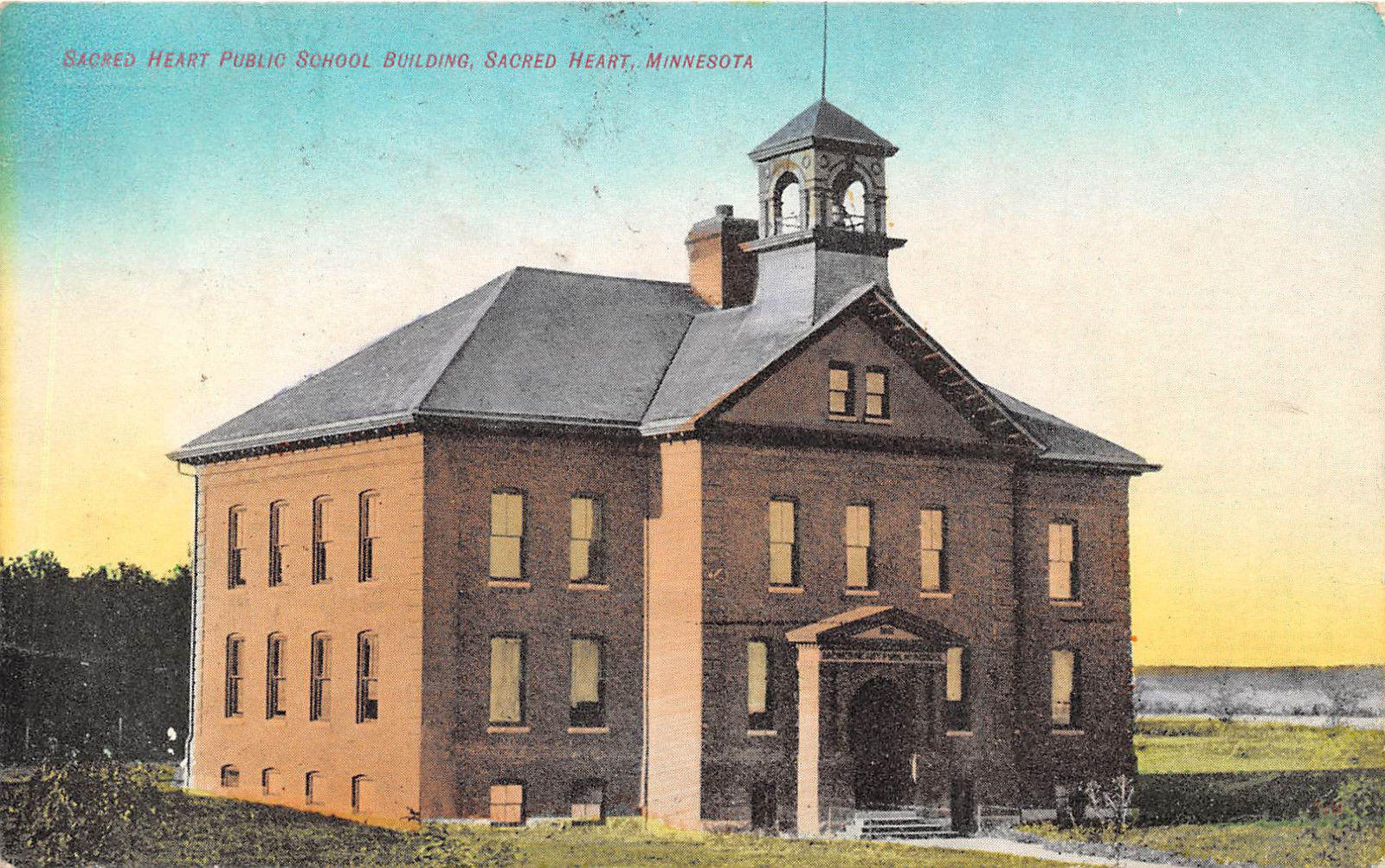
The school on a 1903 postcard

== See also ==
- National Register of Historic Places listings in Renville County, Minnesota
