= Gaylord City Park =

Park in Minnesota, United States

- U.S. National Register of Historic Places
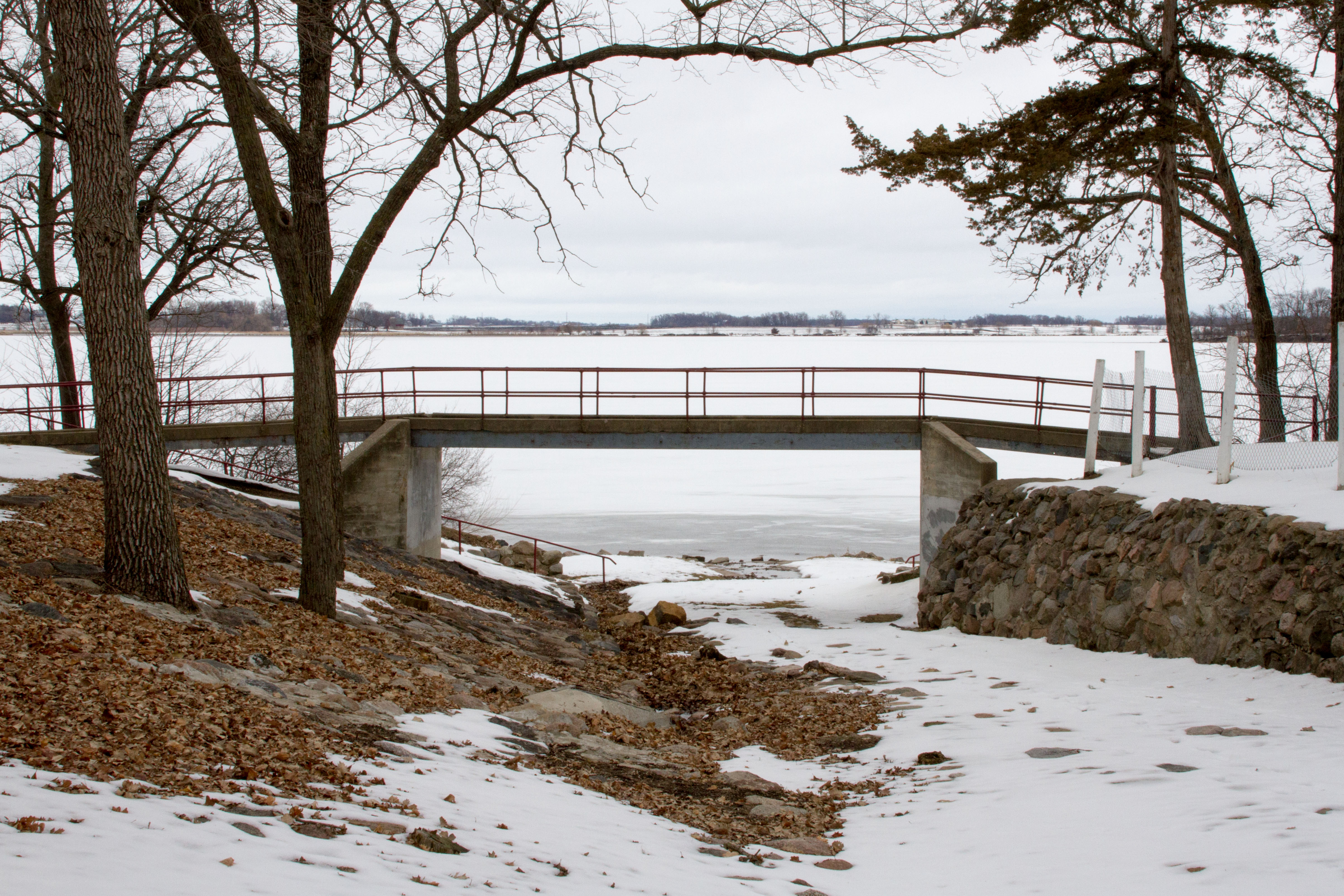
- Gaylord City Park on the shore of Lake Titlow

- Location within Minnesota Location within the United States
- Location: Veterans Drive and Park Street, Gaylord, Minnesota
- Coordinates: 44°33′38″N 94°13′17″W
- Area: 6.93 acres (2.80 ha)
- Built: 1897–1945
- Built by: Charles Guetschoff (pavilion), J.A. Kuehner (bandstand), Works Progress Administration (bridge)
- NRHP reference No.: 11001085
- Added to NRHP: February 6, 2012

Gaylord City Park is a city park in Gaylord, Minnesota, United States, on the south shore of Lake Titlow. First established in 1897, the park grounds contain a 1916 dance pavilion, 1940 bandshell, and a 1940 bridge built by the Works Progress Administration. The historic core of the park was listed on the National Register of Historic Places in 2012 for its local significance in the theme of entertainment/recreation. It was nominated for its long-serving importance as a community gathering space, hosting concerts, festivals, sporting events, circuses, speeches, and family picnics.

The park is part of the Gaylord City Park System and is overseen by the Park & Recreation Board of the city's Board of Directors.

== See also ==
- National Register of Historic Places listings in Sibley County, Minnesota
