= Isaac Bargen House =

Historic house in Minnesota, United States

- U.S. National Register of Historic Places
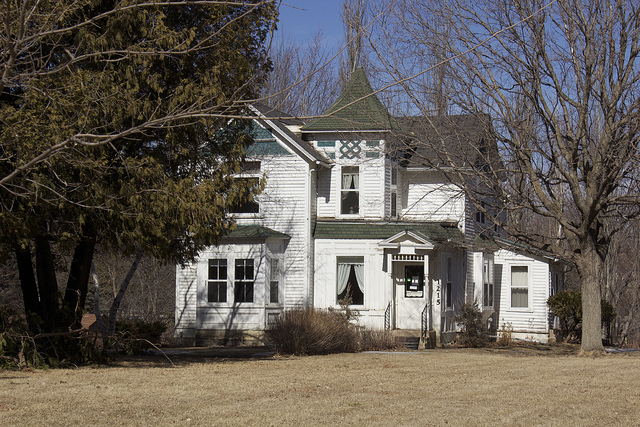

- Location within Minnesota
- Location: 1215 Mountain Lake Road, Mountain Lake, Minnesota
- Coordinates: 43.934372°N 94.925502°W
- Area: 2 acres (0.81 ha)
- Built: 1888
- Architectural style: Queen Anne
- NRHP reference No.: 86001285
- Added to NRHP: June 13, 1986

The Isaac Bargen House is a historic house located in Mountain Lake, Minnesota, Minnesota, United States, built in 1888.

== Description and history ==
It was originally built as the house Isaac A. Bargen (1857–1943), a transformational educator and administrator who was one of the first in his Mennonite community to promote secular public education and government service. The house was added to the National Register of Historic Places on June 13, 1986.

== See also ==
- National Register of Historic Places listings in Cottonwood County
