= Mahnomen County Courthouse =

- U.S. National Register of Historic Places
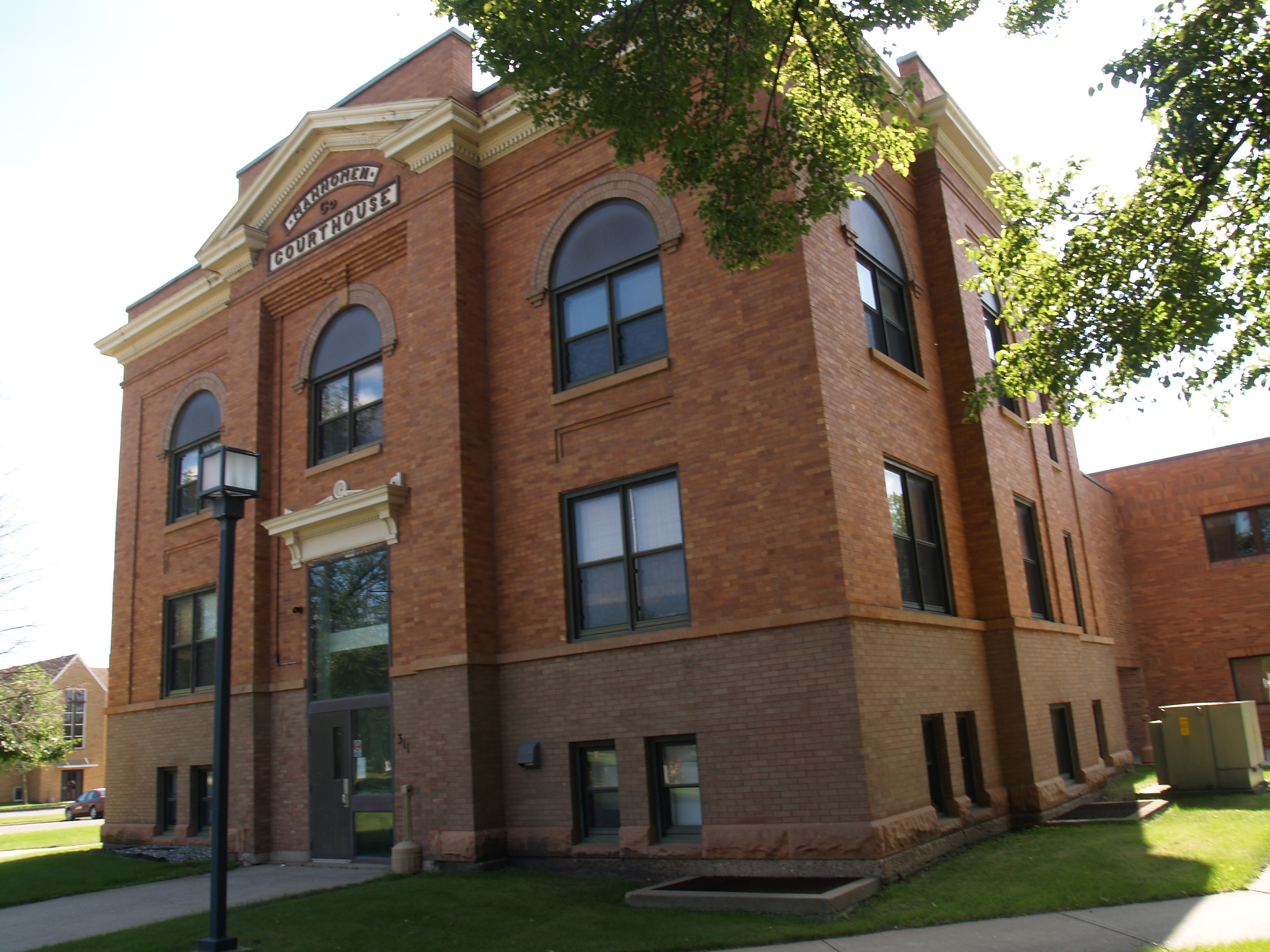

- Location within Minnesota Location within the United States
- Location: 311 North Main Street, Mahnomen
- Coordinates: 47°19′4″N 95°58′10″W
- Area: Less than one acre
- Built: 1909
- Architect: Kinney and Halden of Minneapolis
- Architectural style: Classical Revival
- NRHP reference No.: 84001488
- Added to NRHP: February 16, 1984

The Mahnomen County Courthouse is a Classical Revival brick building at 311 North Main Street in Mahnomen, Minnesota, United States. It was completed in 1909 at a cost of $10,000.

It was still a functioning courthouse when it was added to the National Register of Historic Places in 1984.

== See also ==
- National Register of Historic Places listings in Mahnomen County, Minnesota
