= Swede Prairie Progressive Farmers' Club =

- U.S. National Register of Historic Places
- Location within Minnesota Location within the United States
- Location: Yellow Medicine County Highway 9 near Clarkfield, Minnesota
- Coordinates: 44°39′35″N 95°54′12″W
- Built: 1915
- NRHP reference No.: 86001331
- Designated: June 13, 1986

The Swede Prairie Progressive Farmers' Club, also known as Roberg Hall, was a 1915 meeting hall of a local farmers' organization in Swede Prairie Township, Yellow Medicine County, Minnesota, United States, which became the township hall. It was listed on the National Register of Historic Places in 1986 as a rare physical reminder of the grassroots agricultural movements of the early 20th century.

== See also ==
- National Register of Historic Places listings in Yellow Medicine County, Minnesota
