= Canby Commercial Historic District =

Historic district in Minnesota, United States

- U.S. National Register of Historic Places
- U.S. Historic district
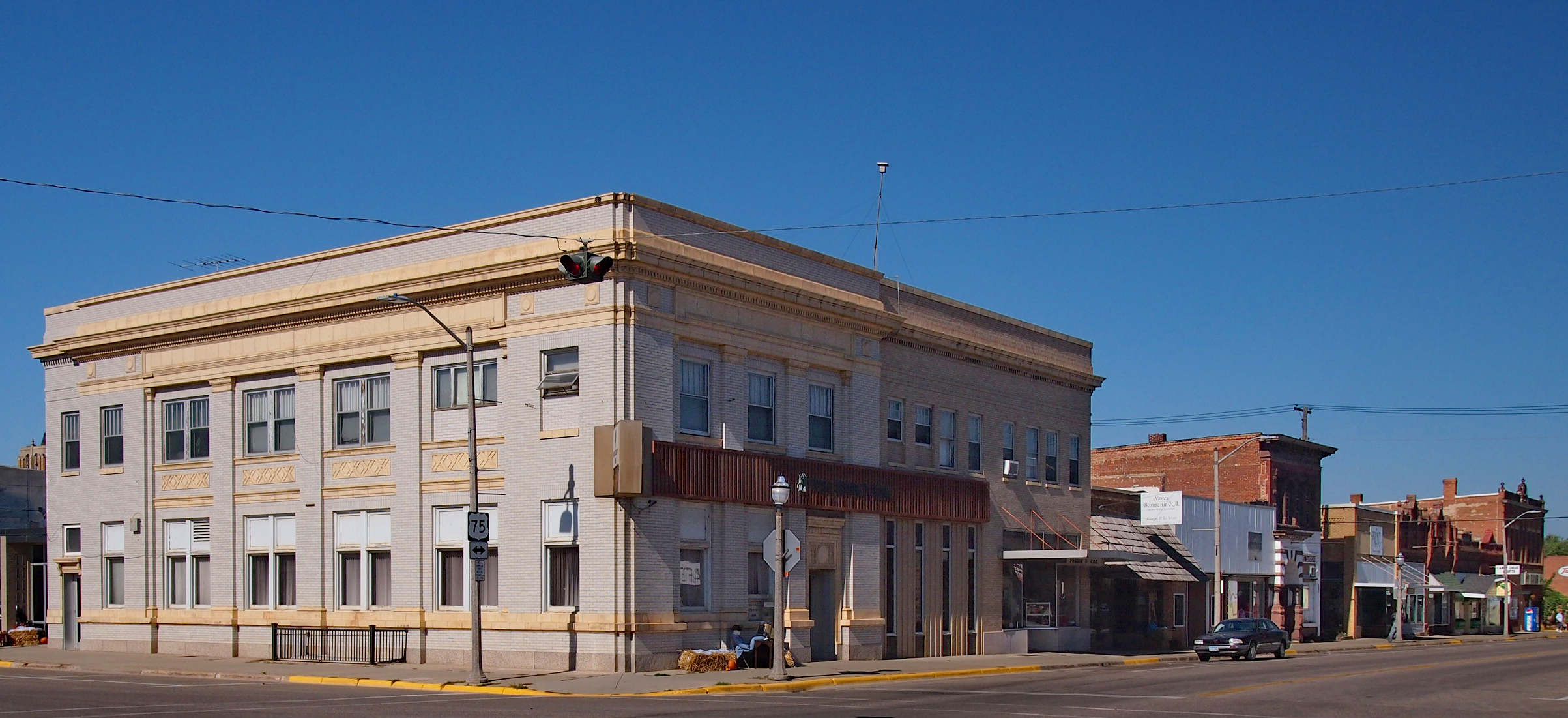
- Part of the Canby Commercial Historic District

- Location within Minnesota Location within the United States
- Location: Roughly 1st and 2nd Streets and St. Olaf Avenue, Canby, Minnesota
- Coordinates: 44°42′33″N 96°16′34″W
- Area: 7.5 acres (3.0 ha)
- Built: 1892–1930s
- Architectural style: Art Deco, Italianate
- NRHP reference No.: 80002189
- Designated HD: November 25, 1980

The Canby Commercial Historic District is a designation applied to the historic downtown of Canby, Minnesota, United States. It comprises 24 contributing properties built from 1892 to the 1930s. It was listed as a historic district on the National Register of Historic Places in 1980 for having local significance in the theme of commerce. It was nominated for being a well-preserved example of western Minnesota's commercial districts rebuilt after disastrous fires, and a longstanding regional trade center.

== See also ==
- National Register of Historic Places listings in Yellow Medicine County, Minnesota
