= Henderson Commercial Historic District (Henderson, Minnesota) =

Historic business district in Minnesota, United States

- U.S. National Register of Historic Places
- U.S. Historic district
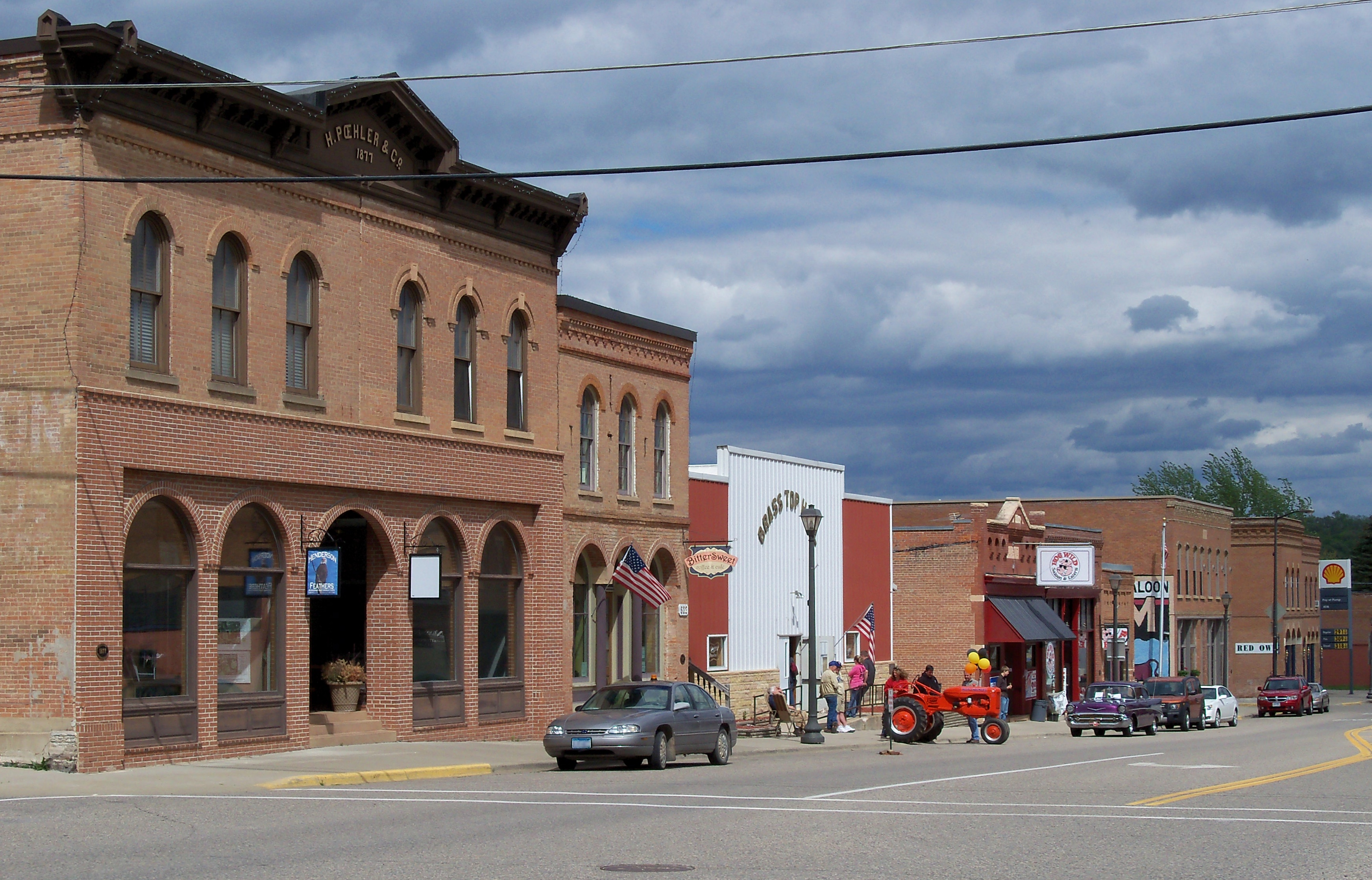
- The north streetscape of Henderson Commercial Historic District

- Location within Minnesota Location within the United States
- Location: Roughly Main Street between 5th and 6th Streets, Henderson, Minnesota
- Coordinates: 44°31′42″N 93°54′25″W
- Area: 1 acre (0.40 ha)
- Built: 1874–circa 1905
- Architect: Unknown
- Architectural style: Italianate, Queen Anne
- NRHP reference No.: 88002834
- Added to NRHP: December 20, 1988

The Henderson Commercial Historic District is the historic business district of Henderson, Minnesota, United States. It comprises 12 contributing properties built from 1874 to about 1905 around Henderson's main intersection. It was listed as a historic district on the National Register of Historic Places in 1988 for its local significance in the themes of architecture and exploration/settlement. The district was nominated for being a well-preserved link to Henderson's development as an agriculturally-focused river town and Sibley County's initial county seat.

== See also ==
- National Register of Historic Places listings in Sibley County, Minnesota
