= Ogilvie Watertower =

- U.S. National Register of Historic Places
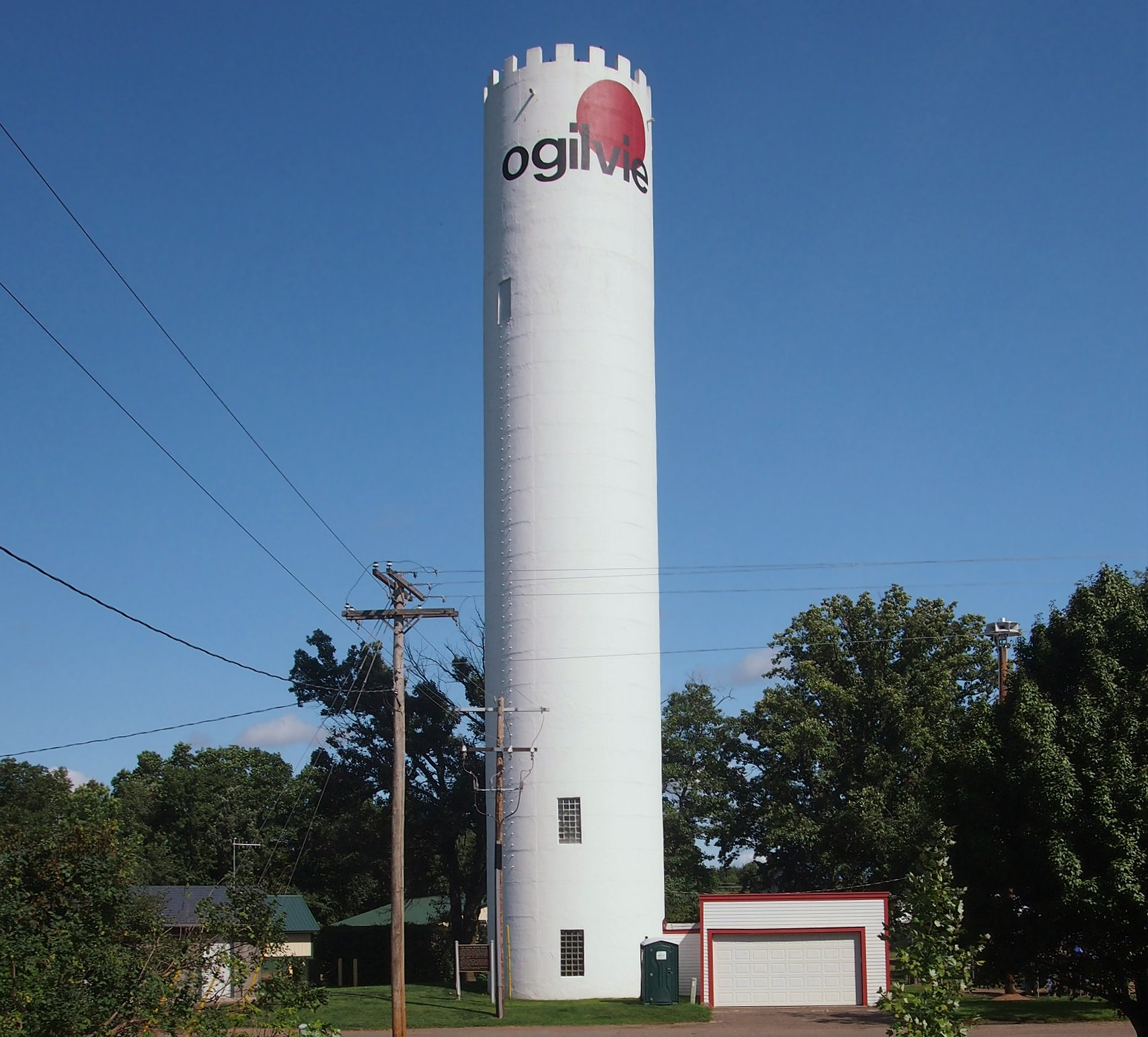
- The Ogilvie Watertower from the south

- Location within Minnesota Location within the United States
- Location: Anderson Street, Ogilvie, Minnesota
- Coordinates: 45°49′51.5″N 93°25′41″W
- Area: Less than one acre
- Built: 1918
- Architect: Circular Concrete Company of Minneapolis
- MPS: Kanabec County MRA
- NRHP reference No.: 80002087
- Designated: August 18, 1980

The Ogilvie Watertower is a historic water tower in Ogilvie, Minnesota, United States, built in 1918. It was listed on the National Register of Historic Places in 1980 for having local significance in the themes of engineering and social history. It was nominated for being a rare surviving example of Minnesota's earliest reinforced concrete water towers and a symbol of the local infrastructure improvements that enabled the organization of Ogilvie's fire department.

== Description ==
The Ogilvie Watertower is a cylinder 80 feet (24 m) tall and 21 feet 6 inches (6.55 m) in diameter. The nine-inch-thick (23 cm) concrete walls were poured in place. The water is stored in a 24-foot-2-inch-high (7.37 m), 50,000-US-gallon (190,000 L) concrete tank within the upper reaches of the tower. The structure is topped by a two-foot-high (0.61 m) parapet with crenellations that suggest a medieval fortified tower.

A wood-frame garage is attached to the base of the tower on the east. Entrance to the tower is effected through double steel doors facing east. There are three 32-light windows at ground level and four more at the level of an internal wooden platform. At the 72-foot (22 m) level, a southwest-facing door once opened onto a small platform attached to the outside of the tower.

== History ==
The Ogilvie Watertower was one of the first water towers in Minnesota to be constructed of reinforced concrete. It was cast in place by the Circular Concrete Company of Minneapolis in 1918. Its design was a noticeable contrast to the metal tank towers found in many other communities around the state, such as the Cuyuna Iron Range Municipally-Owned Elevated Metal Water Tanks. Although other concrete water towers were built, they tended to leak at the base of the internal tank, so most have been demolished and replaced. The Ogilvie Watertower is one of the few examples of its type still standing.

At the same time this tower was built, the village had an improved water system installed. This provided the infrastructure necessary for Ogilvie to organize its first volunteer fire department.

The water tower was extensively restored and repainted in 1977. It was finally decommissioned in August 2011, an event commemorated by a public ceremony at the tower followed by a parade to and dedication ceremony at its modern replacement.

== See also ==
- National Register of Historic Places listings in Kanabec County, Minnesota
