= Drammen Farmers' Club =

- U.S. National Register of Historic Places
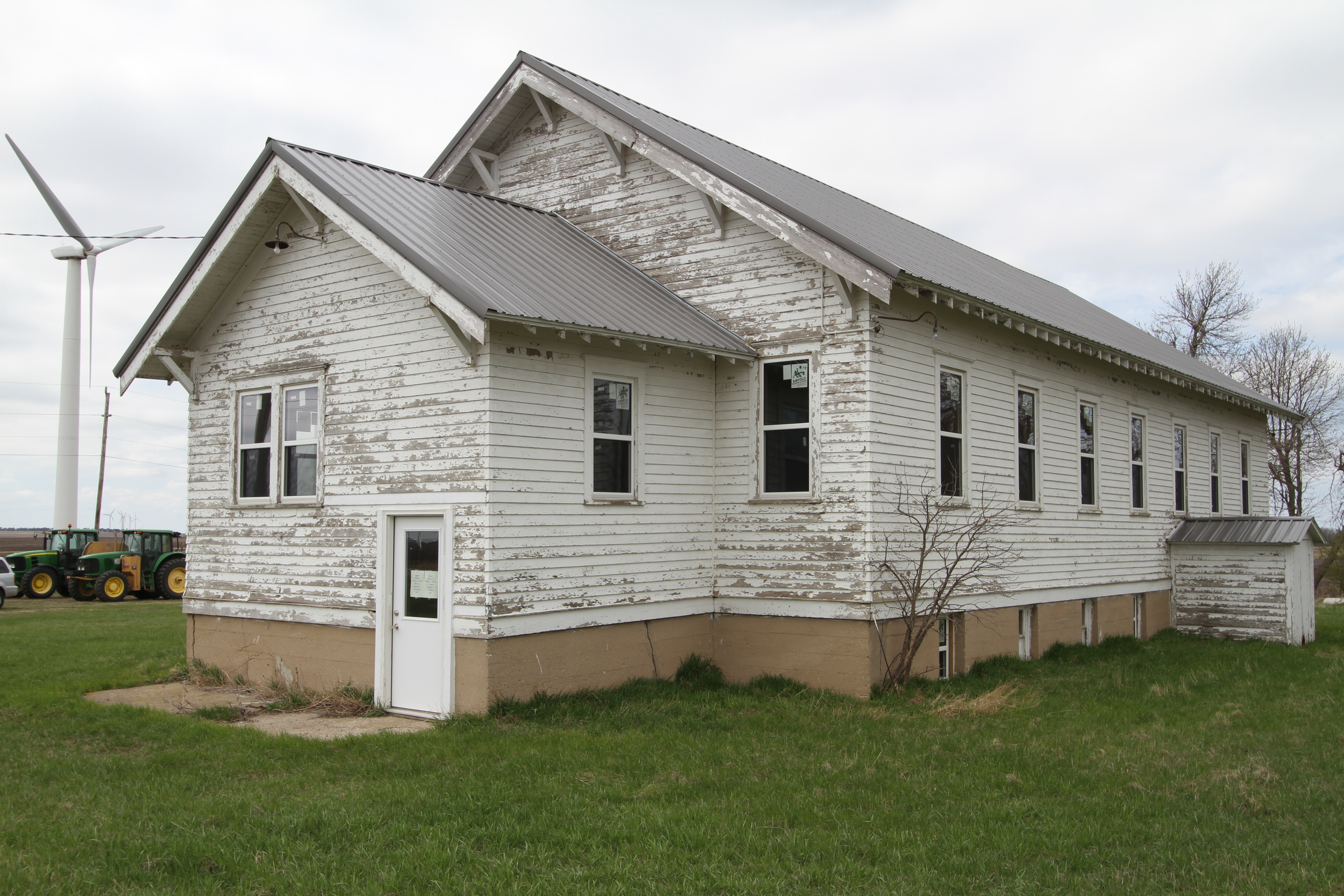
- The building in 2018

- Location within Minnesota Location within the United States
- Location: County Highway 13, Drammen Township, Lincoln County, Minnesota
- Coordinates: 44°19′40″N 96°22′58″W
- Built: 1921
- NRHP reference No.: 80004539
- Added to NRHP: December 1, 1980

The Drammen Farmers' Club is a meeting hall built in 1921 by a purely social (rather than religious or political) club to host events for a sparsely populated agricultural community in Drammen Township, Lincoln County, Minnesota, United States. After long service as a local community center, it was listed on the National Register of Historic Places in 1980 and became the town hall for the township.
