= Roseau Memorial Arena =

Ice hockey arena in Minnesota, United States

- U.S. National Register of Historic Places
- Location within Minnesota Location within the United States
- Location: 321 2nd Avenue NW, Roseau, Minnesota
- Coordinates: 48°50′56.5″N 95°45′52″W
- Area: 2.69 acres (1.09 ha)
- Built: 1949, 1955
- NRHP reference No.: 100011014
- Added to NRHP: November 5, 2024

Roseau Memorial Arena is a municipal ice hockey arena in Roseau, Minnesota, United States. It was built in 1949 and expanded in 1955 with a warming house at the front entrance. Since the middle of the 20th century, the arena has served as Roseau's primary venue for a sport that is central to the social fabric many northern Minnesota communities. The arena was listed on the National Register of Historic Places in 2024 for its significance in the theme of entertainment/recreation. It was nominated for being a long-serving center of community activity and identity.

== See also ==
- National Register of Historic Places listings in Roseau County, Minnesota
