= Warroad station =

- Canadian National Depot
- U.S. National Register of Historic Places
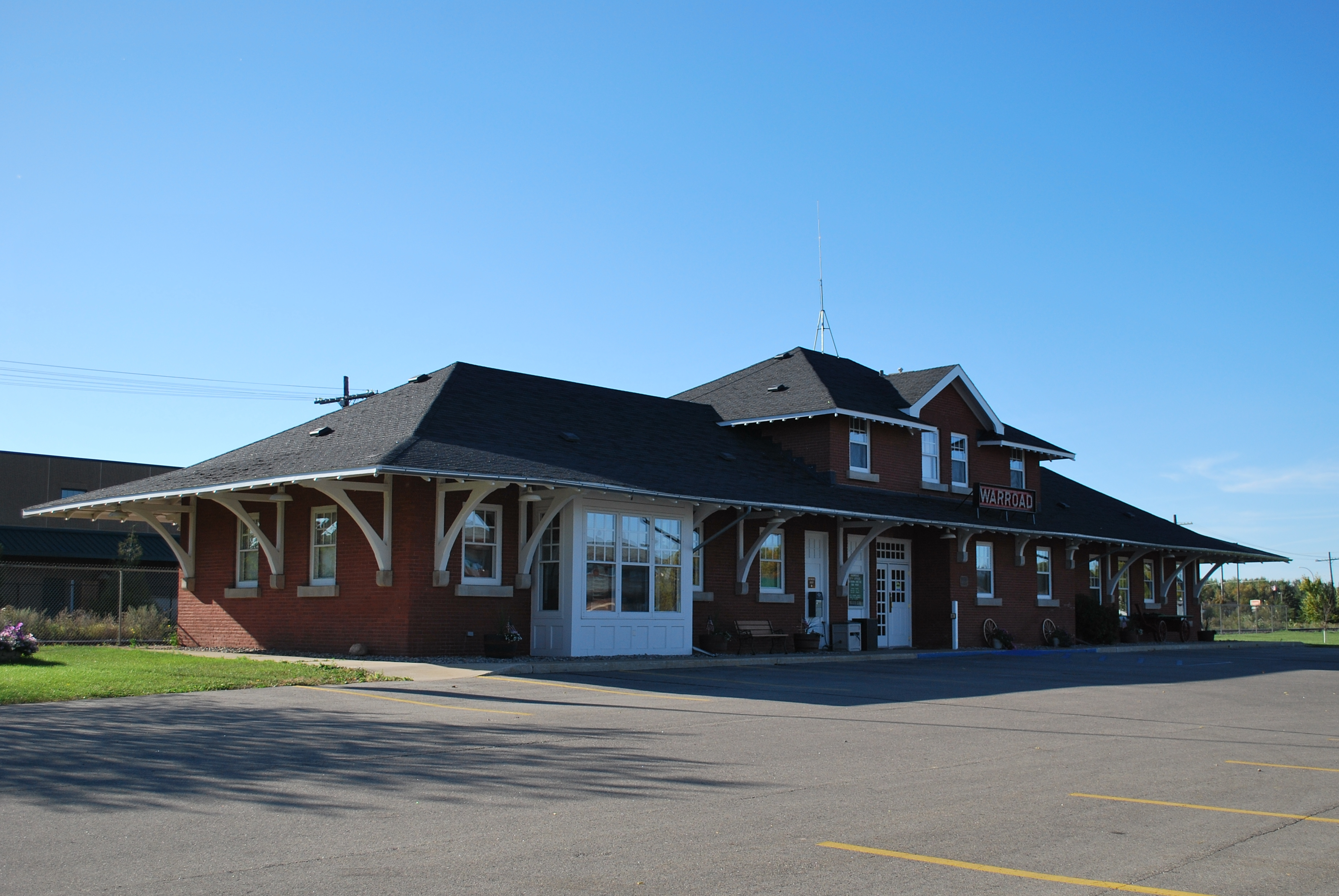

- Location within Minnesota Location within the United States
- Location: Warroad, Minnesota
- Coordinates: 48°54′23″N 95°19′6″W
- Built: 1914
- Architect: Schofield, J.
- NRHP reference No.: 82003034
- Added to NRHP: April 6, 1982

Canadian National Depot or Warroad Depot is a former railway station for the Canadian National Railway. The building now serves as an office for the City of Warroad in the U.S. state of Minnesota.

Preceding station	Canadian National Railway	Following station
Middlebro toward Winnipeg	Winnipeg – Port Arthur	Swift toward Port Arthur
