= Baudette Depot =

Museum in Baudette, Minnesota

- Canadian National Railways Depot
- U.S. National Register of Historic Places
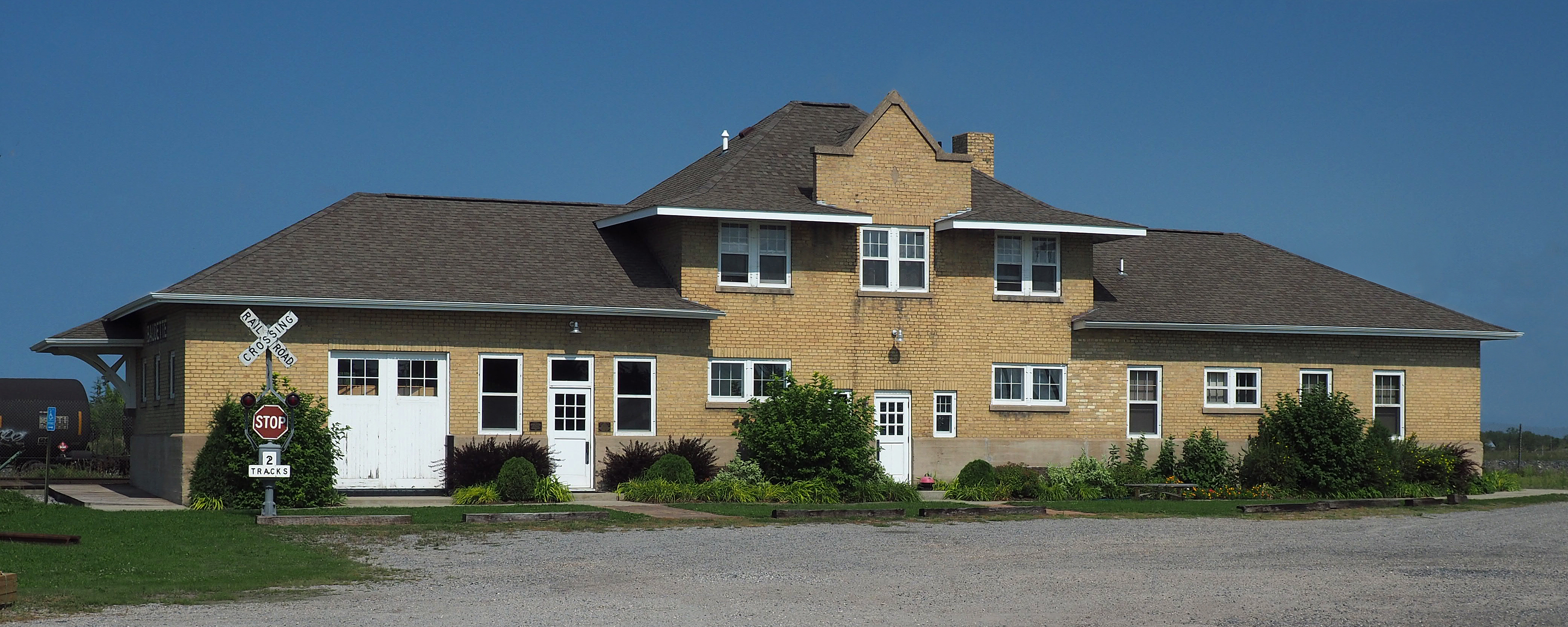
- Baudette Depot (2021)

- Location within Minnesota Location within the United States
- Location: Baudette, Minnesota
- Coordinates: 48°42′58″N 94°36′0″W
- Built: 1923
- Architect: Schofield, John
- NRHP reference No.: 05000809
- Added to NRHP: August 7, 2005

Baudette Depot Museum
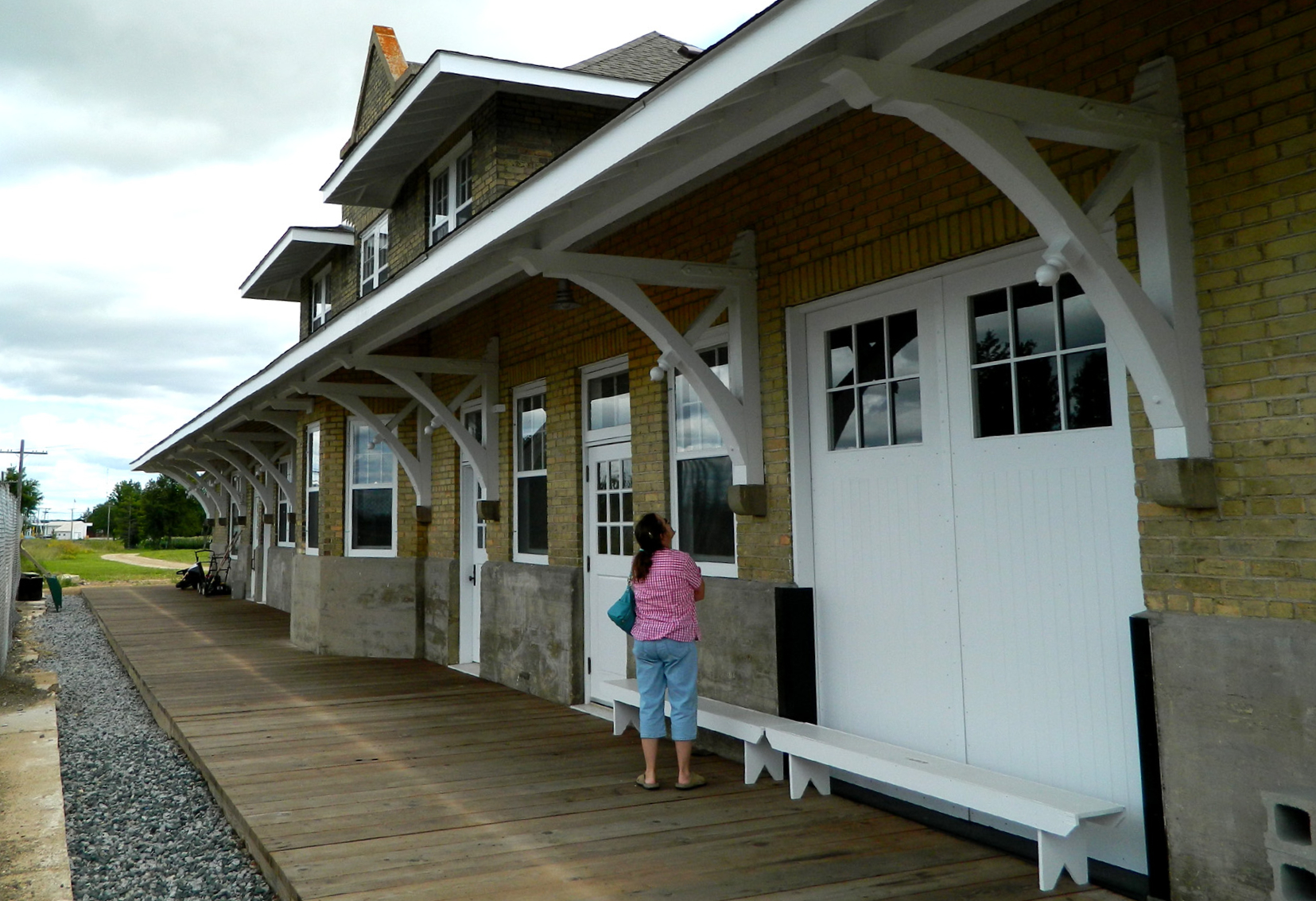
- Visitor reading historic graffiti on wall
- Established: 2011
- Location: 420 Main Avenue NE, Baudette, Minnesota United States
- Type: Local History

Canadian National Railways Depot or Baudette Depot in Baudette, Minnesota, is a preserved historic railway depot built by the Canadian National Railway in 1923 which reflects the region's transportation past and serves as a museum. The museum features displays on the history of train travel and of the depot.

== Early history ==
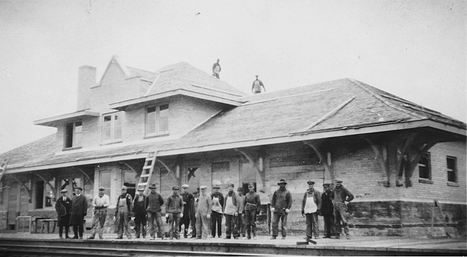
Depot under construction (1922)

The Baudette Depot was built in 1923 by the Canadian National Railways, replacing two earlier depots from 1901 and 1908 that were lost to fires. The station functioned as a hub for both people and goods. It handled freight, groceries, mail, and local products such as timber, fish, furs, grain, and blueberries. The depot served the area until the mid-1980s, when railway use declined and the building was abandoned. During its peak, the depot was central to the movement of community residents, workers, and travelers, and it contributed to the rise and decline of commercial industries in the area.

== Preservation and Reuse as a Museum ==
After being abandoned for more than twenty years, the depot was at risk for demolition. In 1997, local residents organized the Depot Preservation Alliance to save and repurpose the building. The Alliance acquired the depot from Canadian National Railways for $1.00. Capital was raised to fund repairs and renovation efforts from 1997 through 2011. The depot achieved listing on the National Register of Historic Places in August 2005. Restoration of the building’s interior and exterior took place between 2010 and 2011, supported by grants and community support. The restored building now operates on land leased from the railway and is managed with ongoing community involvement.

== Programming and Exhibits ==
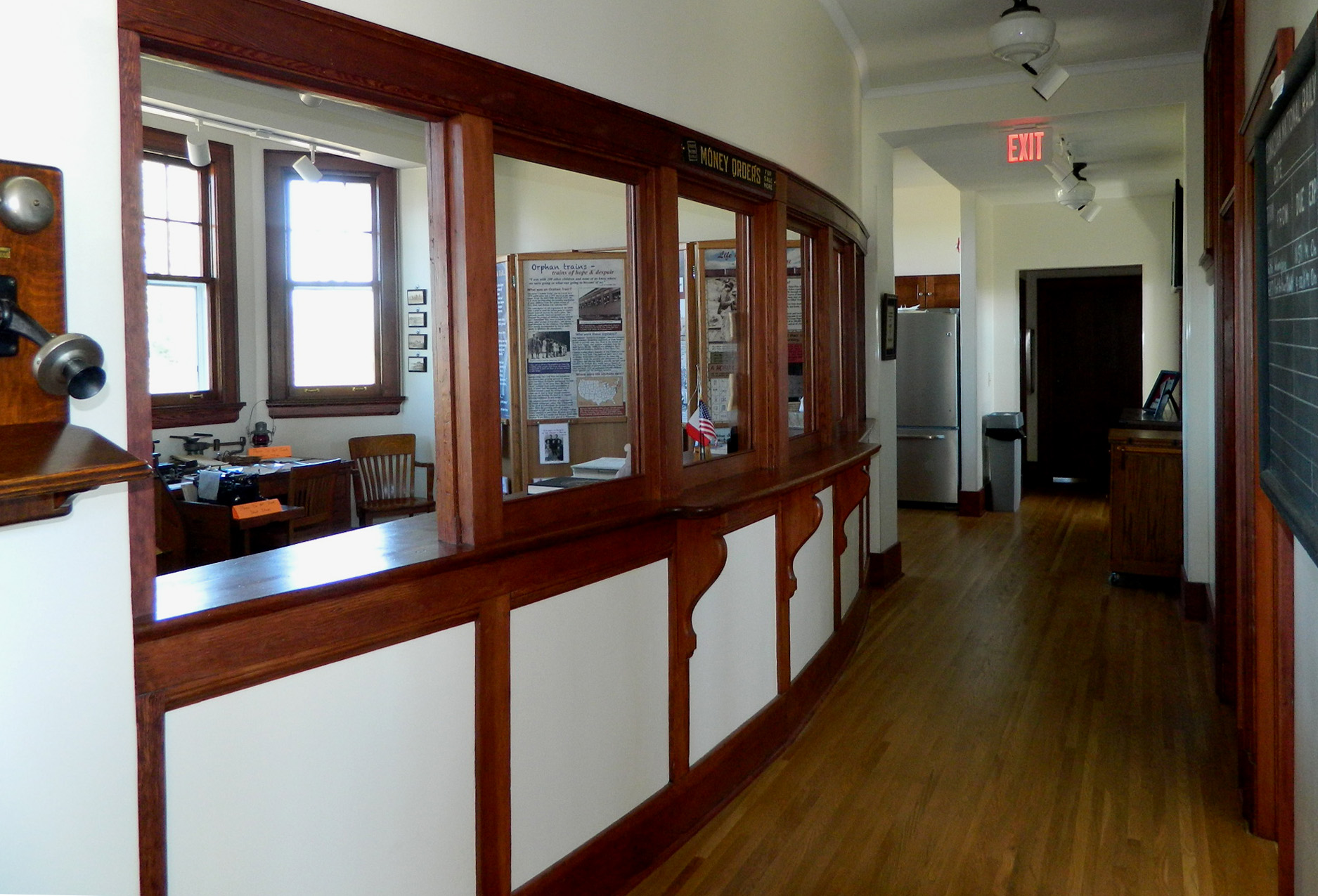
Ticket counter (2012)

The Museum offers interpretive exhibits on local rail history and the changing face of the county’s industries and communities. Displays provide information about passenger travel, freight movements, and the significance of the railroad to Lake of the Woods County. The museum programming often includes educational tours, local history resources, and partnerships for walking tours and public events.

Preceding station	Canadian National Railway	Following station
Pitt toward Winnipeg	Winnipeg – Port Arthur	Rainy River toward Port Arthur
