= Heins Block =

- U.S. National Register of Historic Places
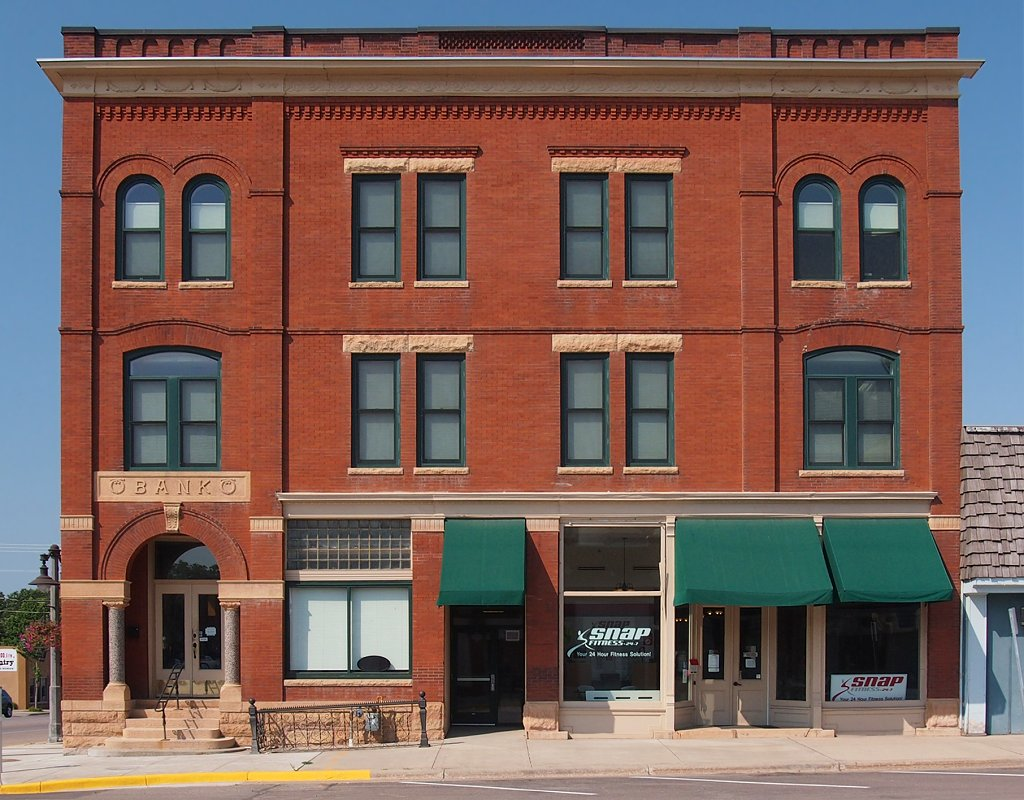

- Location within Minnesota Location within the United States
- Location: 102-104 N. 9th St., Olivia, Minnesota
- Coordinates: 44°46′36″N 94°59′23″W
- Area: less than one acre
- Built: 1896
- Architect: Hedlund, A.J.
- Architectural style: Queen Anne
- NRHP reference No.: 01000842
- Added to NRHP: August 8, 2001

The Heins Block is the most prominent commercial building in the city of Olivia, Minnesota, United States. It was built in 1896 to house a bank and a hardware store owned by P.W. Heins. P.W. Heins opened up his first mercantile store soon after the village of Olivia was surveyed by the Hastings and Dakota Railway. Heins established the Peoples Bank in 1889.

The architect, A.J. Hedlund, designed a Queen Anne-styled house for Heins. After the house was designed, Heins commissioned Hedlund to design a building for the Peoples Bank. The building was completed in 1896 and housed the bank and the Heins and Byers Hardware Store on the first level, with offices and apartments on the second and third levels. It has Romanesque details such as arched window openings, as well as a recessed Roman arched entrance resting above two short columns.
