= Drammen Township, Lincoln County, Minnesota =

Drammen Township, Minnesota
- Township
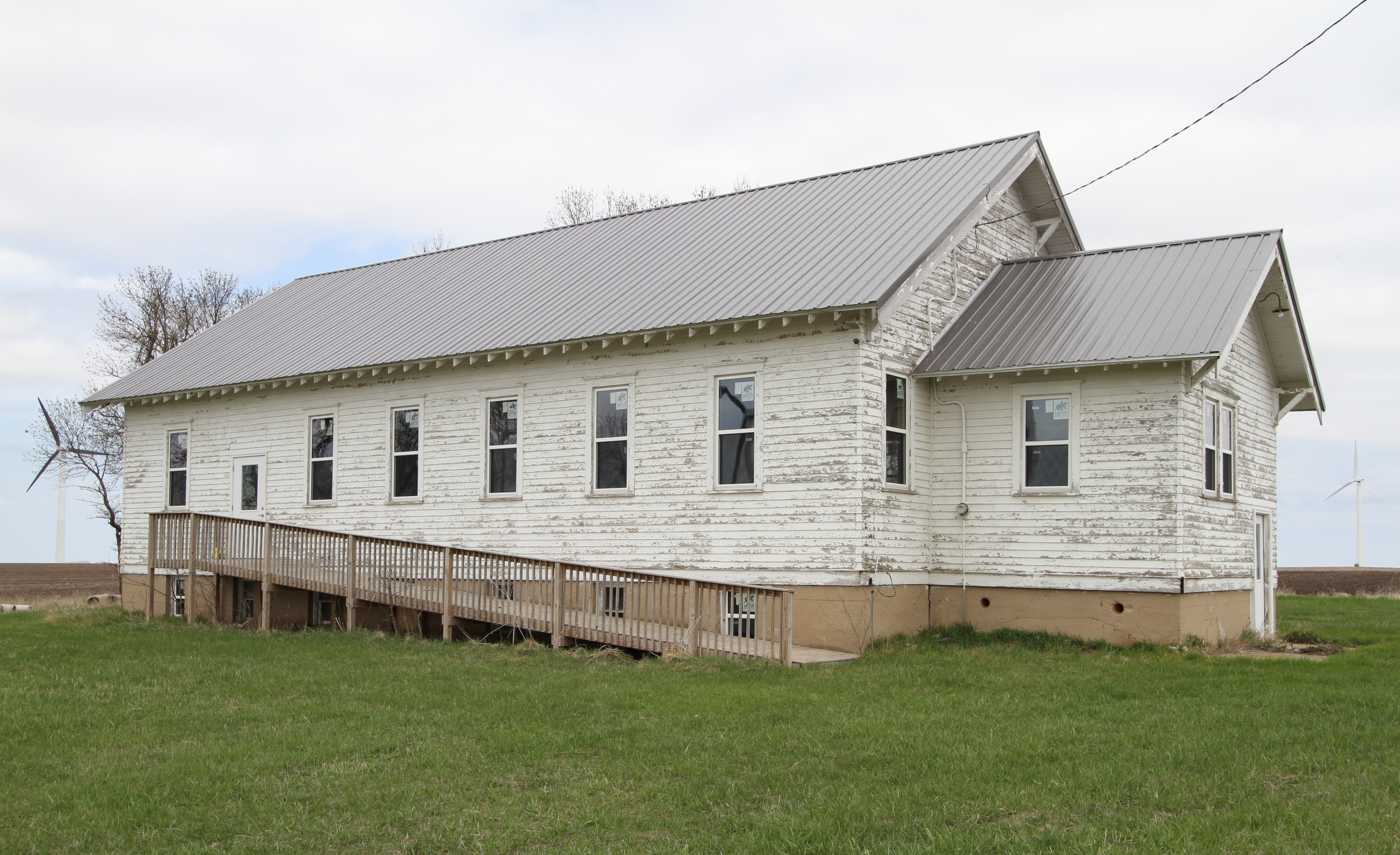
- Drammen Town Hall

- Location within the state of Minnesota Drammen Township, Minnesota (the United States)
- Coordinates: 44°20′5″N 96°23′38″W
- Country: United States
- State: Minnesota
- County: Lincoln

Area
  - Total: 38.6 sq mi (100.1 km^{2})
  - Land: 38.6 sq mi (100.1 km^{2})
  - Water: 0.039 sq mi (0.1 km^{2})
- Elevation: 1,929 ft (588 m)

Population (2000)
  - Total: 141
  - Density: 3.6/sq mi (1.4/km^{2})
- Time zone: UTC-6 (Central (CST))
  - Summer (DST): UTC-5 (CDT)
- FIPS code: 27-16372
- GNIS feature ID: 0664000

Drammen Township is a township in Lincoln County, Minnesota, United States. The population was 141 at the 2000 census.

Drammen Township was named after Drammen, in Norway.

== Geography ==
According to the United States Census Bureau, the township has a total area of 38.7 square miles (100 km^{2}), of which 38.6 square miles (100 km^{2}) is land and 0.04 square miles (0.10 km^{2}) (0.05%) is water.

== Demographics ==
As of the census of 2000, there were 141 people, 50 households, and 42 families residing in the township. The population density was 3.6 inhabitants per square mile (1.4/km^{2}). There were 57 housing units at an average density of 1.5 per square mile (0.58/km^{2}). The racial makeup of the township was 98.58% White and 1.42% African American.

There were 50 households, out of which 38.0% had children under the age of 18 living with them, 80.0% were married couples living together, 2.0% had a female householder with no husband present, and 16.0% were non-families. 14.0% of all households were made up of individuals, and none had someone living alone who was 65 years of age or older. The average household size was 2.82 and the average family size was 3.14.

In the township the population was spread out, with 29.1% under the age of 18, 12.1% from 18 to 24, 26.2% from 25 to 44, 15.6% from 45 to 64, and 17.0% who were 65 years of age or older. The median age was 32 years. For every 100 females, there were 107.4 males. For every 100 females age 18 and over, there were 132.6 males.

The median income for a household in the township was $35,000, and the median income for a family was $35,625. Males had a median income of $26,250 versus $18,125 for females. The per capita income for the township was $13,056. There were 4.4% of families and 4.3% of the population living below the poverty line, including no under eighteens and 14.8% of those over 64.
