= List of bridges documented by the Historic American Engineering Record in Minnesota =

This is a list of bridges documented by the Historic American Engineering Record in the U.S. state of Minnesota.

== Bridges ==
Survey No.	Name (as assigned by HAER)	Status	Type	Built	Documented	Carries	Crosses	Location	County	Coordinates
MN-2	Broadway Bridge	Relocated	Pratt truss	1888	1985	Broadway Street Northeast	Mississippi River	Minneapolis	Hennepin	44°59′56″N 93°16′31″W
MN-5	Smith Avenue High Bridge	Replaced	Warren truss	1889	1984	MN 149 (Smith Avenue)	Mississippi River	Saint Paul	Ramsey	44°55′59″N 93°06′16″W
MN-6	Lake Street-Marshall Avenue Bridge	Replaced	Steel hinged arch	1889	1987	Lake Street and Marshall Avenue	Mississippi River	Minneapolis and Saint Paul	Hennepin and Ramsey	44°56′55″N 93°12′08″W
MN-8	Winona Bridge (Note: See also HAER No. NE-2, "Nebraska City Bridge" for additional documentation)	Abandoned	Swing span	1871	1985	Winona and St. Peter Railroad	Mississippi River	Winona, Minnesota, and Buffalo, Wisconsin	Winona County, Minnesota, and Buffalo County, Wisconsin	44°03′24″N 91°38′20″W
MN-18	Steel Arch Bridge	Replaced	Steel arch	1891	1986	Hennepin Avenue	Mississippi River	Minneapolis	Hennepin	44°59′07″N 93°15′50″W
MN-44	Duluth Aerial Lift Bridge	Extant	Vertical-lift bridge	1905	1990	Lake Avenue	Duluth Ship Canal	Duluth	St. Louis	46°46′45″N 92°05′34″W
MN-45	Kern Truss Bridge	Dismantled	Bowstring arch truss	1873	1990	TR 190 (Ivywood Lane)	Le Sueur River	Skyline	Blue Earth	44°06′35″N 94°02′30″W
MN-53	Jay Cooke State Park, Pedestrian Suspension Bridge	Replaced	Suspension	1933	1990	Jay Cooke State Park trail	St. Louis River	Thomson	Carlton	46°39′13″N 92°22′14″W
MN-54	Elk River Bridge	Replaced	Reinforced concrete girder	1920	1992	Main Street	Elk River	Elk River	Sherburne	45°18′14″N 93°35′09″W
MN-55	Bridge No. 4900	Replaced	Parker truss	1930	1992	MN 16 / MN 43	Root River	Rushford	Fillmore	43°48′12″N 91°45′11″W
MN-56	Johnson Bridge	Replaced	Pratt truss	1904	1992		Redwood River	Seaforth	Redwood	44°28′59″N 95°18′38″W
MN-58	Brosseau Road Bridge	Replaced	Parker truss	1911	1992	County Road 694	Cloquet River	Burnett	St. Louis	46°53′47″N 92°30′54″W
MN-61	Selby Avenue Bridge	Replaced	Pratt truss	1890	1922	Selby Avenue	Milwaukee Road Short Line	Saint Paul	Ramsey	44°56′48″N 93°09′39″W
MN-71	Big Cottonwood River Bridge No. 246	Replaced	Pratt truss	1907	1993	Cottonwood Street	Big Cottonwood River	New Ulm	Brown	44°17′21″N 94°26′21″W
MN-72	Enloe Bridge No. 90021	Replaced	Pratt truss	1917	1993	CSAH 28	Red River of the North	Wolverton, Minnesota, and Abercrombie, North Dakota	Wilkin County, Minnesota, and Richland County, North Dakota	46°29′56″N 96°44′19″W
MN-73	Dodd Ford Bridge	Extant	Pratt truss	1901	1993	County Road 147	Blue Earth River	Amboy	Blue Earth	43°52′35″N 94°11′16″W
MN-74	Etter Bridge	Replaced	Parker truss	1915	1993	CSAH 68	Vermillion River	Hastings	Dakota	44°39′58″N 92°44′05″W
MN-75	Wabasha Street Bridge	Replaced	Cantilever	1889	1993	Wabasha Street	Mississippi River	Saint Paul	Ramsey	44°56′31″N 93°05′28″W
MN-76-A	Cloverleaf Interchange, Bridge No. 5820	Replaced	Reinforced concrete girder	1940	1994	MN 3	MN 55	Inver Grove Heights	Dakota	44°50′02″N 93°05′12″W
MN-77	Chicago, Milwaukee, St. Paul & Pacific Railroad, Overhead Highway Bridge	Demolished	Reinforced concrete rigid frame	1929	1994	US 71	Twin Cities and Western Railroad	Olivia	Renville	44°46′53″N 95°01′45″W
MN-78	Boundary Avenue Bridge	Replaced	Reinforced concrete closed-spandrel arch	1920	1994	Boundary Avenue	Kingsbury Creek	Proctor	St. Louis	46°44′10″N 92°13′02″W
MN-79	Bridge L-2182	Replaced	Reinforced concrete closed-spandrel arch	1920	1994	TR 1	Unnamed stream	Kanaranzi	Rock	43°31′19″N 96°04′01″W
MN-81	Bridge No. 4800	Replaced	Parker truss	1931	1994	MN 4	Minnesota River	Sleepy Eye and St. George	Brown and Nicollet	44°26′02″N 94°43′02″W
MN-82	Stone Arch Bridge		Stone arch					Minneapolis	Hennepin	
MN-84	Elwood Bridge	Replaced	Parker truss	1916	1994	County Road 696	Duluth, Missabe and Iron Range Railway	Proctor	St. Louis	46°45′51″N 92°15′12″W
MN-85	Bridge 4759	Replaced	Warren truss	1928	1995	MN 20	Cannon River	Cannon Falls	Goodhue	44°30′44″N 92°54′24″W
MN-86	Bridge 4666	Replaced	Parker truss	1928	1995	US 71 / MN 19	Minnesota River	North Redwood	Redwood	44°32′46″N 94°59′46″W
MN-87	Bridge No. 3585	Replaced	Steel hinged arch	1925	1995	MN 61	Gooseberry River	Two Harbors	Lake	47°08′36″N 91°28′06″W
MN-88	Bridge No. 92101		Warren truss	1905	1996	CSAH 373	Pike River	Embarrass	St. Louis	47°39′35″N 92°18′55″W
MN-91	Bridge No. 5930	Rehabilitated	Cantilever	1942	1997	MN 43/ WIS 54	Mississippi River main and north channels	Winona, Minnesota, and Buffalo, Wisconsin	Winona County, Minnesota, and Buffalo County, Wisconsin	44°03′27″N 91°38′23″W
MN-121	Arlington Avenue Bridge	Replaced	Prestressed concrete I-beam	1958	2013	Arlington Avenue	I-35E / US 10	Saint Paul	Ramsey	44°59′4″N 93°05′20″W
MN-122	Northern Pacific Railway 33rd Ave NE Bridge	Replaced	Warren truss	1926	2013	St. Anthony Parkway	BNSF Railway	Minneapolis	Hennepin	45°01′39″N 93°16′06″W
MN-123	Zumbrota Bridge	Extant	Thacher truss	1869	2015	West Avenue	Zumbro River north fork	Zumbrota	Goodhue	44°17′47″N 92°40′14″W
MN-124	Bridge No. 6679	Replaced	Steel rolled multi-beam	1949	2014	MN 76	Root River south fork	Sheldon	Houston	43°44′19″N 91°33′52″W
MN-125	Bridge No. 5722	Replaced	Box culvert	1936	2014	US 63/CSAH 1	Spring Valley Creek	Spring Valley	Fillmore	43°41′17″N 92°23′21″W
MN-126	Stone Bridge	Extant	Stone arch	1938	2015	CSAH 17	Grand Portage Creek	Grand Portage	Cook	47°57′49″N 89°41′01″W
MN-128	Bridge L4005	Extant	Pratt truss	1905	2016	Township Road 124	Riceford Creek	Black Hammer	Houston	43°36′58″N 91°42′54″W
MN-129	Gold Mine Bridge	Extant	Parker truss	1903	2016	County Road 17	Minnesota River	Delhi and Flora	Redwood and Renville	44°37′10″N 95°10′40″W
MN-130	Bridge L2194	Extant	Box culvert	1928	2016	200th Avenue	Unnamed stream	Magnolia	Rock	43°37′53″N 96°04′25″W
MN-131	Bridge L2257	Extant	Reinforced concrete closed-spandrel arch	1910	2016	Municipal Road 75 (Rock River Drive)	Unnamed stream	Luverne	Rock	43°38′50″N 96°11′39″W
MN-132	Itasca County Bridge	Extant	Reinforced concrete through arch	1917	2016	County Road 421	Swan River	Warba	Itasca	47°12′15″N 93°17′59″W
MN-133	Bridge L5245	Abandoned	Queen post truss	1900	2017	Township Road 187 (330th Avenue)	Okabena Creek	Okabena	Jackson	43°41′57″N 95°24′55″W
MN-134	West Bridge	Bypassed	Warren truss	1908	2016	County Road 116	Watonwan River	Madelia	Watonwan	44°02′40″N 94°25′54″W
MN-135	Bridge L4013	Extant	Stone arch	1915	2017	Township Road 126 (Rooster Valley Road)	Riceford Creek	Black Hammer	Houston	43°37′23″N 91°42′33″W
MN-136	Bridge No. 9065	Replaced	Prestressed concrete box beam	1959	2017	US 61 southbound	Big Trout Creek	Lamoille	Winona	43°59′47″N 91°27′38″W
WI-61	Prescott Bridge	Replaced	Vertical-lift bridge	1922	1989	US 10	St. Croix River	Point Douglas, Minnesota, and Prescott, Wisconsin	Washington County, Minnesota, and Pierce County, Wisconsin	44°44′56″N 92°48′17″W
