= Watonwan =

Watonwan may refer to:

- Watonwan County, Minnesota
- Watonwan River, in Minnesota
- USS Watonwan (ID-4296), a United States Navy cargo ship in commission in 1919
