= Watonwan County Courthouse =

- U.S. National Register of Historic Places
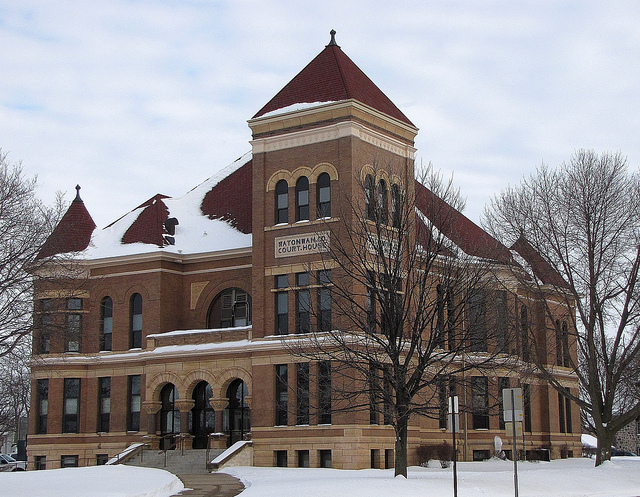
- The Watonwan County Courthouse from the northwest

- Location within Minnesota Location within the United States
- Interactive map showing the location of Watonwan County Courthouse
- Location: 710 2nd Avenue South, St. James, Minnesota
- Coordinates: 43°58′52.5″N 94°37′32.5″W
- Area: Less than one acre
- Built: 1895–96
- Built by: Otto Kleinschmidt
- Architect: H.C. Gerlach
- Architectural style: Romanesque Revival
- NRHP reference No.: 86003591
- Designated: January 7, 1987

The Watonwan County Courthouse in St. James, Minnesota, United States, is the seat of government for Watonwan County, in continual use since it was completed in 1896. It was listed on the National Register of Historic Places in 1987 for having state-level significance in the themes of architecture and politics/government. It was nominated for its exemplary Romanesque Revival architecture, its status as one of Minnesota's remaining monumental Victorian courthouses and as a local landmark, and its longstanding service as county seat.

== History ==
When Watonwan County was initially created in 1860, the city of Madelia was designated the county seat and a courthouse was built there around 1861. As St. James—a more centrally located community and a division headquarters for the Chicago, St. Paul, Minneapolis and Omaha Railway—grew, a heated battle for county seat status erupted between the two cities. When the original wood-frame courthouse burned down in 1872, Madelia officials hastily leased space in a recently completed commercial building—Flanders' Block—to avoid losing county seat status. However St. James interests petitioned for a vote on the matter and in 1874 voters approved the move. The first courthouse in St. James was a wood-frame structure built on land donated by the railroad. A new courthouse, the present building, was designed by Mankato architect H.C. Gerlach and built by Mankato contractor Otto Kleinschmidt from 1895 to 1896. The building served as a show of government strength and traditional values in a city that was only 25 years old. It is monumental in size and design, and a county-wide survey of historic properties identified it as one of the most architecturally significant Victorian buildings in the county.

== See also ==
- List of county courthouses in Minnesota
- National Register of Historic Places listings in Watonwan County, Minnesota
