= Riceford =

Riceford may refer to:

- Riceford, Minnesota, an unincorporated community
- Riceford Creek, a stream in Minnesota
