= Dodd Ford Bridge =

- U.S. National Register of Historic Places
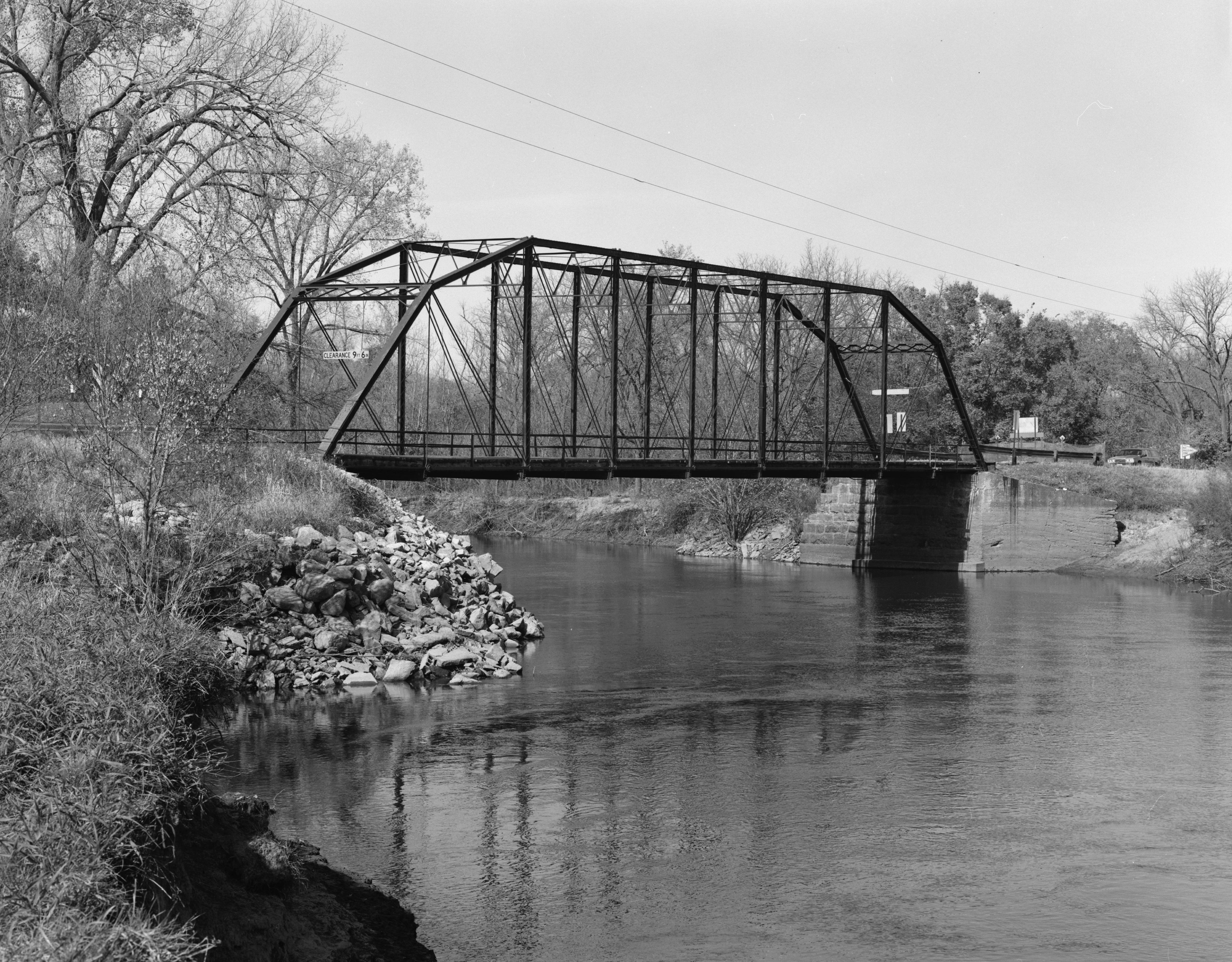
- Dodd Ford Bridge in 1993

- Location within Minnesota Location within the United States
- Location: Co. Hwy. 147 over Blue Earth River, near Amboy, Minnesota
- Coordinates: 43°52′34.81″N 94°11′16.34″W
- Built: 1901
- Architectural style: Pratt truss bridge
- NRHP reference No.: 09001070
- Added to NRHP: December 9, 2009

The Dodd Ford Bridge is a bridge spanning the Blue Earth River about 1 mile (2 km) southwest of Amboy, Minnesota, in Blue Earth County, Minnesota.

The bridge is a steel, pin-connected, nine-panel, overhead, Pratt-truss highway bridge. Constructed in 1901, it is among the state's earliest remaining examples of the overhead Pratt type. The bridge also is significant for its association with Lawrence Henry Johnson, a prominent Minnesota bridge builder of the late nineteenth and early twentieth century. This bridge is one of only two authenticated surviving examples of Johnson's work.

== Construction ==
Although Amboy stood only about one-half mile east of the river, there was no nearby highway bridge. A road did enter Amboy from the west, but it crossed the river at a shallows known as Dodd Ford, which apparently was often an obstacle to vehicular traffic. In the fall of 1900 the Blue Earth County Board of Commissioners decided to have a bridge built at that location. The official county surveyor N. F. Brooks prepared the preliminary design documents.

The local contracting firm of Carlstrom Brothers built the two stone piers. At that time bridge building in Minnesota was dominated by six Minneapolis companies: Gilette Herzog Manufacturing Company (a subsidiary of the American Bridge Company), William S. Hewett and Company, Minneapolis Bridge and Iron Company, L. H. Johnson, M. A. Adams Bridge Company, and Hewett Bridge Company. Although the last two firms did not bid on this project, the others did and their proposals were within a few hundred dollars of each other, ranging from $2,948 by L. H. Johnson to $3320 by the Minneapolis Bridge and Iron Company. The contract went to the lowest bidder, L. H. Johnson.

As the contractor, Johnson undoubtedly turned to an established bridge fabrication shop, possibly the Wisconsin Bridge and Iron Company, with which he had been associated earlier. Completion was required by June 1, 1901, and he apparently delivered the bridge on schedule for he was paid in full on June 6.

== Significance ==
The Dodd Ford Bridge is one of only two surviving bridges known to have been built by Johnson while he operated as a contractor under his own name. In its design and engineering it is a conventional, pin-connected, nine-panel, 148.5-foot-long (45.3 m), steel truss of the overhead Pratt variety. During the late nineteenth and early twentieth centuries, this general type of truss was commonly used throughout the United States for highway crossings of approximately 90 to 150 feet (27 to 46 m) in length. Reflecting the prevailing bridge-engineering practices of its time, this bridge has relatively light construction by later automobile-inspired standards. The bridge employs laced channel sections for vertical compression members, paired eyebars for horizontal tension members and lower chord members, angle sections for overhead sway bracing and portal bracing, and crossed eyebars for top-lateral and bottom-lateral bracing. The bridge further evokes its period by virtue of its narrow 15-foot-wide (4.6 m) roadway with a plank deck supported on wood stringers. Such design was later prohibited by the Minnesota Highway Commission (established in 1905). The Commission advocated a 16-foot (4.9 m) minimum roadway, steel stringers, and preferred a reinforced-concrete deck.

== Status ==
The Dodd Ford Bridge survived for most of its life with minimal alterations. The Blue Earth County Highway Department repaired some cracking of the north abutment during the 1970s and reinforced, by welding and bracing, a few collision-damaged members of the east web during the 1980s. In April 1993, however, the bridge suffered severe substructural damage when high water undermined a portion of the south abutment and swept away the southeast wing wall. The county immediately closed the structure and made plans for its replacement.

The bridge was closed to heavy traffic for thirty years before it was closed to all traffic in May 2009. It was added to the National Register of Historic Places in December 2009. The Preservation Alliance of Minnesota placed it on its 2010 list of the 10 Most Endangered Historic Places.

The Dodd Ford Bridge was rehabilitated, and reopened to traffic the summer 2016. Since the original abutments were in poor condition, the truss, or metal, portion of the bridge was lifted off the original abutments and placed on temporary supports while the contractor rebuilt new abutments. New I-beams were placed on the new abutments and the historic truss was placed on top. The new supports will help the over 100-year-old bridge carry modern traffic loads, while maintaining its historic character.

== See also ==
- List of bridges documented by the Historic American Engineering Record in Minnesota
