= West Bridge (Madelia, Minnesota) =

- U.S. National Register of Historic Places
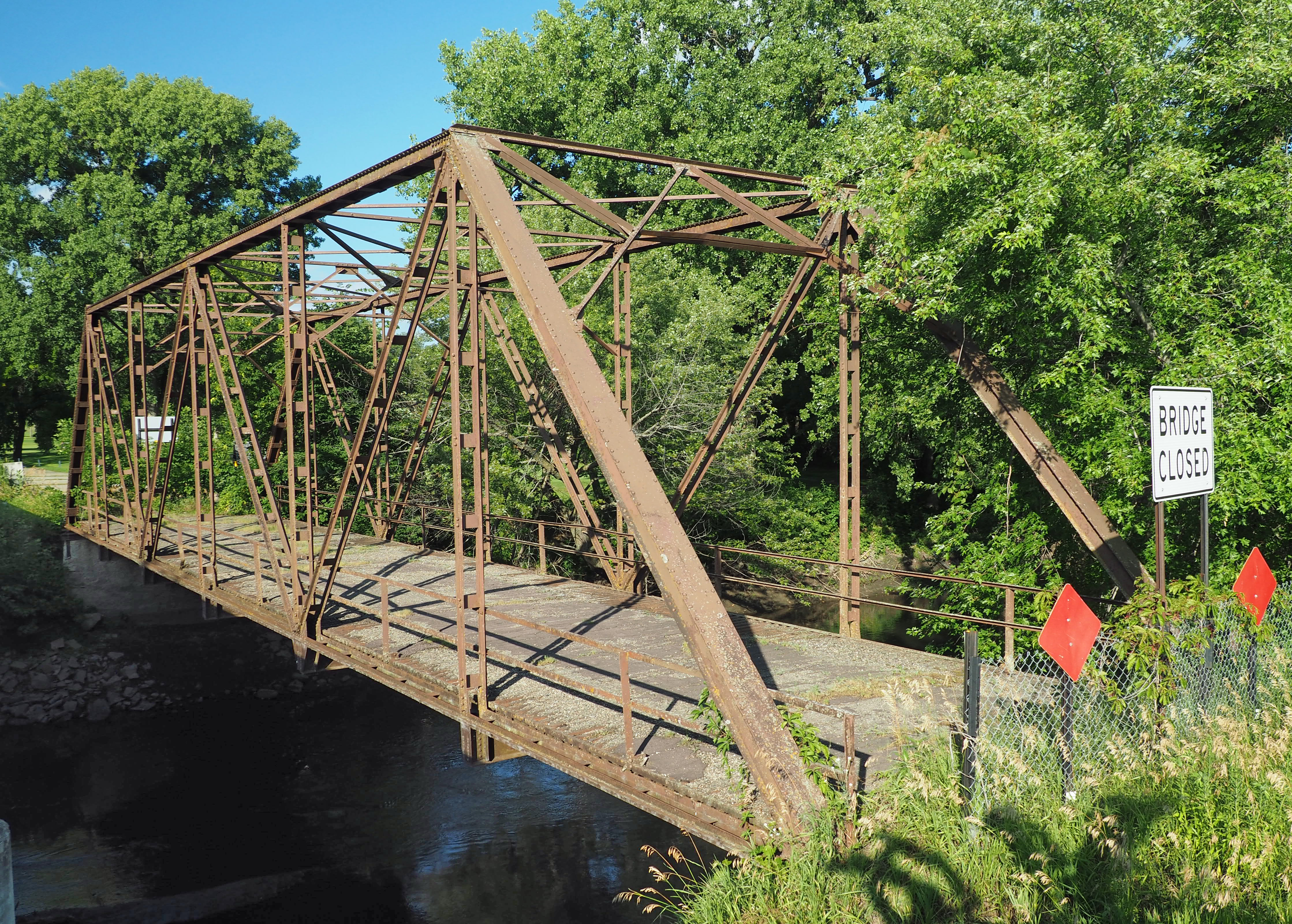
- West Bridge viewed from the northwest

- Location within Minnesota Location within the United States
- Location: Adjacent to County Road 116 over the Watonwan River, Madelia, Minnesota
- Coordinates: 44°2′40″N 94°25′54.5″W
- Area: Less than one acre
- Built: 1908
- Architect: Commodore P. Jones
- Architectural style: Warren through truss
- MPS: Iron and Steel Bridges in Minnesota MPS
- NRHP reference No.: 13000883
- Designated: December 3, 2013

West Bridge, also designated Bridge 6527, is a historic truss bridge over the Watonwan River in Madelia, Minnesota, United States. It was listed on the National Register of Historic Places in 2013 for its state-level significance in the theme of transportation. It was nominated for being the only surviving work of seminal Minnesota bridge builder Commodore P. Jones, and for its early use of riveted joints.

== Description ==
The West Bridge is a Warren through truss bridge. Built in 1908, it is the earliest bridge of its type remaining in Minnesota. It also used riveted connections before that was the standard in the state.

The West Bridge was converted to a pedestrian bridge in 1990, with vehicular traffic routed over a new bridge immediately adjacent to the old one. It was closed to all use due to being unsafe to walk across.

The bridge was added to the National Register of Historic Places in 2013 after the Watonwan County Historical Society received a grant to document the origins of the bridge.

In 2017, Watonwan County received an Minnesota Department of Transportation grant for $108,000 to pay for restoration research and design to make the bridge safe for pedestrians and cyclists.

== See also ==
- List of bridges documented by the Historic American Engineering Record in Minnesota
- National Register of Historic Places listings in Watonwan County, Minnesota
