= Tom Hagedorn =

American politician

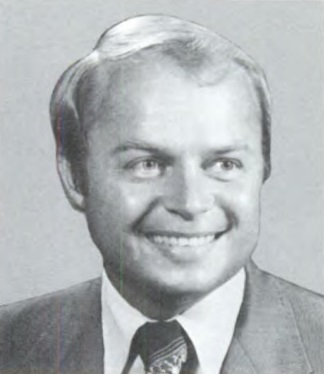

Member of the U.S. House of Representatives from Minnesota's 2nd district
- In office January 3, 1975 – January 3, 1983
- Preceded by: Ancher Nelsen
- Succeeded by: Vin Weber

Member of the Minnesota House of Representatives
- In office January 5, 1971 – January 3, 1975
- Preceded by: Mac Hegstrom
- Succeeded by: Darrel Peterson
- Constituency: District 18B (1971–1973); District 27B (1973–1975)

Personal details
- Born: Thomas Michael Hagedorn; November 27, 1943 (age 82) Blue Earth, Minnesota, U.S.
- Party: Republican
- Spouse: Kathleen Middlestadt
- Children: 3, including Jim (son)

Thomas Michael Hagedorn (born November 27, 1943) is an American politician who served in the United States House of Representatives as a Republican from Minnesota.

== Early life and education ==
He was born in Blue Earth, Faribault County, Minnesota, on November 27, 1943, and graduated from the Blue Earth High School in 1961.

== Career ==
Hagedorn served in the United States Navy in 1961. After returning to Minnesota, he engaged in grain and livestock farming in Watonwan County. He served as a member of the Minnesota House of Representatives from 1971 to 1975 and was a delegate to the Minnesota State and County Republican conventions in 1968 and 1972, and the national Republican conventions in 1976 and 1980. He was elected as a Republican to represent Minnesota's 2nd congressional district in the 94th, 95th, 96th, and 97th congresses, serving from January 3, 1975, to January 3, 1983. He was an unsuccessful candidate for reelection to represent Minnesota's 1st congressional district in the 98th congress in 1982. Hagedorn was succeeded in the House by author, businessman, and musician Tim Penny.

== Family ==
Hagedorn's son Jim Hagedorn was elected to Congress in 2018 from Minnesota's 1st congressional district, which contained much of the same territory Tom Hagedorn had represented.

U.S. House of Representatives
Preceded by Ancher Nelsen	Member of the U.S. House of Representatives from Minnesota's 2nd congressional district 1975–1983	Succeeded by Vin Weber
U.S. order of precedence (ceremonial)
Preceded by Jeff Denham as Former U.S. Representative	Order of precedence of the United States as Former U.S. Representative	Succeeded by David Minge as Former U.S. Representative
