= Flanders' Block =

Historic place in Minnesota, United States

- U.S. National Register of Historic Places
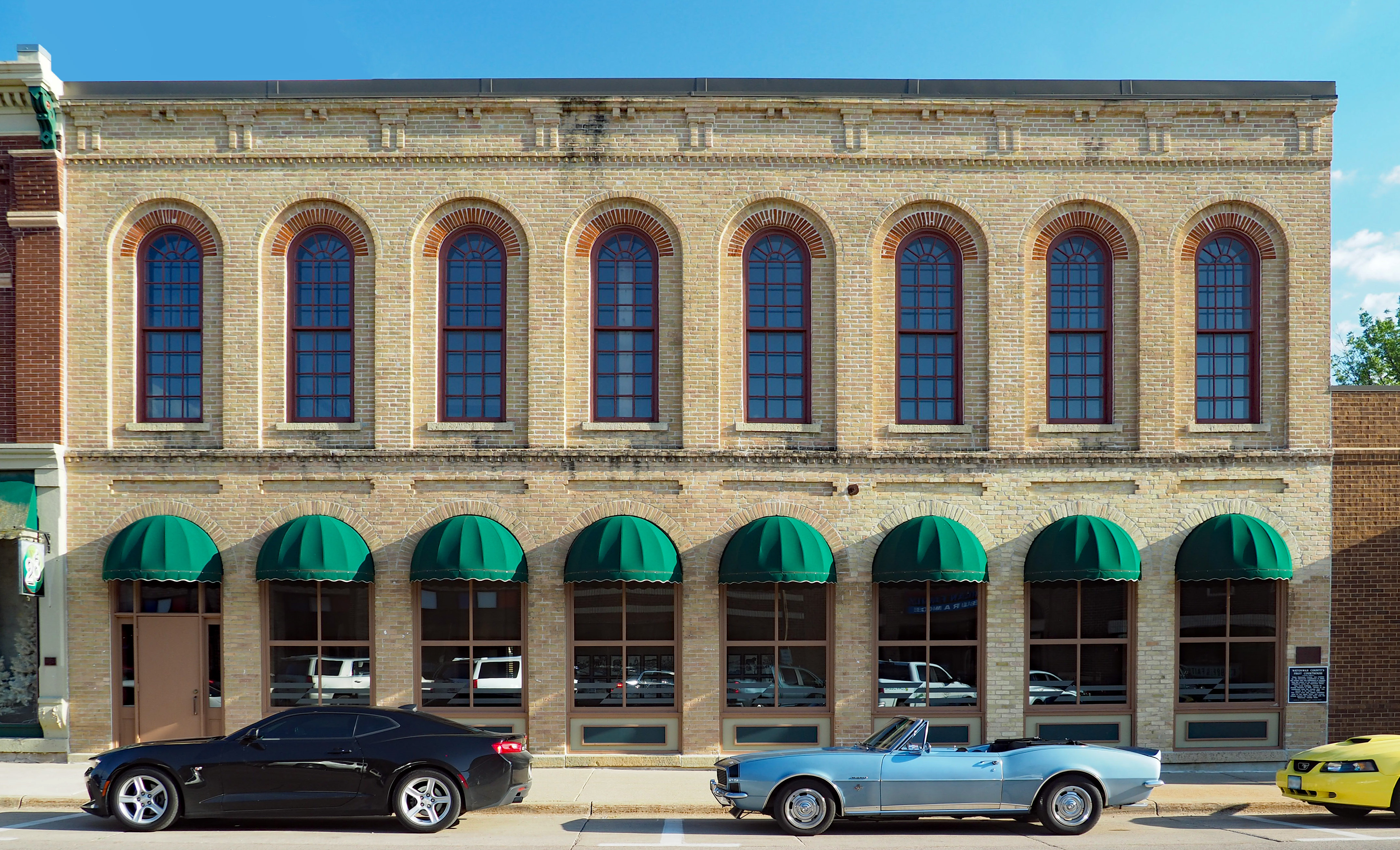
- Flanders' Block from the north

- Location within Minnesota Location within the United States
- Interactive map showing the location of Flanders Block
- Location: 30 West Main Street, Madelia, Minnesota
- Coordinates: 44°3′2.3″N 94°25′4″W
- Area: Less than one acre
- Built: 1872
- Architectural style: Italianate
- NRHP reference No.: 84001714
- Designated: March 8, 1984

Flanders' Block is a historic commercial building in Madelia, Minnesota, United States, built in 1872. From 1872 to 1878 it served as the county seat building of Watonwan County, housing the courthouse, offices, and jail. Flanders' Block was listed on the National Register of Historic Places in 1984 for its local significance in the theme of politics/government. It was nominated for its associations with the early development of Watonwan County's government.

== Description ==
Flanders' Block has eight arched windows on the second level. It was originally built with five arched windows on the main level and a conventional storefront in the remaining three bays. At the time of its National Register nomination, the street facades were covered by later remodelings, but the owner subsequently removed the sheathing and restored the original storefront.

== History ==
The city of Madelia was platted in 1857 along the Watonwan River. Watonwan County was established in 1860 and its first county seat was in Madelia. The original courthouse was a wood frame structure, but it was destroyed in a fire. By that time St. James—a more centrally located community and a division headquarters for the Chicago, St. Paul, Minneapolis and Omaha Railway—was agitating to become the county seat. Fearful that the fire would provide a reason to relocate the government, Madelia officials acted quickly to secure a new location within their community. Joseph Flanders, the county's first registrar of deeds, had just built the two-story building on Main Street. He leased the upper floor for a courtroom, part of the first floor for county offices, and part of the basement for the jail. The Watonwan County Bank occupied the rest of the first floor.

The local newspaper was critical of this arrangement. An editorial that appeared in the Madelia Times in 1875 said:

One of the evidences of the dictatorial spirit with which J. Flanders attempts to run this county, subservient to his arbitrary will, is evidenced by the manner in which he put the county offices out of possession of the rooms, whose use belongs to the county, and to no one else, for county purposes under a lease of ten years, or so long as it may be needed for said purposes, by the county seat remaining at this place. It is a shame and a disgrace that our county officers should be even asked to vacate the apartments provided for them by the said lease, which was accepted by the county board and put on record, and be moved into another room, which is not well lighted, to suit the caprice of one dictating official, simply that he may use the room which rightfully belongs to the county, to accomplish selfish ends. Still worse than this, however, a part of the officers were not even requested to move, but without being consulted and in their absence, their desks, books and papers were removed.

Madelia was unable to hold on to county seat status, however, and in 1878 the government was moved to St. James. In later years, Flanders' Block was home to an International Order of Odd Fellows lodge upstairs, and the main floor has housed various commercial establishments.

== See also ==
- National Register of Historic Places listings in Watonwan County, Minnesota
