= Carl G. Olson =

American politician (1904–1965)

Carl G. Olson (May 14, 1904 – May 22, 1965) was an American farmer and politician.

Olson was born in St. James, Minnesota, went to the Minnesota public schools, and to the University of Minnesota School of Agriculture. He lived in St. James, Minnesota with his wife and family and was a farmer and a director of the Citizens State Bank of St. James. Olson served on the St. James School Board and in the Minnesota House of Representatives from 1955 to 1958.
