= Otto T. Bang =

American businessman and politician

Member of the Minnesota Senate from the 39th district
- In office January 2, 1973 – January 4, 1983
- Preceded by: Edward J. Gearty
- Succeeded by: Conrado Vega

Personal details
- Born: Otto Theodore Bang Jr. September 15, 1931 Madelia, Minnesota, U.S.
- Died: December 29, 2008 (aged 77) Minneapolis, Minnesota, U.S.
- Party: Republican
- Spouse: Mary
- Education: University of Minnesota (BA)

Otto Theodore Bang Jr. (September 15, 1931 – December 29, 2008) was an American businessman and politician.

Bang was born in Madelia, Watonwan County, Minnesota. He graduated from Mayville High School in Mayville, North Dakota and received his bachelor's degree from the University of Minnesota. Bang lived in Edina, Minnesota with his wife and family and was involved in the insurance business. Bang served in the Minnesota House of Representatives from 1963 to 1973 and in the Minnesota Senate from 1973 to 1983. He was a Republican. Bang died on December 29, 2008, at the Hennepin County Medical Center in Minneapolis, Minnesota after suffering a head injury in an automobile accident in Hopkins, Minnesota on December 21, 2008.
