= Grand Opera House (St. James, Minnesota) =

- U.S. National Register of Historic Places
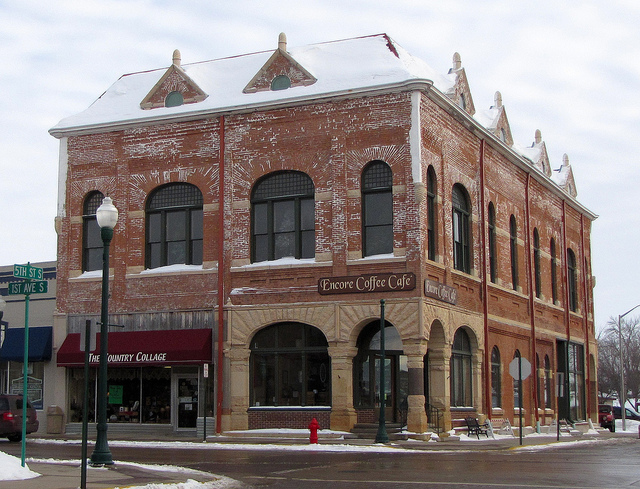
- The Grand Opera House from the northwest

- Location within Minnesota Location within the United States
- Location: 502 1st Avenue South, St. James, Minnesota
- Coordinates: 43°58′53″N 94°37′45″W
- Area: Less than one acre
- Built: 1891–92
- Built by: John S. Bumby
- Architectural style: Queen Anne
- NRHP reference No.: 09001152
- Added to NRHP: December 23, 2009

The Grand Opera House, also known as the St. James Opera House, is a historic theater building in St. James, Minnesota, United States, completed in 1892. It was listed on the National Register of Historic Places in 2009 for its local significance in the theme of entertainment/recreation. It was nominated for being the city's principal performance venue from 1892 to 1921, bringing fine performing arts like theater, music, and comedy to a modest agricultural center, as well hosting local events. Like many of the hundreds of opera houses built across the Midwestern United States from 1880 to 1910, the St. James opera house contains its auditorium on the upper floor, with retail space on the ground floor as a source of rental income.

== See also ==
- National Register of Historic Places listings in Watonwan County, Minnesota
