= Odin, Minnesota =

City in Minnesota, United States

Odin
- City
- Location of Odin, Minnesota
- Coordinates: 43°52′02″N 94°44′34″W
- Country: United States
- State: Minnesota
- County: Watonwan

Government
  - Type: Mayor - Council
  - Mayor: Shilo Sydorowicz

Area
  - Total: 0.37 sq mi (0.96 km^{2})
  - Land: 0.37 sq mi (0.96 km^{2})
  - Water: 0 sq mi (0.00 km^{2})
- Elevation: 1,214 ft (370 m)

Population (2020)
  - Total: 123
  - Density: 333/sq mi (128.4/km^{2})
- Time zone: UTC-6 (CST)
  - Summer (DST): UTC-5 (CDT)
- ZIP code: 56160
- Area code: 507
- FIPS code: 27-48094
- GNIS feature ID: 2395300

Odin (/ˈoʊdɪn/ OH-din) is a city in Watonwan County, Minnesota, United States, along the South Fork of the Watonwan River. The population was 123 at the 2020 census.

== History ==
Odin was platted in 1899. The city was named after Odin, Illinois. Odin was incorporated in 1902.

Notable People

U.S. Diplomat Bruce Laingen

== Geography ==
According to the United States Census Bureau, the city has a total area of 0.37 square miles (0.96 km^{2}), all land.

== Government ==
Odin is located within Minnesota's 1st congressional district, represented by Republican, Brad Finstad.

== Demographics ==
Historical population
Census	Pop.	Note	%±
1910	139		—
1920	195		40.3%
1930	194		−0.5%
1940	198		2.1%
1950	208		5.1%
1960	184		−11.5%
1970	166		−9.8%
1980	134		−19.3%
1990	102		−23.9%
2000	125		22.5%
2010	106		−15.2%
2020	123		16.0%
U.S. Decennial Census; 2020 Census

=== 2010 census ===
As of the census of 2010, there were 106 people, 55 households, and 27 families residing in the city. The population density was 286.5 inhabitants per square mile (110.6/km^{2}). There were 64 housing units at an average density of 173.0 per square mile (66.8/km^{2}). The racial makeup of the city was 96.2% White and 3.8% Asian. Hispanic or Latino of any race were 2.8% of the population.

There were 55 households, of which 21.8% had children under the age of 18 living with them, 43.6% were married couples living together, 1.8% had a female householder with no husband present, 3.6% had a male householder with no wife present, and 50.9% were non-families. 49.1% of all households were made up of individuals, and 29.1% had someone living alone who was 65 years of age or older. The average household size was 1.93 and the average family size was 2.81.

The median age in the city was 47 years. 22.6% of residents were under the age of 18; 3.8% were between the ages of 18 and 24; 21.7% were from 25 to 44; 21.6% were from 45 to 64; and 30.2% were 65 years of age or older. The gender makeup of the city was 50.9% male and 49.1% female.

=== 2000 census ===
As of the census of 2000, there were 125 people, 62 households, and 36 families residing in the city. The population density was 344.6 inhabitants per square mile (133.1/km^{2}). There were 66 housing units at an average density of 182.0 per square mile (70.3/km^{2}). The racial makeup of the city was 100.00% White.

There were 62 households, out of which 21.0% had children under the age of 18 living with them, 51.6% were married couples living together, 6.5% had a female householder with no husband present, and 41.9% were non-families. 40.3% of all households were made up of individuals, and 24.2% had someone living alone who was 65 years of age or older. The average household size was 2.02 and the average family size was 2.72.

In the city, the population was spread out, with 22.4% under the age of 18, 4.0% from 18 to 24, 19.2% from 25 to 44, 19.2% from 45 to 64, and 35.2% who were 65 years of age or older. The median age was 48 years. For every 100 females, there were 66.7 males. For every 100 females age 18 and over, there were 79.6 males.

The median income for a household in the city was $25,625, and the median income for a family was $36,875. Males had a median income of $25,000 versus $26,250 for females. The per capita income for the city was $16,118. There were 10.8% of families and 16.8% of the population living below the poverty line, including 37.5% of under eighteens and 10.8% of those over 64.
