= Riceford, Minnesota =

Unincorporated community in Minnesota, United States

Riceford
- Unincorporated community
- Location within Minnesota Location within the United States
- Coordinates: 43°34′34″N 91°43′37″W
- Country: United States
- State: Minnesota
- County: Houston
- Elevation: 1,014 ft (309 m)
- Time zone: UTC-6 (Central (CST))
  - Summer (DST): UTC-5 (CDT)
- Area code: 507
- GNIS feature ID: 650057

Riceford is an unincorporated community in Houston County, in the U.S. state of Minnesota.

== History ==
A post office was established at Riceford in 1855, and remained in operation until it was discontinued in 1905. The community was named for Henry Mower Rice, a Minnesota Territory politician who forded Riceford Creek at this place in the 1850s.
