= Okabena Creek =

- Mouth of the Okabena Creek

Location
- Country: United States
- State: Minnesota
- County: Jackson County, Nobles County

Physical characteristics
- Source
  - location: Reading, Minnesota
  - coordinates: 43.6882973°N 95.6858447°W
- Mouth
  - location: Okabena, Minnesota
  - coordinates: 43°44′18″N 95°15′46″W
- Length: 40-mile-long (64 km)

Basin features
- River system: Des Moines River

Okabena Creek is a 40-mile-long (64 km) waterway in southern Minnesota. It is a tributary, via the short Diversion Creek, of Heron Lake, the outlet of which flows to the Des Moines River. Okabena Creek begins in Worthington, Minnesota, connecting by a ditch to the outlet of Okabena Lake, then flows northeast past the towns of Brewster and Okabena to the Heron Lake/South Heron Lake system.

The name Okabena comes from Hoḳábena, a Dakota language term meaning "Heron hatching place". It is also the traditional Dakota name of nearby Heron Lake.

== See also ==
- List of rivers of Minnesota
