= Carl L. Johnson =

American politician, railroad employee, and farmer

Carl L. Johnson (September 12, 1898 – March 23, 1958) was an American politician, railroad employee, and farmer.

Johnsom was born in St. James, Minnesota, and graduated from St. James High School. He lived in St. James, Minnesota, with his wife and family. Johnson was a farmer and worked for the Omaha Railroad. Johnson served in the Minnesota House of Representatives in 1933 and 1934. He died in Saint Paul, Minnesota, and his funeral was in St. James, Minnesota.
