= High Bridge (St. Paul) =

Bridge in St. Paul, Minnesota

Smith Avenue High Bridge
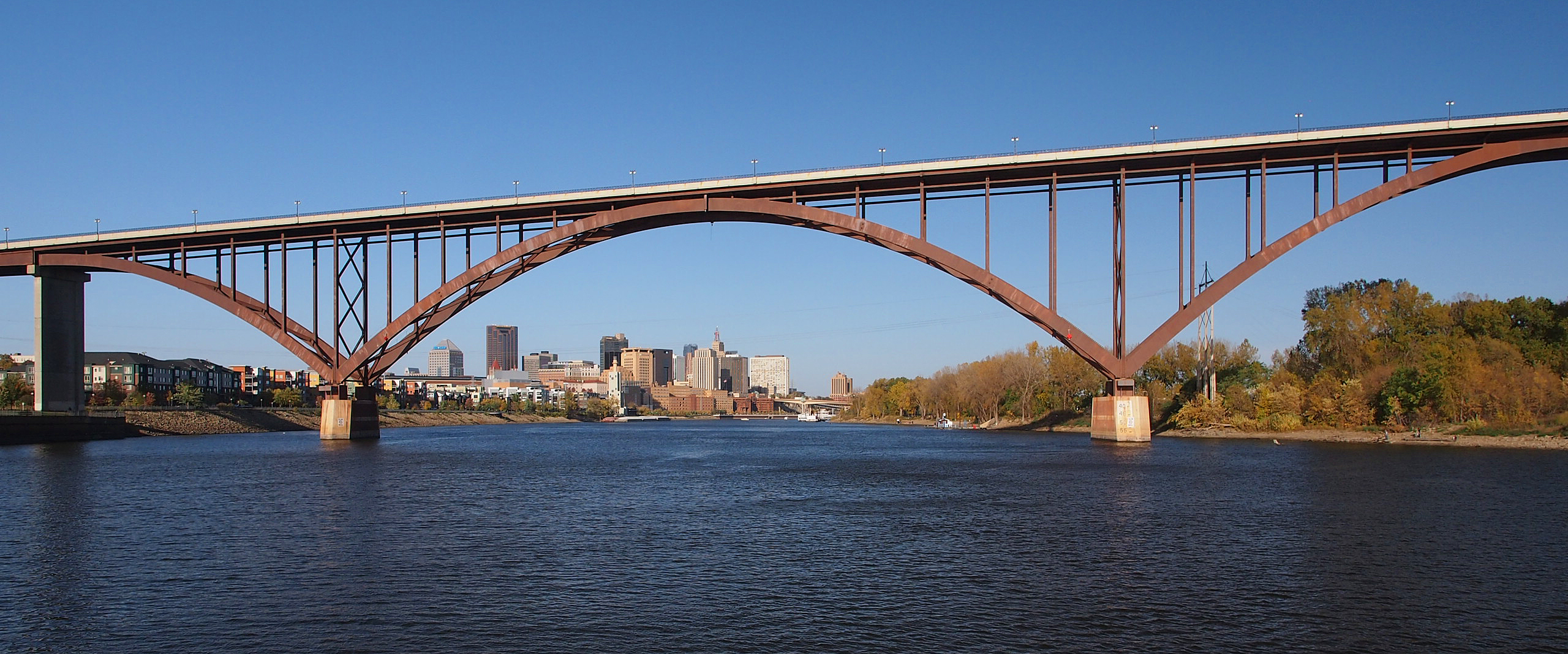
- The High Bridge with downtown Saint Paul in the background
- Coordinates: 44°55′59″N 93°06′16″W
- Carries: Two lanes of MN 149
- Crosses: Mississippi River
- Locale: Saint Paul, Minnesota
- Maintained by: Minnesota Department of Transportation
- ID number: 62090

Characteristics
- Design: Inverted arch and two half-arches for the main span; eight plate girder spans on the north side
- Total length: 2,770 ft (840 m)
- Width: 54 ft (16 m)
- Height: 160 ft (49 m) (deck)
- Longest span: 520 ft (160 m)
- Clearance below: 149 ft (45 m)

History
- Opened: July 1987

The Smith Avenue High Bridge or the High Bridge is an inverted arch bridge that carries Minnesota State Highway 149 and Smith Avenue over the Mississippi River in Saint Paul, Minnesota, United States. It was built and opened in 1987 at a cost of $20 million. The bridge carries two lanes of street traffic over the river and is the highest bridge in St. Paul, with a deck height of 160 ft (49 m) and a clearance below of 149 ft (45 m).

The current bridge replaced a 2,770-foot-long (840 m) iron Warren deck truss bridge constructed in 1889. In 1904 the original bridge was partially destroyed by a tornado or severe storm and the southernmost five spans had to be rebuilt. With modest alterations it served for nearly a century, but in 1977 an inspection found irreparable structural deficiencies. The Minnesota Department of Transportation enacted a weight restriction on the bridge until it was closed in 1984 and demolished the following year. The ornamental ironwork on the replacement was built using iron from the old bridge. The first bridge had been listed on the National Register of Historic Places in 1981 and was delisted in 1988.

In February 2008, City Pages, a weekly publication in the Twin Cities, published a feature about the long history of suicide at the bridge. The article included testimony of a survivor who leapt from the bridge.

The bridge closed September 2017 for a redecking project. It reopened to traffic the afternoon of November 21, 2018.

== Gallery ==
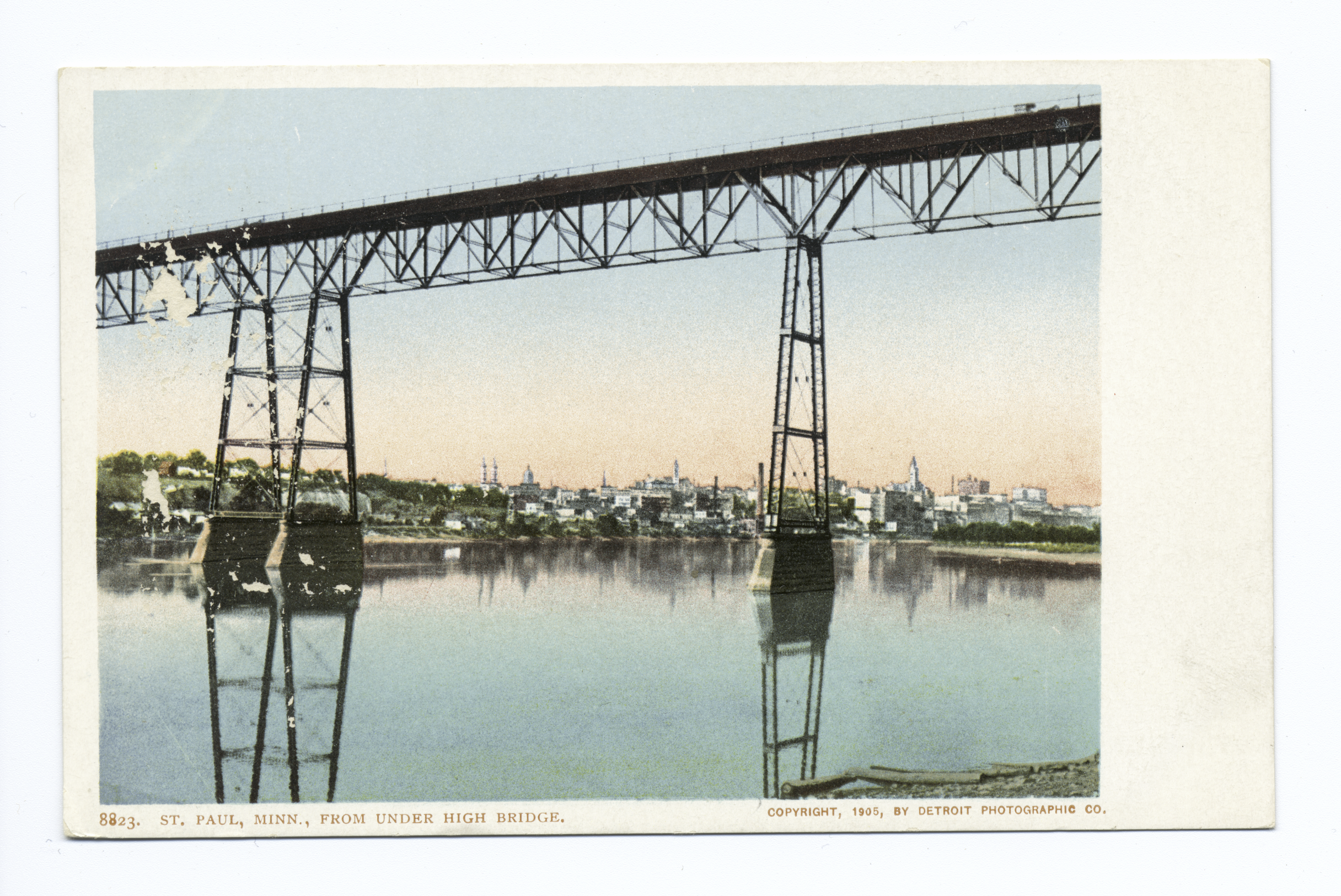
Original High Bridge circa 1900

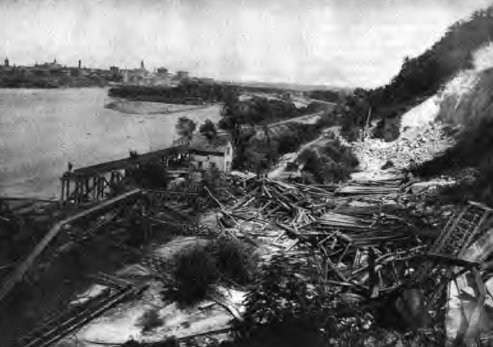
Wreck of the High Bridge in the storm of 1904

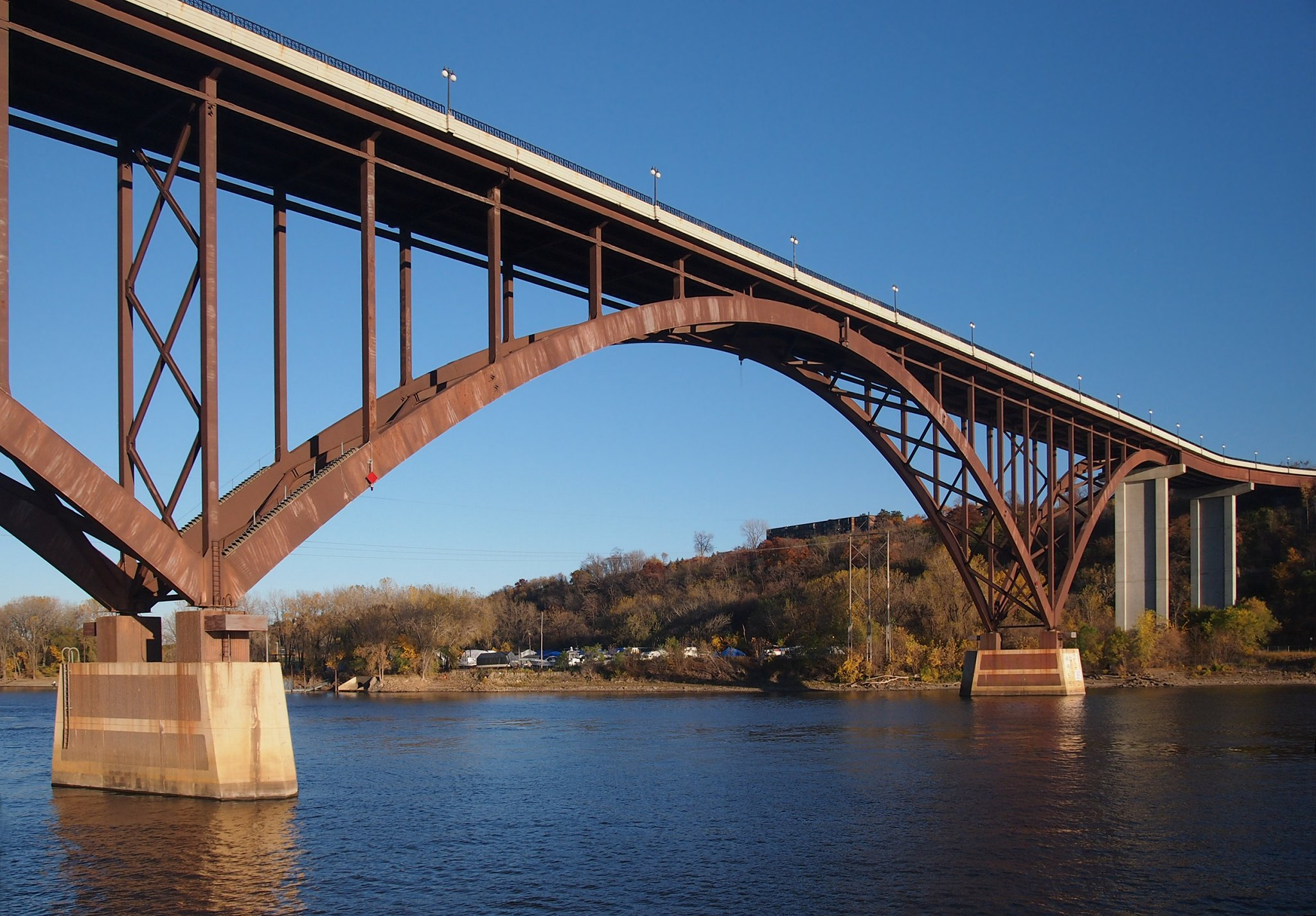
Current High Bridge from the northwest

== See also ==
- List of bridges documented by the Historic American Engineering Record in Minnesota
- List of crossings of the Upper Mississippi River
