= USS Watonwan =

Cargo ship of the United States Navy

History

United States
- Name: USS Watonwan
- Namesake: The Watonwan River in Minnesota (previous name retained)
- Builder: Merchant Shipbuilding Corporation, Bristol, Pennsylvania
- Launched: 14 August 1918
- Completed: 1918
- Commissioned: 4 February 1919
- Decommissioned: 14 May 1919
- Stricken: 14 May 1919
- Fate: Returned to United States Shipping Board 14 May 1919; Laid up 1923; Broken up 1930
- Notes: Built for United States Shipping Board as SS Watonwan in 1918; in Shipping Board custody as SS Watonwan 1919-1931.

General characteristics
- Type: Design 1025 ship
- Displacement: 12,200 tons
- Length: 417 ft 9.5 in (127.343 m)
- Beam: 54 ft 2 in (16.51 m)
- Draft: 25 ft 6 in (7.77 m) mean
- Depth: 32 ft 10 in (10.01 m)
- Propulsion: Steam, one screw
- Speed: 8.9 knots
- Complement: 70
- Armament: 1 × 4-inch (102-millimeter) gun; 1 × 3-inch (76.2 millimeter) gun

USS Watonwan (ID-4296) was a United States Navy cargo ship in commission in 1919.

Watonwan was a steel-hulled, single-screw freighter built for the United States Shipping Board in 1918 at Bristol, Pennsylvania, by the Merchant Shipbuilding Corporation. In 1919 she was taken over by the U.S. Navy for operation by the Naval Overseas Transportation Service (NOTS). Assigned Identification Number (Id. No.) 4296, she was placed in commission at Philadelphia, Pennsylvania, on 4 February 1919.

After loading 7,087 tons of flour, Watonwan departed Philadelphia on 19 February 1919, bound for the British Isles, and arrived in Falmouth, England, on 5 March 1919. After discharging a part of her cargo there, she departed Falmouth on 12 March 1919 and called at Plymouth, England, and Gibraltar before departing Gibraltar on 22 March 1919 for Italy. Reaching Genoa on 26 March 1919, she discharged the last of her cargo of flour there, loaded 1,250 tons of stone ballast, and sailed via Gibraltar for the United States.

Watonwan tarried briefly at Norfolk, Virginia, arriving on 26 April 1919 and departing on 27 April 1919, before moving on to New Orleans, Louisiana. She arrived there on 8 May 1919 and was decommissioned on 14 May 1919. She was simultaneously struck from the Navy List and returned to the Shipping Board. Laid up in 1923, Watonwan was broken up in 1930.
