= Kern Bridge =

- U.S. National Register of Historic Places
- Kern Bridge in 2019

- Location within Minnesota Location within the United States
- Nearest city: Skyline, Minnesota
- Coordinates: 44°6′35″N 94°2′30″W
- Area: Less than one acre
- Built: 1873
- Architect: Wrought Iron Bridge Company
- Architectural style: Bowstring through truss
- MPS: Blue Earth County MRA
- NRHP reference No.: 80001950
- Added to NRHP: July 28, 1980

Kern Bridge or Yaeger Bridge crossed the Le Sueur River in Blue Earth County in the U.S. state of Minnesota. It was built in 1873 using a bowstring through truss design by the Wrought Iron Bridge Company. It was 183.5 feet (56 m) long and carried a local road. It was listed on the National Register of Historic Places in 1980 as Minnesota's only bowstring arch truss bridge and oldest road bridge still in use. However, it was closed to vehicle traffic in 1991.

In 2019, the Minnesota Department of Transportation (MnDOT) announced plans to dismantle the bridge and store it for eventual reuse elsewhere. According to the department's website, it has been removed and is available for suitable relocation.

Less than 5 miles (8 km) downstream from its original site, the historic 1873 Kern Bridge has found a new home connecting the Land of Memories Park to Sibley Park in Mankato. Mankato will receive federal funding (80 percent of cost) to relocate and rehabilitate the bridge.

According to MnDOT, "Although Mankato is urban, the future Kern Bridge setting is wooded, crosses a large river, and is a similar context to the original bridge site." Pedestrians and bicyclists will access the bridge through the existing trail system. "The bridge will be seen from the north via a scenic overlook and from the south via U.S. Highway 169. Though the proposal included use of extensive approach spans to meet the river’s width," MnDOT says, "the choice of a streamlined girder will allow the arch to be visually prominent, an important consideration in re-listing the bridge" on the National Register of Historic Places.

== See also ==
- List of bridges documented by the Historic American Engineering Record in Minnesota
