= St. James, Minnesota =

City in Minnesota, United States

- City
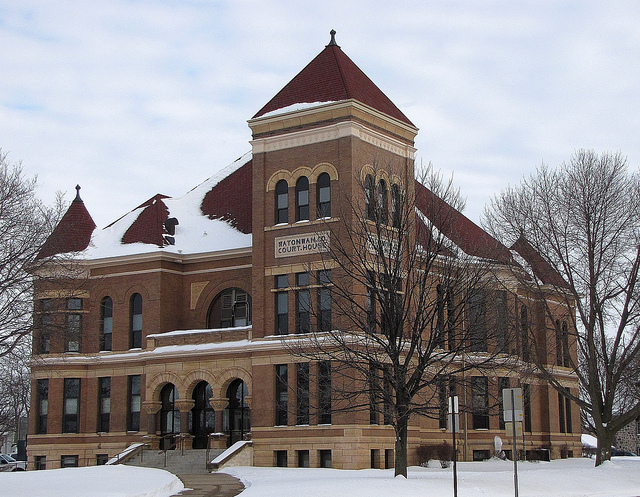
- The Watonwan County Courthouse in St. James

- Location of St. James within Watonwan County and state of Minnesota
- Coordinates: 43°59′00″N 94°37′30″W
- Country: United States
- State: Minnesota
- County: Watonwan

Government
  - Type: Mayor - Council
  - Mayor: Chris Whitehead

Area
  - Total: 2.36 sq mi (6.10 km^{2})
  - Land: 2.33 sq mi (6.04 km^{2})
  - Water: 0.023 sq mi (0.06 km^{2})
- Elevation: 1,073 ft (327 m)

Population (2020)
  - Total: 4,793
  - Density: 2,054.7/sq mi (793.34/km^{2})
- Time zone: UTC-6 (CST)
  - Summer (DST): UTC-5 (CDT)
- ZIP Code: 56081
- FIPS code: 27-57040
- GNIS feature ID: 2396493
- Website: ci.stjames.mn.us

St. James or Saint James is a city in and the county seat of Watonwan County, Minnesota, United States. The population was 4,793 at the 2020 census.

Minnesota State Highways 4, 30, and 60 are three of the main routes in the city.

== History ==
In 1870, the directors of the St. Paul and Sioux City railroads chose the future townsite of St. James as the midpoint for a new railroad linking the two cities. Named for James Purington, an early settler, the city was incorporated in 1871. It was the hometown of Minnesota Governor Winfield Scott Hammond, a Democrat who served in 1915. In the 1940s, Theodore S. Mondale, the father of future Vice President of the United States Walter Mondale, was the pastor at First Methodist Church of St. James. Tony Downs Foods Co. has been a major employer since 1947, processing poultry and frozen meals.

St. James has two properties listed on the National Register of Historic Places: the Grand Opera House, completed in 1892, and the Watonwan County Courthouse, completed in 1896.

== Geography ==
According to the United States Census Bureau, the city has an area of 2.43 square miles (6.29 km^{2}); 2.40 square miles (6.22 km^{2}) is land and 0.03 square miles (0.08 km^{2}) is water.

=== Climate ===
Climate data for St. James, Minnesota, 1991–2020 normals, extremes 1958–present
Month	Jan	Feb	Mar	Apr	May	Jun	Jul	Aug	Sep	Oct	Nov	Dec	Year
Record high °F (°C)	64 (18)	67 (19)	86 (30)	93 (34)	102 (39)	104 (40)	105 (41)	101 (38)	98 (37)	92 (33)	82 (28)	68 (20)	105 (41)
Mean maximum °F (°C)	42.8 (6.0)	47.9 (8.8)	65.4 (18.6)	80.3 (26.8)	89.4 (31.9)	93.5 (34.2)	93.3 (34.1)	91.5 (33.1)	89.2 (31.8)	81.7 (27.6)	65.5 (18.6)	47.6 (8.7)	96.3 (35.7)
Mean daily maximum °F (°C)	23.5 (−4.7)	28.2 (−2.1)	40.4 (4.7)	56.2 (13.4)	69.3 (20.7)	79.5 (26.4)	82.8 (28.2)	80.4 (26.9)	74.2 (23.4)	60.0 (15.6)	43.1 (6.2)	29.0 (−1.7)	55.6 (13.1)
Daily mean °F (°C)	14.3 (−9.8)	19.1 (−7.2)	31.3 (−0.4)	45.4 (7.4)	58.4 (14.7)	68.9 (20.5)	72.4 (22.4)	69.7 (20.9)	62.4 (16.9)	48.6 (9.2)	33.9 (1.1)	20.5 (−6.4)	45.4 (7.4)
Mean daily minimum °F (°C)	5.2 (−14.9)	9.9 (−12.3)	22.2 (−5.4)	34.6 (1.4)	47.6 (8.7)	58.3 (14.6)	61.9 (16.6)	59.1 (15.1)	50.6 (10.3)	37.1 (2.8)	24.6 (−4.1)	12.0 (−11.1)	35.3 (1.8)
Mean minimum °F (°C)	−15.2 (−26.2)	−9.9 (−23.3)	−0.7 (−18.2)	19.1 (−7.2)	33.5 (0.8)	46.4 (8.0)	51.1 (10.6)	48.2 (9.0)	35.2 (1.8)	21.6 (−5.8)	6.2 (−14.3)	−8.7 (−22.6)	−18.1 (−27.8)
Record low °F (°C)	−30 (−34)	−30 (−34)	−26 (−32)	6 (−14)	19 (−7)	36 (2)	40 (4)	36 (2)	25 (−4)	10 (−12)	−13 (−25)	−27 (−33)	−30 (−34)
Average precipitation inches (mm)	1.09 (28)	0.80 (20)	1.82 (46)	3.14 (80)	4.65 (118)	4.89 (124)	4.12 (105)	3.95 (100)	3.43 (87)	2.52 (64)	1.58 (40)	1.13 (29)	33.12 (841)
Average snowfall inches (cm)	10.8 (27)	11.0 (28)	8.2 (21)	3.5 (8.9)	0.1 (0.25)	0.0 (0.0)	0.0 (0.0)	0.0 (0.0)	0.0 (0.0)	0.6 (1.5)	4.9 (12)	11.2 (28)	50.3 (126.65)
Average precipitation days (≥ 0.01 in)	5.8	3.9	5.7	10.3	13.1	12.1	9.6	9.5	8.0	8.4	5.1	7.2	98.7
Average snowy days (≥ 0.1 in)	5.4	4.6	3.1	1.1	0.1	0.0	0.0	0.0	0.0	0.3	2.7	5.6	22.9
Source 1: NOAA
Source 2: National Weather Service

== Demographics ==
Historical population
Census	Pop.	Note	%±
1880	444		—
1890	939		111.5%
1900	2,607		177.6%
1910	2,102		−19.4%
1920	2,673		27.2%
1930	2,808		5.1%
1940	3,400		21.1%
1950	3,861		13.6%
1960	4,174		8.1%
1970	4,027		−3.5%
1980	4,346		7.9%
1990	4,364		0.4%
2000	4,695		7.6%
2010	4,605		−1.9%
2020	4,793		4.1%
U.S. Decennial Census; 2020 Census

=== 2020 census ===
As of the 2020 census, St. James had a population of 4,793. The median age was 37.0 years. 26.4% of residents were under the age of 18 and 18.2% of residents were 65 years of age or older. For every 100 females there were 96.1 males, and for every 100 females age 18 and over there were 95.2 males age 18 and over.

0.0% of residents lived in urban areas, while 100.0% lived in rural areas.

There were 1,883 households in St. James, of which 33.0% had children under the age of 18 living in them. Of all households, 43.3% were married-couple households, 20.3% were households with a male householder and no spouse or partner present, and 26.6% were households with a female householder and no spouse or partner present. About 32.7% of all households were made up of individuals and 15.7% had someone living alone who was 65 years of age or older.

There were 1,996 housing units, of which 5.7% were vacant. The homeowner vacancy rate was 1.2% and the rental vacancy rate was 5.5%.

Racial composition as of the 2020 census
Race	Number	Percent
White	2,918	60.9%
Black or African American	19	0.4%
American Indian and Alaska Native	66	1.4%
Asian	30	0.6%
Native Hawaiian and Other Pacific Islander	0	0.0%
Some other race	1,138	23.7%
Two or more races	622	13.0%
Hispanic or Latino (of any race)	2,027	42.3%

=== 2010 census ===
As of the census of 2010, there were 4,605 people, 1,839 households, and 1,145 families living in the city. The population density was 1,918.8 inhabitants per square mile (740.9/km^{2}). There were 2,039 housing units at an average density of 849.6 units per square mile (328.0 units/km^{2}). The racial makeup of the city was 81.8% White, 0.7% African American, 0.9% Native American, 0.6% Asian, 14.9% from other races, and 1.1% from two or more races. Hispanic or Latino of any race were 31.0% of the population.

There were 1,839 households, of which 32.2% had children under the age of 18 living with them, 45.8% were married couples living together, 11.0% had a female householder with no husband present, 5.4% had a male householder with no wife present, and 37.7% were non-families. 33.4% of all households were made up of individuals, and 17.1% had someone living alone who was 65 years of age or older. The average household size was 2.47 and the average family size was 3.17.

The median age in the city was 37.8 years. 27.8% of residents were under the age of 18; 7.3% were between the ages of 18 and 24; 23.6% were from 25 to 44; 23.3% were from 45 to 64; and 17.9% were 65 years of age or older. The gender makeup of the city was 48.7% male and 51.3% female.

=== 2000 census ===
As of the census of 2000, there were 4,695 people, 1,845 households, and 1,186 families living in the city. The population density was 2,050.3 inhabitants per square mile (791.6/km^{2}). There were 2,006 housing units at an average density of 876.0 units per square mile (338.2 units/km^{2}). The racial makeup of the city was 83.24% White, 0.40% African American, 0.15% Native American, 0.51% Asian, 14.27% from other races, and 1.43% from two or more races. Hispanic or Latino of any race were 23.77% of the population.

There were 1,845 households, out of which 32.1% had children under the age of 18 living with them, 51.1% were married couples living together, 9.6% had a female householder with no husband present, and 35.7% were non-families. 32.0% of all households were made up of individuals, and 17.7% had someone living alone who was 65 years of age or older. The average household size was 2.50 and the average family size was 3.16.

In the city, the population was spread out, with 27.9% under the age of 18, 9.5% from 18 to 24, 23.9% from 25 to 44, 20.0% from 45 to 64, and 18.7% who were 65 years of age or older. The median age was 35 years. For every 100 females, there were 88.9 males. For every 100 females age 18 and over, there were 86.4 males.

The median income for a household in the city was $33,196, and the median income for a family was $40,993. Males had a median income of $30,036 versus $19,391 for females. The per capita income for the city was $15,336. About 9.0% of families and 10.8% of the population were below the poverty line, including 16.5% of those under age 18 and 9.9% of those age 65 or over.

== Politics ==
Presidential election results

Precinct General Election Results
Year	Republican	Democratic	Third parties
2020	50.7% 924	47.6% 867	1.7% 32
2016	48.8% 880	44.3% 799	6.9% 125
2012	42.1% 756	55.5% 997	2.4% 44
2008	42.3% 801	54.8% 1,039	2.9% 56
2004	49.1% 982	48.9% 977	2.0% 41
2000	44.5% 795	48.8% 872	6.7% 120
1996	32.3% 617	54.3% 1,038	13.4% 255
1992	31.6% 635	41.4% 831	27.0% 541
1988	51.2% 980	48.8% 933	0.0% 0
1984	56.5% 1,158	43.5% 893	0.0% 0
1980	49.7% 1,139	42.8% 981	7.5% 171
1976	49.7% 1,105	49.3% 1,097	1.0% 23
1968	51.4% 1,062	45.0% 928	3.6% 75
1964	43.1% 877	56.8% 1,154	0.1% 1
1960	65.1% 1,341	34.6% 713	0.3% 5

== Transport ==
The city owns and operates the St. James Municipal Airport.

== Notable people ==
- Moses K. Armstrong, businessman and legislator
- Becky Buller, bluegrass musician
- Peter Eckerstrom, Arizona Court of Appeals judge
- Brad Finstad, U.S. Representative for Minnesota's 1st congressional district
- Henry Norman Graven, United States District Court judge, born in St. James
- Winfield Scott Hammond, 18th Minnesota governor, established his home and his law practice in St. James
- Mac Hegstrom, businessman and politician, born in St. James
- Carl L. Johnson, businessman and legislator
- Mike Kingery, professional baseball player, born in St. James
- Gary Mielke, professional baseball player, born in St. James
- Carl G. Olson, farmer and politician, born in St. James

== Media ==
=== Television ===
Channel	Callsign	Affiliation	Branding	Subchannels		Owner
(Virtual)	Callsign	Affiliation	Branding	Channel	Programming	Owner
2.1	K26CS-D (KTCA Translator)	PBS	TPT 2	2.2; 2.4	Minnesota Channel; PBS Kids	Cooperative Television Association of Southern Minnesota
2.3	K29IE-D (KTCI Translator)	PBS	TPT Life	2.5	TPT Now	Cooperative Television Association of Southern Minnesota
4.2	K35KI-D	Start TV				Cooperative Television Association of Southern Minnesota
5.1	K30FN-D (KSTP Translator)	ABC	5 Eyewitness News	5.7	Heroes & Icons	Cooperative Television Association of Southern Minnesota
5.2	K14KE-D (KSTC Translator)	Ind.	45 TV	5.3; 5.4; 5.6	Me-TV; Antenna TV; This TV	Cooperative Television Association of Southern Minnesota
7.1	KMNF-LD	NBC	KEYC	7.2	The CW Plus	Gray Television
9.2	K23MF-D (WFTC Translator)	Ind.	FOX 9 Plus	9.3; 9.1	Movies! FOX	Cooperative Television Association of Southern Minnesota
9.9	K35KI-D (KMSP Translator)	FOX	FOX 9	9.4; 9.5	Buzzr; Light TV	Cooperative Television Association of Southern Minnesota
11.4	K32GX-D (KARE Translator)	NBC	KARE 11	11.5; 11.6; 11.7	Court TV; True Crime Network; Quest	Cooperative Television Association of Southern Minnesota
12.1	KEYC-TV	CBS	KEYC	12.2	Fox	Gray Television
16.1	K31KV-D	CTV		16.2; 16.3; 16.4; 16.5; 23.5	Action; Heartland; AMG; Biz; Grit	Cooperative Television Association of Southern Minnesota
17.1	K17MW-D	Youtoo America				Cooperative Television Association of Southern Minnesota
18.1	K18NE-D					Cooperative Television Association of Southern Minnesota
19.1	K19LI-D	Laff				Cooperative Television Association of Southern Minnesota
23.1	K34JX-D (WUCW Translator)	CW	CW 23	23.2; 23.3; 23.4	Comet; Charge! TBD	Cooperative Television Association of Southern Minnesota
23.6	K21DG-D	CTV 2				Cooperative Television Association of Southern Minnesota
24.1	K24JV-D	Retro TV				Cooperative Television Association of Southern Minnesota
28.1	K28OH-D					Cooperative Television Association of Southern Minnesota
41.1	K20LP-D (KPXM Translator)	ION	ION	41.2; 41.3; 41.4; 41.5; 41.6	Qubo; Ion Plus; ION Shop; QVC; HSN	Cooperative Television Association of Southern Minnesota
45.1	K22MQ-D	TBN		45.2; 45.3; 45.4; 45.5	Hillsong Channel; JUCE TV; Smile; Enlace	Cooperative Television Association of Southern Minnesota
