= Mac Hegstrom =

American politician

Millard Kermit Hegstrom Mac, M.K, (April 19, 1906 – January 17, 1978) was an American politician and businessman.

Hegstrom was born in St. James, Minnesota. He served in the United States military. Hegstrom was involved in the real estate, insurance, and newspaper businesses. He owned the St. James Independent newspaper. He served in the Minnesota House of Representatives from 1949 to 1950. and from 1959 to 1970. He died from a heart attack in St. James, Minnesota.
