= Bridge No. 6679 =

Historic bridge in Houston County, Minnesota

- U.S. National Register of Historic Places
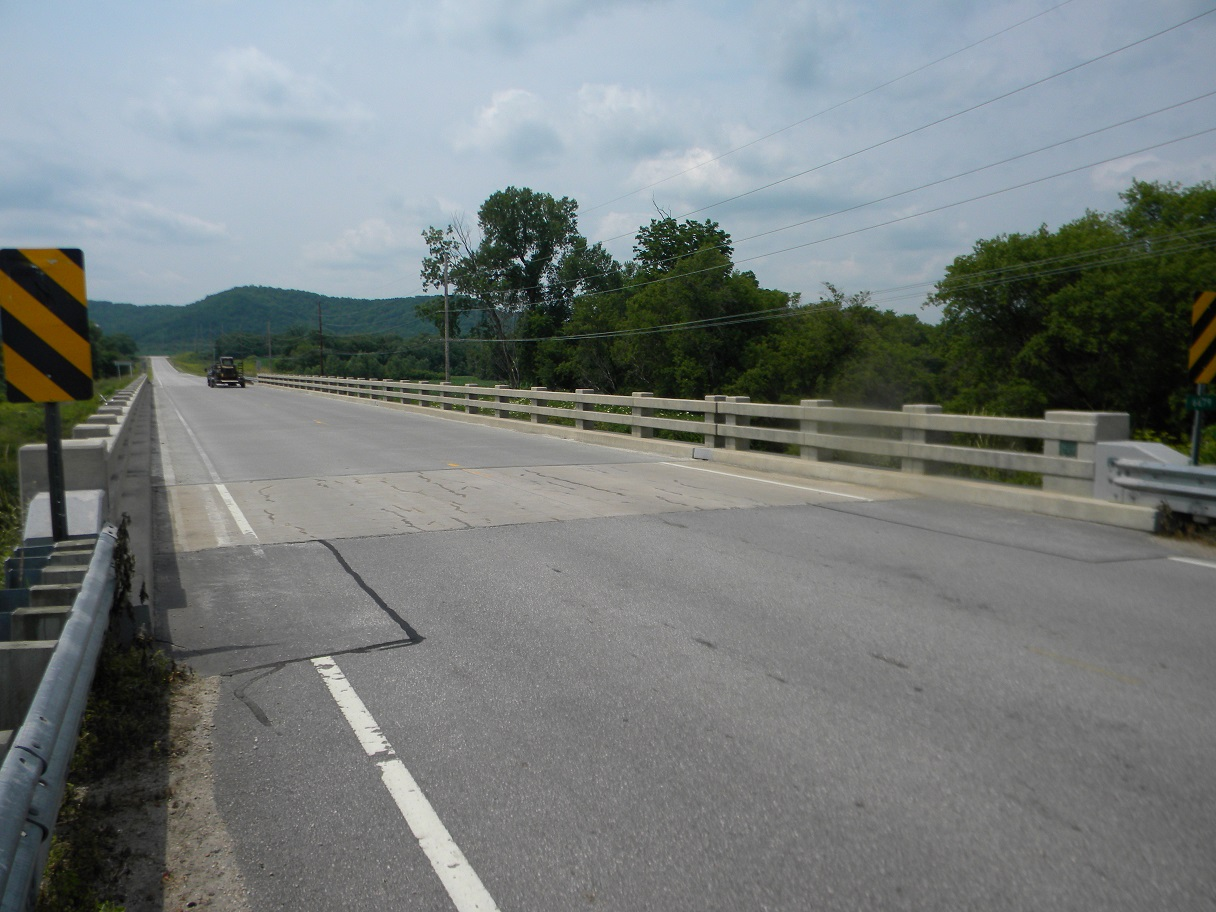

- Location within Minnesota
- Nearest city: Houston, Minnesota
- Coordinates: 43°44′19″N 91°33′52″W
- Area: less than one acre
- Built: 1949
- Built by: Leon Joyce
- Architect: Minnesota Dept. of Highways; et al.
- Architectural style: Continuous/cantilever beam
- NRHP reference No.: 11000468
- Added to NRHP: July 20, 2011

Bridge No. 6679 is a 314-foot-long (96 m) bridge that carries State Highway 76 over the South Fork of the Root River near Houston, Minnesota. Built in 1949 at a cost of $118,000, it was a step in the evolution of I-beam bridges in Minnesota. In the 1920s, steel I-beams of 24 inches (61 cm) deep were standard. Later, the depth increased to 30 inches (76 cm), then eventually to 36 inches (91 cm). This was made possible by advancements in steel mill technology. A 24-inch I-beam can support a span about 40 feet (12 m) long, whereas a 36-inch I-beam can support a span up to about 70 feet (21 m). This meant fewer piers were required to support the bridge. Bridge No. 6679 also features a cantilevered plan, where a projecting member is supported at only one end. The center span is 100 feet (30 m) long, with a 65-foot (20 m) section in the middle pinned at each end to cantilevered arms mounted on the piers. The bridge is also notable for the Modernist design of its concrete railings. The clean lines, lack of surface ornamentation, and Modernist architecture exemplifies the Minnesota Highway Department's post-World War II style.

The bridge was rehabilitated in 2012 by the Minnesota Department of Transportation. The bridge deck was replaced, as well as the expansion joints, bearings, and wingwalls. The railings were deteriorated, so new railings were designed which replicated the style of the old railings while keeping up with current safety standards.
