= Madelia, Minnesota =

City in Minnesota, United States

Madelia
- City
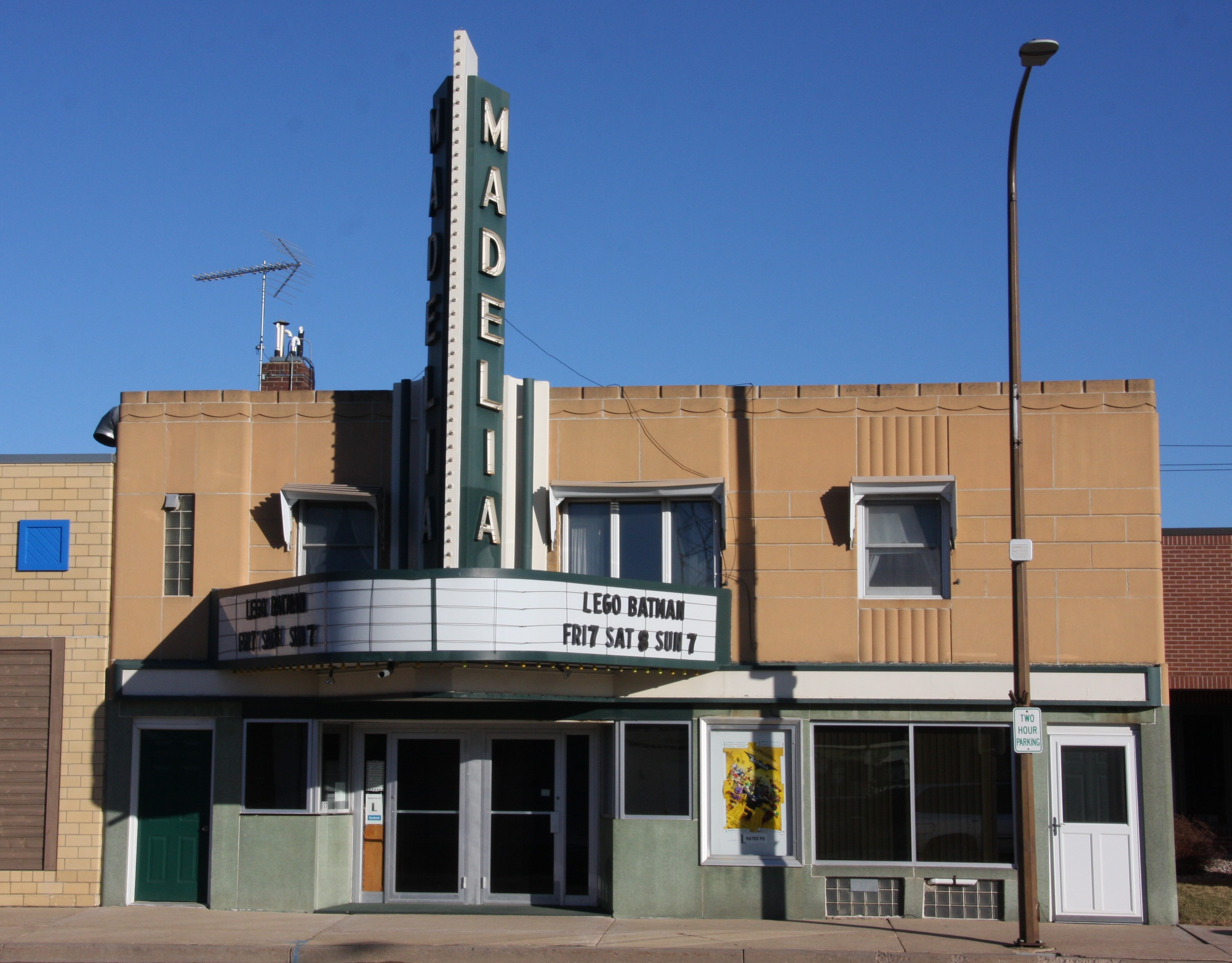
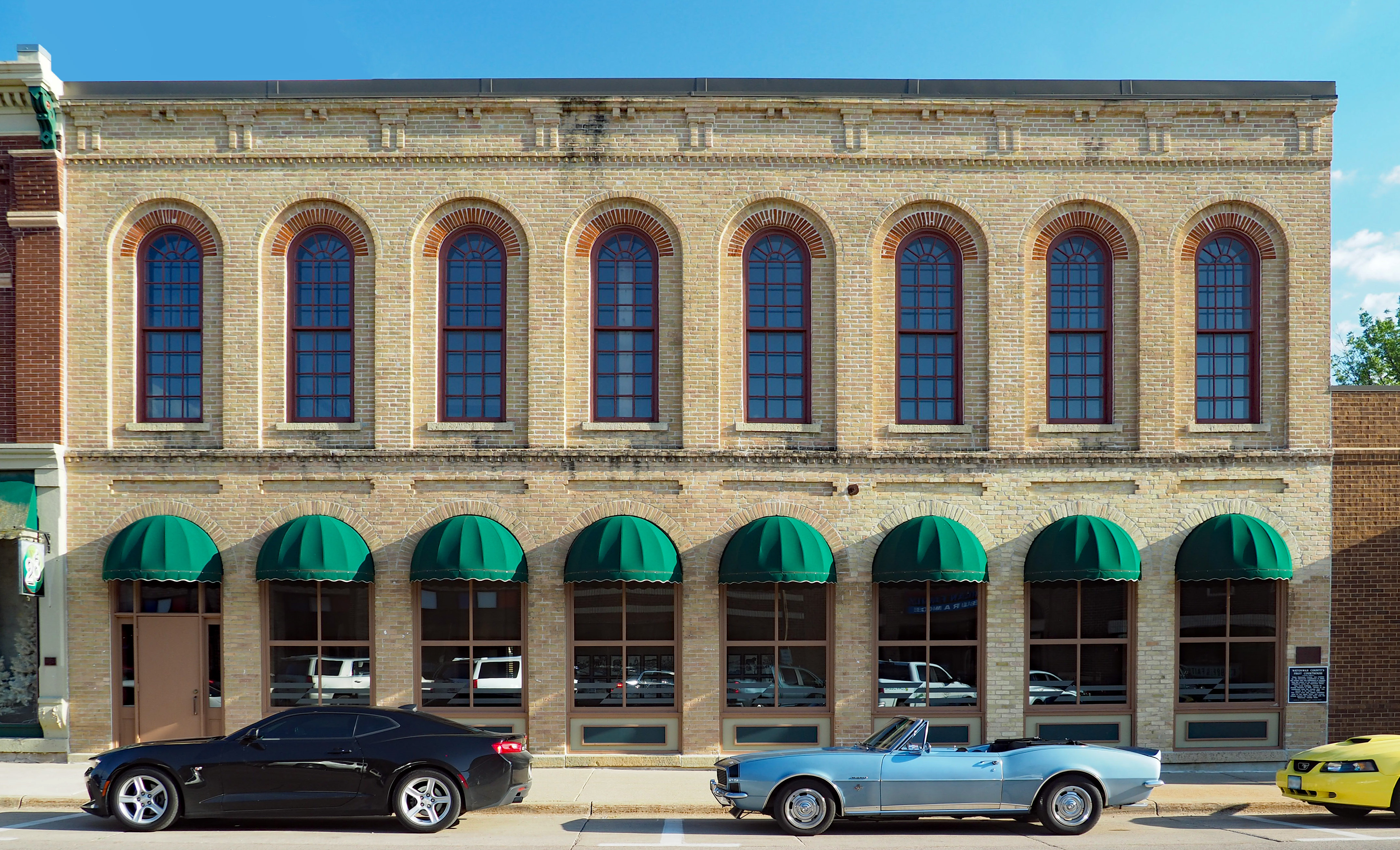
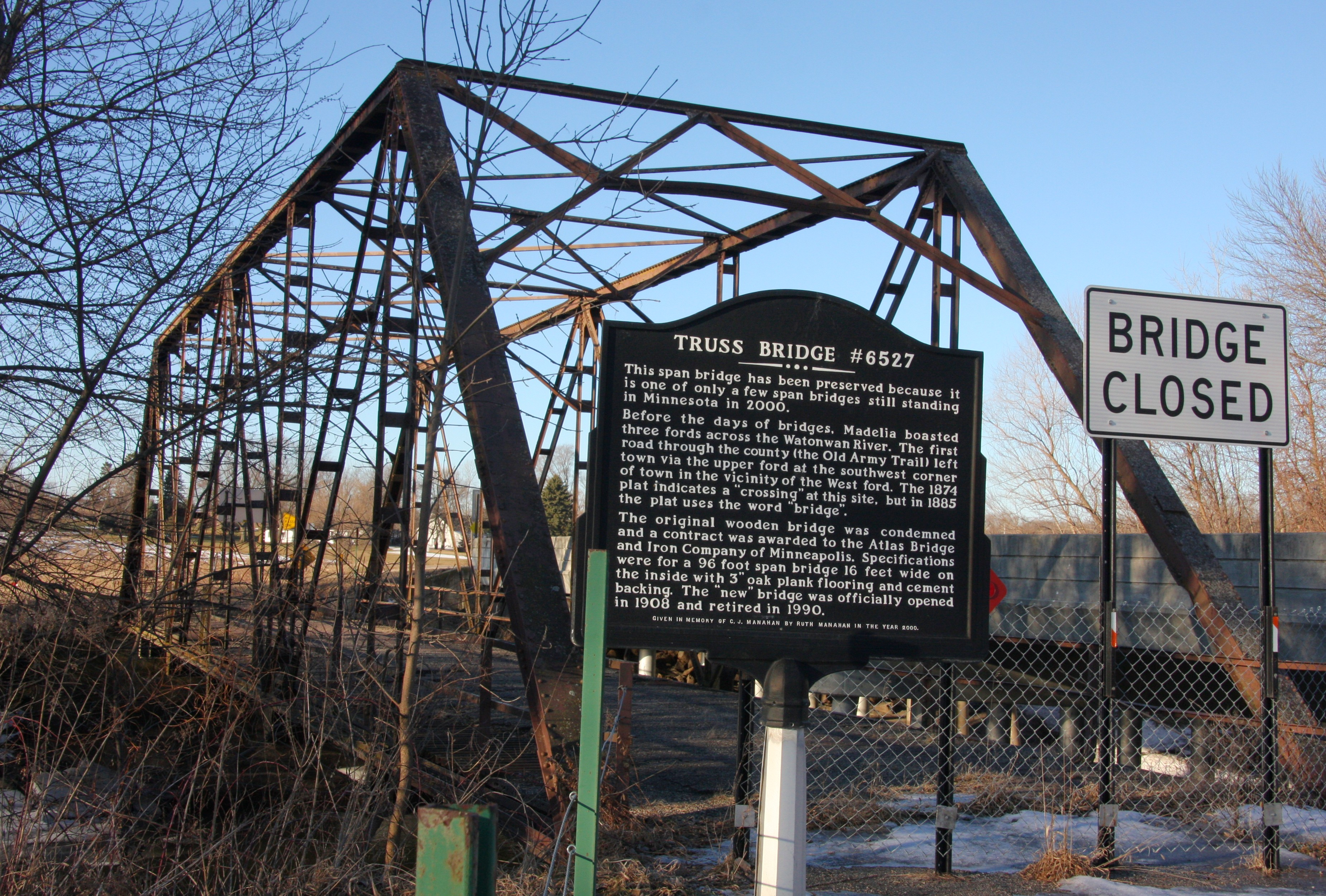
- Madelia Theatre Flanders' Block Historic West Bridge
- Motto(s): "Pride Of The Prairie" & "Pheasant Capital of Minnesota"
- Location of Madelia, Minnesota
- Coordinates: 44°02′53″N 94°25′12″W
- Country: United States
- State: Minnesota
- County: Watonwan

Government
  - Type: Mayor – Council
  - Mayor: Cody Eager

Area
  - Total: 1.51 sq mi (3.92 km^{2})
  - Land: 1.51 sq mi (3.92 km^{2})
  - Water: 0 sq mi (0.00 km^{2})
- Elevation: 1,004 ft (306 m)

Population (2020)
  - Total: 2,396
  - Density: 1,584.3/sq mi (611.69/km^{2})
- Time zone: UTC-6 (Central (CST))
  - Summer (DST): UTC-5 (CDT)
- ZIP code: 56062
- Area code: 507
- FIPS code: 27-39230
- GNIS feature ID: 2395804
- Website: www.madeliamn.com

Madelia (/məˈdiːli.ə/ mə-DEE-lee-ə) is a city in Watonwan County, Minnesota, United States, along the Watonwan River. The population was 2,396 at the 2020 census.

== History ==
Madelia was founded in 1857, and named for the daughter of a first settler. A post office has been in operation at Madelia since 1860. Madelia was incorporated in 1872.

In 1876, the remaining members of the James-Younger Gang were captured near Madelia after their failed attempt at bank robbery in Northfield, Minnesota. Madelia used to hold an event every September called Younger Brothers Day. The event included several activities including a reenactment of the bank robbery as well as the gunfight and capture of the Younger Brothers.

From 1885-1890 Winfield Scott Hammond served as the Madelia School Superintendent. Hammond later went on to pass the bar exam and serve in Minnesota State Legislature, the U.S. Congress, and eventually ran and was elected as Minnesota's 18th Governor.

Madelia contains two properties listed on the National Register of Historic Places: the 1872 Flanders' Block and the 1908 West Bridge.

In 2016, a fire greatly damaged downtown, destroying at least eight businesses.

== Geography ==
According to the United States Census Bureau, the city has a total area of 1.47 square miles (3.81 km^{2}), all land.

Minnesota State Highways 15 and 60 are two of the main routes in the city.

== Government ==
Madelia is located within Minnesota's 1st congressional district, represented by Republican, Brad Finstad.

== Demographics ==
Historical population
Census	Pop.	Note	%±
1880	489		—
1890	852		74.2%
1900	1,272		49.3%
1910	1,273		0.1%
1920	1,447		13.7%
1930	1,397		−3.5%
1940	1,652		18.3%
1950	1,790		8.4%
1960	2,190		22.3%
1970	2,316		5.8%
1980	2,130		−8.0%
1990	2,237		5.0%
2000	2,340		4.6%
2010	2,308		−1.4%
2020	2,396		3.8%
U.S. Decennial Census

=== 2020 census ===
As of the 2020 census, Madelia had a population of 2,396. The median age was 37.0 years. 26.5% of residents were under the age of 18 and 17.0% of residents were 65 years of age or older. For every 100 females there were 94.2 males, and for every 100 females age 18 and over there were 92.8 males age 18 and over.

0.0% of residents lived in urban areas, while 100.0% lived in rural areas.

There were 923 households in Madelia, of which 33.7% had children under the age of 18 living in them. Of all households, 44.0% were married-couple households, 20.8% were households with a male householder and no spouse or partner present, and 28.5% were households with a female householder and no spouse or partner present. About 31.8% of all households were made up of individuals and 16.3% had someone living alone who was 65 years of age or older.

There were 992 housing units, of which 7.0% were vacant. The homeowner vacancy rate was 1.0% and the rental vacancy rate was 7.4%.

Racial composition as of the 2020 census
Race	Number	Percent
White	1,725	72.0%
Black or African American	20	0.8%
American Indian and Alaska Native	16	0.7%
Asian	8	0.3%
Native Hawaiian and Other Pacific Islander	0	0.0%
Some other race	363	15.2%
Two or more races	264	11.0%
Hispanic or Latino (of any race)	783	32.7%

=== 2010 census ===
As of the census of 2010, there were 2,308 people, 900 households, and 572 families residing in the city. The population density was 1,570.1 inhabitants per square mile (606.2/km^{2}). There were 1,004 housing units at an average density of 683.0 per square mile (263.7/km^{2}). The racial makeup of the city was 84.0% White, 1.7% African American, 0.1% Native American, 0.3% Asian, 12.4% from other races, and 1.4% from two or more races. Hispanic or Latino of any race were 26.8% of the population.

There were 900 households, of which 33.1% had children under the age of 18 living with them, 45.6% were married couples living together, 11.2% had a female householder with no husband present, 6.8% had a male householder with no wife present, and 36.4% were non-families. 30.9% of all households were made up of individuals, and 15.2% had someone living alone who was 65 years of age or older. The average household size was 2.47 and the average family size was 3.06.

The median age in the city was 37.6 years. 26% of residents were under the age of 18; 8.2% were between the ages of 18 and 24; 23.6% were from 25 to 44; 23.7% were from 45 to 64; and 18.5% were 65 years of age or older. The gender makeup of the city was 48.7% male and 51.3% female.

=== 2000 census ===
As of the census of 2000, there were 2,340 people, 911 households, and 571 families residing in the city. The population density was 1,876.4 inhabitants per square mile (724.5/km^{2}). There were 1,000 housing units at an average density of 801.9 per square mile (309.6/km^{2}). The racial makeup of the city was 85.47% White, 0.64% African American, 0.13% Native American, 0.26% Asian, 0.09% Pacific Islander, 11.88% from other races, and 1.54% from two or more races. Hispanic or Latino of any race were 20.98% of the population.

There were 911 households, out of which 33.4% had children under the age of 18 living with them, 48.6% were married couples living together, 9.0% had a female householder with no husband present, and 37.3% were non-families. 34.0% of all households were made up of individuals, and 18.8% had someone living alone who was 65 years of age or older. The average household size was 2.47 and the average family size was 3.16.

In the city, the population was spread out, with 27.2% under the age of 18, 8.3% from 18 to 24, 25.3% from 25 to 44, 18.5% from 45 to 64, and 20.6% who were 65 years of age or older. The median age was 38 years. For every 100 females, there were 89.5 males. For every 100 females age 18 and over, there were 88.4 males.

The median income for a household in the city was $34,219, and the median income for a family was $41,167. Males had a median income of $29,417 versus $19,806 for females. The per capita income for the city was $16,266. About 8.5% of families and 9.7% of the population were below the poverty line, including 12.0% of those under the age of 18 and 8.2% of those 65 and older.

== Education ==
The Madelia Community Schools service approximately 650 students in Kindergarten through the 12th grade. The district maintains two buildings – a K-6 elementary school and a 7–12 junior-senior high school. The community reinforced its support of education in 1999 when it passed a bond referendum that funded the construction of an addition to the elementary school, demolition of the 1913 elementary school addition, and renovation of the 1949 and 1965 additions.

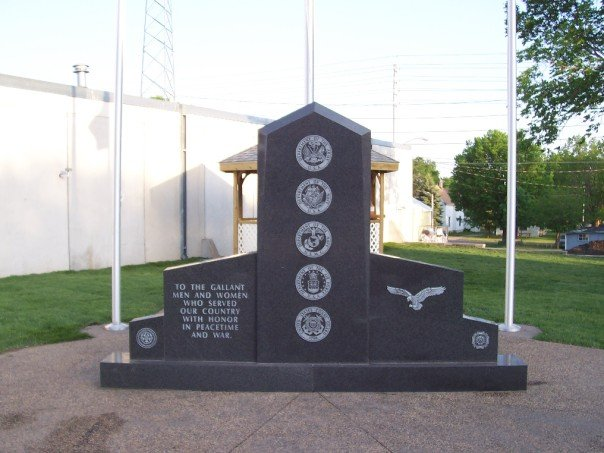
Madelia War Memorial

The district offers a progressive curriculum that includes advanced mathematics and science, CAD, and computer programming.

=== Extracurriculars ===
High school sport offerings include: nine man football, volleyball, cross-country, basketball, baseball, wrestling, softball, track and field, and golf. Some sports are partnered with neighboring Truman High School. When this occurs, the team mascot is the Madelia-Truman Jayhawks, with orange and blue team colors. Non-partnered sports are known as the Madelia Blackhawks, with orange and black team colors. The Jayhawk wrestling team competed in state competition from 2008 through 2013.

=== Parochial School ===
St. Mary's Catholic Church operates a small parochial school. St. Mary's Elementary serves approximately 55 students in pre-kindergarten through sixth grade. St. Mary's is accredited by the National Catholic Education Association. Principal is Jen Slater.

== Recreation ==
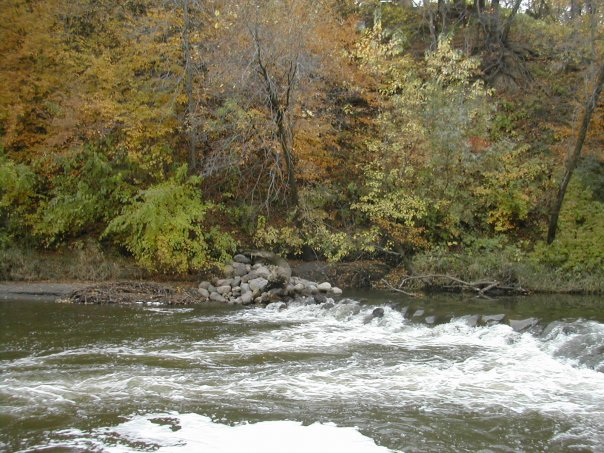
The Watonwan river flows through Watona park

Madelia offers several different places of recreation. Watona park is the site for many different city and seasonal events. Watona offers a full service campground, several playgrounds and shelters, two baseball fields, one softball field, and the 9 hole Madelia golf course. Near Watona park are several basketball and tennis courts, as well as the outdoor Madelia Swimming Pool.

Watonwan County Historical Society. The Watonwan County Historical Society was organized in 1935. World War II ended those activities. Twenty-nine interested persons met at the American Legion Post House, Madelia, in 1966 launching the present organization.

== Notable people ==
- Otto T. Bang (1931–2008), businessman and politician, was born in Madelia.
- Knut Hamsun, who was awarded the Nobel Prize in Literature in 1920, resided in Madelia in 1883–1884. He wrote a story, "Fear", about his experiences there. The eminent Unitarian minister and writer, Kristofer Janson, who preached in the nearby Nora Free Christian Church, met Hamsun in Madelia and offered Hamsun employment as a secretary.
- Julius E. Haycraft (1871–1951), lawyer, judge, and politician
