= Amboy, Minnesota =

City in Minnesota, United States

Amboy
- City
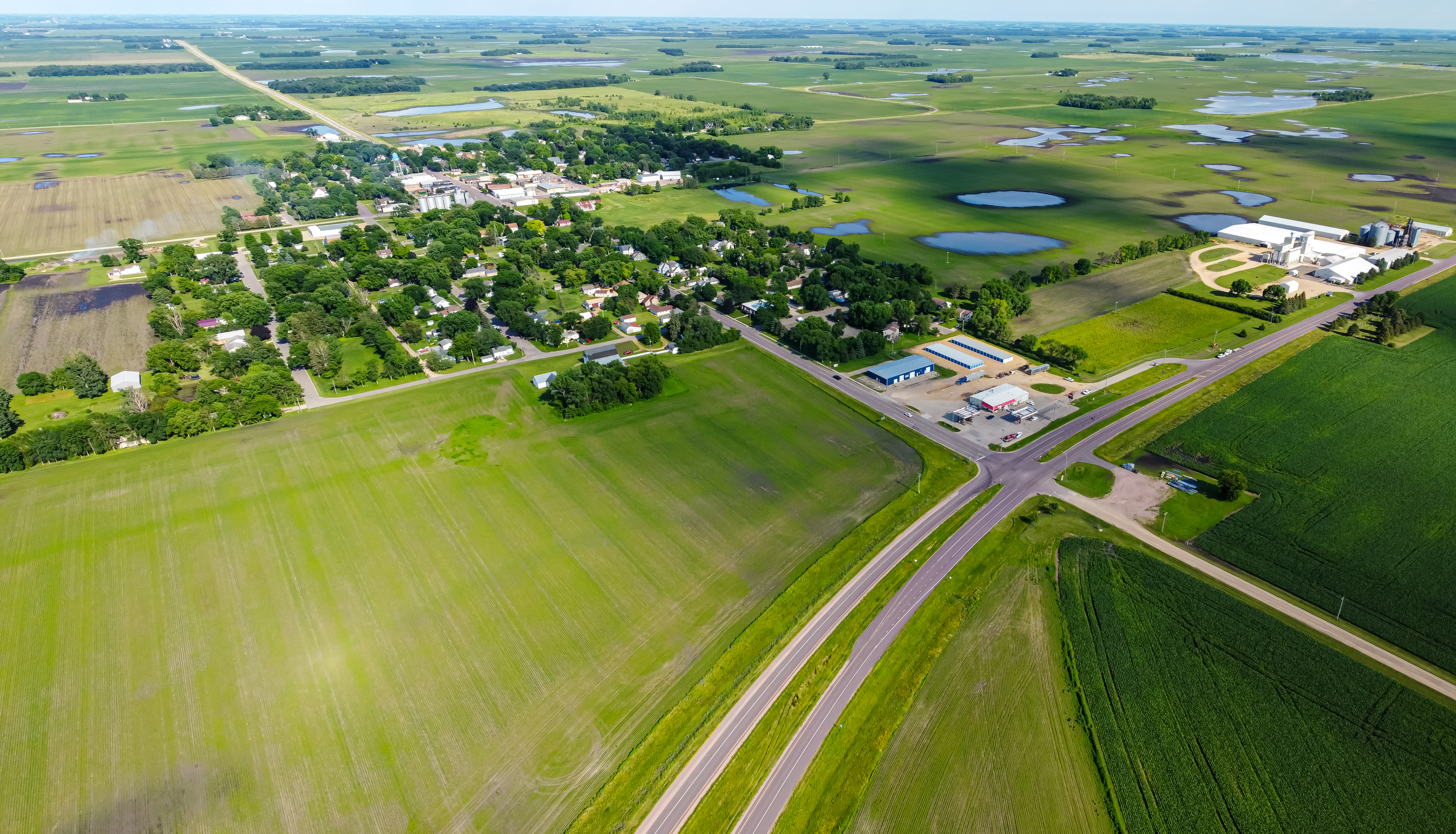
- US-169 runs through town

- Location of Amboy, Minnesota
- Coordinates: 43°53′17″N 94°10′00″W
- Country: United States
- State: Minnesota
- County: Blue Earth

Government
  - Type: Mayor - Council
  - Mayor: Mike Sevcik

Area
  - Total: 0.31 sq mi (0.81 km^{2})
  - Land: 0.31 sq mi (0.81 km^{2})
  - Water: 0 sq mi (0.00 km^{2})
- Elevation: 1,043 ft (318 m)

Population (2020)
  - Total: 535
  - Density: 1,716.6/sq mi (662.78/km^{2})
- Time zone: UTC-6 (Central (CST))
  - Summer (DST): UTC-5 (CDT)
- ZIP code: 56010
- Area codes: 507, 924
- FIPS code: 27-01324
- GNIS feature ID: 2393945
- Website: amboymn.com

Amboy (/ˈæmbɔɪ/ AM-boy) is a city in Blue Earth County, Minnesota, United States. The population was 535 at the 2020 census. It is part of the Mankato-North Mankato Metropolitan Statistical Area. The city was founded in 1879. It celebrated its 125th anniversary in September 2004.

== History ==
Shelby Township was organized in 1858, the year Minnesota achieved statehood. The township's main inducement to settlement was its rich prairie loam, rendered still more attractive by the availability of wood lots along the Blue Earth River. By 1860, Shelby Township was the most populous in Blue Earth County. In addition to its 315 residents, it also sustained a small but thriving village known as Shelbyville, located in Section 35, about two miles south of modern Amboy. In the early 1860s Shelbyville hosted the county fair. The town included a hotel, church, schoolhouse, mill, two stores, a blacksmith shop, a wagon shop, and a post office.

By 1875, Shelby Township was a relatively mature agricultural area, well known for grains and livestock. At that time, the township's population was 800, and it remained at approximately the same level for the next thirty years. Despite such overall stability, there were some significant population shifts within the township itself.

The main catalyst for change was the St. Paul and Sioux City Railway (later a part of the Omaha Road), which in 1879 built a north–south branch line through Blue Earth County. In several townships along the proposed route, residents offered the railroad financial incentives to locate a depot in their vicinity including donated land and a red cow with a broken horn. For reasons that are not completely clear, the citizens of Shelbyville declined to do so. On September 2, 1879, they voted down a proposition to give the railroad a $10,000 grant. A week earlier, however, a group of farmers residing two miles north of Shelbyville had made the railroad an offer of their own.

The farmers' proposal, which was accepted, was to buy forty acres of land for the railroad, if the railroad would lay out town lots, build a depot, and build a grain elevator. The town, named Amboy, was laid out in October 1879. This triggered the death of Shelbyville, which was deserted within three years, the buildings having been moved to other locations. Incorporating as a city in 1887, Amboy had more than 400 inhabitants by the turn of the century.

== Geography ==
According to the U.S. Census Bureau, the city has a total area of 0.31 square miles (0.80 km^{2}), all land.

U.S. Route 169 and Minnesota State Highway 30 are two of the main routes in the community.

=== Climate ===
Climate data for Amboy, Minnesota, 1991–2020 normals, extremes 1905–2019
Month	Jan	Feb	Mar	Apr	May	Jun	Jul	Aug	Sep	Oct	Nov	Dec	Year
Record high °F (°C)	62 (17)	66 (19)	84 (29)	92 (33)	102 (39)	101 (38)	101 (38)	98 (37)	96 (36)	94 (34)	82 (28)	68 (20)	102 (39)
Mean daily maximum °F (°C)	25.5 (−3.6)	30.2 (−1.0)	42.8 (6.0)	59.4 (15.2)	72.5 (22.5)	81.7 (27.6)	84.1 (28.9)	81.6 (27.6)	75.9 (24.4)	61.5 (16.4)	44.2 (6.8)	30.4 (−0.9)	57.5 (14.2)
Daily mean °F (°C)	16.9 (−8.4)	21.2 (−6.0)	33.5 (0.8)	47.8 (8.8)	60.6 (15.9)	70.6 (21.4)	73.4 (23.0)	70.7 (21.5)	63.7 (17.6)	50.4 (10.2)	35.3 (1.8)	22.4 (−5.3)	47.2 (8.4)
Mean daily minimum °F (°C)	8.3 (−13.2)	12.2 (−11.0)	24.3 (−4.3)	36.3 (2.4)	48.7 (9.3)	59.5 (15.3)	62.6 (17.0)	59.8 (15.4)	51.6 (10.9)	39.2 (4.0)	26.4 (−3.1)	14.3 (−9.8)	36.9 (2.7)
Record low °F (°C)	−33 (−36)	−36 (−38)	−16 (−27)	7 (−14)	21 (−6)	35 (2)	46 (8)	38 (3)	26 (−3)	14 (−10)	−16 (−27)	−27 (−33)	−36 (−38)
Average precipitation inches (mm)	0.83 (21)	0.87 (22)	1.67 (42)	3.30 (84)	4.27 (108)	5.26 (134)	4.15 (105)	3.93 (100)	3.34 (85)	2.56 (65)	1.47 (37)	1.12 (28)	32.77 (831)
Average snowfall inches (cm)	10.4 (26)	8.9 (23)	7.4 (19)	3.5 (8.9)	0.1 (0.25)	0.0 (0.0)	0.0 (0.0)	0.0 (0.0)	0.0 (0.0)	0.4 (1.0)	4.8 (12)	10.8 (27)	46.3 (117.15)
Average precipitation days (≥ 0.01 in)	5.3	5.2	6.7	9.4	10.7	10.7	8.4	8.0	6.9	6.9	5.0	6.6	89.8
Average snowy days (≥ 0.1 in)	4.3	4.3	2.5	1.2	0.1	0.0	0.0	0.0	0.0	0.2	2.0	5.0	19.6
Source 1: NOAA
Source 2: XMACIS2

== Demographics ==
Historical population
Census	Pop.	Note	%±
1880	56		—
1890	215		283.9%
1900	432		100.9%
1910	435		0.7%
1920	527		21.1%
1930	593		12.5%
1940	576		−2.9%
1950	585		1.6%
1960	629		7.5%
1970	571		−9.2%
1980	606		6.1%
1990	517		−14.7%
2000	575		11.2%
2010	534		−7.1%
2020	535		0.2%
U.S. Decennial Census; 2020 Census

=== 2010 census ===
As of the census of 2010, there were 534 people, 232 households, and 157 families residing in the city. The population density was 1,722.6 inhabitants per square mile (665.1/km^{2}). There were 260 housing units at an average density of 838.7 per square mile (323.8/km^{2}). The racial makeup of the city was 96.8% White, 1.3% African American, 0.2% Native American, 0.4% Asian, 1.1% from other races, and 0.2% from two or more races. Hispanic or Latino of any race were 5.1% of the population.

There were 232 households, of which 26.3% had children under the age of 18 living with them, 55.2% were married couples living together, 8.6% had a female householder with no husband present, 3.9% had a male householder with no wife present, and 32.3% were non-families. 28.9% of all households were made up of individuals, and 11.6% had someone living alone who was 65 years of age or older. The average household size was 2.30 and the average family size was 2.78.

The median age in the city was 41.7 years. 21.2% of residents were under the age of 18; 9% were between the ages of 18 and 24; 23% were from 25 to 44; 28.4% were from 45 to 64; and 18.2% were 65 years of age or older. The gender makeup of the city was 50.7% male and 49.3% female.

=== 2000 census ===
As of the census of 2000, there were 575 people, 242 households, and 161 families residing in the city. The population density was 1,838.9 inhabitants per square mile (710.0/km^{2}). There were 268 housing units at an average density of 857.1 per square mile (330.9/km^{2}). The racial makeup of the city was 98.43% White, 0.17% Asian, and 1.39% from two or more races. Hispanic or Latino of any race were 1.39% of the population.

There were 242 households, out of which 33.1% had children under the age of 18 living with them, 57.9% were married couples living together, 5.8% had a female householder with no husband present, and 33.1% were non-families. 30.6% of all households were made up of individuals, and 17.4% had someone living alone who was 65 years of age or older. The average household size was 2.38 and the average family size was 2.98.

In the city, the population was spread out, with 27.0% under the age of 18, 6.1% from 18 to 24, 25.0% from 25 to 44, 23.0% from 45 to 64, and 19.0% who were 65 years of age or older. The median age was 40 years. For every 100 females, there were 96.9 males. For every 100 females age 18 and over, there were 91.8 males.

The median income for a household in the city was $35,595, and the median income for a family was $39,844. Males had a median income of $31,667 versus $20,833 for females. The per capita income for the city was $15,658. About 8.3% of families and 13.0% of the population were below the poverty line, including 21.8% of those under age 18 and 12.8% of those age 65 or over.

== Education ==
Maple River West Middle School is located in Amboy. As the name implies it was a middle school, which serviced 6th, 7th, and 8th graders. In the spring of 2009, the board members of The Maple River School District, Independent School District #2135, voted in favor of closing the Amboy middle school and reorganizing the student body in an effort to cut costs. Elementary students of Amboy normally go to schools in Minnesota Lake or Mankato, while middle or high school students usually attend schools in Mapleton, Lake Crystal or Mankato.
