= Okabena, Minnesota =

City in Minnesota, United States

Okabena
- City
- Location of Okabena, Minnesota
- Coordinates: 43°44′21″N 95°19′08″W
- Country: United States
- State: Minnesota
- County: Jackson

Government
  - Type: Mayor – Council
  - Mayor: Brent Groen

Area
  - Total: 0.34 sq mi (0.88 km^{2})
  - Land: 0.34 sq mi (0.88 km^{2})
  - Water: 0 sq mi (0.00 km^{2})
- Elevation: 1,421 ft (433 m)

Population (2020)
  - Total: 203
  - Density: 599.8/sq mi (231.58/km^{2})
- Time zone: UTC-6 (Central (CST))
  - Summer (DST): UTC-5 (CDT)
- ZIP code: 56161
- Area code: 507
- FIPS code: 27-48184
- GNIS feature ID: 2395311
- Website: https://okabenacity.org/

Okabena (/oʊkəˈbiːnə/ OH-kə-BEE-nə) is a town in Jackson County, Minnesota, United States. The population was 203 at the 2020 census. The community's name is a Dakota term meaning "the nesting place of herons."

== History ==
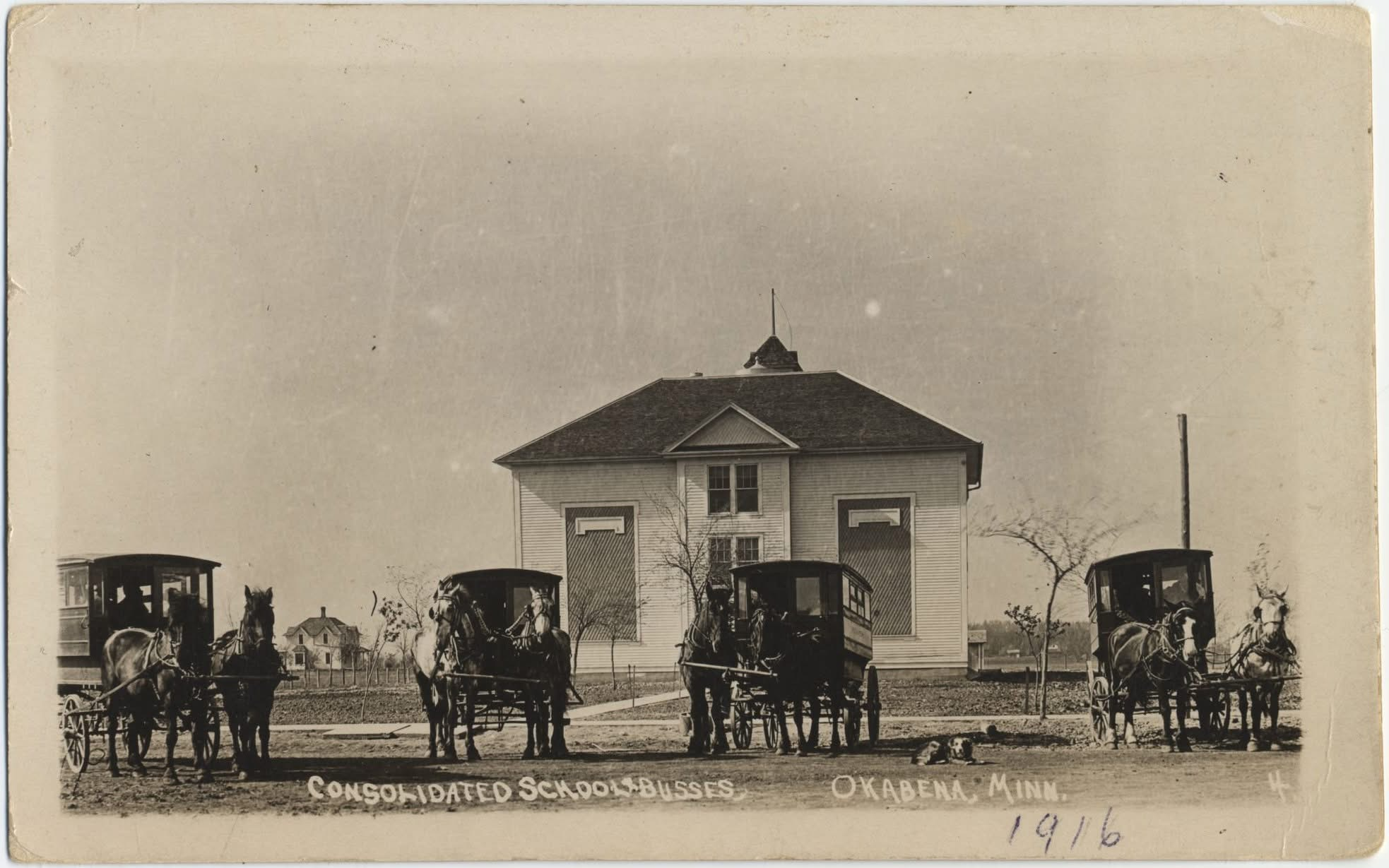
School buses in Okabena, MN, 1916

Okabena was founded in 1879 after the railroad had been extended to that point. A post office has been in operation at Okabena since 1880.

=== Bank robbery ===
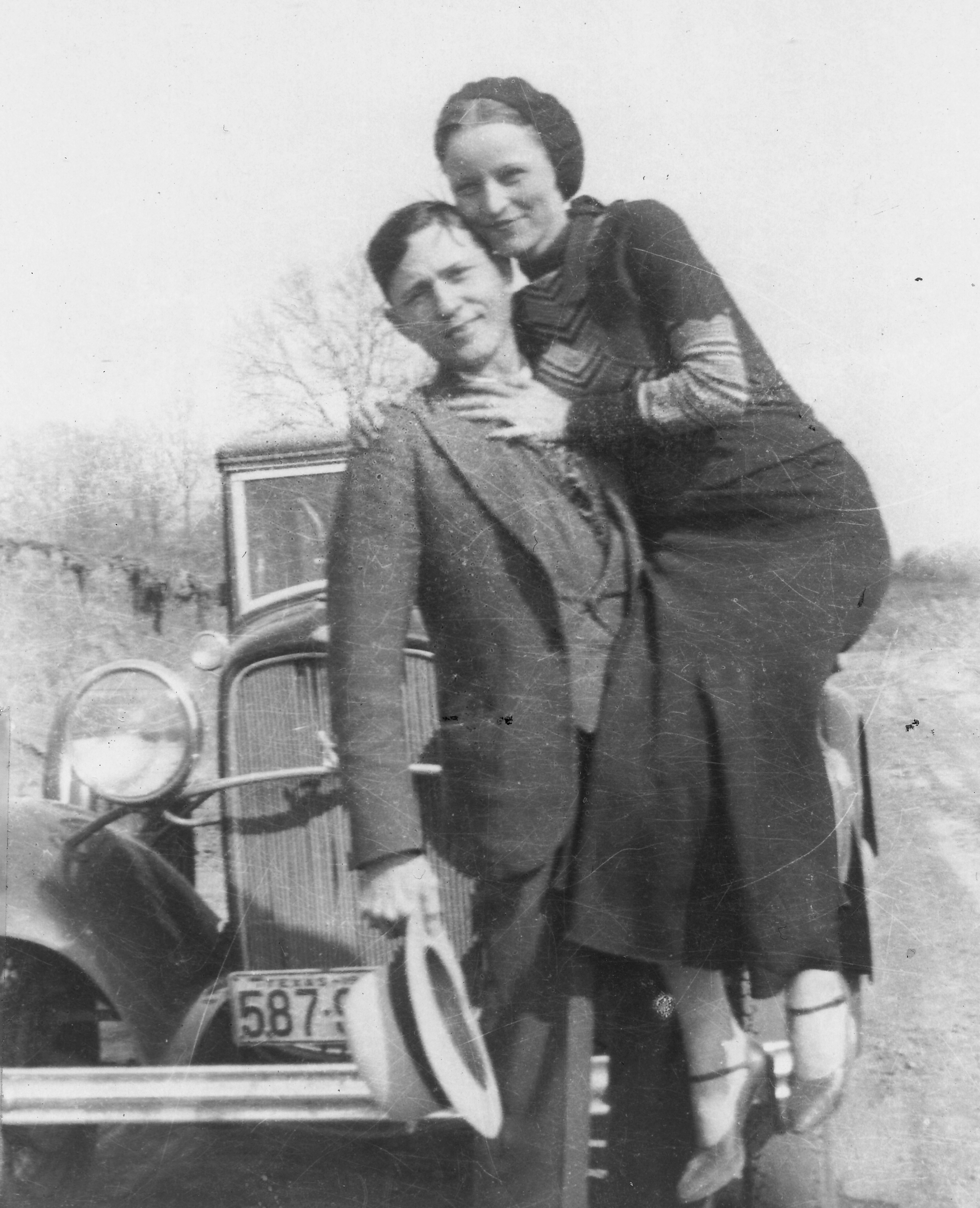
Bonnie and Clyde in a photo found by police in April 1933 at an abandoned hideout

On May 19, 1933, the Okabena Bank was robbed by Bonnie and Clyde. After leaving the bank, the outlaws' car sped through Okabena, spraying the town with machine-gun fire. Schoolchildren ducked behind trees and bullets sliced through walls and shattered windows. They escaped on a country road with approximately $2500 (approximately $44,000 in 2013 dollars). Three other people (Tony, Floyd and Mildred Strain) were sent to prison for the crime, and it was not recognized for many years that the real robbers were the infamous Bonnie and Clyde Gang.

==== Investigation and trial ====
In 1933 alone, 32 banks were robbed in Minnesota. The FBI did not investigate bank robberies until 1934, so the Minnesota Bureau of Criminal Apprehension (BCA) and the Jackson County Sheriff were responsible for solving the crime. Agent William Conly of the Minnesota BCA was provided with eyewitness descriptions matching the appearances of Tony and Floyd Strain. The description of the incident also described a woman involved as the get away driver, who was presumed to be Mildred Strain and later matched by eyewitnesses. They were local criminals who were suspected in a number of other local bank heists. After two quick trials, they were convicted by Jackson County juries, and Tony and Floyd were sentenced to 10–80 years and Mildred was sentenced to 5–40 years, as she was only the getaway driver, a less serious offence.

The trio were also suspected of robbing banks in the Minnesota towns of Chandler, Ihlen, Madison, Russell and Westbrook and the South Dakota towns of Canova, Vermillion, Kaylor and Huron. However, events in later years made clear that the trio could not have been responsible for those other bank robberies. Mildred insisted she was framed for the Okabena robbery until the day she was released from Shakopee Women’s Prison in 1942. Moreover, two officers of the Sioux City, Iowa police department later claimed they were watching her at her residence on the day of the robbery. Tony and Floyd also maintained their innocence until they were released from Stillwater Penitentiary in 1946.

==== Later evidence ====
Years after Bonnie and Clyde had died, a book was ghost-written by Bonnie's mother and Clyde's sister, claiming that Bonnie and Clyde had robbed the bank in Okabena, along with Clyde's brother Buck Barrow and Buck's wife Blanche Barrow. Another book written by Blanch Barrow made the same claim.

Shortly before the Okabena robbery, police in Joplin, Missouri raided a house used by Bonnie and Clyde as a hide-out. In the house they found undeveloped rolls of film of Bonnie and Clyde brandishing pistols and machine guns, along with several poems of their exploits written by Bonnie. The poems and the photos were later published in newspapers, making the pair famous, but by this time, the Strains had been convicted.

The Strain trio maintained their innocence, right up to their deaths, Tony in 1970, Mildred in 1974, and Floyd in 1994. The town of Okabena now recognizes the real robbers, and re-enacts the bank heist every year as part of their Fourth of July festival.

According to Professor Brad Chislom, historian at St. Cloud State University, “Bonnie and Clyde, along with Buck and Blanche Barrow, robbed the bank at Okabena. The residents of Jackson County who helped convict the Strains no doubt acted in good faith; vital information had been concealed from them. Bank robberies were occurring at an alarming rate in 1933. At Okabena, over-zealous, dishonest investigators placed a higher value on clearing the rash of cases than on getting at the truth, and the Strains paid the price. Only history can clear their names now.”

== Geography ==
According to the United States Census Bureau, the city has a total area of 0.21 square miles (0.54 km^{2}), all land.

The community is located on County Roads 9 and 20 west of South Heron Lake.

== Demographics ==
Historical population
Census	Pop.	Note	%±
1940	210		—
1950	236		12.4%
1960	244		3.4%
1970	237		−2.9%
1980	263		11.0%
1990	223		−15.2%
2000	185		−17.0%
2010	188		1.6%
2020	203		8.0%
U.S. Decennial Census

=== 2010 census ===
As of the census of 2010, there were 188 people, 74 households, and 54 families residing in the city. The population density was 895.2 inhabitants per square mile (345.6/km^{2}). There were 86 housing units at an average density of 409.5 per square mile (158.1/km^{2}). The racial makeup of the city was 92.6% White, 1.1% African American, 1.1% Native American, 0.5% Asian, 3.2% from other races, and 1.6% from two or more races. Hispanic or Latino of any race were 4.8% of the population.

There were 74 households, of which 35.1% had children under the age of 18 living with them, 60.8% were married couples living together, 9.5% had a female householder with no husband present, 2.7% had a male householder with no wife present, and 27.0% were non-families. 24.3% of all households were made up of individuals, and 13.6% had someone living alone who was 65 years of age or older. The average household size was 2.54 and the average family size was 2.93.

The median age in the city was 37.8 years. 30.3% of residents were under the age of 18; 3.1% were between the ages of 18 and 24; 26.6% were from 25 to 44; 22.9% were from 45 to 64; and 17% were 65 years of age or older. The gender makeup of the city was 50.5% male and 49.5% female.

=== 2000 census ===
As of the census of 2000, there were 185 people, 76 households, and 49 families residing in the city. The population density was 893.3 inhabitants per square mile (344.9/km^{2}). There were 87 housing units at an average density of 420.1 per square mile (162.2/km^{2}). The racial makeup of the city was 100.00% White. Hispanic or Latino of any race were 6.49% of the population.

There were 76 households, out of which 28.9% had children under the age of 18 living with them, 52.6% were married couples living together, 7.9% had a female householder with no husband present, and 35.5% were non-families. 32.9% of all households were made up of individuals, and 19.7% had someone living alone who was 65 years of age or older. The average household size was 2.43 and the average family size was 3.08.

In the city, the population was spread out, with 29.2% under the age of 18, 7.6% from 18 to 24, 25.9% from 25 to 44, 15.1% from 45 to 64, and 22.2% who were 65 years of age or older. The median age was 35 years. For every 100 females, there were 101.1 males. For every 100 females age 18 and over, there were 98.5 males.

The median income for a household in the city was $32,188, and the median income for a family was $35,500. Males had a median income of $28,438 versus $19,375 for females. The per capita income for the city was $14,332. None of the families and 1.5% of the population were living below the poverty line.

== Politics ==
Okabena is located in Minnesota's 1st congressional district, represented by Republican Brad Finstad. At the state level, Okabena is located in Senate District 22, represented by Republican Bill Weber, and in House District 22B, represented by Republican Rod Hamilton.
