= Riceford Creek =

Coordinates: 43.6880218°N 91.6904241°W

- Location within Minnesota

Location
- Country: United States
- State: Minnesota
- County: Fillmore, Houston

Basin features
- River system: Root River

Riceford Creek is a stream in Minnesota. The river flows over about 20 miles (32 km) from the town of Mabel, Minnesota to the town of Yucatan, Minnesota, where it flows into the South Fork Root River.

The creek is named after Minnesota Territory politician Henry Mower Rice, who forded this creek in 1856.

== See also ==
- List of rivers of Minnesota
