= Watonwan River =

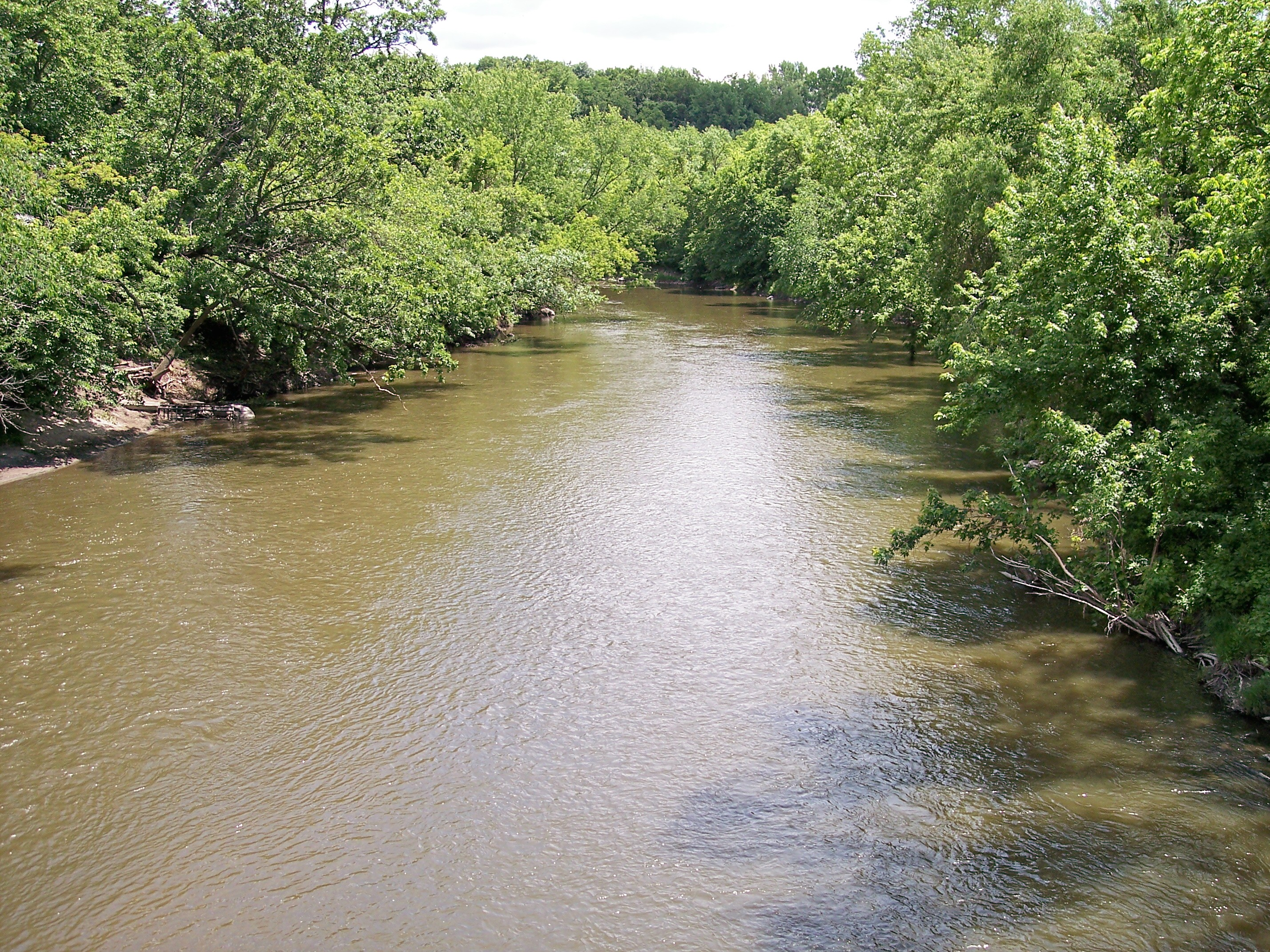
- The Watonwan River in Garden City in 2007

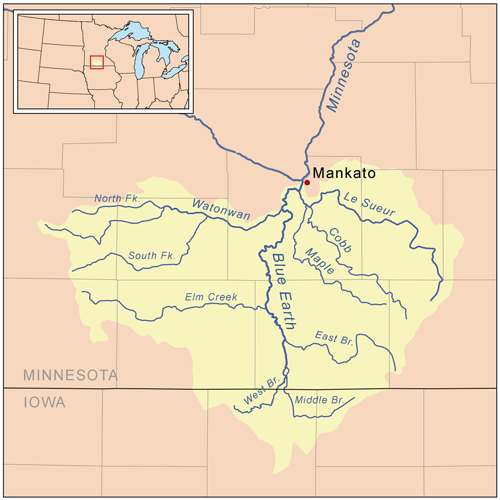
- Map of the Blue Earth River watershed showing the Watonwan River
- Etymology: Dakota watanwan meaning "fish bait" or "plenty of fish"

Location
- Country: United States
- State: Minnesota
- Counties: Cottonwood, Watonwan, Blue Earth

Physical characteristics
- Source
  - location: Amboy Township, Cottonwood County
  - coordinates: 44°01′30″N 95°13′12″W
  - elevation: 1,529 ft (466 m)
- Mouth: Blue Earth River
  - location: Rapidan Township, Blue Earth County
  - coordinates: 44°04′13″N 94°07′35″W
  - elevation: 879 ft (268 m)
- Length: 113.2 mi (182.2 km)
- Basin size: 878 mi^{2} (2,270 km^{2})
- Discharge
  - location: near Garden City
  - average: 391 cu ft/s (11.1 m^{3}/s)
  - minimum: 1.8 cu ft/s (0.051 m^{3}/s)
  - maximum: 13,900 cu ft/s (390 m^{3}/s)

Basin features
- Tributaries
  - left: North Fork Watonwan River
  - right: South Fork Watonwan River

The Watonwan River is a tributary of the Blue Earth River, 113 miles (182 km) long, in southern Minnesota in the United States. Via the Blue Earth and Minnesota rivers, it is part of the watershed of the Mississippi River, draining an area of 878 square miles (2,270 km^{2}) in an agricultural region. The Watonwan drains about a quarter of the Blue Earth River's watershed.

The river was the site of the capture of Bob, Cole and Jim Younger (members of the James–Younger Gang) near Madelia in 1876.

== Geography ==
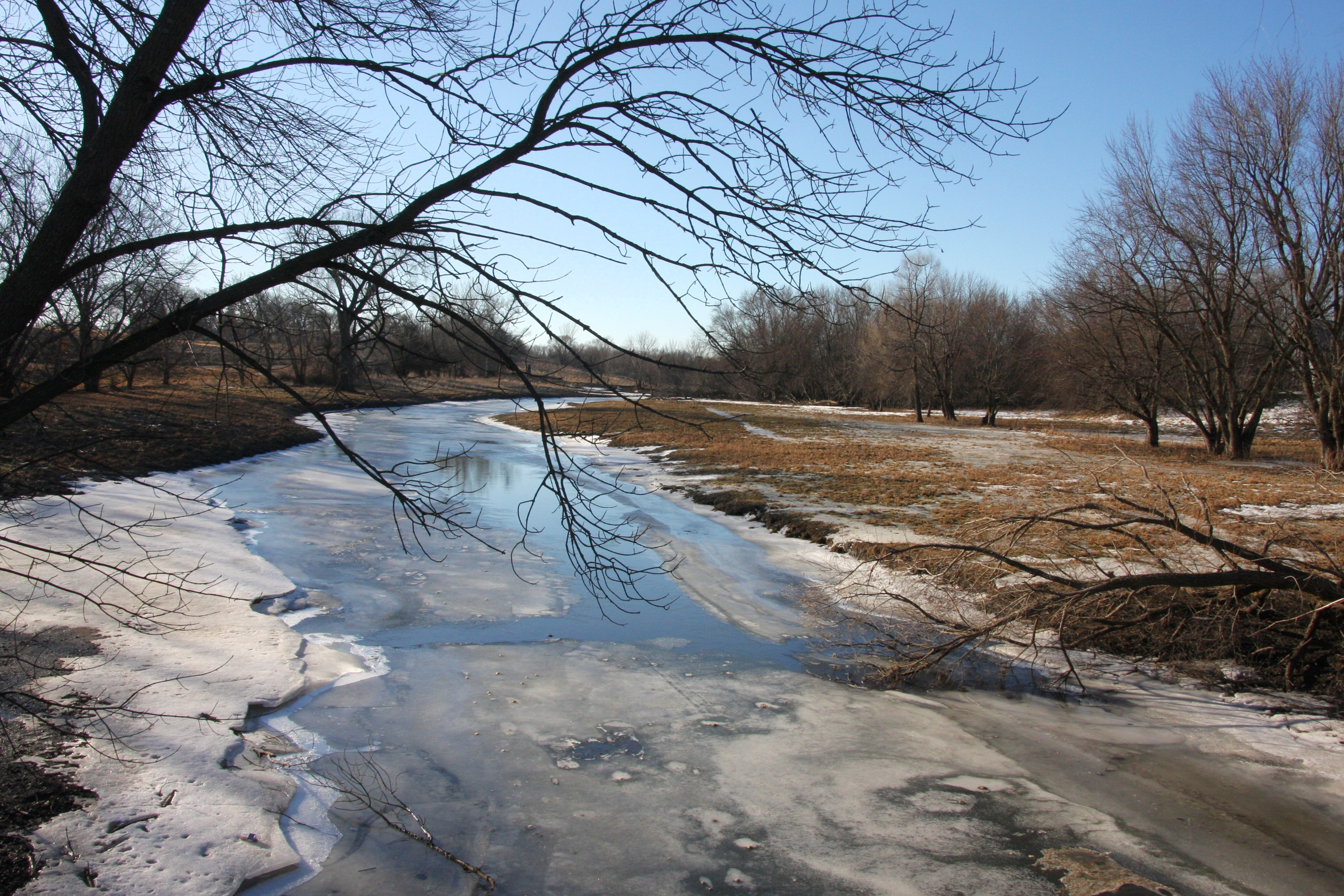
The river in winter near Madelia, Minnesota

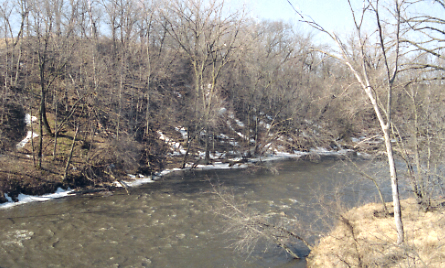
The Watonwan River in Garden City Township in 1996

The Watonwan River rises in Amboy Township, approximately 3 miles (5 km) southwest of Jeffers in central Cottonwood County, and flows generally eastwardly across flat till plains through northern Watonwan and western Blue Earth counties, past the city of Madelia. It flows into the Blue Earth River approximately 8 miles (13 km) southwest of Mankato and 16 miles (26 km) upstream of the Blue Earth's confluence with the Minnesota River.

The river's largest tributaries are its north and south forks. The South Fork Watonwan River, 73 miles (117 km) long, rises in southeastern Cottonwood County and initially flows eastwardly into southern Watonwan County, briefly entering Martin County and passing Odin; then northeastwardly through eastern Watonwan County to its confluence with the Watonwan River upstream of Madelia. The North Fork Watonwan River, 39 miles (63 km) long, rises in Cottonwood County and flows eastwardly into northern Watonwan County, joining the Watonwan River about a mile (2 km) southeast of La Salle.

Approximately 84% of the larger watershed of the Blue Earth River, which includes that of the Watonwan River, is used for agricultural cultivation, primarily that of corn and soybeans. Small lakes and wetlands in the Watonwan watershed provide significant habitat for Minnesota's waterfowl population, though many stretches of the river and its tributaries have been subject to ditching and channelization for agricultural production and localized flood reduction.

== Flow rate ==
At the United States Geological Survey's stream gauge near the community of Garden City in Garden City Township, 7.3 miles (11.7 km) upstream from the river's mouth, the annual mean flow of the river between 1940 and 2005 was 391 cubic feet per second (11.1 m^{3}/s). The highest recorded flow during the period was 13,900 cu ft/s (390 m^{3}/s) on June 20, 1993. The lowest recorded flow, caused by an ice dam, was 1.8 cu ft/s (0.051 m^{3}/s) on December 24, 1989.

== See also ==
- List of rivers of Minnesota
- List of Minnesota placenames of Native American origin
