= National Register of Historic Places listings in Blue Earth County, Minnesota =

Location of Blue Earth County in Minnesota

This is a list of the National Register of Historic Places listings in Blue Earth County, Minnesota. It is intended to be a complete list of the properties and districts on the National Register of Historic Places in Blue Earth County, Minnesota, United States. The locations of National Register properties and districts for which the latitude and longitude coordinates are included below, may be seen in an online map.

There are 28 properties and districts listed on the National Register in the county. A supplementary list includes five additional sites that were formerly listed on the National Register.

This National Park Service list is complete through NPS recent listings posted May 1, 2026.

== Current listings ==
	Name on the Register	Image	Date listed	Location	City or town	Description
1	Blue Earth County Courthouse	Blue Earth County Courthouse	July 28, 1980 (#80001940)	Courthouse Sq. 44°09′49″N 93°59′57″W	Mankato	Courthouse built 1886–89, noted for its ornate French and Italian Renaissance architecture and longstanding role as the seat of Blue Earth County government.
2	J.R. Brandrup House	J.R. Brandrup House	July 28, 1980 (#80001941)	704 Byron St. 44°09′16″N 94°00′32″W	Mankato	1904 Neoclassical house of a founder (1864–1944) of an important private vocational school in Mankato. Also a contributing property to the Lincoln Park Residential Historic District.
3	Charles Chapman House	Charles Chapman House	July 28, 1980 (#80001942)	418 McCauley St. 44°09′19″N 94°02′14″W	Mankato	Circa-1858 house of an early surveyor and city engineer who played a key role in Mankato's initial development.
4	Lorin Cray House	Lorin Cray House	July 28, 1980 (#80001943)	603 S. 2nd St. 44°09′43″N 94°00′20″W	Mankato	Prominent Queen Anne house—built in the late 1890s—of local philanthropist Lorin Cray (1844–1927), patron of the local YWCA and other organizations.
5	Dodd Ford Bridge	Dodd Ford Bridge	December 9, 2009 (#09001070)	County Road 147 over the Blue Earth River; 43°52′35″N 94°11′16″W	Shelby	1901 Pratt truss bridge, notable as a work of Minnesota bridge engineer Lawrence H. Johnson and an example of the flurry of government-funded infrastructure built in Blue Earth County during the Progressive Era.
6	Adolph O. Eberhart House	Adolph O. Eberhart House	July 28, 1980 (#80001944)	228 Pleasant St. 44°09′30″N 94°00′20″W	Mankato	Circa-1903 house of politician Adolph Olson Eberhart (1870–1944), who served as a state senator, lieutenant governor, and governor of Minnesota. Also a contributing property to the Lincoln Park Residential Historic District.
7	Federal Courthouse and Post Office	Federal Courthouse and Post Office	June 17, 1980 (#80001945)	401 S. 2nd St. 44°09′49″N 94°00′15″W	Mankato	Massive federal building built in 1896 and expanded in 1932 and 1965, noted for its consistent and imposing Richardsonian Romanesque architecture of Mankato limestone.
8	First Baptist Church	First Baptist Church	July 28, 1980 (#80001938)	108 Franklin St. 44°02′50″N 94°10′01″W	Garden City	1868 church, significant as a symbol of Blue Earth County's most successful pre-railroad community and as the state's earliest known use of concrete block construction.
9	First National Bank of Mankato	First National Bank of Mankato	July 30, 1974 (#74001004)	229 S. Front St. 44°09′56″N 94°00′15″W	Mankato	The region's most significant example of Prairie School architecture, a 1913 bank designed by Ellerbe & Round. Now incorporated into the Mayo Clinic Health System Event Center.
10	First Presbyterian Church	First Presbyterian Church	July 28, 1980 (#80001946)	220 E. Hickory St. 44°09′53″N 94°00′08″W	Mankato	Prominent Richardsonian Romanesque church designed by Warren H. Hayes and built 1893–96 with Mankato limestone.
11	James P. Gail Farmhouse	James P. Gail Farmhouse	July 28, 1980 (#80001939)	53417 181st Ln. 44°04′01″N 94°08′11″W	Garden City Township	Octagon house built in the latter 1850s, a rare example of this 19th-century architectural fad in rural Minnesota and a remnant of the earliest Euro-American settlement in the region.
12	Rensselaer D. Hubbard House	Rensselaer D. Hubbard House	June 7, 1976 (#76001047)	606 S. Broad St. 44°09′42″N 94°00′18″W	Mankato	Elaborate 1871 house of a successful businessman (1837–1905) who was highly influential in the development of Mankato. Now a historic house museum.
13	William Irving House	William Irving House	July 28, 1980 (#80001947)	320 Park Ln. 44°09′35″N 94°01′19″W	Mankato	Well-preserved Second Empire house built in 1873 by an early Mankato merchant (b. 1821).
14	Jones-Roberts Farmstead	Jones-Roberts Farmstead	July 28, 1980 (#80001949)	51209 Minnesota Highway 68; 44°11′39″N 94°13′13″W	Judson Township	Rare vestige of Minnesota's chief Welsh American settlement, and a well-preserved example of an early Blue Earth County farmstead, with structures dating from the 1850s to 1887.
15	Kern Bridge	Kern Bridge	July 28, 1980 (#80001950)	Township road over the Le Sueur River; 44°06′35″N 94°02′31″W	Skyline	Minnesota's only bowstring arch truss bridge—built in 1873—and oldest road bridge still in use at the time of its nomination. Dismantled in 2020, awaiting relocation to Sibley Park.
16	Lincoln Park Residential Historic District	Lincoln Park Residential Historic District	June 2, 1995 (#95000671)	Roughly bounded by Shaubut, Record, Pleasant, 2nd, Liberty, Parsons, Lock, and Bradley Sts. and Grace and Wickersham Cts. 44°09′29″N 94°00′25″W	Mankato	Large and unusually intact upper-middle-class residential neighborhood of the late-19th and early-20th centuries, with 247 contributing properties built between 1856 and 1930.
17	Main Street Commercial Buildings	Main Street Commercial Buildings	July 28, 1980 (#80001957)	Main St. 43°55′45″N 93°57′20″W	Mapleton	Block of 1890s commercial buildings noted for their coherent design, embodying a peak in the development of the region's "Main Streets" around the turn of the 20th century.
18	Mankato Public Library and Reading Room	Mankato Public Library and Reading Room	July 28, 1980 (#80001952)	120 S. Broad St. 44°09′57″N 94°00′03″W	Mankato	Public library built 1902–3, noted for its association with the Carnegie library phenomenon and for its Renaissance Revival architecture using local materials.
19	Mankato Union Depot	Mankato Union Depot	July 28, 1980 (#80001956)	112 Pike St. 44°10′03″N 94°00′16″W	Mankato	Only intact example—built in 1896—of the railway stations that were instrumental in the placement and development of 13 Blue Earth County communities.
20	Mapleton Public Library	Mapleton Public Library	December 18, 2009 (#09001097)	104 1st Ave. N.E. 43°55′43″N 93°57′28″W	Mapleton	1910 Carnegie library representative of the civic push for public libraries in Minnesota, abetted by philanthropic grants from steel magnate Andrew Carnegie.
21	Marsh Concrete Rainbow Arch Bridge	Marsh Concrete Rainbow Arch Bridge	July 28, 1980 (#80001953)	County Road 101 over the Little Cottonwood River; 44°14′13″N 94°21′40″W	Cambria Township	1911 concrete through arch bridge, Minnesota's oldest surviving example and one of the first built by the Marsh Engineering Company of Iowa, an important promoter of the type.
22	Minneopa State Park WPA/Rustic Style Historic Resources	Minneopa State Park WPA/Rustic Style Historic Resources	October 25, 1989 (#89001663)	Off U.S. Route 169 west of Mankato; 44°08′54″N 94°05′20″W	Mankato	Park facilities with 7 contributing properties built 1937–40, significant as examples of New Deal federal work relief, early Minnesota state park development, and National Park Service rustic design.
23	North Front Street Commercial District	North Front Street Commercial District	July 28, 1980 (#80001954)	301–415 N. Riverfront Dr. 44°10′13″N 94°00′00″W	Mankato	Well-preserved block-and-a-half remnant of Mankato's original commercial district, reflecting the economic growth of a major southern Minnesota city and changes in commercial architecture from the 1870s to the early 20th century.
24	Old Main, Mankato State Teachers College	Old Main, Mankato State Teachers College	June 2, 1983 (#83000899)	301 S. 5th St. 44°09′43″N 93°59′59″W	Mankato	Oldest surviving building, constructed 1922–24, of a state-run normal school established in 1868, representing early-20th-century school design and Minnesota's longstanding commitment to education. Boundary decreased in 2020 due to the razing of a 1908 annex and an auditorium in the mid-1980s.
25	Seppman Mill	Seppman Mill	August 26, 1971 (#71000435)	Minnesota Highway 68 in Minneopa State Park; 44°09′50″N 94°06′49″W	Skyline	Stone windmill completed in 1863, one of the few ever built in Minnesota. Operated up until 1890 when the last of its arms were destroyed by a storm.
26	Sterling Congregational Church	Sterling Congregational Church	July 28, 1980 (#80001958)	County Road 151; 43°53′55″N 94°03′25″W	Amboy	Simple 1867 church, a rare surviving example of Blue Earth County's rural community buildings from the period of settlement before railroad access.
27	Lucas Troendle House	Lucas Troendle House	July 28, 1980 (#80001959)	2nd and Silver Sts. 43°55′41″N 93°57′20″W	Mapleton	1896 Queen Anne house of a local leading citizen, exemplifying the prosperity attained by many who invested in land and commercial enterprises in the region's rail towns of the late 19th century.
28	Zieglers Ford Bridge	Zieglers Ford Bridge	November 6, 1989 (#89001830)	Township Road 96 over the Big Cobb River; 44°01′45″N 93°59′35″W	Good Thunder	1904 example of the pin-connected Pratt through truss bridges once common in Minnesota, and one of the few built by a company based outside of Minneapolis–Saint Paul. Removed in 1995.

== Former listings ==
	Name on the Register	Image	Date listed	Date removed	Location	City or town	Description
1	Adam Jefferson House		July 28, 1980 (#80001948)	November 30, 1987	Cleveland St.	Mankato	c. 1865 Greek Revival house of a pioneer in the local quarrying industry. Relocated to North Mankato in 1987 rather than be demolished for a quarry expansion.
2	Kennedy Bridge		November 6, 1989 (#89001832)	May 7, 2008	Township Road 167 over Le Sueur River	Mankato vicinity	1883 wrought iron Pratt truss bridge. Moved in 2006.
3	Mankato Holstein Farm Barn		July 28, 1980 (#80001951)	September 21, 2007	County Highway 5	Mankato vicinity	1917 dairy cattle breeding barn. Demolished in 2006 after roof collapse.
4	Oscar Schmidt House		July 28, 1980 (#80001955)	September 19, 1988	111 Park Ln.	Mankato	1925 Georgian Revival house of a notable business owner. Demolished in 1988 to expand the Mankato YMCA.
5	Winnebago Agency House		February 20, 1975 (#75000975)	May 15, 1987	1 mi. S of St. Clair on CR 138	St. Clair vicinity	1855 brick Federal house. Demolished in 1986.

== See also ==
- List of National Historic Landmarks in Minnesota
- National Register of Historic Places listings in Minnesota
