= Mapleton Public Library =

Public library in Minnesota, United States

- U.S. National Register of Historic Places
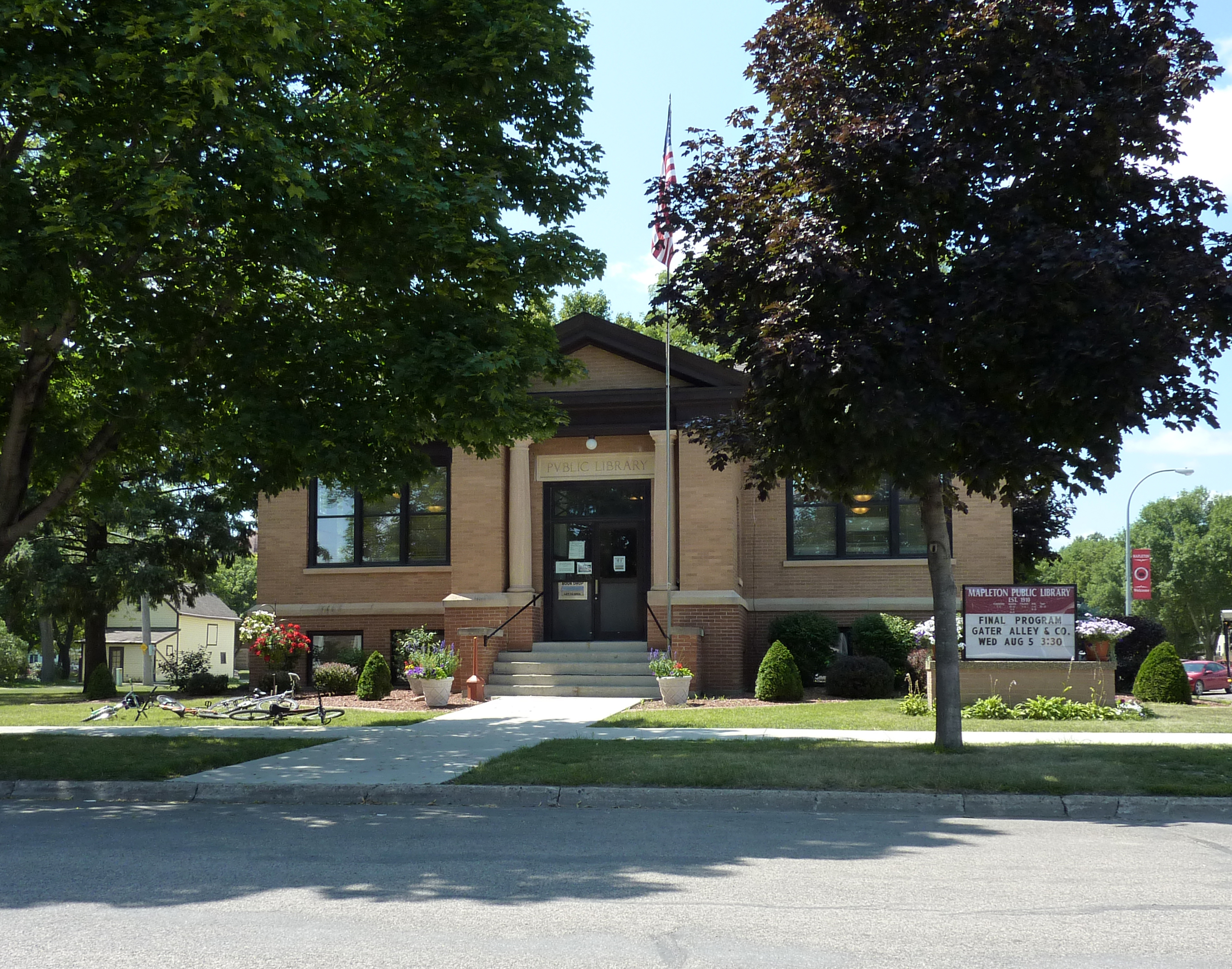
- The Mapleton Public Library viewed from the east

- Location within Minnesota Location within the United States
- Location: 104 1st Avenue N.E., Mapleton, Minnesota
- Coordinates: 43°55′43″N 93°57′28″W
- Area: Less than one acre
- Built: 1910
- Built by: George Ruh
- Architect: Claude and Starck
- Architectural style: Neoclassical
- NRHP reference No.: 09001097
- Added to NRHP: December 18, 2009

The Mapleton Public Library is the public library serving Mapleton, Minnesota, United States. It was built as a Carnegie library in 1910. The building was listed on the National Register of Historic Places in 2009 for its local significance in the theme of social history. It was nominated for representing the civic push for public libraries in Minnesota, abetted by philanthropic grants from steel magnate Andrew Carnegie.

== See also ==
- National Register of Historic Places listings in Blue Earth County, Minnesota
