= Adolph O. Eberhart House =

House in Minnesota, United States

- U.S. National Register of Historic Places
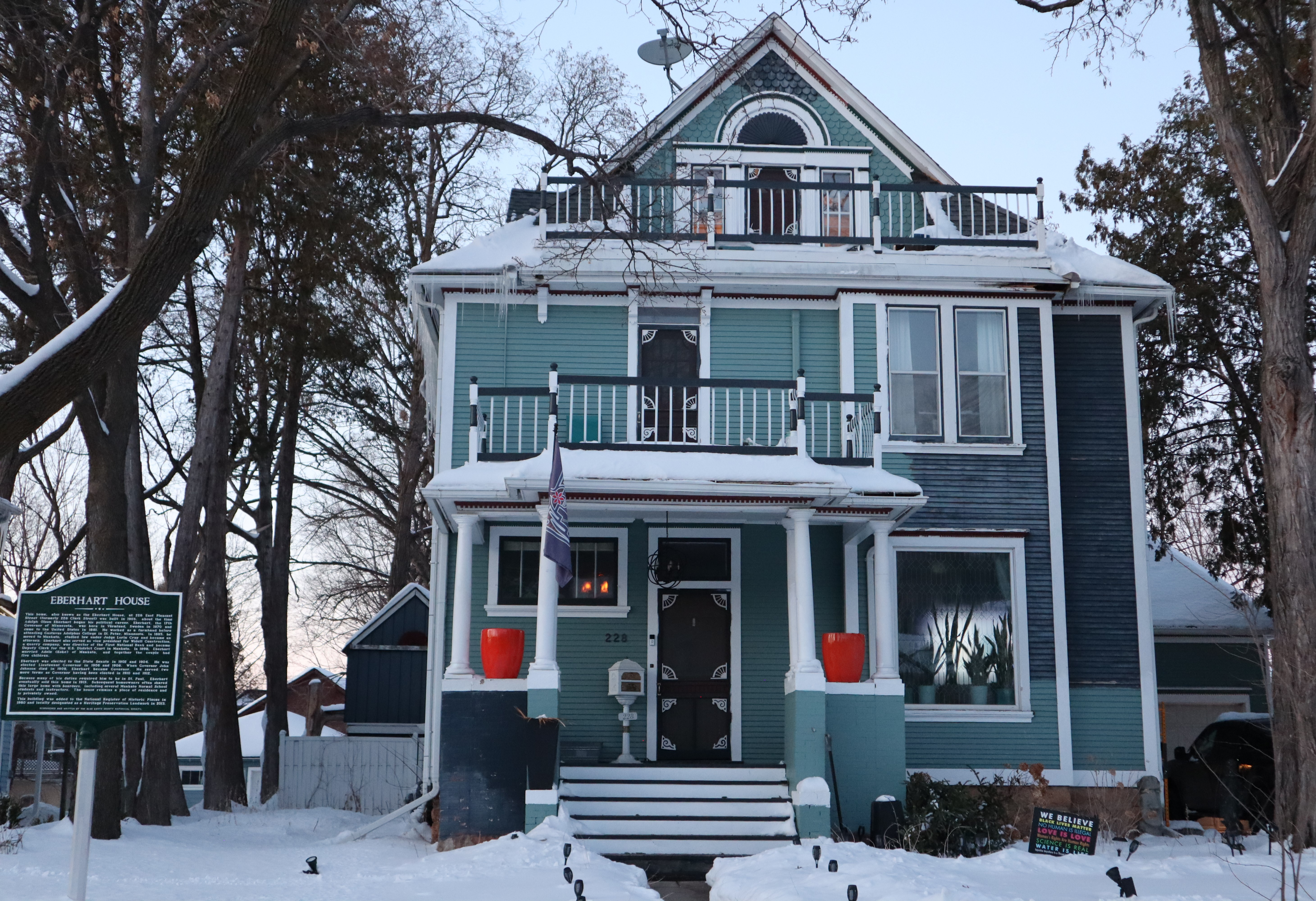
- The house in 2023

- Location within Minnesota Location within the United States
- Location: 228 Pleasant Street, Mankato, Minnesota
- Coordinates: 44°9′30″N 94°0′19.8″W
- Area: Less than one acre
- Built: c. 1903
- Architect: Unknown
- Architectural style: Colonial Revival
- Part of: Lincoln Park Residential Historic District (ID95000671)
- NRHP reference No.: 80001944
- Added to NRHP: July 28, 1980

The Adolph O. Eberhart House is a historic house in Mankato, Minnesota, United States. It was built around 1903 for politician Adolph Olson Eberhart (1870–1944), who served as a state senator, lieutenant governor, and governor of Minnesota. It was listed on the National Register of Historic Places in 1980 for its local significance in the theme of politics/government. It was nominated for its association with Eberhart. In 1995 it was listed as a contributing property to the Lincoln Park Residential Historic District.

== See also ==
- National Register of Historic Places listings in Blue Earth County, Minnesota
