= Charles Chapman House =

House in Minnesota, United States

- U.S. National Register of Historic Places
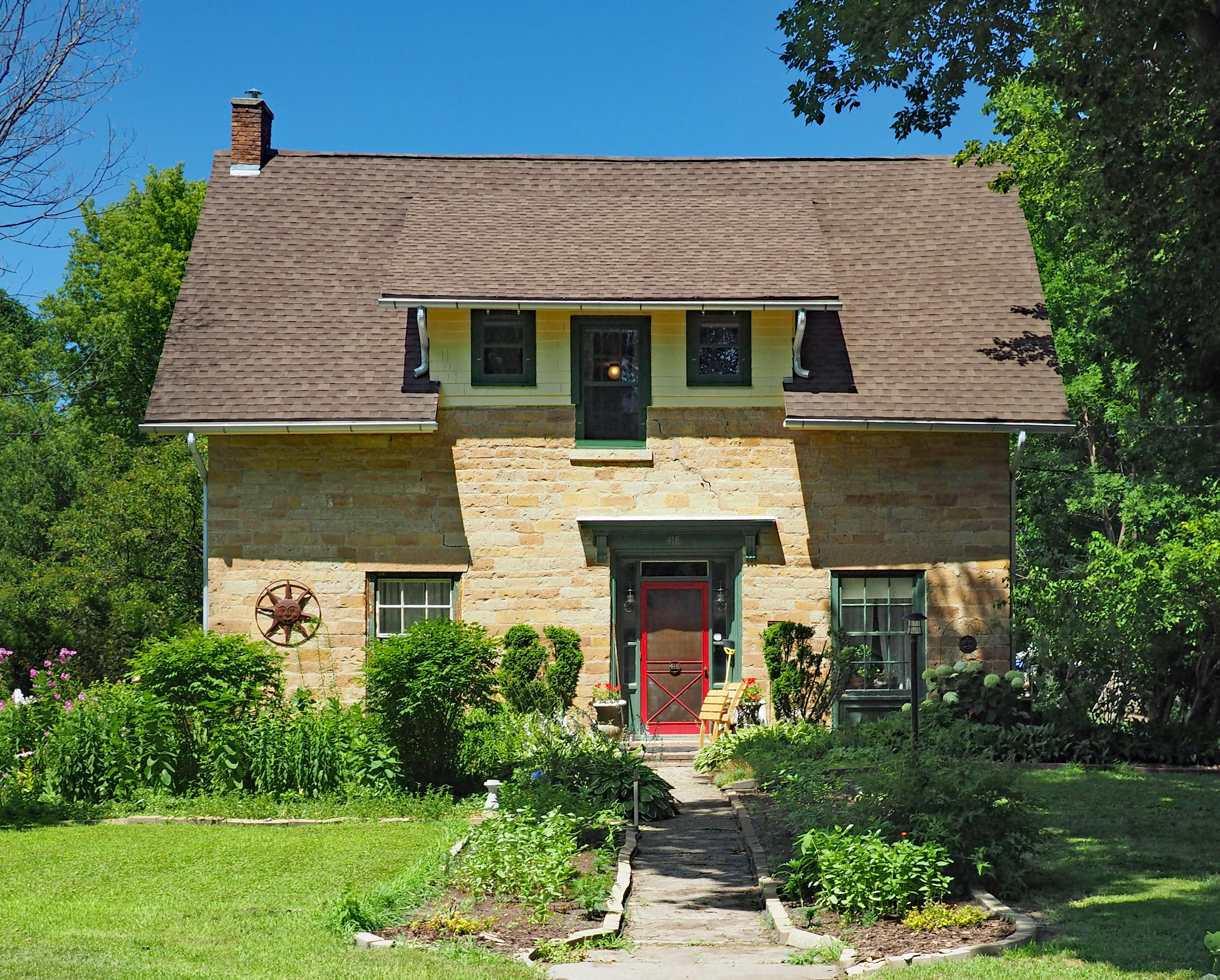
- The Charles Chapman House viewed from the south

- Location within Minnesota Location within the United States
- Location: 418 McCauley Street, Mankato, Minnesota
- Coordinates: 44°9′18.8″N 94°2′14.3″W
- Area: Less than one acre
- Built: c. 1858
- Architect: Unknown
- NRHP reference No.: 80001942
- Added to NRHP: July 28, 1980

The Charles Chapman House is a historic house in Mankato, Minnesota, United States. It was built around 1858. It was listed on the National Register of Historic Places in 1980 for its local significance in the theme of exploration/settlement. It was nominated for its association with Charles Chapman, an early surveyor and city engineer who played a key role in Mankato's initial development.

== See also ==
- National Register of Historic Places listings in Blue Earth County, Minnesota
