= J.R. Brandrup House =

House in Minnesota, United States

- U.S. National Register of Historic Places
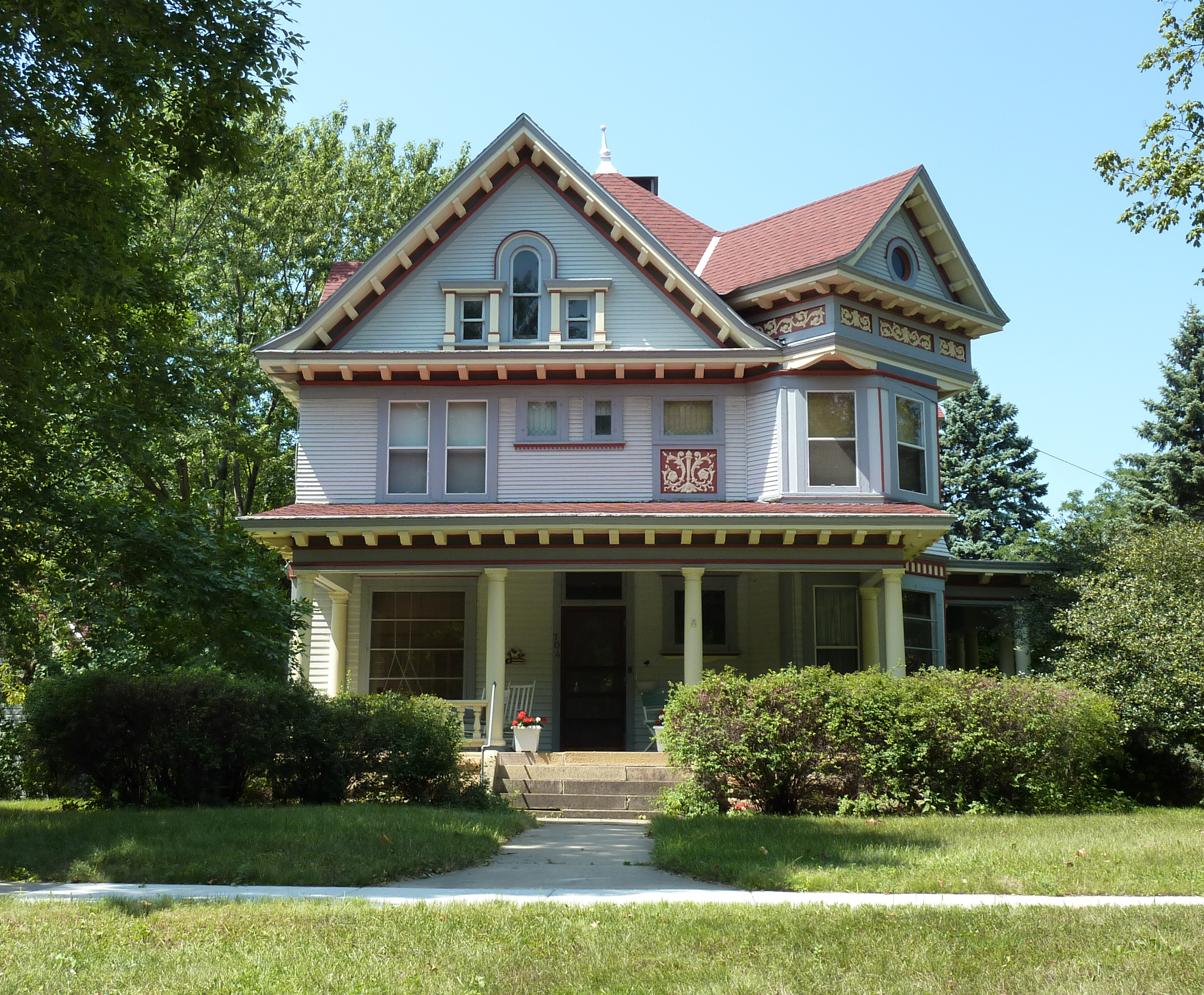
- The J.R. Brandrup House viewed from the east

- Location within Minnesota Location within the United States
- Location: 704 Byron Street, Mankato, Minnesota
- Coordinates: 44°9′16″N 94°0′32.5″W
- Area: Less than one acre
- Built: 1904
- Architect: Albert Schippel
- Architectural style: Neoclassical
- Part of: Lincoln Park Residential Historic District (ID95000671)
- NRHP reference No.: 80001941
- Added to NRHP: July 28, 1980

The J.R. Brandrup House is a historic house in Mankato, Minnesota, United States. It was built in 1904 in Neoclassical style. It was listed on the National Register of Historic Places in 1980 for its local significance in the themes of architecture and education. It was nominated for its association with J.R. Brandrup (1864–1944), a founder of a private vocational school that became one of Mankato's most important educational institutions. The house was also nominated for its prominence and elaborate ornamentation within Mankato's Lincoln Park neighborhood. In 1995 it was listed as a contributing property to the Lincoln Park Residential Historic District.

== See also ==
- National Register of Historic Places listings in Blue Earth County, Minnesota
