= William Irving House =

House in Minnesota, United States

- U.S. National Register of Historic Places
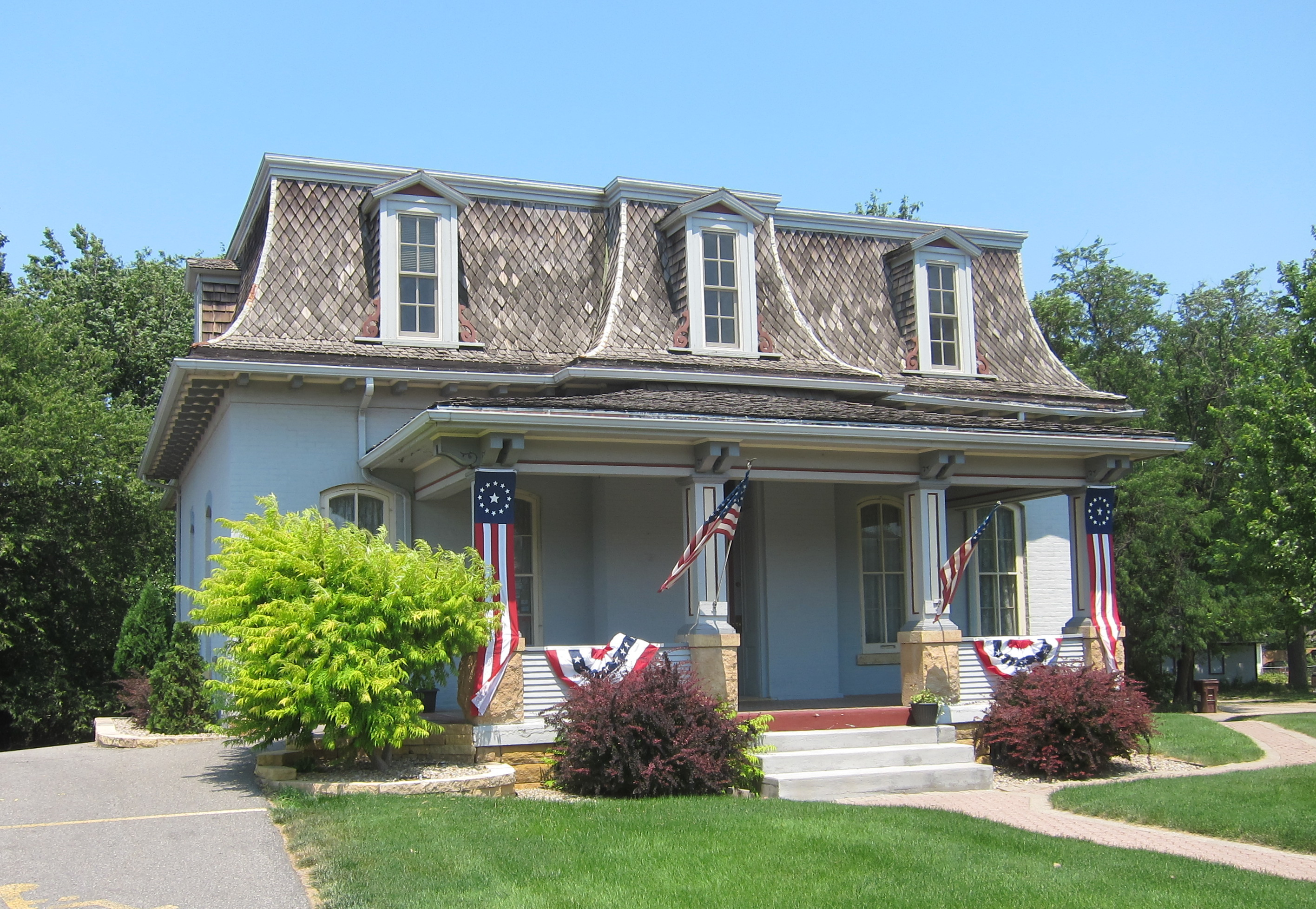
- The William Irving House viewed from the south

- Location within Minnesota Location within the United States
- Location: 320 Park Lane, Mankato, Minnesota
- Coordinates: 44°9′35.5″N 94°1′19″W
- Area: Less than one acre
- Built: 1873
- Architect: Unknown
- Architectural style: Second Empire
- NRHP reference No.: 80001947
- Added to NRHP: July 28, 1980

The William Irving House is an American house in Mankato, Minnesota, built in 1873 for retired merchant William Irving (b. 1821) and listed on the National Register of Historic Places in 1980 for its former commercial significance and well-preserved, locally uncommon Second Empire architecture.

== See also ==
- National Register of Historic Places listings in Blue Earth County, Minnesota
