= Lucas Troendle House =

House in Minnesota, United States

- U.S. National Register of Historic Places
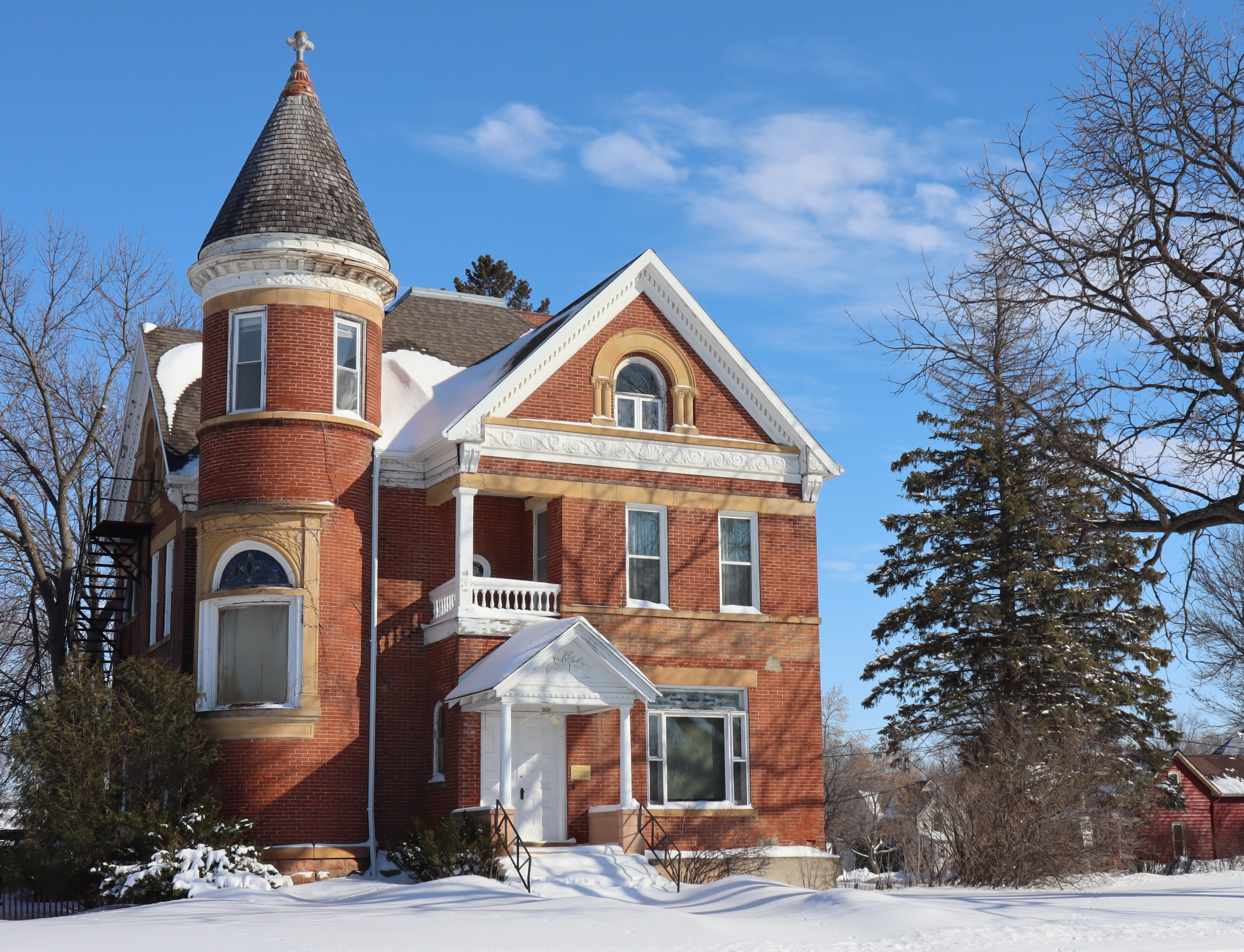
- The house in 2023

- Location within Minnesota Location within the United States
- Location: 2nd and Silver Sts., Mapleton, Minnesota
- Coordinates: 43°55′40.8″N 93°57′20.5″W
- Area: Less than one acre
- Built: 1896
- Architect: Unknown
- Architectural style: Queen Anne
- NRHP reference No.: 80001959
- Added to NRHP: July 28, 1980

The Lucas Troendle House is a historic house in Mapleton, Minnesota, United States. The house, also known as Solie's Castle, was built in 1896 in Queen Anne style. Lucas Troendle (b. 1830) was an early merchant and landowner in Mapleton who became a leading figure in the community. It became the Holt Hotel after Troendle died in 1917.

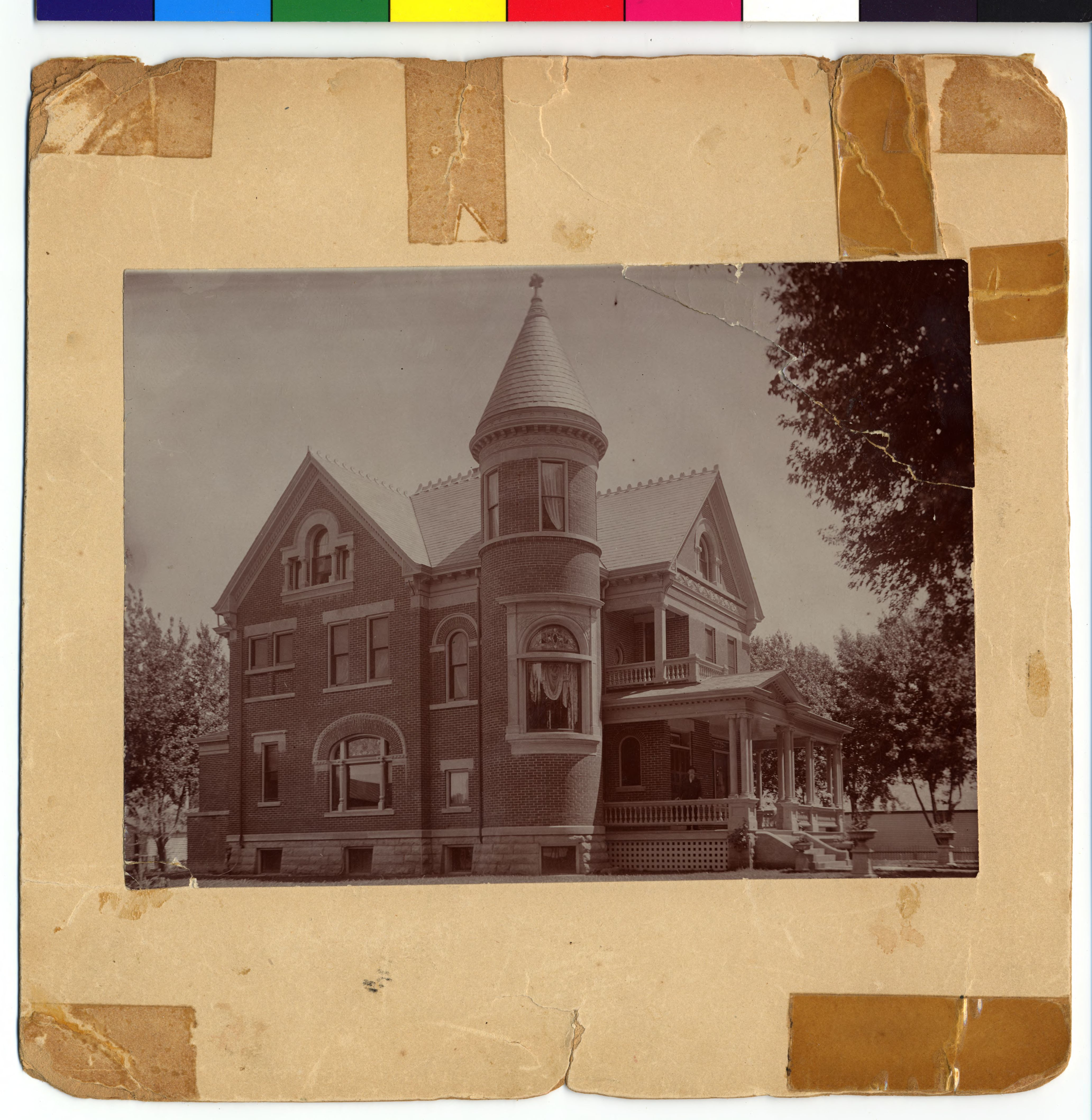
Lucas Troendle home, Mapleton, Minnesota

The house was listed on the National Register of Historic Places in 1980 for its local significance in the themes of architecture and commerce. It was nominated for exemplifying the prosperity attained by many who invested in land and commercial enterprises in the region's rail towns of the late 19th century.

The three-story brick home, with eight bedrooms and more than 5,000 square feet of living space, was sold at auction in August 2022.

== See also ==
- National Register of Historic Places listings in Blue Earth County, Minnesota
