= Campus of Minnesota State University =

College campus in Mankato, Minnesota, US

Coordinates: 44°9′N 94°0′W

The Minnesota State University campus in Mankato, Minnesota currently contains 32 buildings spread over 354 acres (143 ha) and 77 acres (31 ha) of protected ravine. The campus includes on-and-off campus residence communities, academic buildings, libraries, astronomy observatories, center for renewable energy, recreation centers, student center, administration centers, athletics fields, and dining areas. There are 31 dedicated and memorial sites around campus. Downtown, the Mayo Clinic Health System Event Center is used for their men and women hockey teams. Eight miles from campus, the Mankato Regional Airport is used to train Aviation students.

== Campus history ==
In 1868, the Second State Normal School began in rented space by Professor George M. Gage in the Methodist Episcopal Church in downtown Mankato. The idea of a Normal School was conceived in 1858 at the State Legislature, but was sought by local residents long before this. The State began to build a sizeable main schoolhouse building in the Richardsonian Romanesque styling, similar to that of Pillsbury Hall that was later built on the University of Minnesota campus. It was finished in 1869. This building allowed school officials to transition from borrowed space in the Mankato downtown and begin to host collegiate faculty in earnest. This first campus was located amongst the growing edge of the city in the Minnesota River valley. It was during this time that slow growth of additional out buildings was added to campus. This was the beginning of what is now called the Valley Campus.

In 1922, the original schoolhouse building burned down despite being built primarily of locally sourced Kasota stone. In 1924, the institution began work on a Jacobethan Revival style building called the Annex. Over time additional space was added onto the Annex including the larger building now called Old Main. Old Main included many different features such as a student union, the original bookstore, administration offices, the first Experimental School, library and auditorium. The building was constructed again of limestone and Kasota stone and consisted of four floors in a rectangular layout, it included large adornments in the stone with the letter "M" (representing both the city Mankato and the state Minnesota). To this day the Old Main building holds the historic cornerstone along Jackson Street that has a large inscription that reads "State Normal School 1868". From 1924 to 1977 these buildings stood as the social, academic and administrative heart of the school.

As a result of demographic changes after World War II and due large increases in student enrollment. The existing Valley Campus soon became overcrowded. Under the administration of Dr. Clarence L. Crawford, the school began to plan and then construct a new campus high upon the river bluff on the edge of the City of Mankato. The existing Valley Campus could not grow because development in the city had grown all round. The new campus was called the Highland Campus. The Highland Campus was designed at the time to be a modern, medium size campus with room to grow over time. The Highland Campus is the location of the current campus today. It was built using primarily late 1960s modernist style using brick facade with locally mined Kasota stone. As campus operations transitioned up the hill, a tram and buses were used to shuttle students up and down the hill between campuses.

By 1977, the administration had formally moved from the Valley campus. The historic buildings from the early century of Minnesota State were sold or donated to private businesses and non-profit organizations. One such former university building is the current Blue Earth County Government Center, another is the site of Blue Earth County History Center and Museum shared with a VINE senior center, and a third is the site of the Southern Minnesota Children's Science Center.

Today, Old Main sited imposingly survives on a hillside overlooking downtown Mankato. It is now a senior living center. It serves as a reminder of the institution's history and as a symbol of the school's extensive contribution to education in the community and the State.

Current plans show that the university is looking to renew buildings on the current campus by building new centers and removing halls from that period of the 1960s.

== North Quad ==
The North Area of the campus contains a majority of on campus student housing. It also includes classroom buildings in the Wiecking Center, Children's Place Early Childhood Learning Center, the Earley Center for Performing Arts and others.

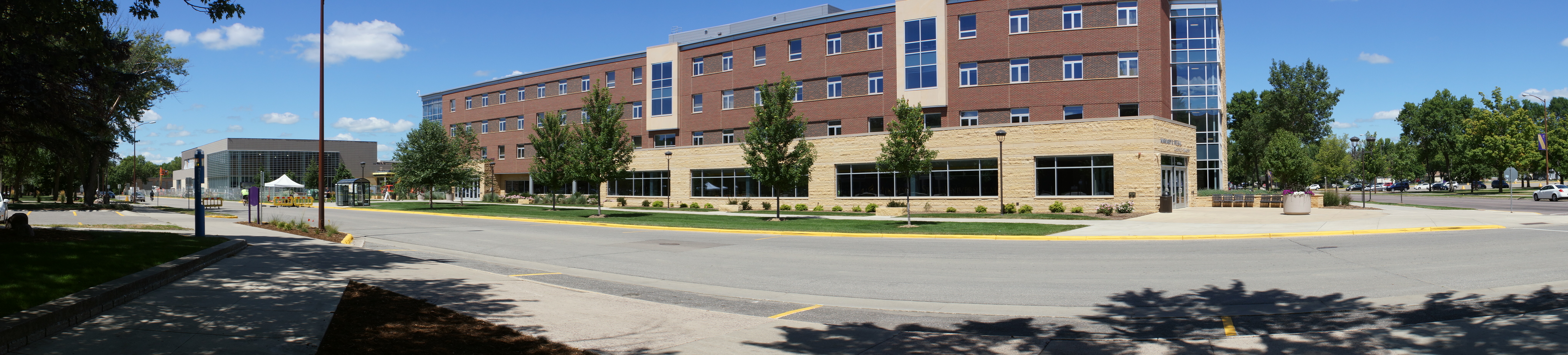
Margaret Preska Residence Hall and the newly built Dining Hall

There are five student housing complexes on or near campus that serve approximately 3,000 students. The five student complexes are:

- McElroy Residence Community (800 residents) – Consists of four four-story halls. All the halls are connected to each other through a central hallway and to Crawford, Preska and Carkoski Commons Dining Hall. As part of an ongoing campus renewal of the north part of campus there are renovations occurring to the Dining and Health Services.
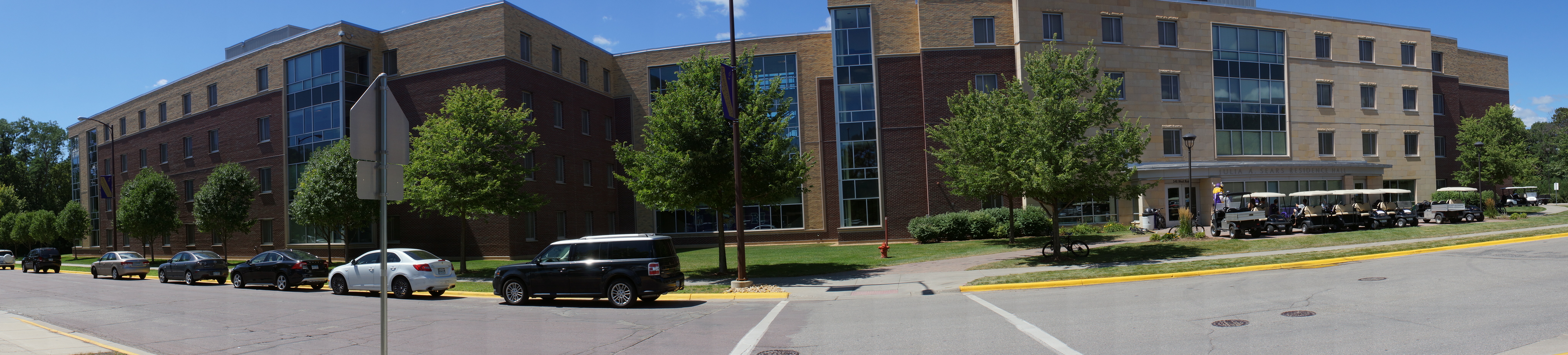
  Julia Sears Residence Hall
  Renovations have been completed in 2012–2013 for the McElroy complexes. Additions included air conditioning.
- Crawford Residence Community (800 residents) – Consists of four four-story halls. The Crawford Halls are planned for renovations in the near future.
- Margaret R. Preska Residence Community (500 residents) – Consists of a single large four-story hall that was recently constructed, and opened in 2012, to replace the demolished Gage Towers at the south-side of campus.
- Julia A. Sears Residence Community (600 residents) – Consists of four four-story halls. All the halls are connected to each other through a central hallway.
- Stadium Heights Residence Community (300 residents) – Are 84 apartment style units adjacent to campus. These were previously a private apartment complex that are leased in starting 2013 to the university to meet the need for expanded student housing.
- Gage Towers – Demolished (600 residents) – Were two thirteen story residential towers that were completed in 1965 that were imploded in 2013 using explosives to demolish the aging structures.

== East Quad ==
The east side of campus is home to the Trafton Academic buildings and the eastern quad that is formed by Trafton North, Trafton East, Trafton South and the newly built Ford Hall Buildings.

== Center Quad ==
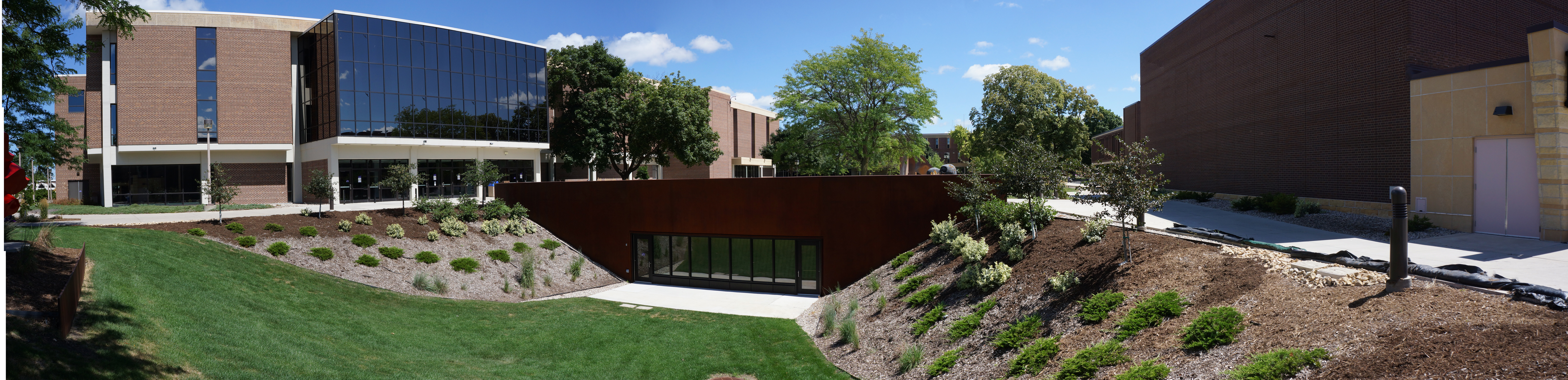
This view shows main Memorial Library to the west, MNSU Amphitheatre in the center, and CSU to the east

The south area of campus includes the Memorial Library, the Centennial Student Union, Wigley Campus Administration, Nelson Hall, Armstrong Hall, Morris Hall and others.

== South Quad ==
The south area is primarily dedicated to athletics and athletic learning. This is area is bounded in the south and west areas of campus adjacent to the Blue Earth River valley riverine bordering campus. Over 50 acres of athletics fields including baseball diamonds, soccer fields, practice football field, and track and field sporting areas. In addition, there are also wind and solar experimental stations on the edge of the Athletics Area where there is more ample space.

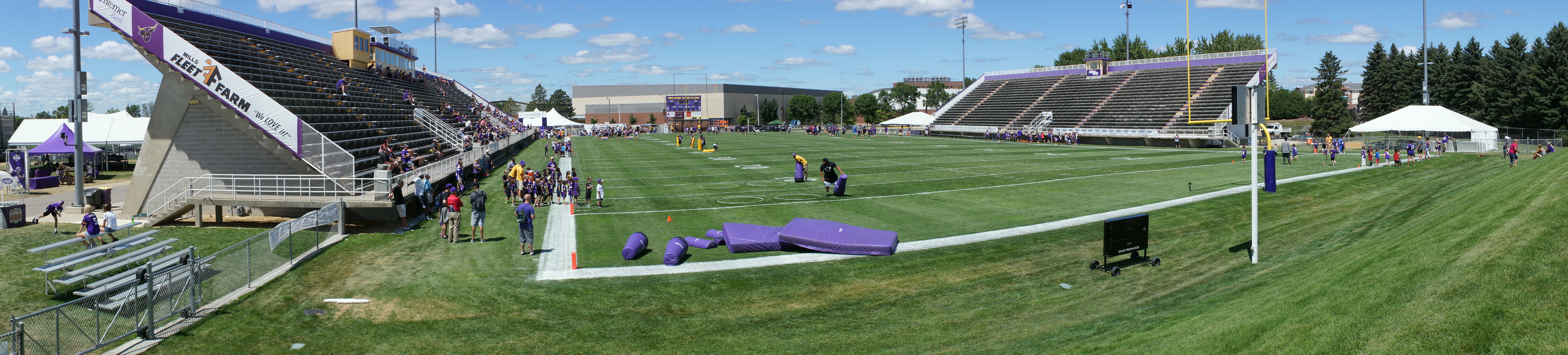
Blakslee Stadium is located in the south of campus and is the home field of the Minnesota State Mavericks Division 2 Football team.

=== Blakeslee Stadium ===
Blakeslee Stadium is located in this area of the university campus and was built in 1962.

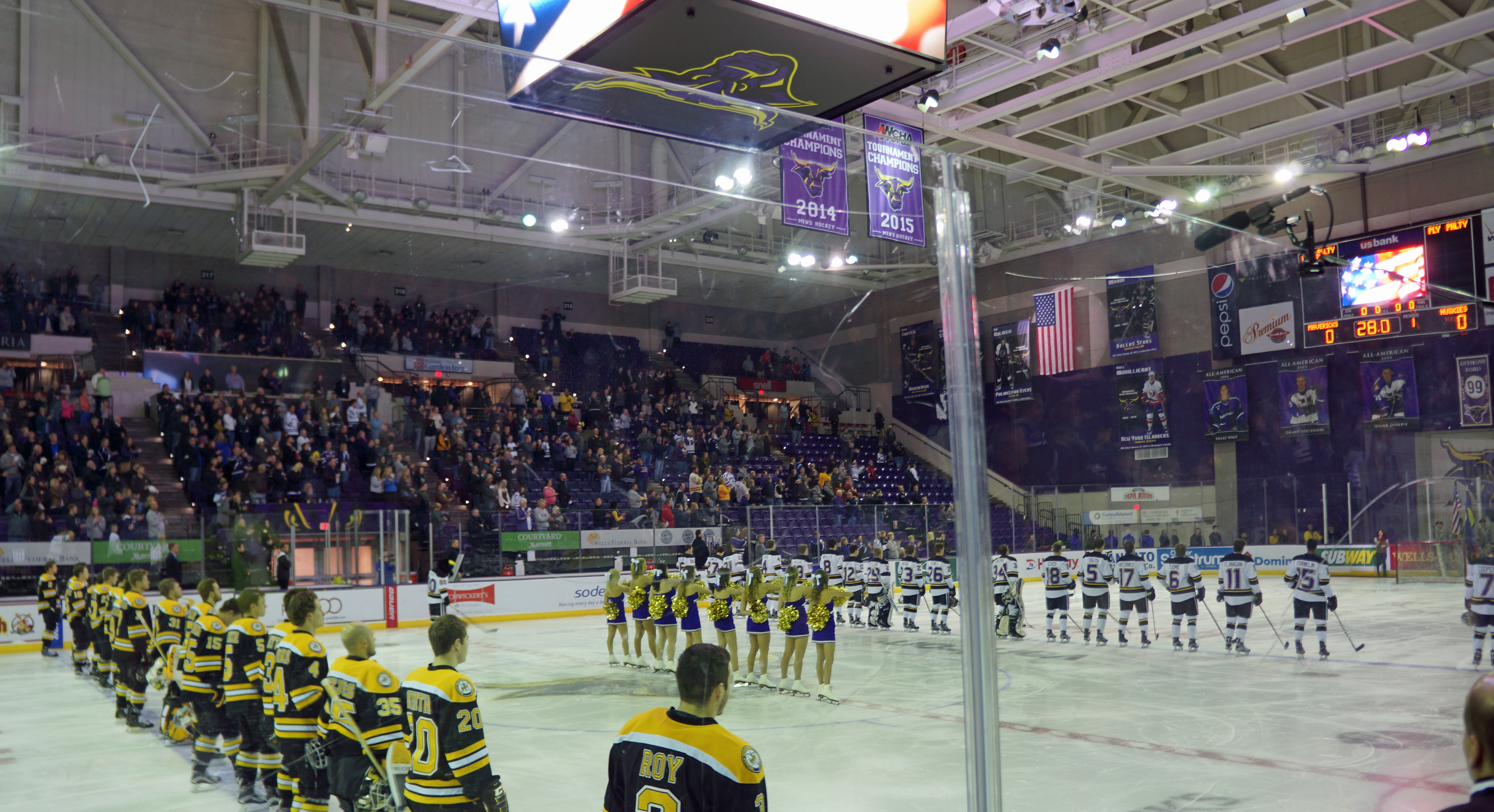
Inside the Verizon Wireless Center Ice Arena before an NCAA Division 1 Hockey Game between the Minnesota State Mavericks and the Michigan Tech Huskies men's teams

== Off Campus ==
There are several off-campus facilities that are used or leased by the university nearby.

- Mayo Clinic Health System Event Center – Men's and Women's Ice Hockey
- Environmental Research Land – Land on the East side of Mankato that is used for natural resources research
- Old Campus Buildings – some of the old campus buildings are also used for special events or fund raising on special occasions

== Transportation ==
The university, the City of Mankato and the Mankato Transit System coordinate transit service for students, staff and visitors along 8 bus lines, as well as intercity transit between Mankato and the Twin Cities on private service via Land to Air Express and Jefferson Bus Lines. The Minnesota State Student Association, the undergraduate student association at Mankato, approved in 2012 a $0.75 cent Green Transportation fee that would allow all students to pay no cost to use the bus system throughout the year. In addition to this, the student association also organizes the Maverick Shuttle a paratransit option and Stomper Express which runs exclusively at night. With the changes to the fee structure for fares, bus ridership doubled in a manner of two years.

Because of the small city context that the university is within, there is parking for nearly 5,000 vehicles adjacent to campus.
