= Old Main (Minnesota State University, Mankato) =

- Old Main, Mankato State Teachers College
- U.S. National Register of Historic Places
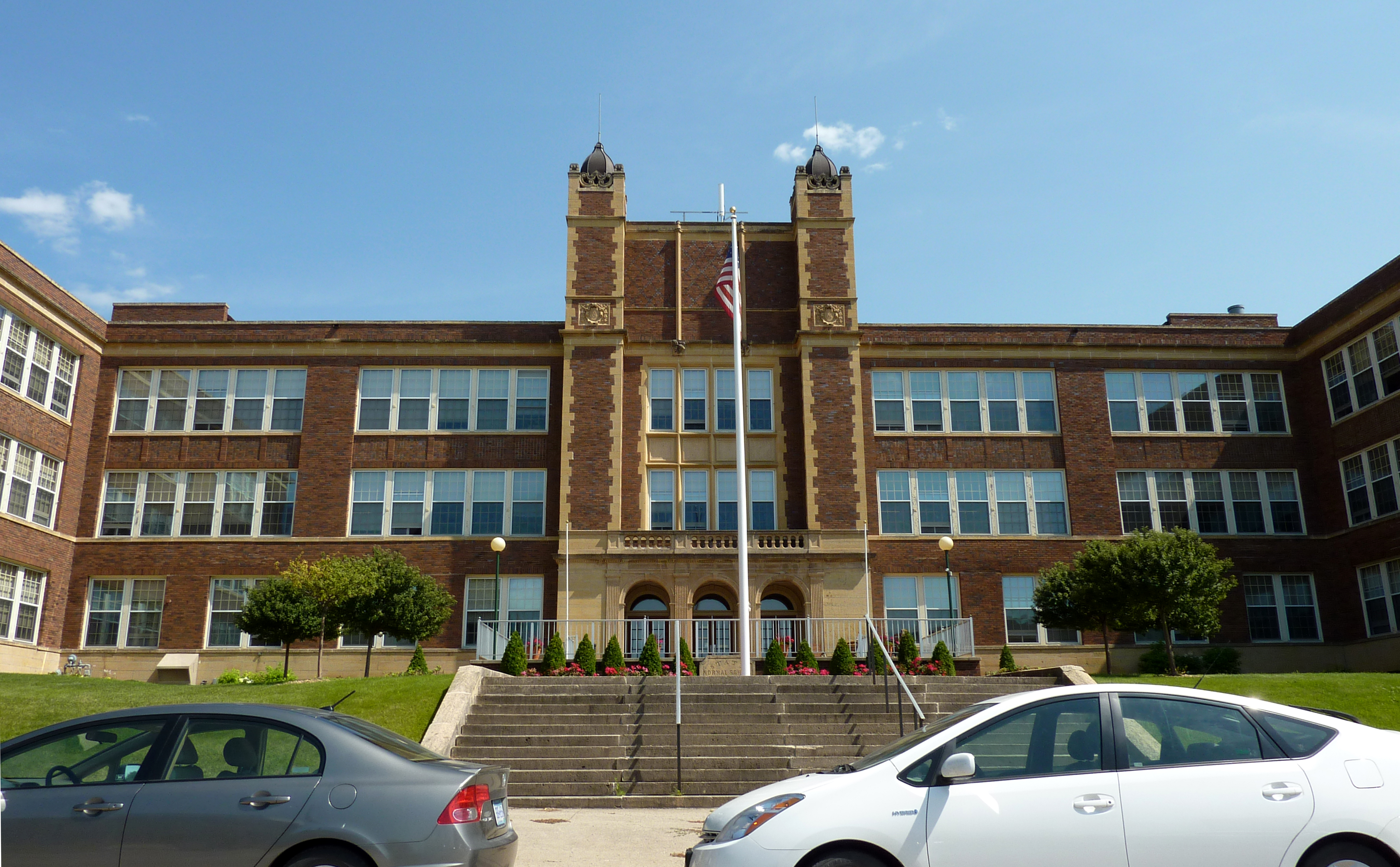

- Location within Minnesota Location within the United States
- Location: 5th St., S. and Jackson St., Campus of Minnesota State University, Mankato, Minnesota
- Coordinates: 44°09′43″N 93°59′59″W
- Area: 5.5 acres (2.2 ha)
- Built: 1908
- Architect: Johnston, Clarence H.
- NRHP reference No.: 83000899; 100005244 (decrease)

Significant dates
- Added to NRHP: June 2, 1983
- Boundary decrease: May 28, 2020

Old Main is a historic academic building on the lower historic campus of Minnesota State University, Mankato in Mankato, Minnesota. Its main section, built in 1924, is dominated by a prominent Jacobethan tower, and is connected to an older 1908 building, now known as the Annex. It was built to replace the original old main (built 1870) also located in lower Mankato that was burned to the ground by a fire in 1922.

These structures are the oldest surviving buildings on the original valley campus, which was the first site of the state's second normal school. The state legislature provided funding in 1923 for the development of the site. The 1924 building was designed by Clarence H. Johnston, then the state architect.

Since June of 1988, it serves as a nursing home and clinical rotation site for nursing assistant programs in the area.

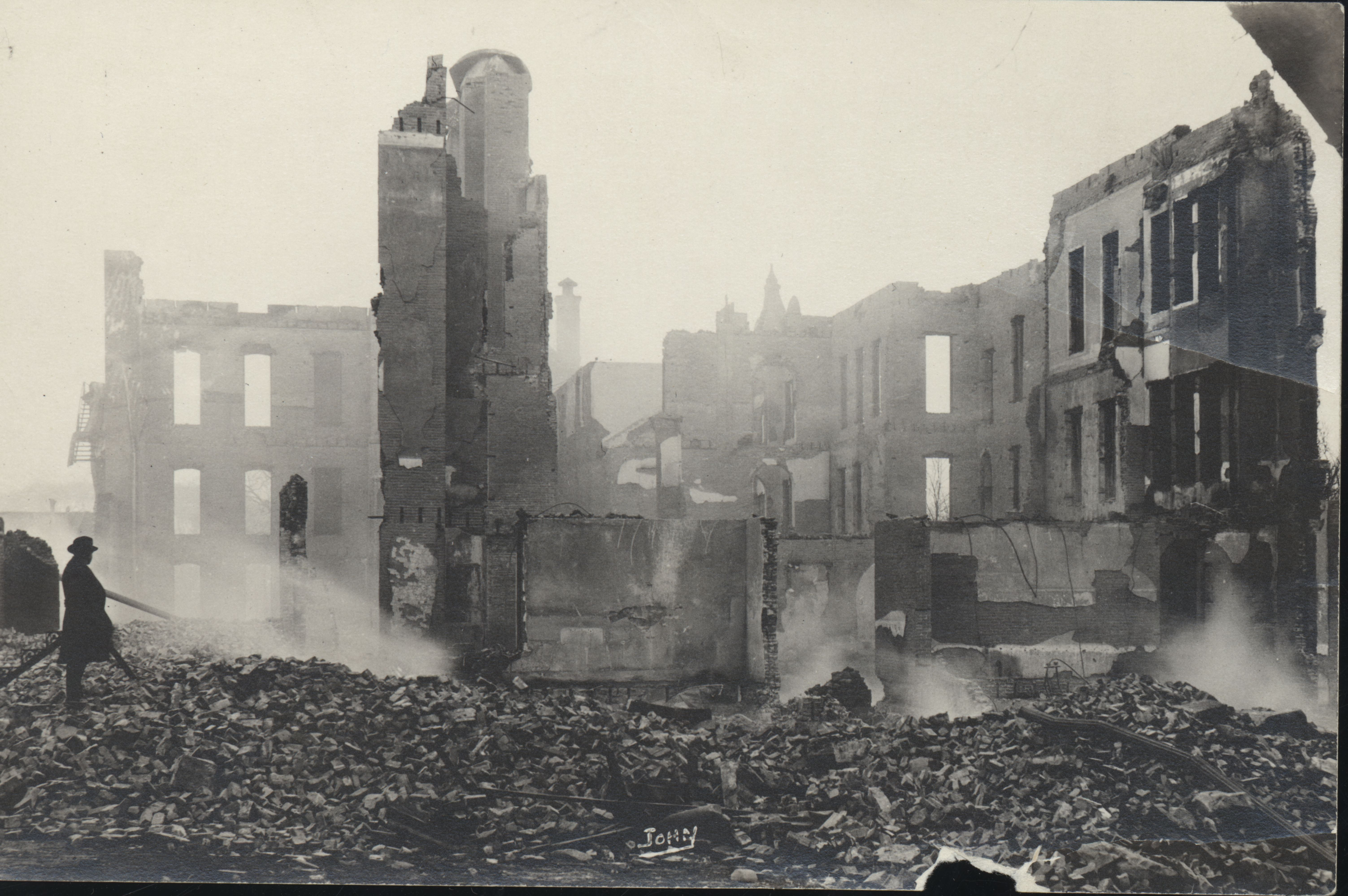
Old Main fire, February 5, 1922

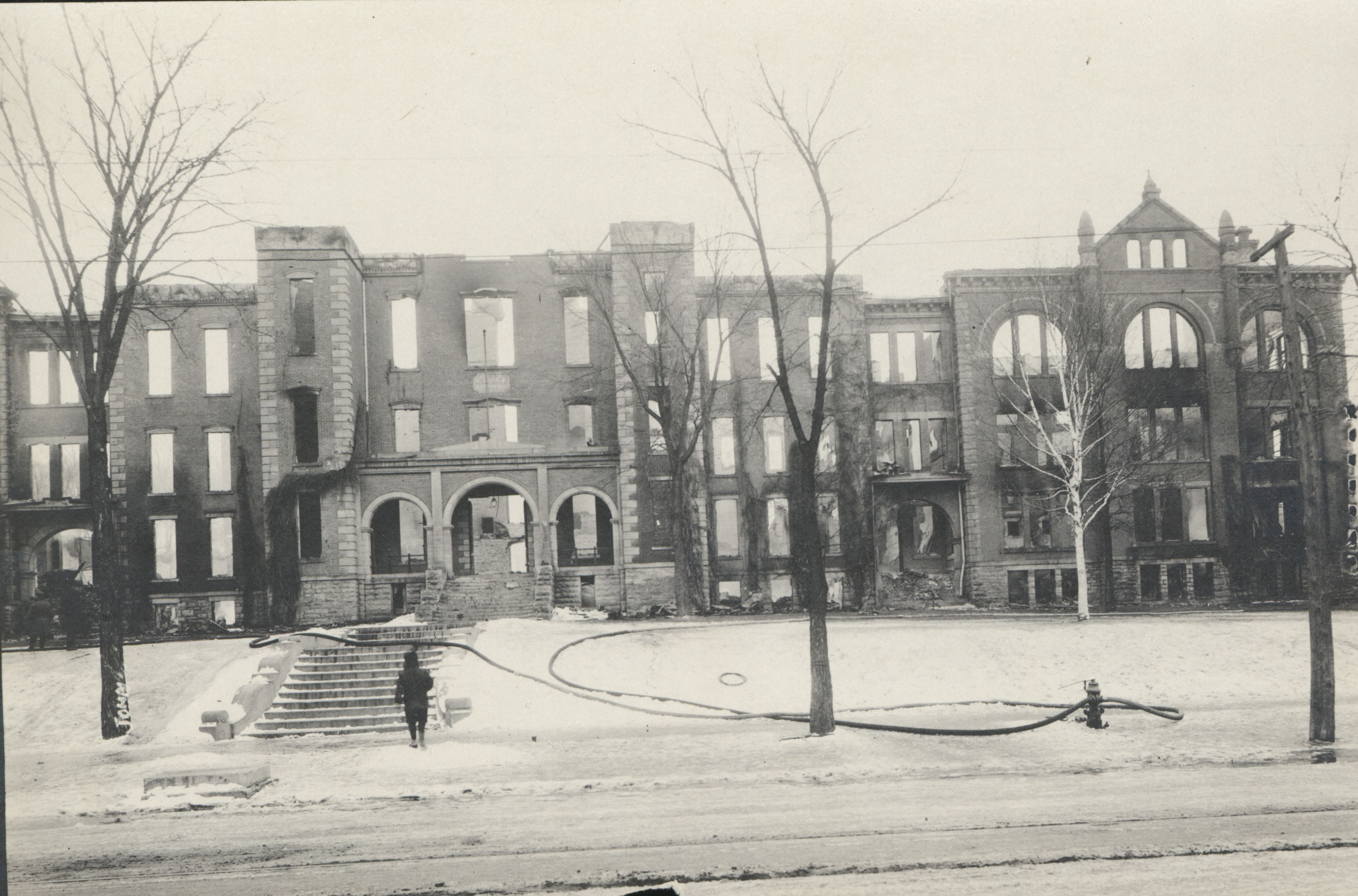
Old Main after the fire

The building was listed on the National Register of Historic Places in 1983.

== See also ==
- National Register of Historic Places listings in Blue Earth County, Minnesota
