= Garden City, Minnesota =

Unincorporated community in Minnesota, US

Garden City
- Census-designated place (CDP) & Unincorporated community
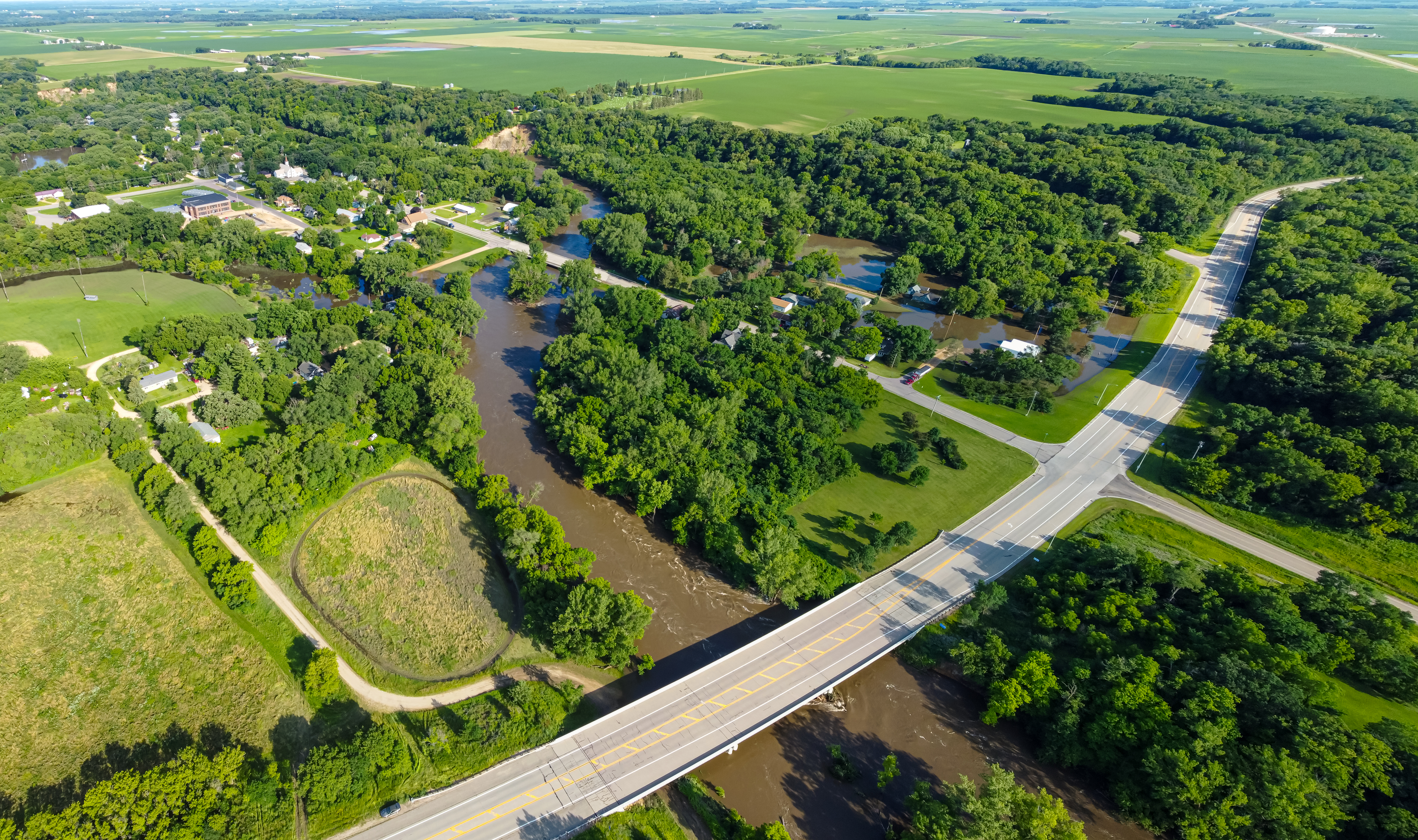
- Garden City during major flooding in 2024

- Location within Minnesota
- Coordinates: 44°02′54″N 94°10′17″W
- Country: United States
- State: Minnesota
- County: Blue Earth County
- Township: Garden City Township

Area
  - Total: 1.89 sq mi (4.89 km^{2})
  - Land: 1.80 sq mi (4.65 km^{2})
  - Water: 0.093 sq mi (0.24 km^{2})
- Elevation: 912 ft (278 m)

Population (2020)
  - Total: 339
  - Density: 188.9/sq mi (72.95/km^{2})
- Time zone: UTC-6 (Central (CST))
  - Summer (DST): UTC-5 (CDT)
- Area code: 507
- GNIS feature ID: 2628679

Garden City is an unincorporated community and census-designated place (CDP) in Garden City Township, Blue Earth County, Minnesota, United States. As of the 2020 census, Garden City had a population of 339.

== History ==
Historical population
Census	Pop.	Note	%±
1870	368		—
1880	293		−20.4%
2010	255		—
2020	339		32.9%
U.S. Decennial Census

A post office called Garden City was established in 1857.

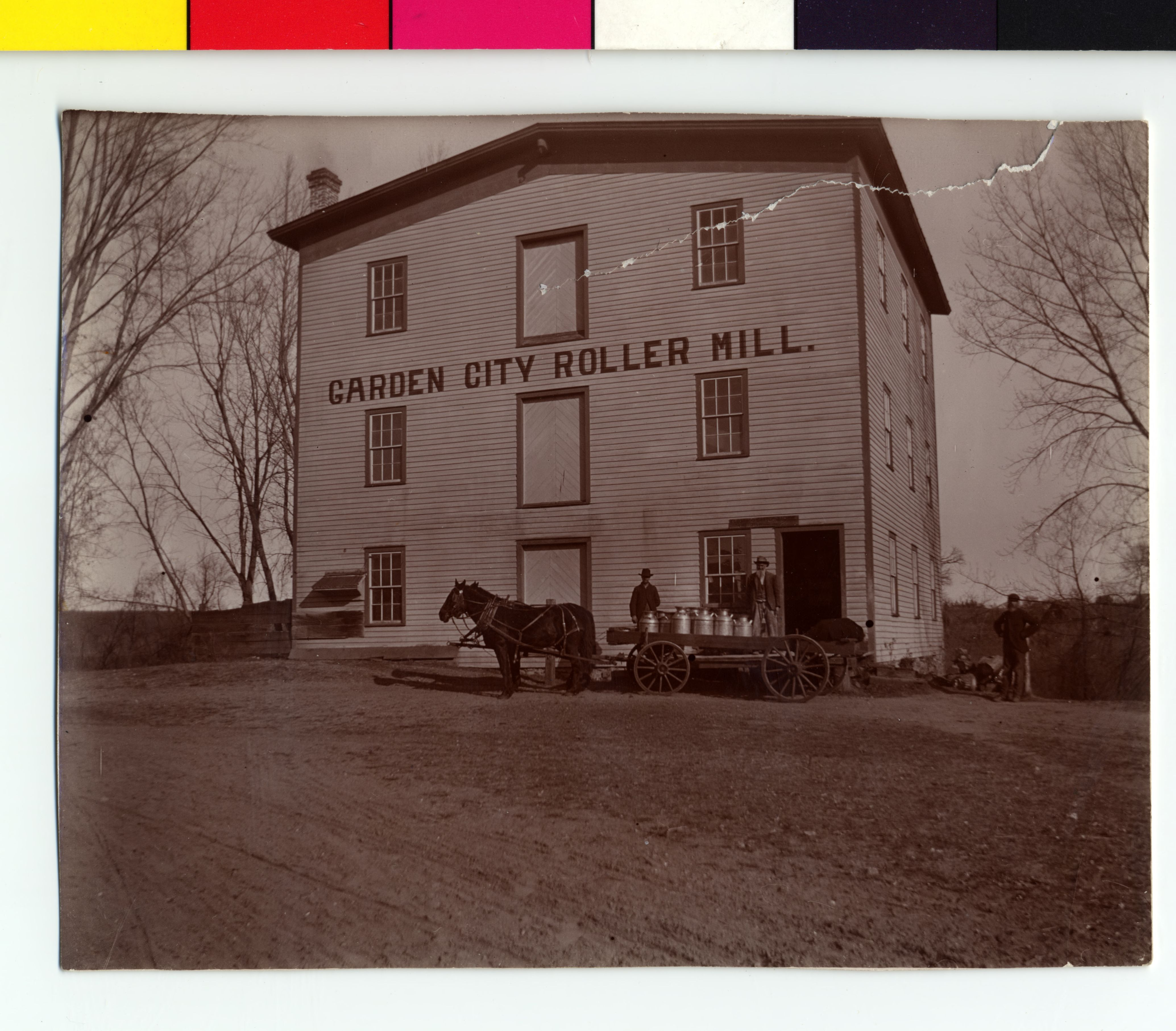
Garden City Roller Mill, Garden City, Minnesota

The community was named from the garden-like setting of the original town site. The First Baptist Church building was completed in 1868.

The Blue Earth County Fair has been held in Garden City since 1860 with the exception of a few years the fair was cancelled.

In 1921, on a visit from London, Henry Wellcome donated land he had purchased to the hamlet of Garden City to build a consolidated school. The school that was built on the site became Wellcome Memorial school, eventually combining with Rapidan, Vernon Center, and Lake Crystal school districts. The building now serves as the site of Wellcome Manor Family Services.

== Notable person ==
- Henry Wellcome (1853–1936), pharmaceutical entrepreneur
