= First Baptist Church (Garden City, Minnesota) =

Historic church in Minnesota, United States

- U.S. National Register of Historic Places
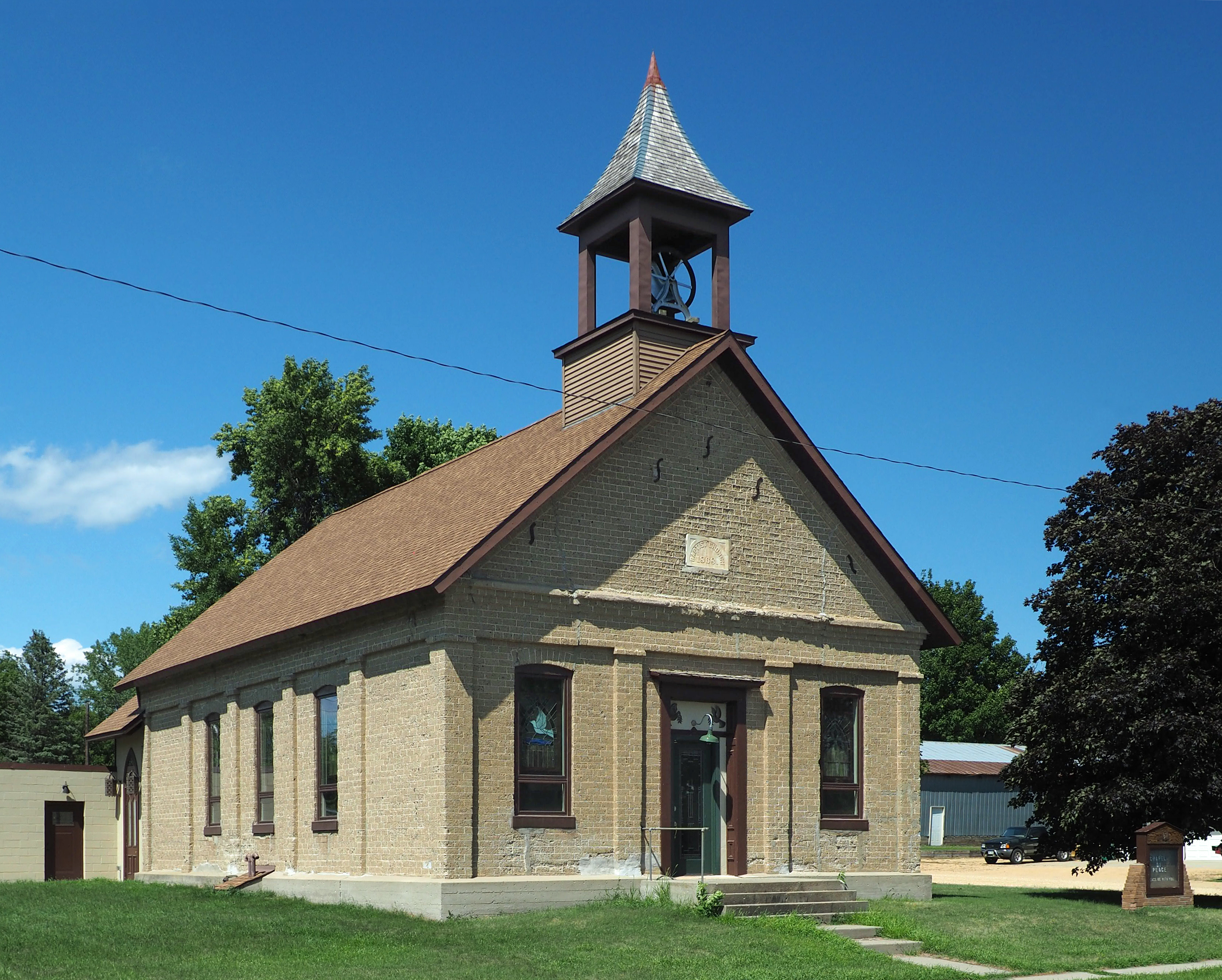
- First Baptist Church viewed from the southwest

- Location within Minnesota Location within the United States
- Location: 108 Franklin St., Garden City, Minnesota
- Coordinates: 44°2′51″N 94°10′0″W
- Area: less than one acre
- Built: 1868
- Architectural style: Greek Revival
- MPS: Blue Earth County MRA
- NRHP reference No.: 80001938
- Added to NRHP: July 28, 1980

First Baptist Church is a historic church in Garden City, Minnesota, United States. The town, along the Watonwan River, was originally established in 1856 as Fremont. A Baptist congregation was formed in the community in 1858, and eight years later, the church was formally organized. In 1867, the membership split amidst a disagreement between members who wanted a more aggressive evangelical mission and members who wanted the status quo. One of the groups moved ahead with plans to build a church, contracting for the delivery of logs to a nearby sawmill. The sawmill was unable to receive the logs before winter came, though, and the logs were washed away in spring flooding.

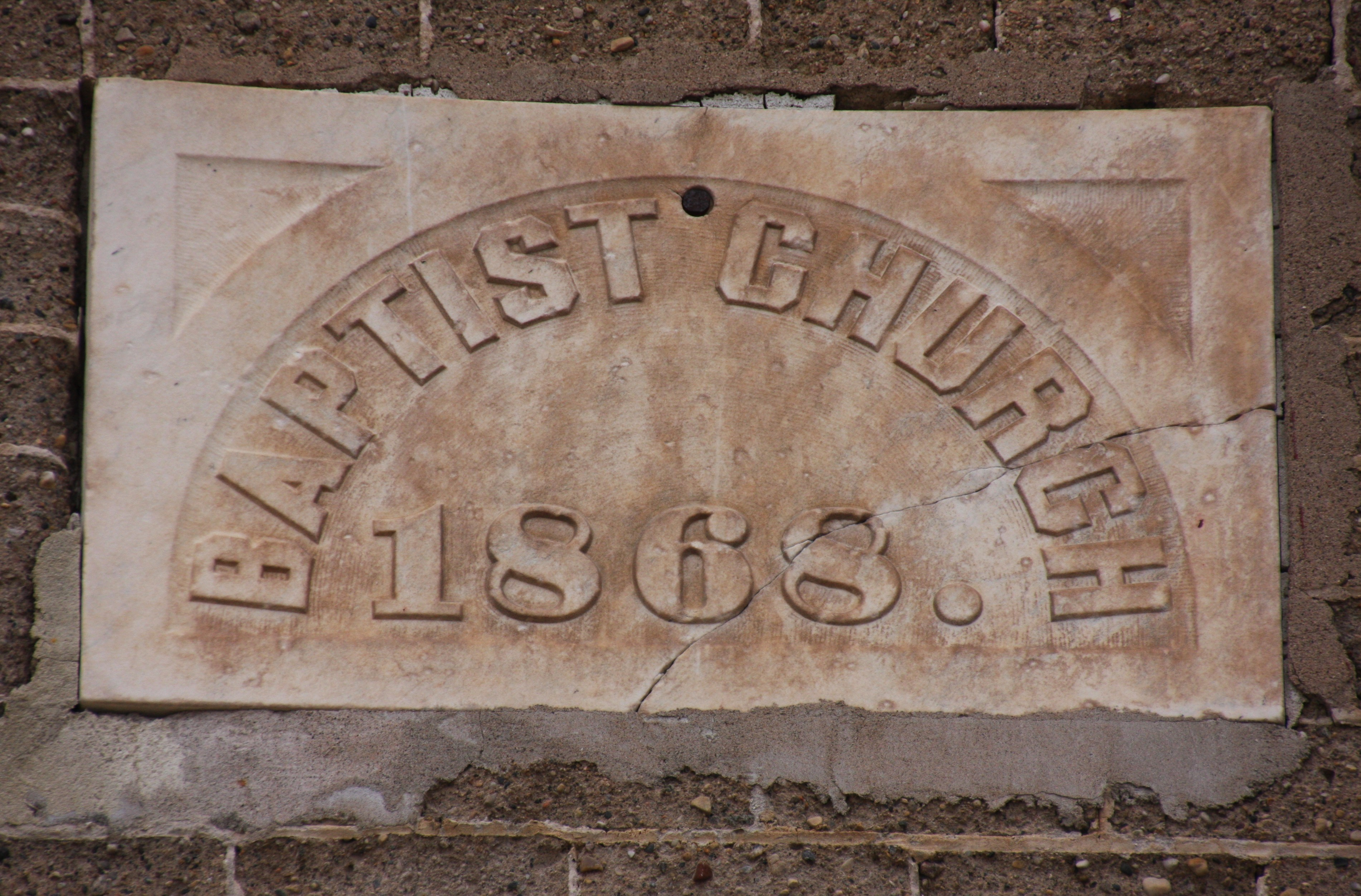
The capstone with the year 1868

The congregation then made plans to build a church from concrete blocks made in the town by the firm of Geist and Hentzelman. This structure is believed to be the earliest in the state built of concrete block or artificial stone. The structure was dedicated on January 17, 1869, and the two groups reunited and used it jointly. It measures 33 feet (10 m) by 55 feet (17 m) and was completed at a cost of $4,100.

Congregationalists and Presbyterians also held services in this building for a time as a combined congregation.

It was listed on the National Register of Historic Places in 1980.
