= Mapleton, Minnesota =

City in Minnesota, United States

Mapleton
- City
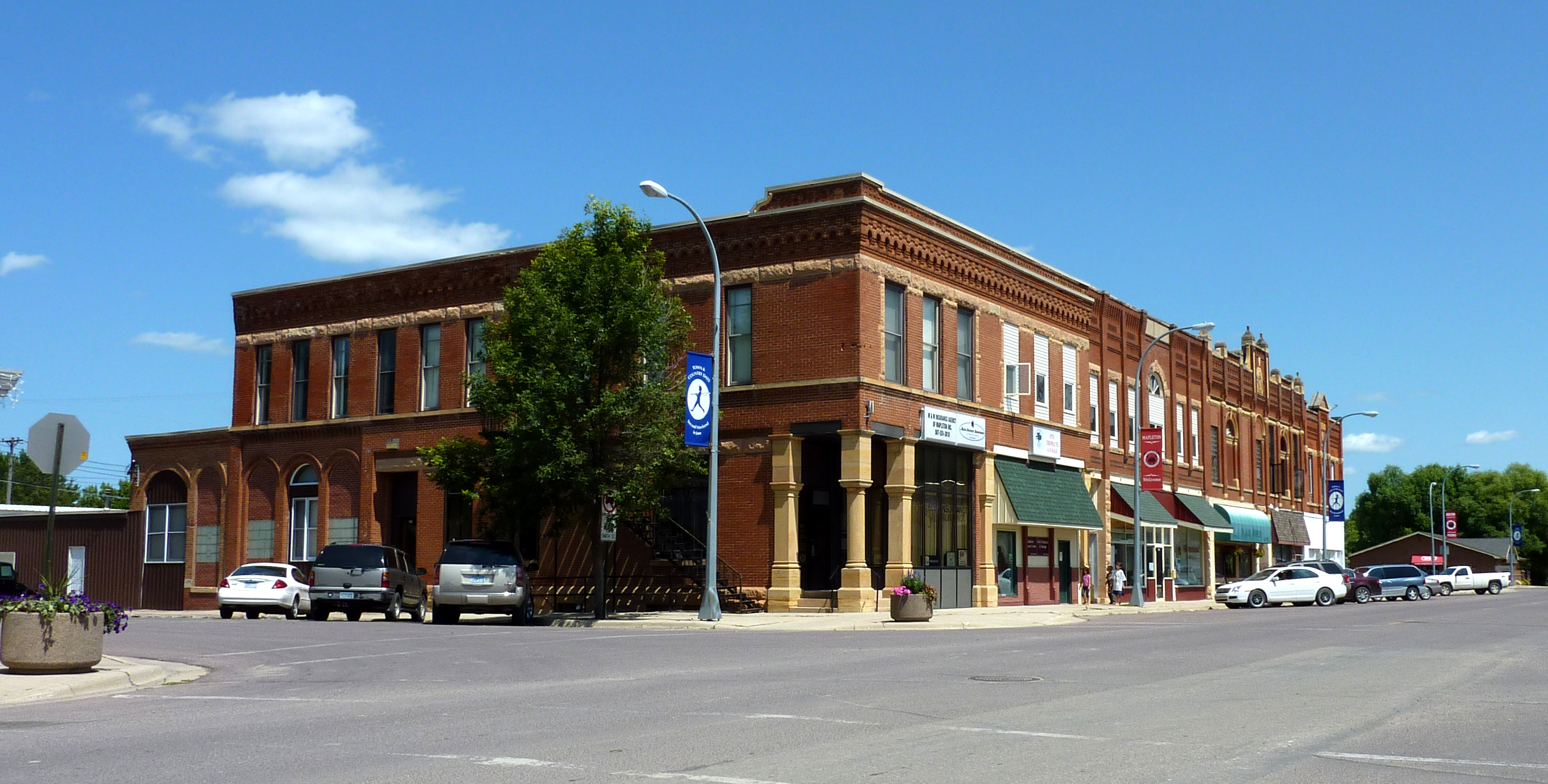
- The Main Street Commercial Buildings district is on the National Register of Historic Places
- Nickname: Curling Capital of Southern Minnesota
- Location of Mapleton, Minnesota
- Coordinates: 43°55′36″N 93°57′17″W
- Country: United States
- State: Minnesota
- County: Blue Earth
- Founded: 1871

Government
  - Type: Mayor - Council
  - Mayor: John Hollerich

Area
  - Total: 1.37 sq mi (3.55 km^{2})
  - Land: 1.37 sq mi (3.54 km^{2})
  - Water: 0.0039 sq mi (0.01 km^{2})
- Elevation: 1,037 ft (316 m)

Population (2020)
  - Total: 1,710
  - Estimate (2021): 1,687
  - Density: 1,250.9/sq mi (482.97/km^{2})
- Time zone: UTC-6 (CST)
  - Summer (DST): UTC-5 (CDT)
- ZIP code: 56065
- Area code: 507
- FIPS code: 27-40310
- GNIS feature ID: 2395842
- Website: www.mapletonmn.gov

Mapleton is a city in Blue Earth County, Minnesota, United States. The population was 1,710 at the 2020 census. It is part of the Mankato, MN Metropolitan Statistical Area.

== History ==
Mapleton was platted at its current site in 1871 when the railroad was extended to that point.

== Geography ==
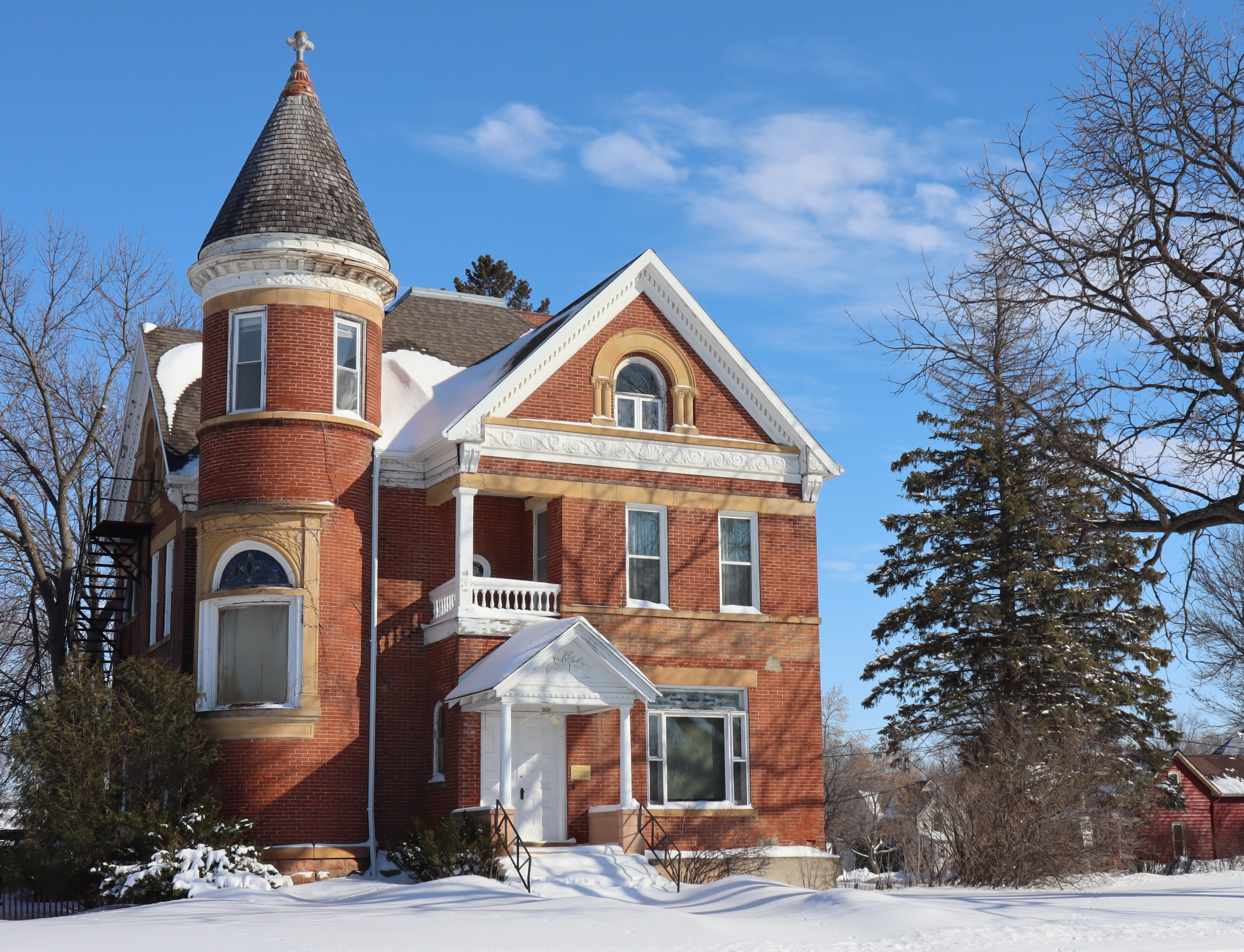
The Lucas Troendle House is on the National Register of Historic Places.

According to the United States Census Bureau, the city has a total area of 1.46 square miles (3.78 km^{2}), all land.

Minnesota State Highways 22 and 30 are two of the main routes in the city.

== Demographics ==
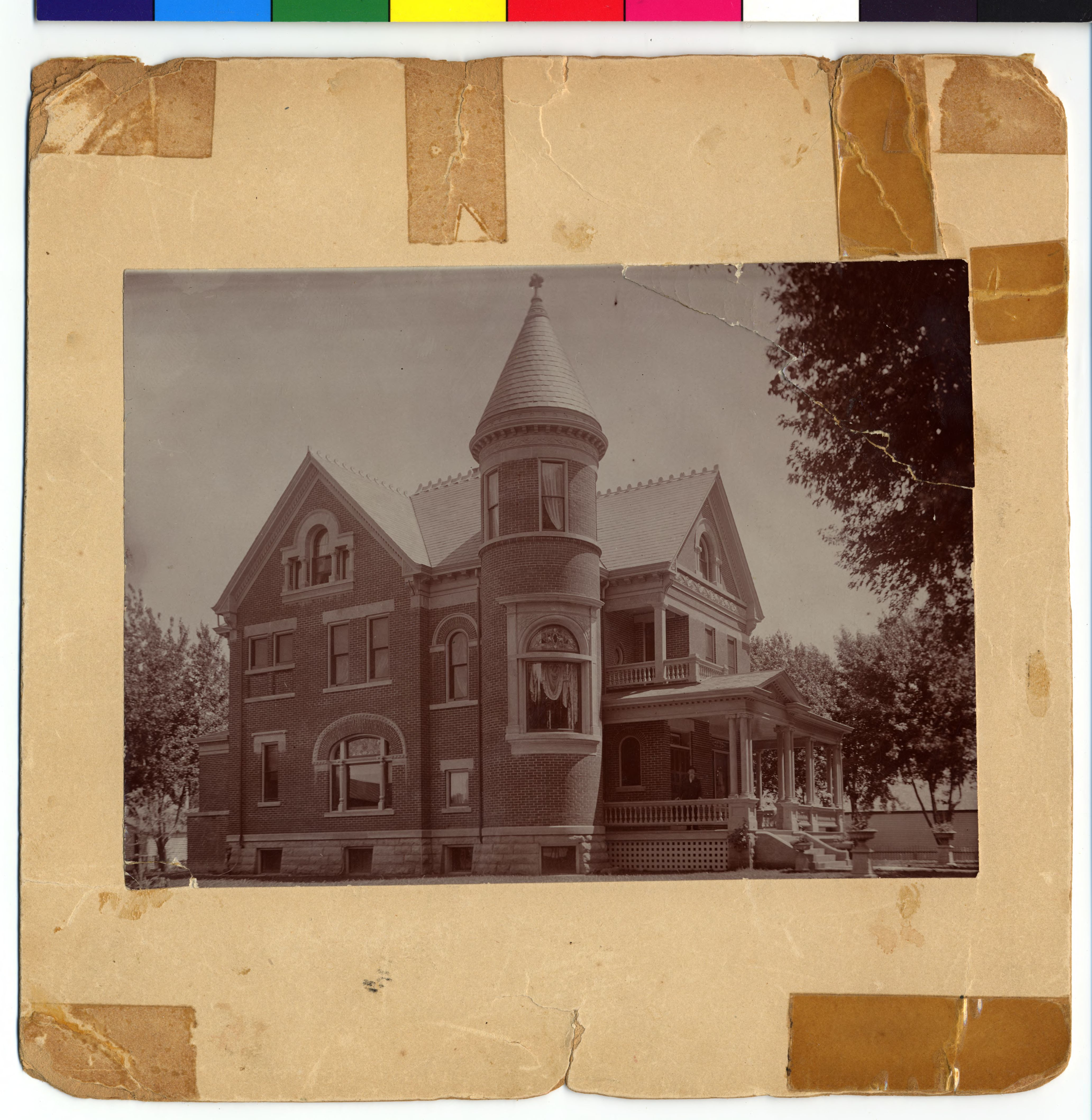
Lucas Troendle home, Mapleton, Minnesota

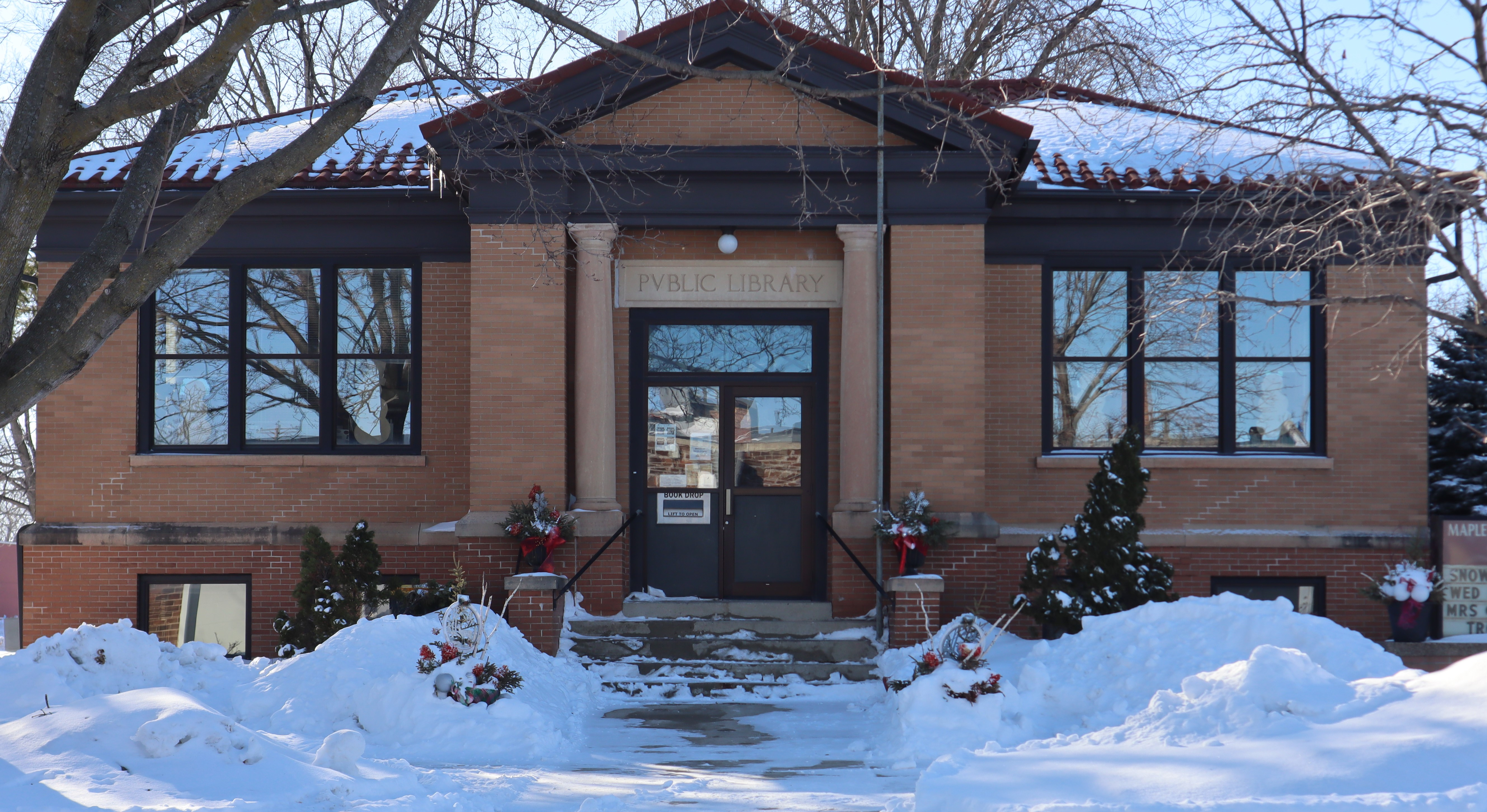
Mapleton Public Library is a Carnegie library.

Historical population
| Census | Pop. | Note | %± |
|---|---|---|---|
| 1880 | 351 | | — |
| 1890 | 607 | | 72.9% |
| 1900 | 1,008 | | 66.1% |
| 1910 | 809 | | −19.7% |
| 1920 | 857 | | 5.9% |
| 1930 | 862 | | 0.6% |
| 1940 | 1,070 | | 24.1% |
| 1950 | 1,083 | | 1.2% |
| 1960 | 1,107 | | 2.2% |
| 1970 | 1,307 | | 18.1% |
| 1980 | 1,516 | | 16.0% |
| 1990 | 1,526 | | 0.7% |
| 2000 | 1,678 | | 10.0% |
| 2010 | 1,756 | | 4.6% |
| 2020 | 1,710 | | −2.6% |
| 2021 (est.) | 1,687 | | −1.3% |
U.S. Decennial Census; 2020 Census

=== 2020 census ===
As of the 2020 census, Mapleton had a population of 1,710. The median age was 38.8 years. 23.7% of residents were under the age of 18 and 20.5% of residents were 65 years of age or older. For every 100 females there were 96.8 males, and for every 100 females age 18 and over there were 92.9 males age 18 and over.

0.0% of residents lived in urban areas, while 100.0% lived in rural areas.

There were 666 households in Mapleton, of which 29.0% had children under the age of 18 living in them. Of all households, 49.4% were married-couple households, 15.6% were households with a male householder and no spouse or partner present, and 26.7% were households with a female householder and no spouse or partner present. About 28.5% of all households were made up of individuals and 13.4% had someone living alone who was 65 years of age or older.

There were 714 housing units, of which 6.7% were vacant. The homeowner vacancy rate was 2.5% and the rental vacancy rate was 7.6%.

Racial composition as of the 2020 census
| Race | Number | Percent |
|---|---|---|
| White | 1,604 | 93.8% |
| Black or African American | 15 | 0.9% |
| American Indian and Alaska Native | 2 | 0.1% |
| Asian | 5 | 0.3% |
| Native Hawaiian and Other Pacific Islander | 0 | 0.0% |
| Some other race | 13 | 0.8% |
| Two or more races | 71 | 4.2% |
| Hispanic or Latino (of any race) | 63 | 3.7% |

=== 2010 census ===
As of the census of 2010, there were 1,756 people, 681 households, and 475 families living in the city. The population density was 1,202.7 inhabitants per square mile (464.4/km^{2}). There were 715 housing units at an average density of 489.7 per square mile (189.1/km^{2}). The racial makeup of the city was 97.4% White, 0.8% African American, 0.1% Native American, 0.5% Asian, 0.1% Pacific Islander, and 1.1% from two or more races. Hispanic or Latino of any race were 1.9% of the population.

There were 681 households, of which 37.0% had children under the age of 18 living with them, 52.0% were married couples living together, 11.6% had a female householder with no husband present, 6.2% had a male householder with no wife present, and 30.2% were non-families. 26.9% of all households were made up of individuals, and 14% had someone living alone who was 65 years of age or older. The average household size was 2.48 and the average family size was 2.99.

The median age in the city was 36.9 years. 27.4% of residents were under the age of 18; 6.4% were between the ages of 18 and 24; 25.8% were from 25 to 44; 23% were from 45 to 64; and 17.5% were 65 years of age or older. The gender makeup of the city was 48.4% male and 51.6% female.

=== 2000 census ===
As of the census of 2000, there were 1,678 people, 637 households, and 443 families living in the city. The population density was 1,117.8 inhabitants per square mile (431.6/km^{2}). There were 656 housing units at an average density of 437.0 per square mile (168.7/km^{2}). The racial makeup of the city was 97.79% White, 0.48% Native American, 0.30% Asian, 0.06% Pacific Islander, 0.42% from other races, and 0.95% from two or more races. Hispanic or Latino of any race were 3.46% of the population.

There were 637 households, out of which 36.4% had children under the age of 18 living with them, 57.3% were married couples living together, 9.4% had a female householder with no husband present, and 30.3% were non-families. 26.1% of all households were made up of individuals, and 14.0% had someone living alone who was 65 years of age or older. The average household size was 2.49 and the average family size was 3.01.

In the city, the population was spread out, with 26.5% under the age of 18, 8.4% from 18 to 24, 26.3% from 25 to 44, 18.4% from 45 to 64, and 20.3% who were 65 years of age or older. The median age was 38 years. For every 100 females, there were 94.0 males. For every 100 females age 18 and over, there were 85.1 males.

The median income for a household in the city was $38,790, and the median income for a family was $48,250. Males had a median income of $29,718 versus $20,656 for females. The per capita income for the city was $18,375. About 2.9% of families and 3.7% of the population were below the poverty line, including 2.4% of those under age 18 and 7.9% of those age 65 or over.

== Education ==
Maple River Senior High School is in the city.

== Safety ==
Mapleton has three full-time police officers and four part-time officers providing 24-hour protection to the city. It has an all-volunteer fire department providing 24-hour protection for the city and the six surrounding townships.
