= National Register of Historic Places listings in Big Stone County, Minnesota =

Location of Big Stone County in Minnesota

This is a list of the National Register of Historic Places listings in Big Stone County, Minnesota. It is intended to be a complete list of the properties and districts on the National Register of Historic Places in Big Stone County, Minnesota, United States. Latitude and longitude coordinates are provided for many National Register properties and districts; these locations may be seen together in an online map.

There are 7 properties and districts listed on the National Register in the county. A supplementary list includes three sites that were formerly listed on the National Register.

This National Park Service list is complete through NPS recent listings posted August 1, 2025.

== Current listings ==
	Name on the Register	Image	Date listed	Location	City or town	Description
1	Big Stone County Courthouse	Big Stone County Courthouse	August 15, 1985 (#85001764)	20 2nd St., SE. 45°18′17″N 96°26′40″W	Ortonville	Monumental Victorian courthouse designed by Fremont D. Orff and completed in 1902; Big Stone County's long-serving seat of government and largest Victorian building.
2	Chicago, Milwaukee, St. Paul and Pacific Depot	Chicago, Milwaukee, St. Paul and Pacific Depot	July 31, 1986 (#86002118)	Main and Center Sts. 45°27′35″N 96°26′14″W	Clinton	Well-preserved example of a small combination depot, built c. 1885. Also noted as Clinton's oldest building and a symbol of the impact of railroads on the town. Now houses a city history museum.
3	Graceville Historical Marker	Graceville Historical Marker	December 15, 2004 (#04001358)	Minnesota Highway 15; 45°34′05″N 96°27′00″W	Graceville	Well-preserved example of an early Minnesota highway wayside, built 1940–41 by the Works Progress Administration. Also noted for its NPS Rustic landscape architecture by Arthur R. Nichols.
4	Odessa Jail	Odessa Jail	July 24, 1986 (#86001916)	Main and 2nd Sts. 45°15′37″N 96°19′44″W	Odessa	Odessa's oldest public building, built in 1913; a rare surviving example of the freestanding brick jailhouses once common in small Minnesota towns.
5	Ortonville Commercial Historic District	Ortonville Commercial Historic District	August 15, 1985 (#85001765)	2nd St., Madison and Monroe Aves., between Jefferson and Jackson Aves. 45°18′22″N 96°26′47″W	Ortonville	Long-serving commercial district noted for its uniform Victorian buildings, representative of the region's small towns but unique for their purple granite trim. Contains 19 contributing properties built 1879–1922.
6	Ortonville Free Library	Ortonville Free Library	August 15, 1985 (#85001767)	412 2nd St., NW. 45°18′31″N 96°26′54″W	Ortonville	One of west-central Minnesota's few examples of a Carnegie library and of Mission Revival architecture, built in 1915. Also significant as a work of St. Paul architect Franklin Ellerbe and the Carlson-Hasslen Construction Company.
7	St. Pauli Norwegian Evangelical Lutheran Church	St. Pauli Norwegian Evangelical Lutheran Church	August 26, 2010 (#10000581)	33022 U.S. Route 75; 45°25′35″N 96°25′52″W	Clinton	1896 church—expanded in 1911—and adjoining cemetery, anchor of a rural Norwegian immigrant community.

== Former listing ==
	Name on the Register	Image	Date listed	Date removed	Location	City or town	Description
1	Columbian Hotel	Columbian Hotel	August 15, 1985 (#85001766)	November 1, 2018	305 2nd St. NW. 45°18′26″N 96°26′52″W	Ortonville	Exemplary Victorian hotel built in 1892, a landmark and key amenity in downtown Ortonville. Destroyed by fire October 26, 2012.
2	District No. 13 School	District No. 13 School	August 15, 1985 (#85001772)	January 29, 2025	County Road 25 (original address); Current coordinates are 45°17′48″N 96°25′54″W	Correll	Unique octagonal schoolhouse built in 1898. Also significant as one of the county's first schools and the first building by a founder of the regionally notable Carlson-Hasslen Construction Company. Moved to the Big Stone County Historical Museum.
3	Shannon Hotel		August 15, 1985 (#85001773)	August 2, 2000	Studdart Ave. and 2nd St.	Graceville	1902 brick Queen Anne hotel. Demolished in 1999.

== See also ==
- List of National Historic Landmarks in Minnesota
- National Register of Historic Places listings in Minnesota
