= Don Gerhardt =

American gridiron football player (born 1944)

Profile
- Position: Defensive end

Personal information
- Born: March 31, 1944 (age 82); Ortonville, Minnesota
- Listed height: 6 ft 3 in (1.91 m)
- Listed weight: 200 lb (91 kg)

Career history
- 1966–1968: Saskatchewan Roughriders

Awards and highlights
- Grey Cup champion (1966)

Donald Edward Gerhardt (born March 31, 1944) was an American professional football player who played for the Saskatchewan Roughriders, winning the Grey Cup with them in 1966. He played college football at Concordia College in Moorhead, Minnesota. After his retirement from football he was CEO of a health care trade association, Medical Alley/MNBIO and LifeScience Alley, living in Golden Valley, Minnesota.
