= Samuel Barr =

Samuel Barr may refer to:

- Samuel Fleming Barr (1829–1919), member of the U.S. House of Representatives from Pennsylvania
- Samuel Russell Barr (1914–2001), member of the Minnesota House of Representatives
- Sammy Barr (1931–2012), British shipyard worker and trade unionist
