= St. Pauli Norwegian Evangelical Lutheran Church =

Historic church in Minnesota, United States

- U.S. National Register of Historic Places
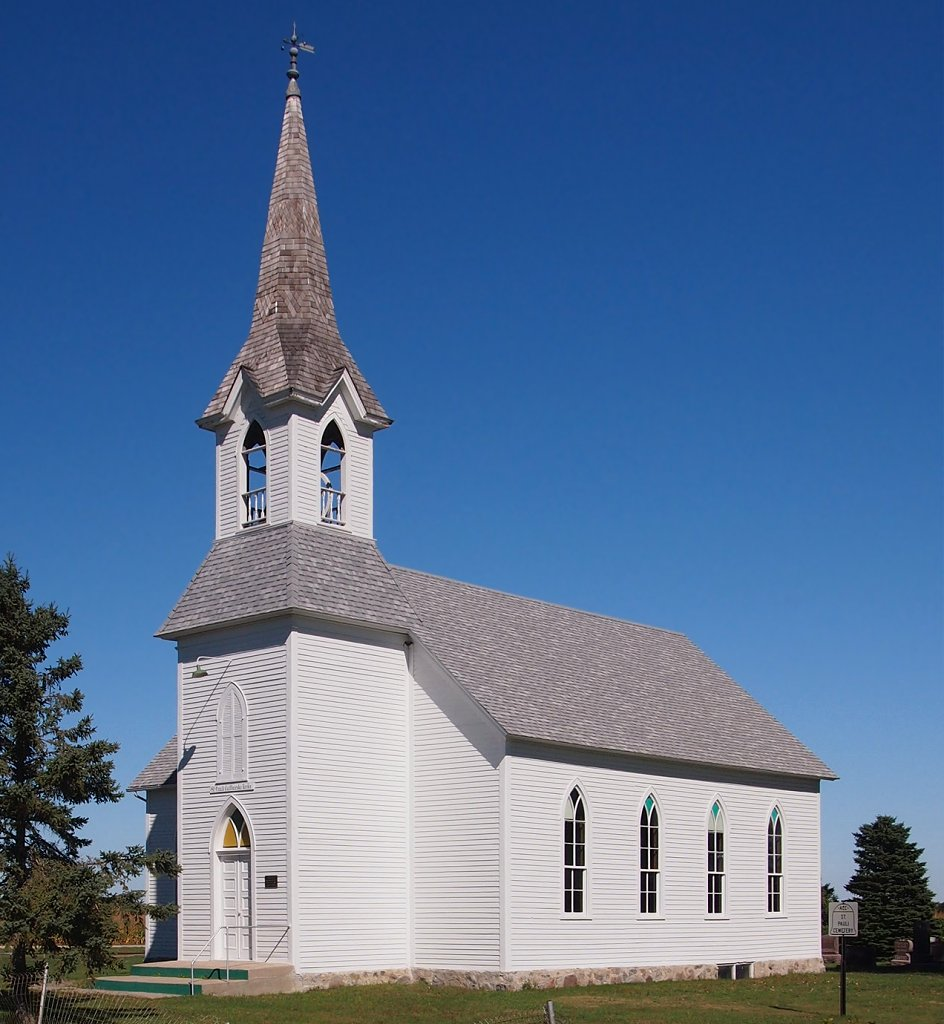
- As seen in October of 2013

- Location within Minnesota Location within the United States
- Location: Big Stone County Rd 60, Big Stone County Rd 8, and U.S. Route 75, Clinton, Minnesota
- Coordinates: 45°25′36″N 96°25′51″W
- Area: Less than one acre
- Built: 1896
- Architectural style: Gothic Revival
- NRHP reference No.: 10000581
- Added to NRHP: August 26, 2010

The St. Pauli Norwegian Evangelical Lutheran Church is a Gothic Revival or Late Victorian styled evangelical Lutheran church in Clinton, Big Stone County, Minnesota. It is on the United States National Register of Historic Places.

== Geography ==
The St. Pauli Norwegian Evangelical Lutheran Church is located near Lysing Lake, Clinton. It is situated on the intersection of U.S. Route 75, Big Stone County Road 60 and Big Stone County Road 8. It is 2.3 miles away from the center of Clinton: a 3-mile drive on average. The St. Pauli Norwegian Evangelical Lutheran Church is surrounded by native trees, brush, and corn fields.

== History ==
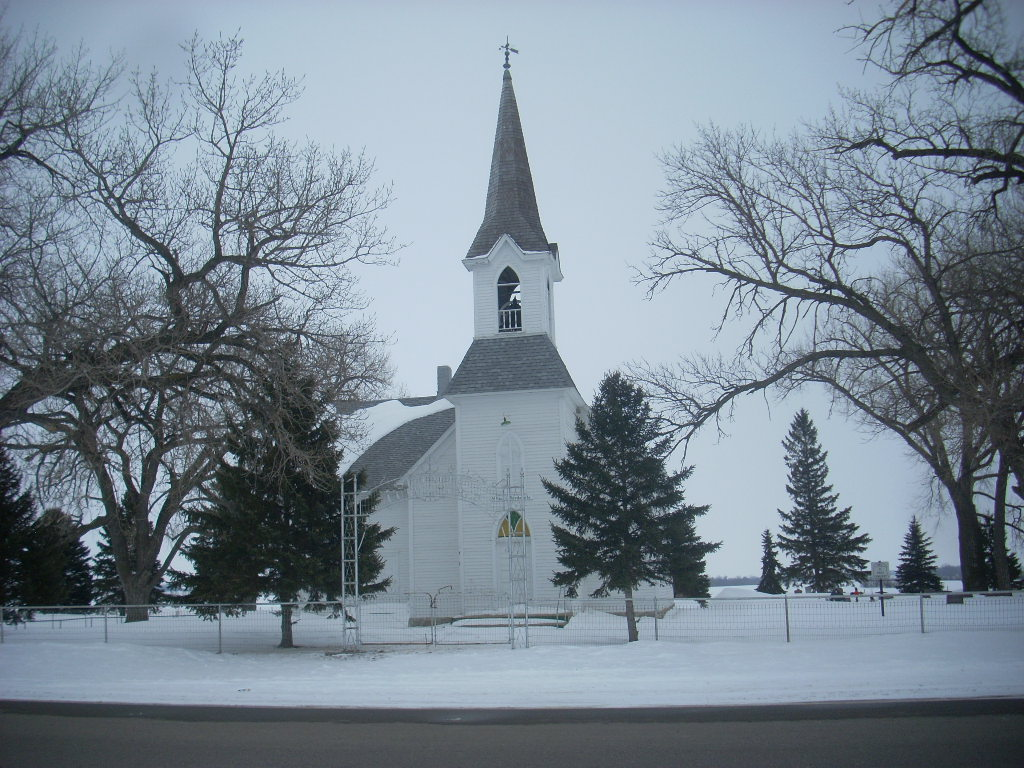
As seen in March 2011 with snow on the ground

The St. Pauli Norwegian Evangelical Lutheran Church was founded an built in 1896 on $3,300 of land by Sevrin and Lisbet Huselid; years after a conflict with the Trinity Lutheran Church. The conflict started when the two churches in the Almond Township of Big Stone County split in two over religious beliefs, with the St. Pauli Norwegian Lutheran Church believing in a Norwegian Synod ideal, while the Trinity Lutheran Church believing in a United Lutheran Church ideal. Both churches built their main buildings in 1896, with St. Pauli Norwegian Evangelical Lutheran Church receiving an extension in 1911 for a parochial school. The churches then started to cooperate with each other from 1920 to 1944, with pastors preaching at both locations. In May 1957, the St. Pauli Norwegian Evangelical Lutheran Church and the Trinity Lutheran Church reunited after a congregational voting session.

It was listed on the United States National Register of Historic Places on August 26, 2010.

== See also ==
- National Register of Historic Places listings in Big Stone County, Minnesota
- National Register of Historic Places listings in Minnesota
