= Big Stone County Museum =

Museum in Ortonville, Minnesota, US

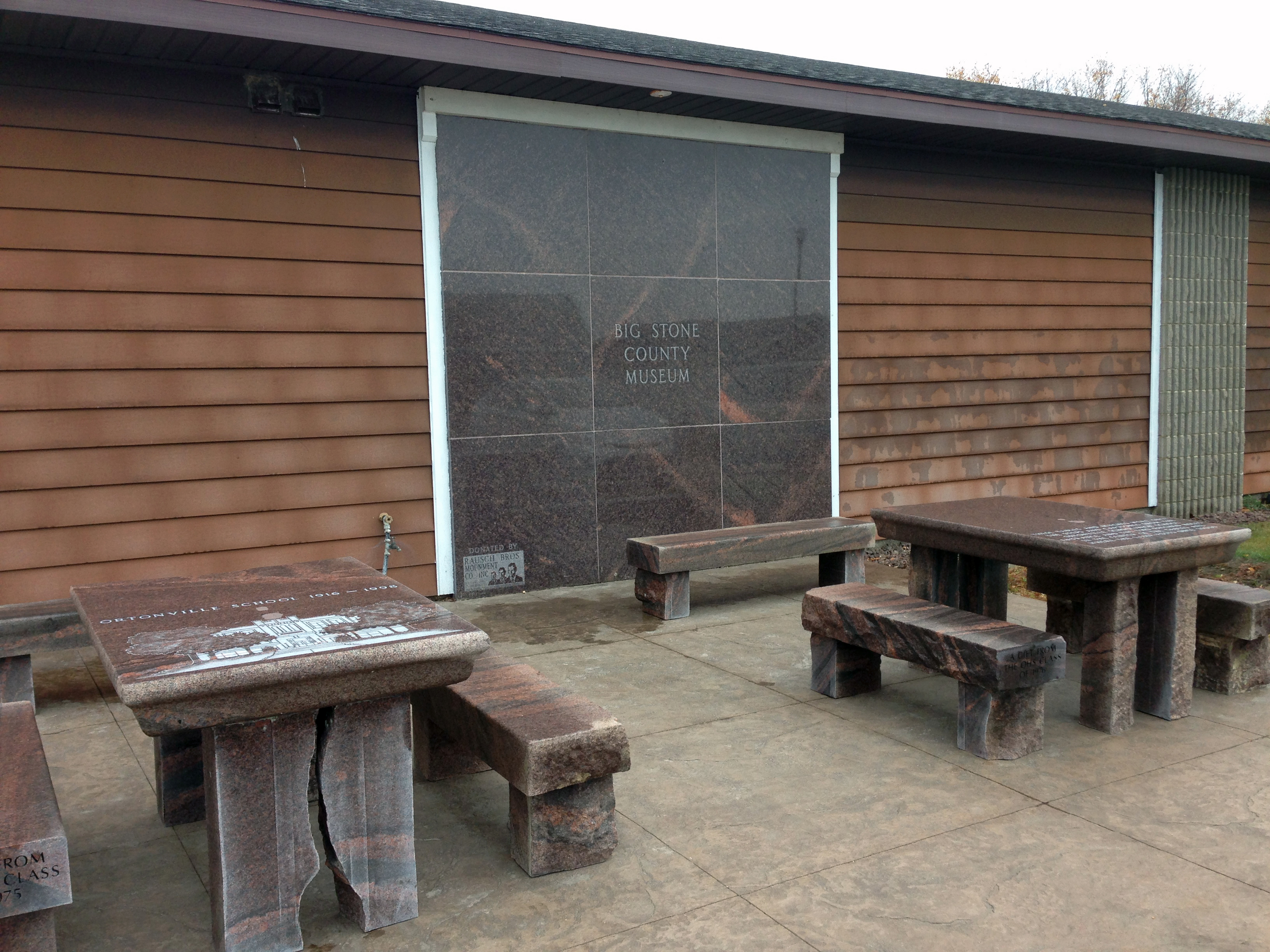
- Big stone benches at museum
- Location: 985 US Highway 12, Ortonville, Minnesota, United States
- Coordinates: 45°17′50″N 96°25′53″W
- Type: Local history

The Big Stone County Museum is located in Ortonville, Minnesota, United States. The museum preserves and presents the history, culture, and natural heritage of Big Stone County and the surrounding region. The museum is located near other historic sites along the shore of Big Stone Lake.

== History and mission ==
The Big Stone County Museum collects and preserves historical information, buildings, monuments, sites, and trails from Big Stone County. The Big Stone County Historical Society governs the museum. The society is responsible for the management, preservation, and presentation of the museum's collections and programs. The society also oversees the collection of genealogy records, historical photographs, the curation of exhibits, and the coordination of public access. The museum operates as a project of the society, which is a nonprofit organization.

== Exhibits ==
The museum features a range of exhibits, including:

- Artifacts and fossils from the region
- Local genealogy records and historical photographs
- A wildlife museum with a taxidermy collection
- A 1900s boat, church, log cabins, and farm machinery
- Outdoor displays with models of a farmhouse and two log cabins
- A walking trail around a lake, which includes historic displays
- A lookout tower with a view of the Minnesota River Valley

The museum also holds images from several local photographic collections, including the Reed Studio Collection, the A.L. Lee Collection, the Elite Art Studio Collection, the Utley Collection, and the general collection with images from traveling photographer C. I. Angell.

== Facilities and features ==
The walking trail and outdoor exhibits allow visitors to explore the grounds and view historic structures and artifacts. The site of the museum is associated with local legends, including the story of Paul Bunyan's anchor.

=== 1898 District 13 School ===
The 1898 District 13 School is a unique octagonal schoolhouse that was originally located on County Road 25 near Correll, Minnesota. Built in 1898, it is significant as one of the county's earliest schools and as the first building constructed by a founder of the Carlson-Hasslen Construction Company. The District 13 School allows visitors to explore the educational environment of rural Minnesota at the turn of the twentieth century and serves as a physical reminder of the county's commitment to public education.

The building functioned as a school until 1955, after which the rural schools in the area merged with the Appleton public schools, and it was repurposed as the Artichoke Town Hall. In 2007 the structure was relocated to the grounds of the Big Stone County Historical Museum for permanent preservation. However, this move led to its removal from the National Register of Historic Places on January 29, 2025.

=== Charles Hanson Wild Life Display building ===
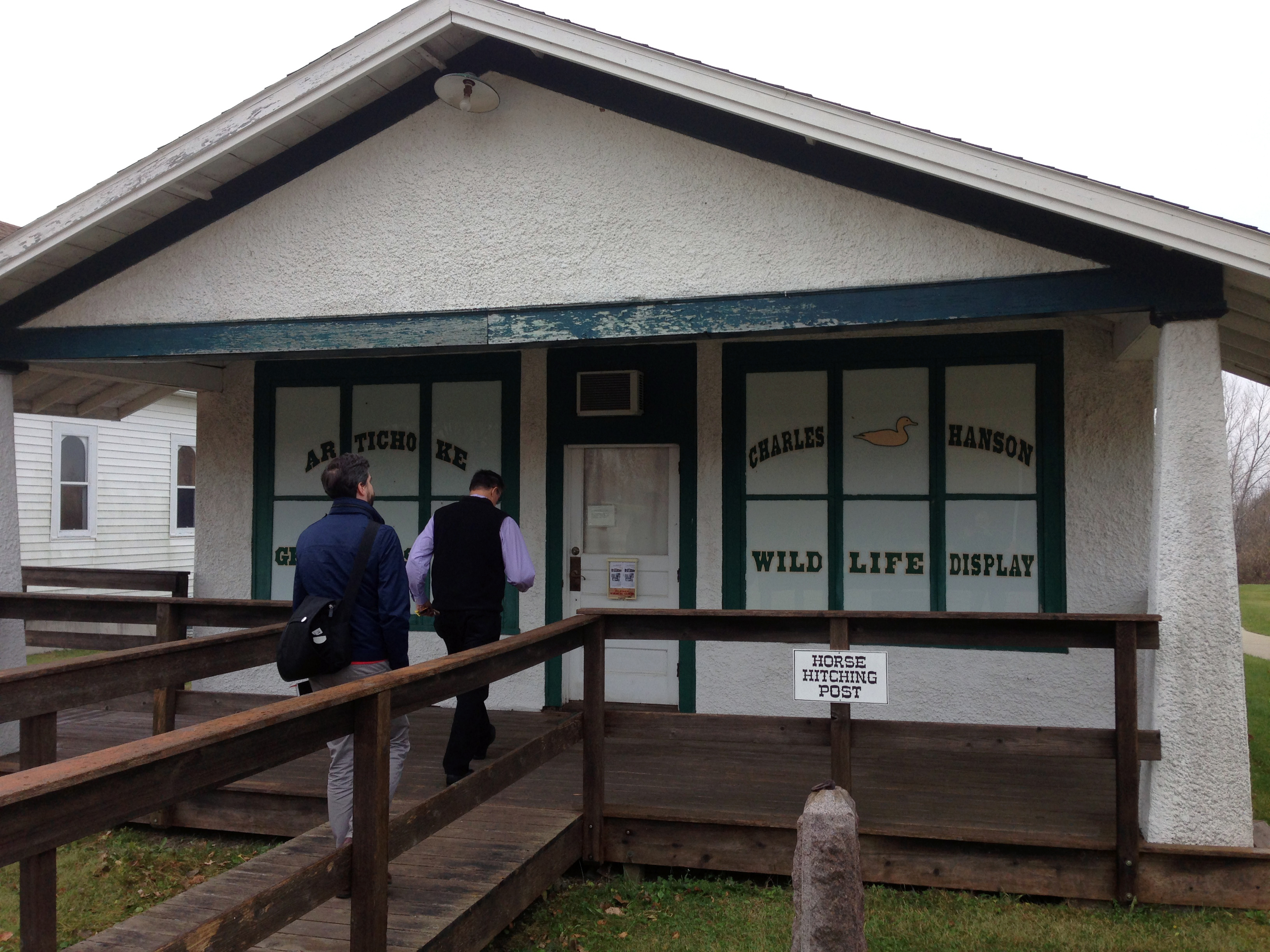
Charles Hanson Wild Life Display building

The building is a key feature of the museum. This building houses the Charles Hanson North American Wildlife Collection, which consists of a large number of taxidermy specimens representing waterfowl and other birds from North America.

The collection is displayed inside the former Artichoke Lake Trading Post, a one-room building constructed in 1927 and originally owned by Charles Hanson's uncle. Charles Hanson, a local farmer, assembled the wildlife collection over many years. When his collection grew to more than 500 species, he donated it to the Big Stone County Historical Society. The society then moved both the collection and the historic building to the museum grounds in Ortonville.

=== Engebrecht Peterson Log Cabin ===
The Engebrecht Peterson Log Cabin is an historic structure that was relocated to the Big Stone County Museum grounds.

== Gallery ==
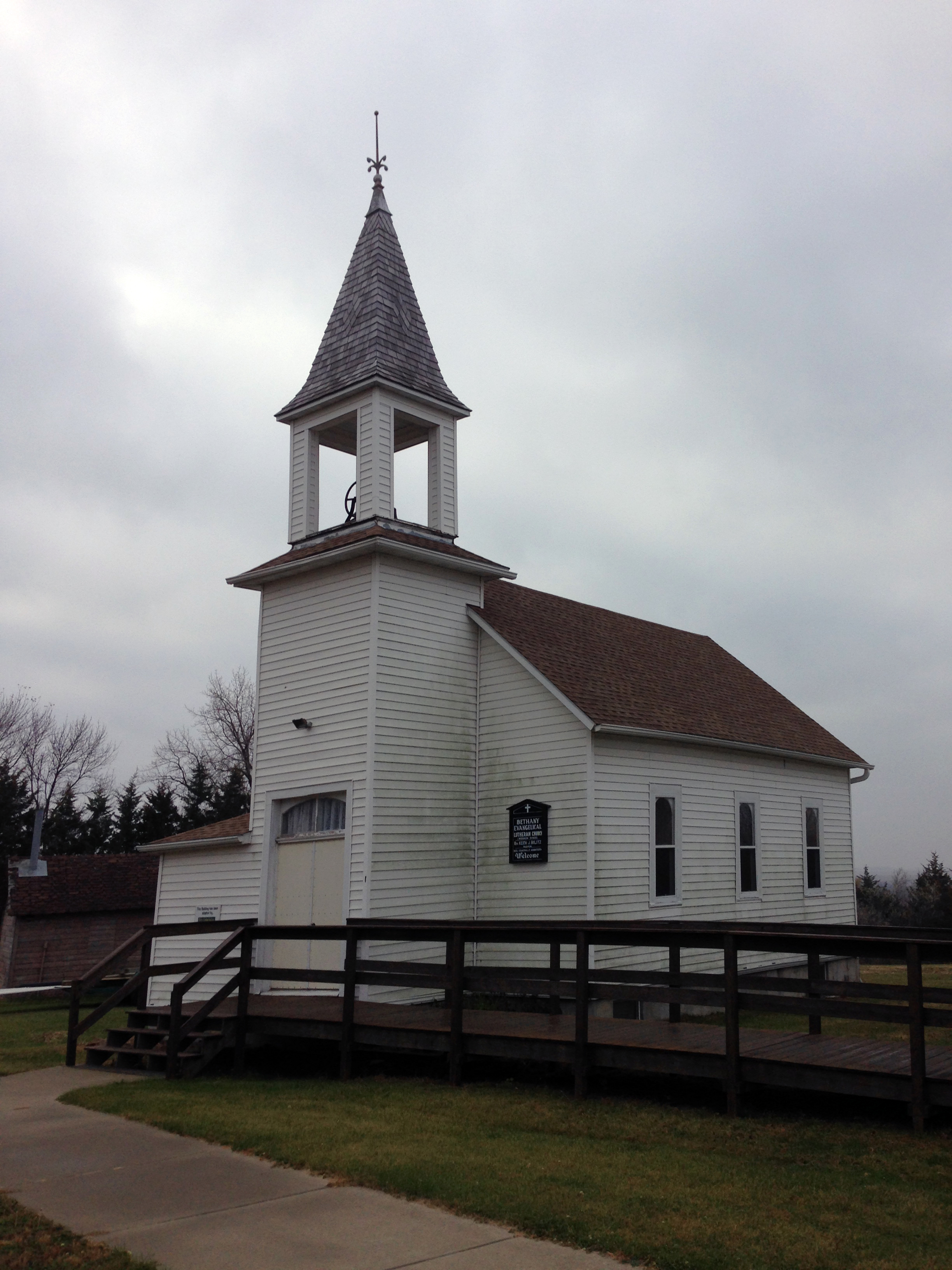
Bethany Evangelical Lutheran Church museum

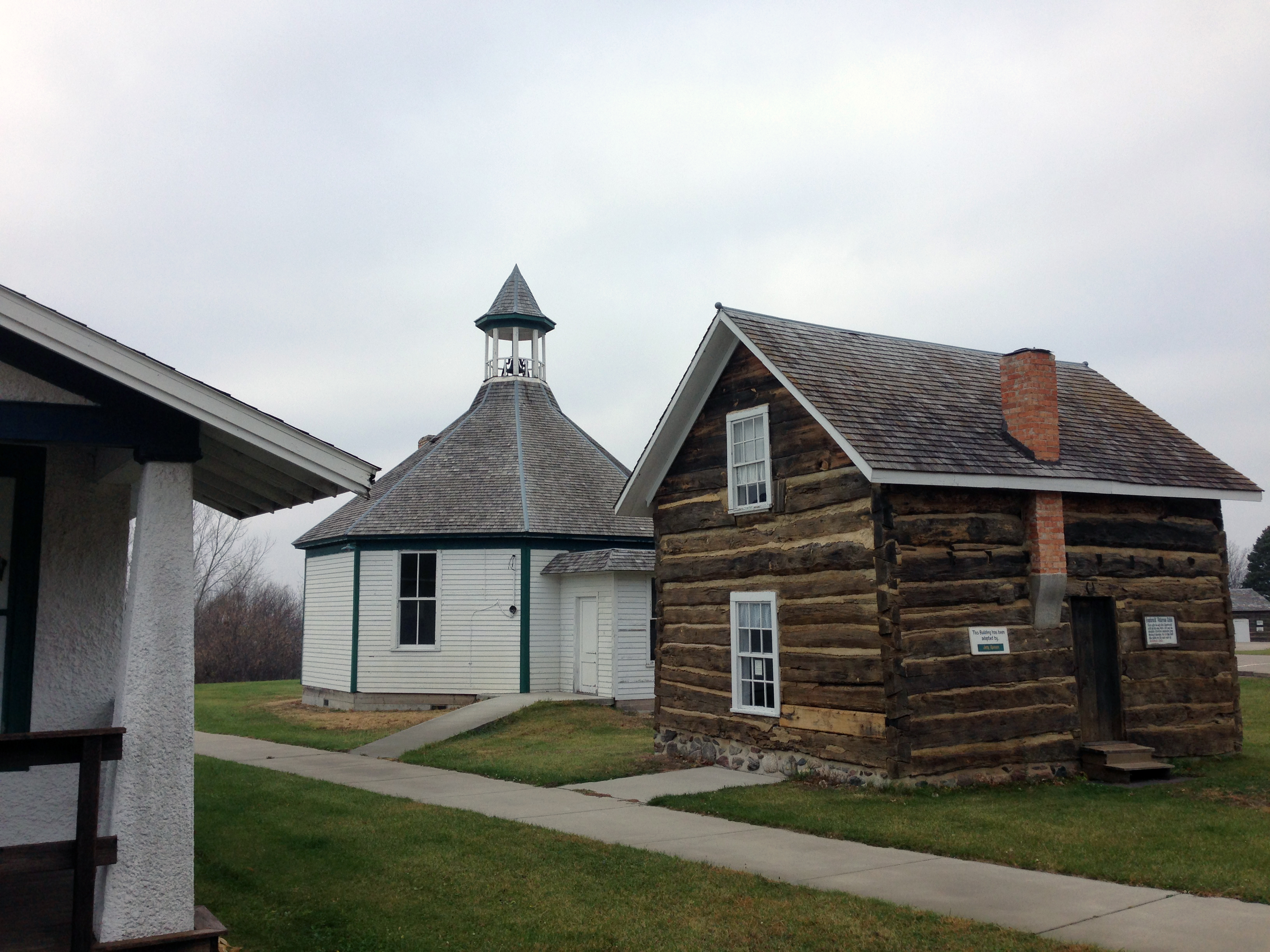
Engebrecht Peterson log cabin and 1898 District 13 School

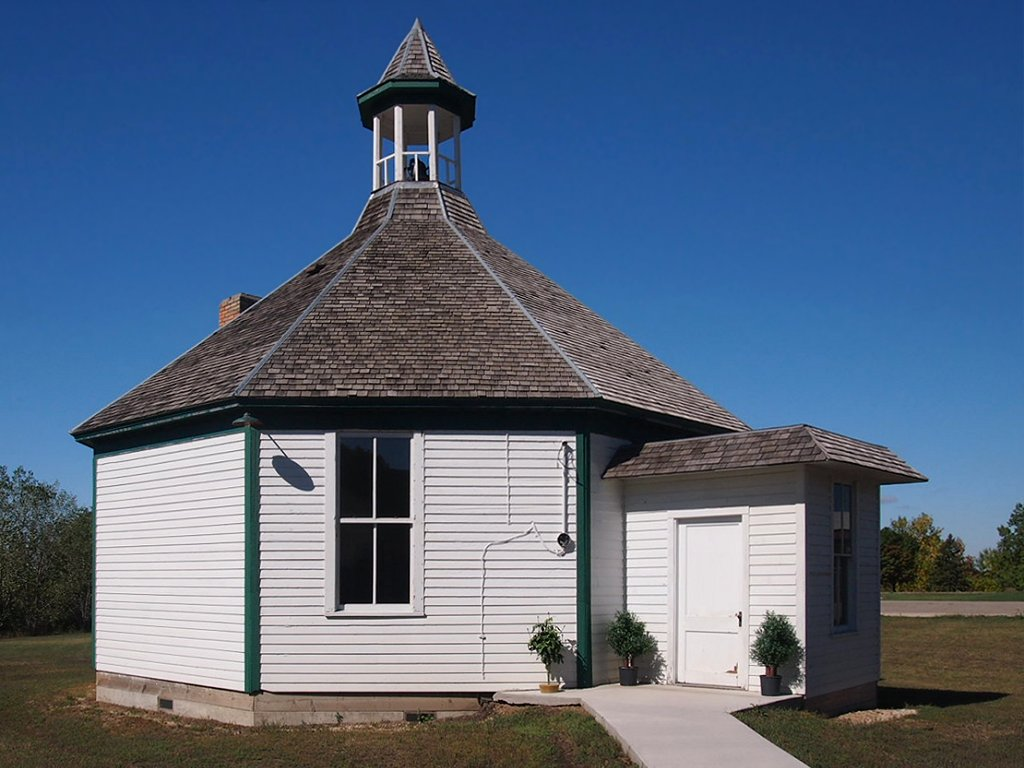
District No. 13 School

== See also ==
- List of museums in Minnesota
