= Clinton station (Minnesota) =

Railway station in Minnesota, United States

Clinton
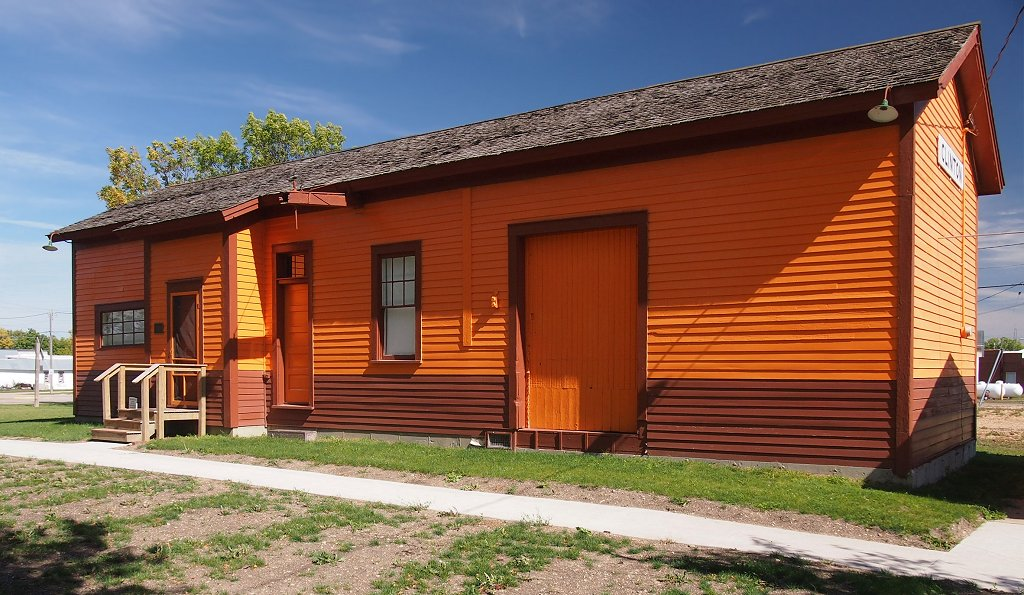
- Clinton's Milwaukee Road depot from the southwest

General information
- Location: Main Street, Clinton, Minnesota 56225
- System: Former Milwaukee Road passenger rail station

History
- Opened: July 2, 1884

Services
Preceding station	Milwaukee Road	Following station
Graceville toward Fargo	Fargo – Ortonville	Ortonville Terminus
- Chicago, Milwaukee, St. Paul and Pacific Depot
- U.S. National Register of Historic Places
- Location within Minnesota Location within the United States
- Location: Clinton, Minnesota
- Coordinates: 45°27′34.88″N 96°26′13.51″W
- Built: 1885
- Architect: Chicago, Milwaukee, & St. Paul R.R.
- NRHP reference No.: 86002118
- Added to NRHP: July 31, 1986
Location

The Chicago, Milwaukee, St. Paul and Pacific Depot in Clinton, Minnesota, United States, is a historic railway station. It is now known as the Clinton Depot, and serves as a local history museum for the Clinton area. It was added to the National Register of Historic Places in 1985. The interior has hardwood floors and decorative wainscoting in the waiting room, an office in the middle and a freight room at the south end. Exhibits include military memorabilia, farm and agriculture displays, train memorabilia, and photos, posters, newspapers and historic items about Clinton.

== Line information ==
The Fargo and Southern railroad company built a loading platform in 1883 two miles south of Clinton. It was called Rupert.

Two years later they moved their station to Clinton and it was called Batavia as late as 1899. The Fargo and Company line built from Ortonville to the South Dakota line near Wheaton, going through Clinton in 1884 and sold to the Chicago, Milwaukee, St. Paul and Pacific Railroad company in 1885.

The first through train on the line ran July 2, 1884.

From 1885 through the late 1920s four trains stopped at the Clinton depot each day including morning freight and passenger trains northbound for Fargo, an afternoon southbound train, and an evening southbound passenger train.

== Telegraphs ==
Posted at the depot was a sign which read "Western Union Telegraph Office." Railroads not only carried the mail and newspapers, they also meant another means of communication. Depot agents were necessarily telegraphers. In addition to handling railroad communications, they also relayed messages to the general public.

Telegraphy was the fastest means of news, business, and personal transmission at that time. Telegrams were used extensively until the late 1940s. J.P. Pratt became the depot agent in 1891. He had driven a streetcar in St. Paul and then learned telegraphy before he came to Clinton. While Mr. Pratt was depot agent, Frank Petrick became interested in the work and learned the Morse code and operation of the telegraph from him. Mr. Petrick started working as depot agent in 1901 and continued, except during the year 1908, until he retired in 1945.

Business, especially freight, increased to such an extent that Frank's wife, Alice Condit Petrick, was hired as depot assistant from 1909 to 1934. In 1900 a sleeping car was added to the passenger train. The 1904 Platt book shows the railroad depot to be located north of Main Street, and directly west of the crown elevator.

== Line discontinued ==
There was daily service until May 1930, when Sunday passenger trains were discontinued. After 1932, a freight train with one passenger coach provided mixed service until 1956.

The Campbell Post American Legion purchased one of the discarded railroad coaches in 1935. They installed it on the Legion lot opposite the Advocate office and used it as a legion hall. A.L. Makinster succeeded Frank Petrick as depot agent in 1945 until 1969. On December 16, 1968, the Milwaukee Road discontinued operation of passenger trains numbers 15 and 16 (the unnamed remnant of the Olympian Hiawatha), operating between Chicago and Tacoma, Washington. The Milwaukee depot in Clinton closed December 12, 1969.

The line was discontinued March 1, 1980, and the track torn up a year later. By 1980 the Chicago, Milwaukee, and St. Paul Railroad was bankrupt and the survival of the line depended on heavy subsidization.
