= Little Falls Carnegie Library =

- U.S. National Register of Historic Places
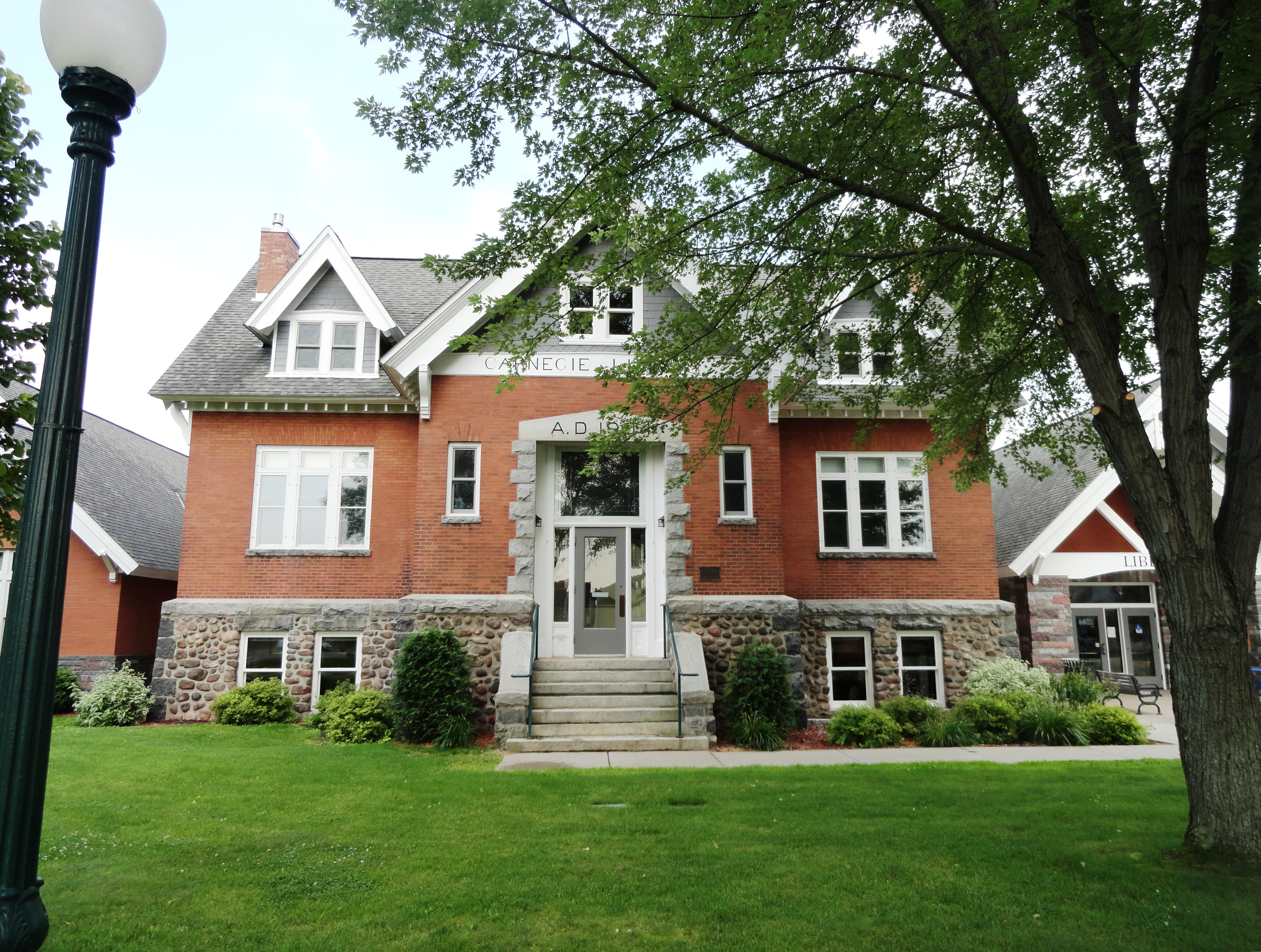
- The library's exterior

- Location within Minnesota Location within the United States
- Interactive map of Little Falls Carnegie Library
- Location: 108 3rd St. NE, Little Falls, Minnesota
- Coordinates: 45.976364°N 94.358682°W
- Area: less than one acre
- Built: 1905
- Architect: Fremont D. Orff
- Architectural style: American Craftsman
- Website: griver.org/locations/little-falls
- NRHP reference No.: 80002091
- Added to NRHP: November 3, 1980

The Little Falls Carnegie Library is a historic Carnegie library in Little Falls, Minnesota. It was added to the National Register of Historic Places on November 3, 1980, for its architectural significance.

The Little falls library differentiates itself from other Carnegie libraries as it doesn't follow the traditional Neoclassical style, instead following the American Craftsman style under architect Fremont D. Orff. The library was granted on March 14, 1902, and opened on February 7, 1905. It is still open and serves as a library today, as part of the Great River Regional Library. Of the 66 Carnegie libraries built in Minnesota, it is one of the 50 still standing and one of the 23 to still function as a library.

== Description ==
The library is built in the American Craftsman style, constructed of brick and stone and measuring two stories. The basement is constructed with locally sourced fieldstone arranged in a random pattern, which can be seen surrounding the exterior of the building. Buff-colored bricks are used for the main level, which is separated from the basement level with a gray granite water table. The building is covered by a dormered gable roof. The exterior has a lack of ornamentation, although some can be found on the bargeboard on the gables and dormers and the granite quoins that surround the front entrance. The building was built on a cruciform plan, which is evident in the interior arrangement within the library. The main floor features a centrally located circulation area with reading rooms to the left and right and bookshelves to the rear. Originally, the lower floor served as an auditorium but has since been converted to a children's area. The attic is a large, finished area used for storage.

== History ==
Little Falls' first library occupied two rooms in the Butler Block, a part of the Little Falls Commercial Historic District. This library was opened in August 1892 and accumulated around 800 books. As more and more books fell into the library's possession, the city of Little Falls turned to Andrew Carnegie, a figure who was well known for his funding of community libraries. The city debated where the library should be built, as the town needed to own the land in order to receive funding from Carnegie. The chosen site was strongly supported by Charles Lindbergh Sr. because he believed it was important for the town's library to have a large lawn and trees for shade. The city bought the property and received a $10,000 grant from Carnegie in 1902. Lindbergh also contributed funds for the library, along with members of the Weyerhauser and Musser families, who accumulated their fortune from their Pine Tree Lumber Company. Construction began in 1904 and the library first opened on February 7, 1905. In its inaugural year, the library recorded 1,415 registered borrowers and housed 2,015 books. For comparison, in 2007, the library had 8,335 registered borrowers and housed 36,949 items. The library was listed on the NRHP in 1980, became a part of the Great River Regional Library System in 1989, finished construction to an addition on the building in 1999 and became equipped with wireless internet in 2008.
