= Perham Village Hall and Fire Station =

- U.S. National Register of Historic Places
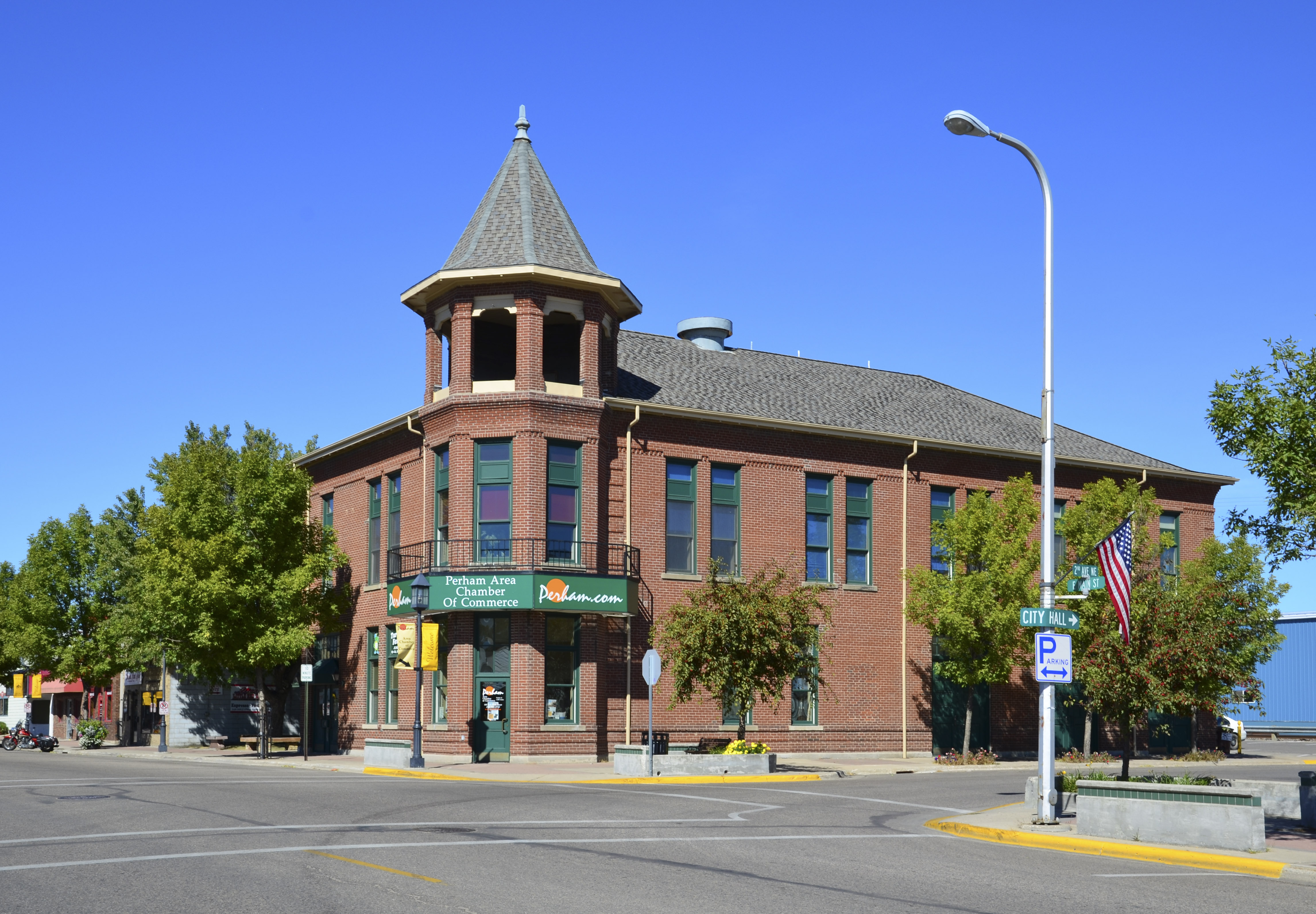

- Location within Minnesota Location within the United States
- Location: 153 E. Main; Perham, Minnesota
- Coordinates: 46°35′38″N 95°34′18″W
- Area: less than one acre
- Built: 1906
- Built by: Alex Nelson
- Architect: Fremont D. Orff
- NRHP reference No.: 86002122
- Added to NRHP: July 31, 1986

Perham Village Hall and Fire Station, also known as the Perham Area Chamber of Commerce, is a historic building located in Perham, Minnesota, United States. Completed in 1906, the two-story brick structure replaced the old village hall that was in need of repair. A bond issue was passed by voters to construct a new building designed by Minneapolis architect Fremont D. Orff. Local contactor Alex Nelson was responsible for construction on the site of the old hall. The building features a rectangular plan, hip roof, and a corner bay with an open tower that rises above the roofline. It was designed as a multi-purpose facility. Council chambers, the fire station and jail were housed on the main floor, and a large hall used for various community functions was located on the second floor. City offices were moved to a different building in 1962, and the fire department moved to their own facility in 1977. The city retained ownership of the building and it continues to serve other city departments. The building was listed on the National Register of Historic Places in 1986.
