= Renville County Courthouse and Jail =

- U.S. National Register of Historic Places
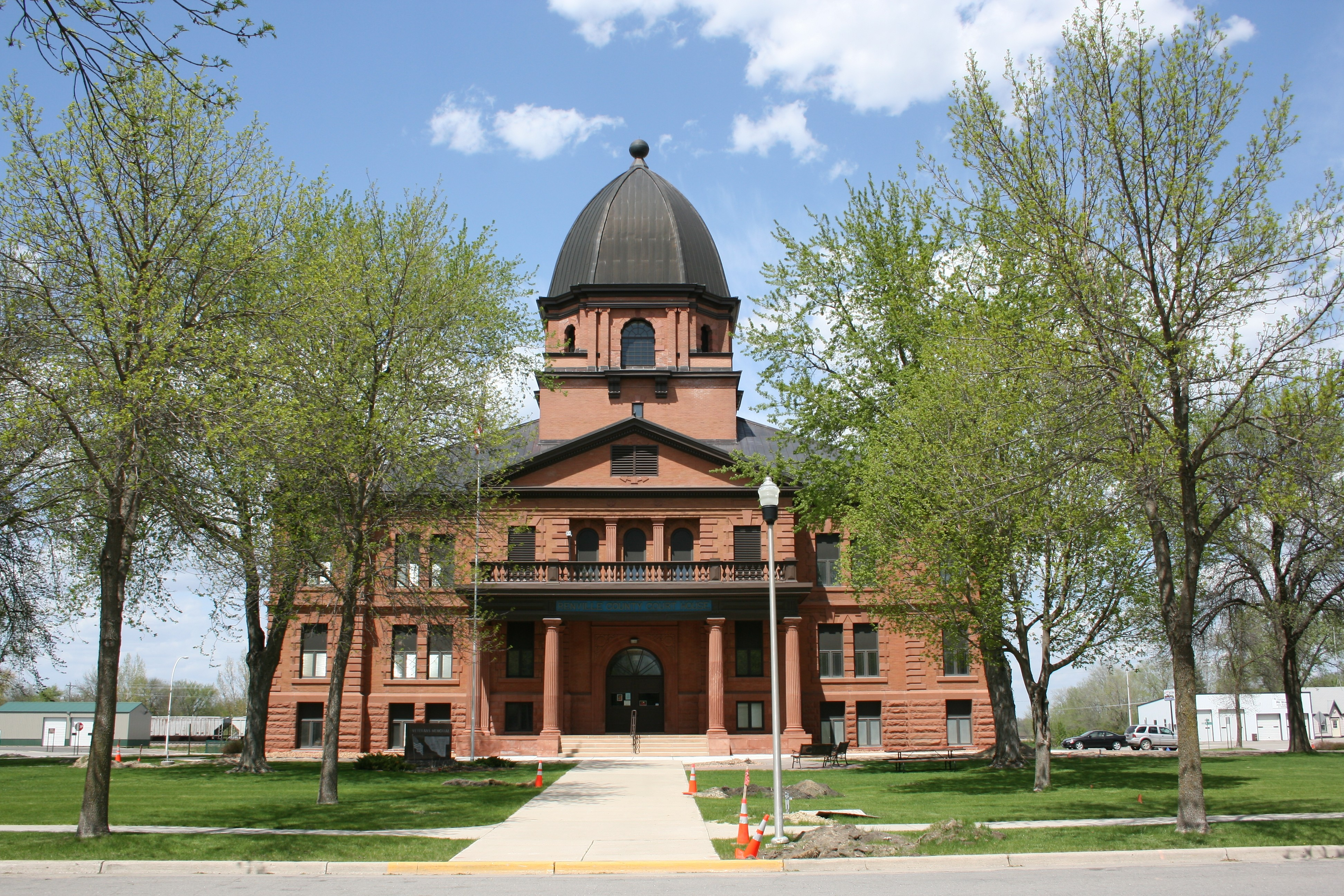
- Renville County Courthouse from the south

- Location within Minnesota Location within the United States
- Interactive map showing the location of Renville County Courthouse and Jail
- Location: Olivia, Minnesota
- Coordinates: 44°46′34″N 94°59′0″W
- Area: 2.54 acres (1.03 ha)
- Built: 1902
- Architect: Orff, Fremont D. (courthouse architect); Kinney, Frank W. (jail architect); Olsen, O. H. (builder)
- Architectural style: Late Victorian
- NRHP reference No.: 86001281
- Added to NRHP: June 13, 1986

The Renville County Courthouse and Jail is a historic building located at 500 East DePue Avenue in Olivia, Minnesota, United States; the seat of Renville County. It was constructed in 1902.

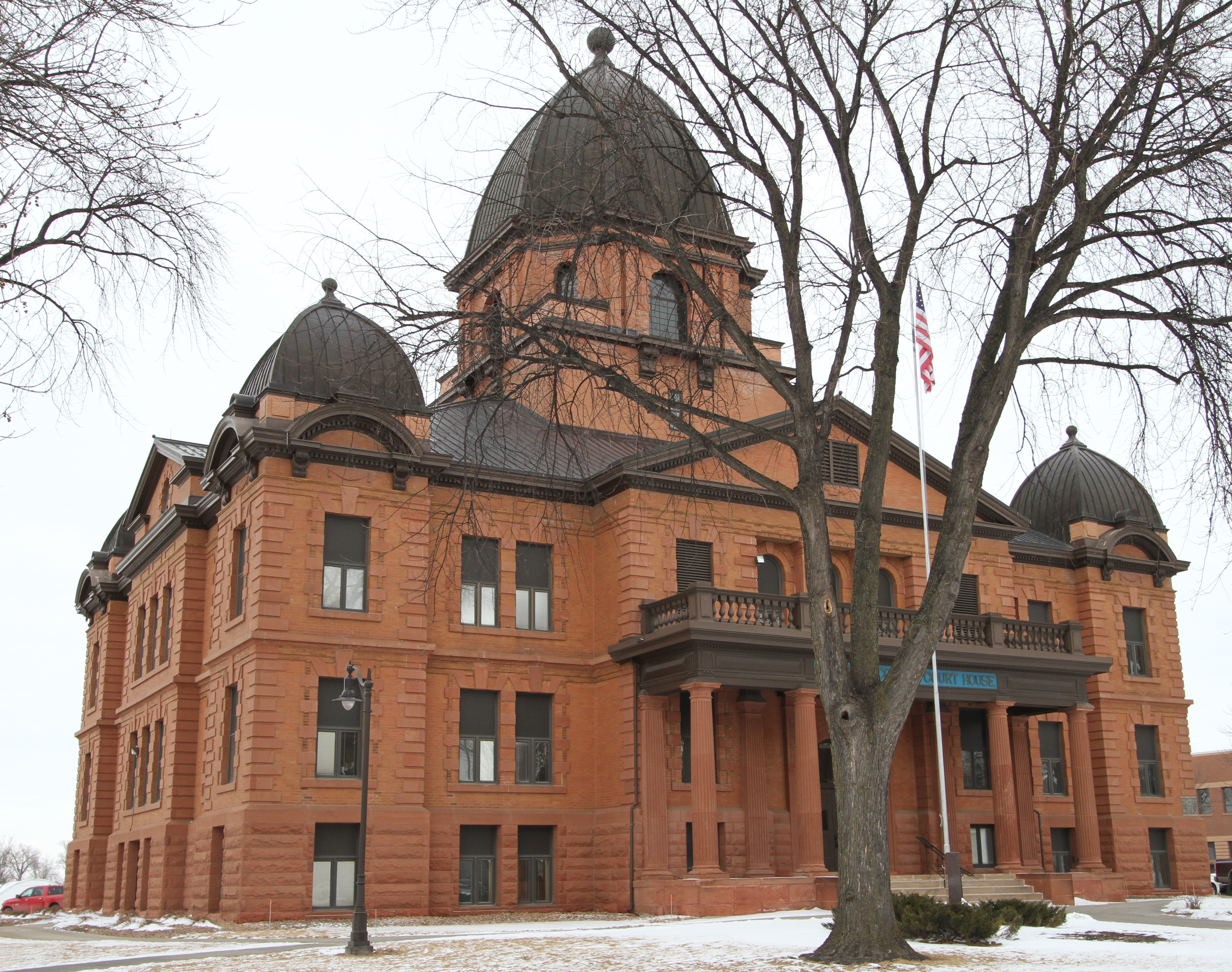
The courthouse from the southeast

The first courthouse in Renville County was built in Beaver Falls in 1872. It was originally built as a jail, at a cost of $2000. In 1889 a 40-by-60-foot (12 m × 18 m) wood-frame building was built, and the 1872 building was again used as the jail. In 1895 the city of Olivia won a battle to become the county seat, and court business was held in a local business building. A court decision returned the county seat to Beaver Falls for two years, but then Olivia finally won the county seat permanently in 1900. Architect Fremont D. Orff from Minneapolis designed the building, which was built at a cost of $88,000. The building has influences from a few different architectural styles. The corner pavilions and the central tower have segmented blue-green copper domes, suggesting Second Empire architecture. The center pavilion has a porch with balusters, fluted columns, and an oculus-pierced pediment, which reflects Georgian architecture.

The courthouse and jail were added to the National Register of Historic Places on June 13, 1986.
