= Edwin Joseph Martinson =

American businessman and politician (1891–1974)

Edwin Joseph Martinson (July 24, 1899 – November 17, 1974) was an American businessman and politician.

Martinson was born in Ortonville, Big Stone County, Minnesota and lived with his wife and family in Ortonville. Martinson was a carpenter, laborer, and a brakeman and conductor for the Milwaukee Railroad. Martinson served as the Ortonville City Assessor. He also served as the mayor of Ortonville and on the Ortonville City Council. Martinson served in the Minnesota House of Representatives from 1939 to 1948 and in 1951 and 1952. He died in a hospital in Ortonville, Minnesota.
