= Wayne County Courthouse (Nebraska) =

- U.S. National Register of Historic Places
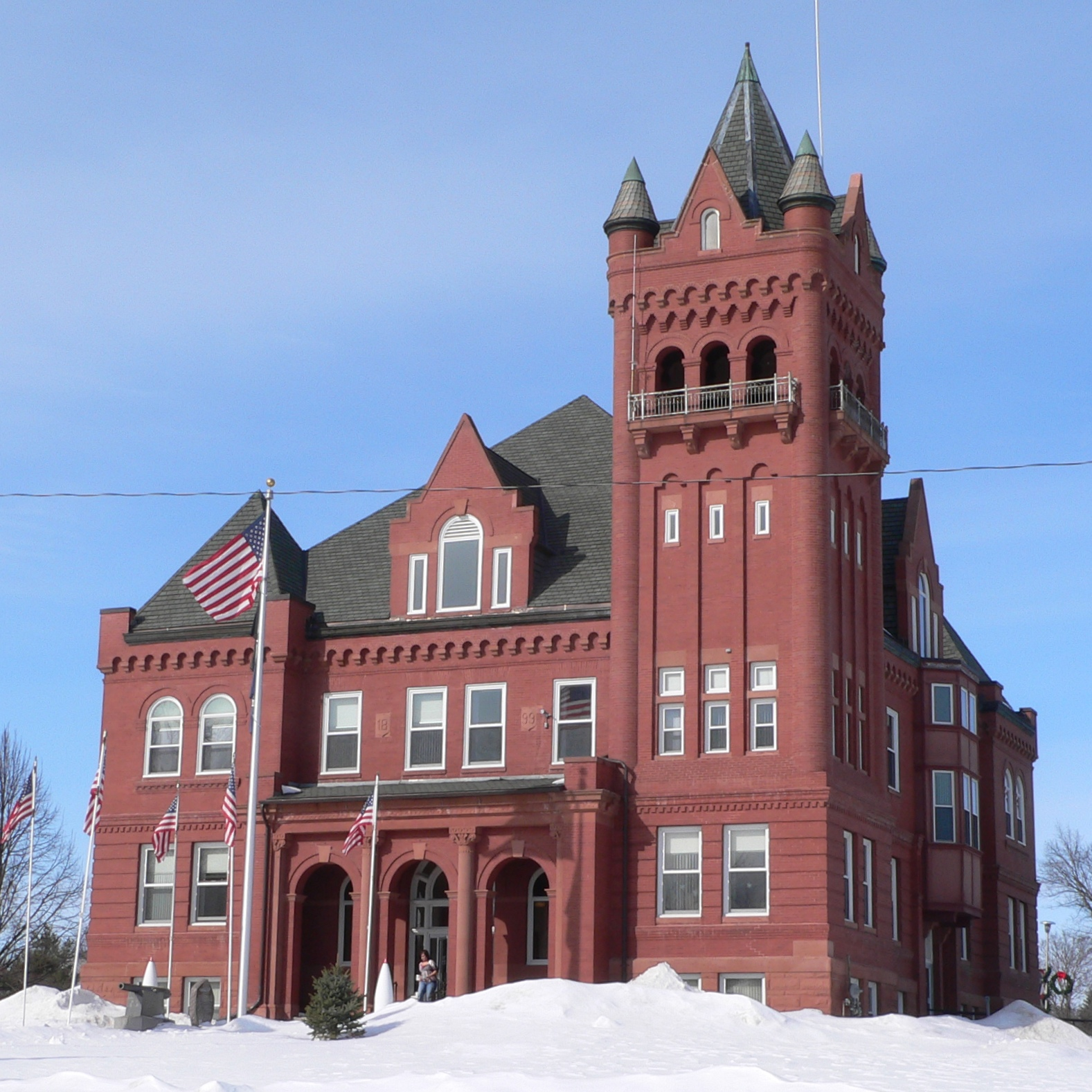

- Location within Nebraska Location within the United States
- Interactive map showing the location of Wayne County Courthouse
- Location: 510 Pearl St., Wayne, Nebraska
- Coordinates: 42°14′03″N 97°01′11″W
- Area: 4 acres (1.6 ha)
- Built: 1899
- Built by: Rowles & Moore
- Architect: Orff & Guilbert
- Architectural style: Romanesque, Richardsonian Romanesque
- NRHP reference No.: 79001458
- Added to NRHP: May 2, 1979

The Wayne County Courthouse, at 510 Pearl St. in Wayne, Nebraska, is a Richardsonian Romanesque-style historic courthouse that was built in 1899. It is a 70-by-80-foot (21 m × 24 m) building located in the center of a 4-acre (1.6 ha) square amidst, somewhat unexpectedly, a residential neighborhood. It was listed on the National Register of Historic Places in 1979.

Its cornerstone indicates that it was designed by Minneapolis architects Orff & Guilbert, but it seems to have been wholly designed by Fremont D. Orff (1856–1914) alone, and it was built by Omaha contractors Rowles & Moore.
