= Fargo and Southern Depot =

- Formerly listed on the U.S. National Register of Historic Places
- Location within North Dakota Location within the United States
- Location: 1101 2nd Ave. N., Fargo, North Dakota
- Coordinates: 46°52′43″N 96°47′45″W
- Area: less than 1 acre (0.40 ha)
- Built: 1884
- Architect: Fargo and Southern Railroad
- NRHP reference No.: 75001303

Significant dates
- Added to NRHP: April 14, 1975
- Removed from NRHP: May 27, 1980

The Fargo and Southern Depot is a historic railroad station in Fargo, North Dakota, United States. It was built in 1884 by the Fargo and Southern Railway.

The Fargo and Southern Railway was a combined effort of 23 Fargo businesses to build a railroad from Fargo to the Milwaukee Road at Ortonville, Minnesota. The first train ran on July 2, 1884, with the depot opening later that year. In time, the Fargo and Southern was sold to the Milwaukee Road. Passenger trains serviced the depot until December 31, 1931. The depot continued to see mixed train service until that too ended on October 31, 1956.

The depot was listed on the National Register of Historic Places in 1975 as the Fargo and Southern Depot, and delisted in 1980 after a fire in December 1974 severely damaged the building leading to its demolition.

Preceding station	Milwaukee Road	Following station
Terminus	Fargo – Ortonville	Saunders toward Ortonville
