= Red Lake County Courthouse =

- U.S. National Register of Historic Places
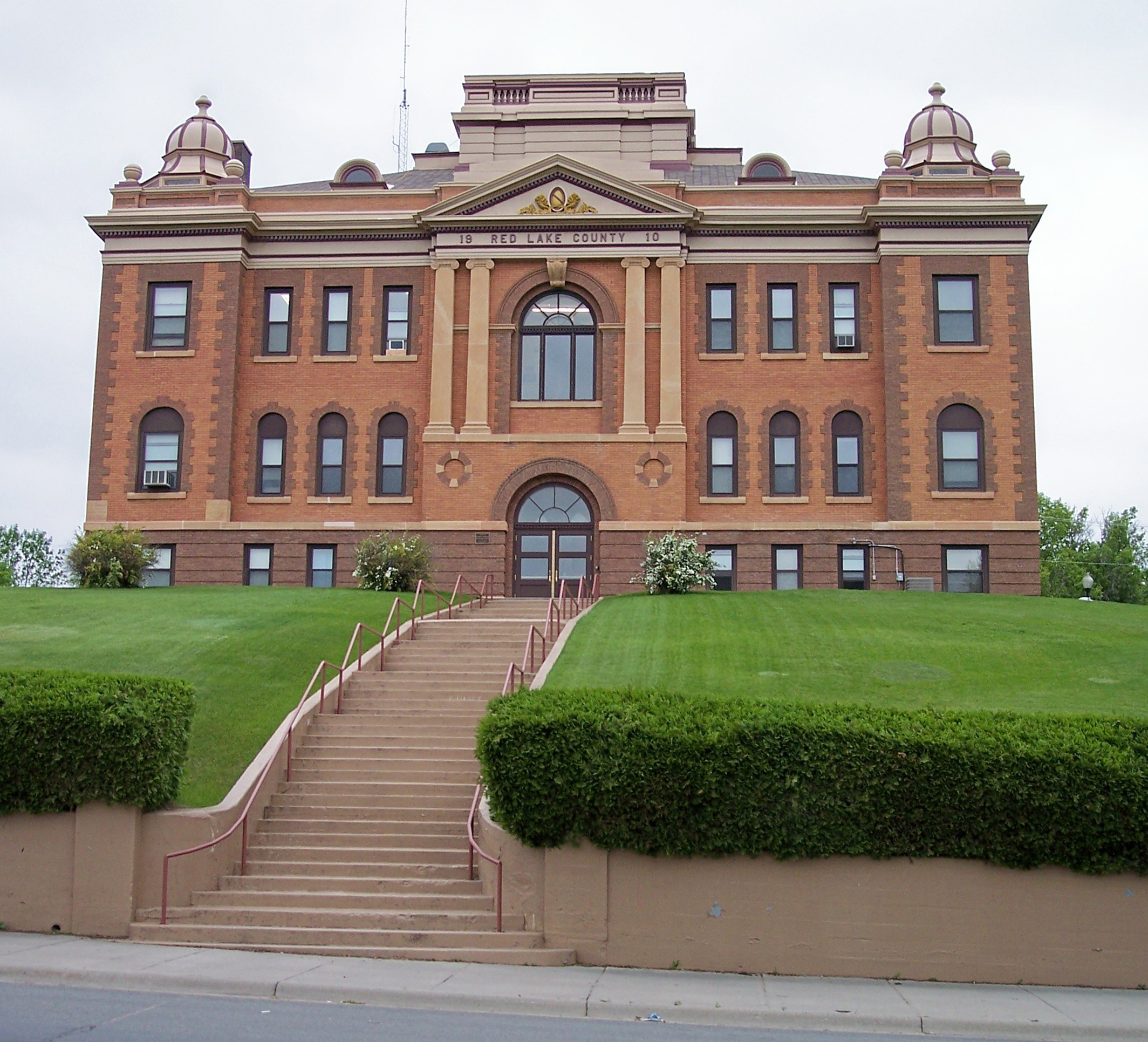

- Location within Minnesota Location within the United States
- Location: 124 Langevin, Red Lake Falls, Minnesota
- Coordinates: 47°53′5.3″N 96°16′27.5″W
- Area: less than one acre
- Built: 1911
- Architect: Fremont D. Orff, James Brady
- Architectural style: Beaux Arts
- NRHP reference No.: 83000941
- Added to NRHP: May 9, 1983

The Red Lake County Courthouse, located at 124 Langevin Avenue Red Lake Falls, Red Lake County in the U.S. state of Minnesota is a red brick Beaux Arts building featuring a small dome at each corner. Originally the building also had a large central dome, but it was removed in the 1940s. The courthouse was completed in 1911 at a cost of $37,070. The building was designed by Fremont D. Orff and James Brady. The front entrance of the courthouse is flanked by faux columns, topped by a classic pediment. The interior atrium is open to a two-story rotunda with arched openings to the second-level walkway.
