= Fremont D. Orff =

American architect (1856–1914)

- Born: Fremont Dayton Orff; 1856; Bangor, Maine, U.S.
- Died: February 16, 1914 (aged 57–58); Rochester, Minnesota, U.S.
- Occupation: Architect

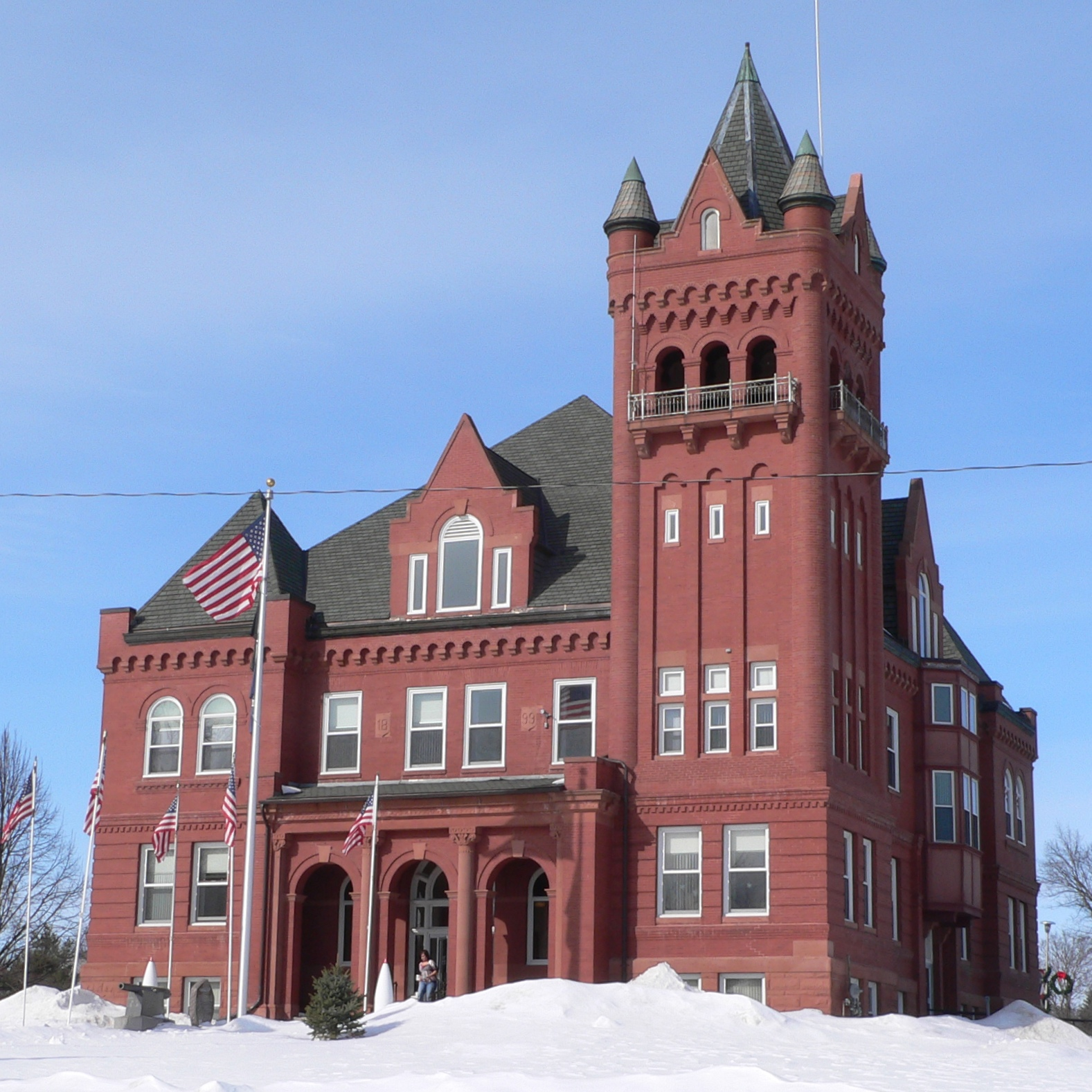
The Wayne County Courthouse in Wayne, Nebraska, designed by Orff & Guilbert and built in 1899.

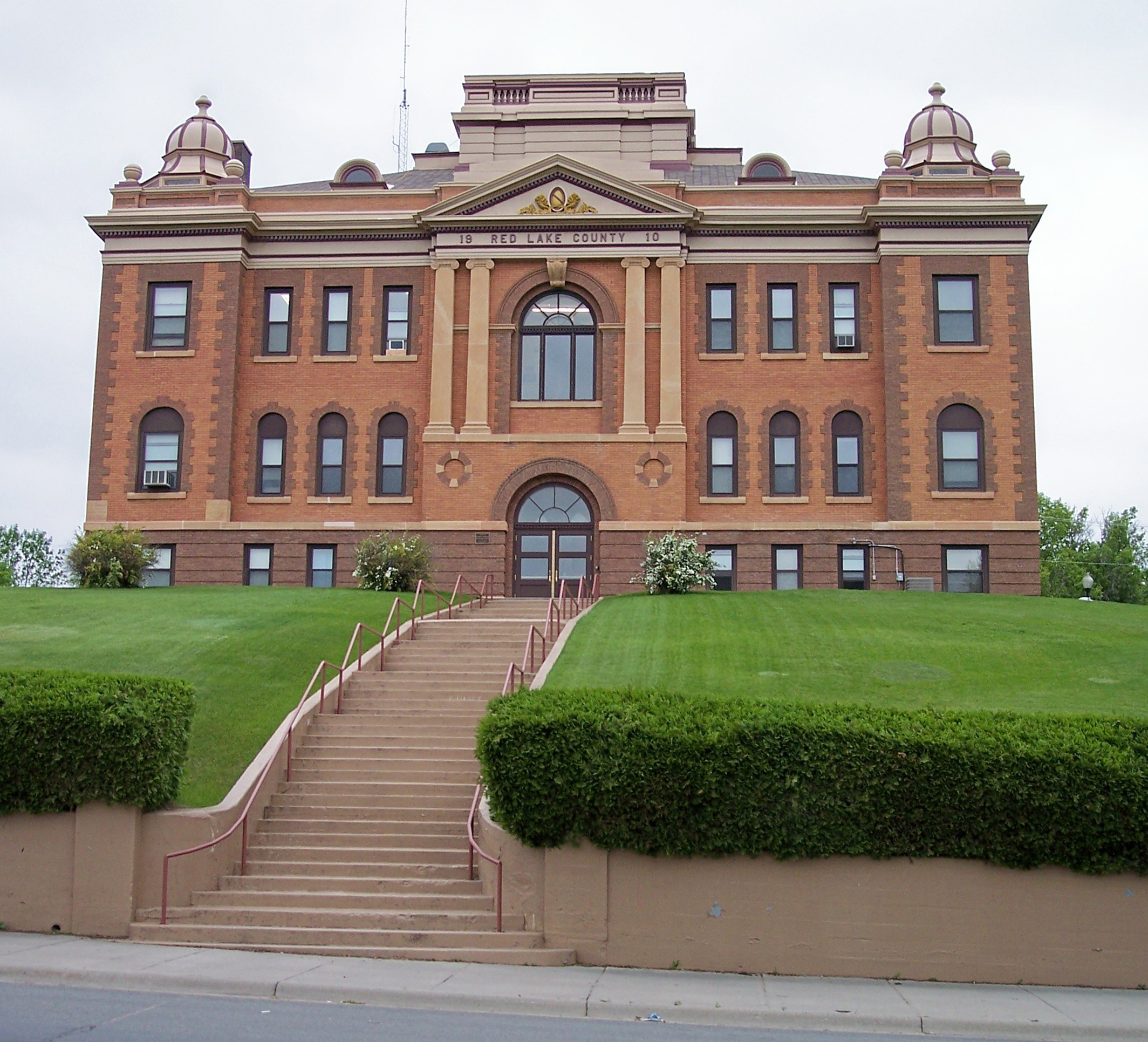
The Red Lake County Courthouse in Red Lake Falls, Minnesota designed from F. D. Orff and built in 1911.

Fremont Dayton Orff (1856 – February 16, 1914) was an American architect.

== Life and career ==
Fremont Dayton Orff was born in 1856 in Bangor, Maine to Edward F. Orff and Sarah (Yates) Orff. He was educated in the public schools and probably in architecture in the office of his elder brother, George W. Orff. The elder Orff left Bangor in the winter of 1878, settling in Minneapolis, Minnesota in the spring of 1879. He was quickly followed by his brother. After two additional years as a draftsman, Orff formed a partnership with his brother, known as Orff Brothers. As his elder brother gradually retired from practice, responsibilities in the firm gradually moved to Fremont D. and his designers, which included Francis W. Fitzpatrick and Edgar E. Joralemon. In 1893, the partnership was expanded to include Joralemon, and was known as Orff & Joralemon. When this partnership was dissolved in 1897, Fremont D. formed a new one with Ernest F. Guilbert, known as Orff & Guilbert. This was dissolved in 1899. Orff then continued to practice independently until 1912, when he retired due to declining health.

After his brother's retirement, Orff primarily focused on public buildings, in particular courthouses and schools.

== Personal life ==
Orff married in 1901, to Eleanor Cleaveland, daughter of Rev. Horace A. Cleveland of Minneapolis.

Orff died February 16, 1914, in Rochester, Minnesota, where he had moved to recover. He was 57 years old. He was buried in Lakewood Cemetery.

== Legacy ==
A number of his works are listed on the United States National Register of Historic Places.

== Architectural work (Note: For projects dated before 1897, see George W. Orff. Projects dated from 1897 to 1899 are credited to Orff & Guilbert, and projects dated after 1899 to Fremont D. Orff alone.) ==
- Worth County Courthouse, Grant City, Missouri (1898, NRHP 1983)
- Polk County Courthouse, Balsam Lake, Wisconsin (1899, NRHP 1982)
- Wayne County Courthouse, Wayne, Nebraska (1899, NRHP 1979)
- Park Rapids Jail, Park Rapids, Minnesota (1901, NRHP 1988)
- Big Stone County Courthouse, Ortonville, Minnesota (1902, NRHP 1985)
- Renville County Courthouse and Jail, Olivia, Minnesota (1902, NRHP 1986)
- Little Falls Carnegie Library, Little Falls, Minnesota (1905, NRHP 1980)
- Perham Village Hall and Fire Station, Perham, Minnesota (1906, NRHP 1986)
- Red Lake County Courthouse, Red Lake Falls, Minnesota (1911, NRHP 1983)
