= Agnes Gardner Eyre =

American pianist and composer

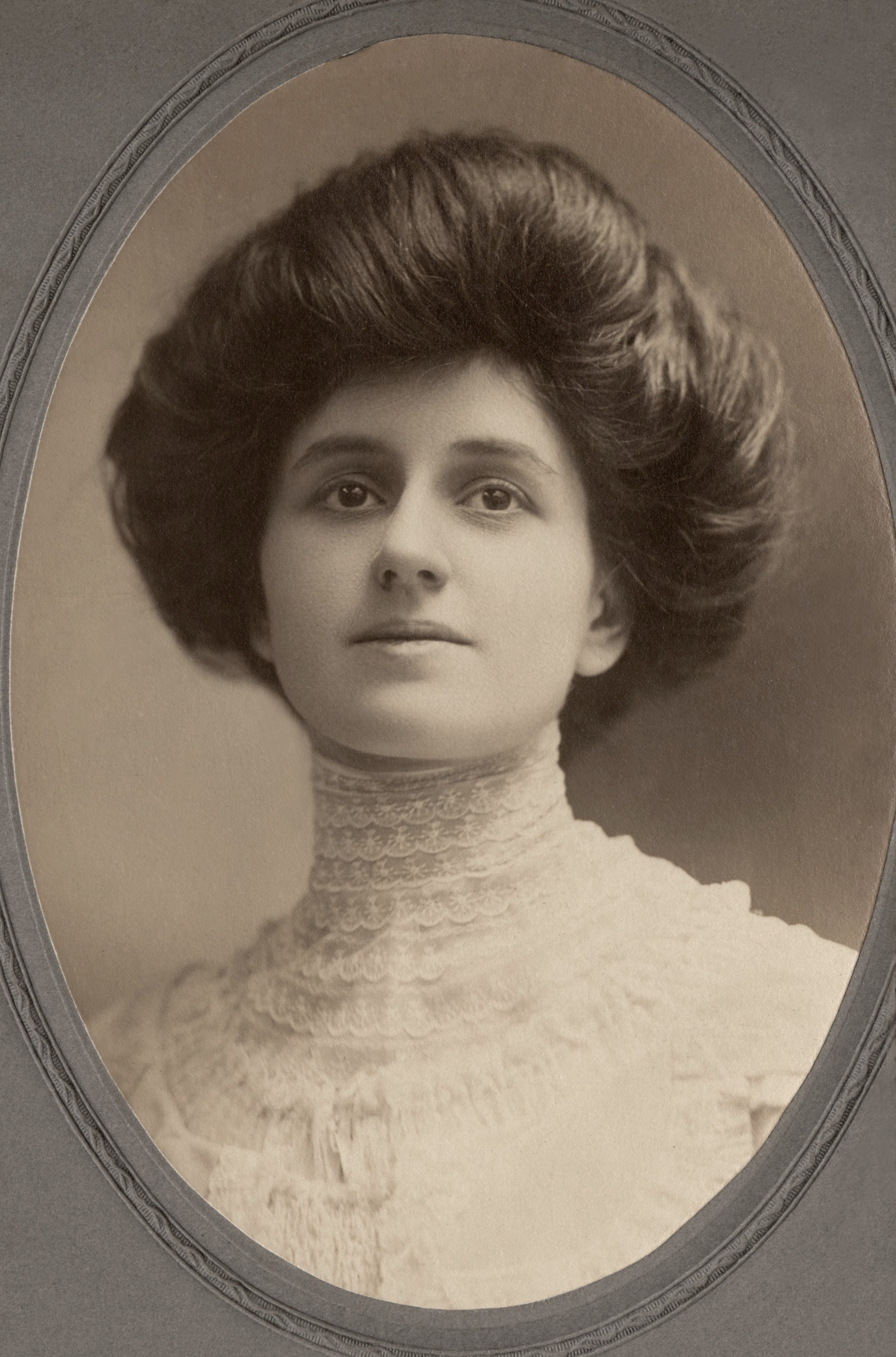
- Agnes Gardner Eyre (Boston Public Library, Philip Hale Collection)
- Born: December 10, 1881; Ortonville, Minnesota
- Died: July 16, 1950 (aged 68); Fresno, California
- Other names: Gardner Eyre, Agnes de Jahn
- Occupation: Pianist
- Relatives: Gunnar Jahn (brother-in-law)

Agnes Gardner Eyre de Jahn (December 10, 1881 – July 16, 1950) was an American pianist, composer, and piano teacher, a student of Theodor Leschetizky.

== Early life and education ==
Eyre was born in Ortonville, Minnesota, the daughter of Lewis John Eyre and Agnes Augusta Gardner Eyre (later Norrish). Her father was a salesman, born in England. She studied composition and harmony with George Whitefield Chadwick and Edward Shippen Barnes at the New England Conservatory of Music in Boston, and for four years with Theodor Leschetizky in Vienna.

== Career ==
Eyre was a concert pianist; she toured in Europe, Great Britain, and North America, and appeared with violinist Jan Kubelik and sopranos Corinne Rider-Kelsey, Abby Beecher Longyear and Ella Russell. She performed at the 1905 Proms. "She played with really brilliant success," said a reviewer in Santa Barbara in 1906.

As Gardner Eyre, she composed songs, hymns, and works for piano, including "Love Radiant", "Some Day", "Adoration", "God is Ever Near", "Be Thou Our Guide", "Were I a Pirate of the Sea" "Drifting", and "Beyond the Mist".

Eyre taught piano students at the Institute of Musical Art in New York, and in California in her later years. She attended the 1927 convention of the California Music Teachers Association. In 1931, she was guest soloist at the first concert of the Fresno Philharmonic Orchestra. She was a judge for the 1938 National Piano Playing Tournament, sponsored by the National Guild of Piano Teachers.

During World War I, Eyre served in the National League for Women's Service, with the rank of lieutenant. She organized an auxiliary transportation unit in Scarsdale, New York. She was a member of the New York Antivivisection Society.

== Personal life ==
Eyre married Norwegian-born Fredrik Wexelsen Jahn in 1909, in San Francisco. They divorced before 1930. Her brother-in-law was economist Gunnar Jahn. She died in 1950, aged 68 years, in Fresno, California.
