= Samuel Russell Barr =

American businessman and politician

Samuel Russell Barr (May 19, 1914 – July 26, 2001) was an American businessman and politician.

Barr was born in Forsyth, Rosebud County, Montana. He graduated from Ortonville High School in Ortonville, Big Stone County, Minnesota. Barr lived in Ortonville, Minnesota with his wife and family and was an electrical contractor. Barr served in the Minnesota House of Representatives from 1961 to 1972 as a member of the Liberal caucus.
