= Clinton, Minnesota =

Village in Minnesota, United States

Clinton
- City
- Location of Clinton, Minnesota
- Coordinates: 45°27′47″N 96°26′29″W
- Country: United States
- State: Minnesota
- County: Big Stone

Area
  - Total: 1.04 sq mi (2.70 km^{2})
  - Land: 0.96 sq mi (2.48 km^{2})
  - Water: 0.085 sq mi (0.22 km^{2})
- Elevation: 1,161 ft (354 m)

Population (2020)
  - Total: 386
  - Density: 403.2/sq mi (155.69/km^{2})
- Time zone: UTC-6 (Central (CST))
  - Summer (DST): UTC-5 (CDT)
- ZIP code: 56225
- Area code: 320
- FIPS code: 27-11980
- GNIS feature ID: 2393569
- Website: https://mnclinton.com/

Clinton is a city in Big Stone County, Minnesota, United States. The city was named for New York Governor DeWitt Clinton. The population was 386 at the 2020 census.

== History ==
The village was settled about 1877 as Central, Minnesota, with a post office of that name from 1878 to 1885. The name was changed to Clinton in 1885, and the village was platted. The Chicago, Milwaukee and St. Paul Railroad station, named Batavia, was moved to the village in 1885, but the station name was not changed to Clinton until the village was incorporated in 1890. The railroad loading platform, named Rupert, two miles south of the village, was moved to the village in 1890.

== Geography ==
According to the United States Census Bureau, the city has a total area of 1.03 square miles (2.67 km^{2}), of which, 0.95 square miles (2.46 km^{2}) is land and 0.08 square miles (0.21 km^{2}) is water. Clinton is the home to the Big Stone County Fair and Clinton-Graceville-Beardsley Elementary School.

== Demographics ==
Historical population
Census	Pop.	Note	%±
1900	346		—
1910	384		11.0%
1920	512		33.3%
1930	537		4.9%
1940	630		17.3%
1950	718		14.0%
1960	565		−21.3%
1970	608		7.6%
1980	622		2.3%
1990	574		−7.7%
2000	453		−21.1%
2010	449		−0.9%
2020	386		−14.0%
U.S. Decennial Census; 2020 Census

=== 2010 census ===
As of the census of 2010, there were 449 people, 201 households, and 115 families residing in the city. The population density was 472.6 inhabitants per square mile (182.5/km^{2}). There were 255 housing units at an average density of 268.4 per square mile (103.6/km^{2}). The racial makeup of the city was 99.6% White and 0.4% from other races. Hispanic or Latino of any race were 1.3% of the population.

There were 201 households, of which 26.9% had children under the age of 18 living with them, 45.8% were married couples living together, 7.5% had a female householder with no husband present, 4.0% had a male householder with no wife present, and 42.8% were non-families. 36.8% of all households were made up of individuals, and 20.4% had someone living alone who was 65 years of age or older. The average household size was 2.21 and the average family size was 2.93.

The median age in the city was 43.6 years. 23.2% of residents were under the age of 18; 6.3% were between the ages of 18 and 24; 21.8% were from 25 to 44; 26% were from 45 to 64; and 22.5% were 65 years of age or older. The gender makeup of the city was 47.7% male and 52.3% female.

=== 2000 census ===
As of the census of 2000, there were 453 people, 195 households, and 118 families residing in the city. The population density was 471.0 inhabitants per square mile (181.9/km^{2}). There were 230 housing units at an average density of 239.1 per square mile (92.3/km^{2}). The racial makeup of the city was 97.79% White, 1.10% Native American, 0.88% Asian, and 0.22% from two or more races.

There were 195 households, out of which 28.7% had children under the age of 18 living with them, 53.3% were married couples living together, 5.1% had a female householder with no husband present, and 39.0% were non-families. 36.9% of all households were made up of individuals, and 17.9% had someone living alone who was 65 years of age or older. The average household size was 2.29 and the average family size was 3.04.

In the city, the population was spread out, with 25.6% under the age of 18, 8.4% from 18 to 24, 23.4% from 25 to 44, 21.9% from 45 to 64, and 20.8% who were 65 years of age or older. The median age was 40 years. For every 100 females, there were 101.3 males. For every 100 females age 18 and over, there were 92.6 males.

The median income for a household in the city was $31,591, and the median income for a family was $37,273. Males had a median income of $25,938 versus $18,958 for females. The per capita income for the city was $17,469. About 5.8% of families and 13.9% of the population were below the poverty line, including 5.8% of those under age 18 and 8.6% of those age 65 or over.

== Attractions ==
Highway 75 runs through the town, making it relatively accessible to travelers. The former train station is now a history museum.

Clinton is situated adjacent to beautiful Eli Lake. Every year, the world's longest lasting ice golf tournament, the Arctic Open, takes place on this lake. It has been held annually for over 30 years, and typically draws crowds in the hundreds. The Big Stone County Fair is held each summer (usually July) at the Fairgrounds located on the west edge of the city limits. Grandstand events usually consist of demolition derbies, a variety of car races, and most recently, a rodeo. Other attractions are live music, a Carnival, an Old Thyme Tractor Display, as well as multiple 4-H exhibits.
