= Ortonville, Minnesota =

City in Minnesota, United States

- City
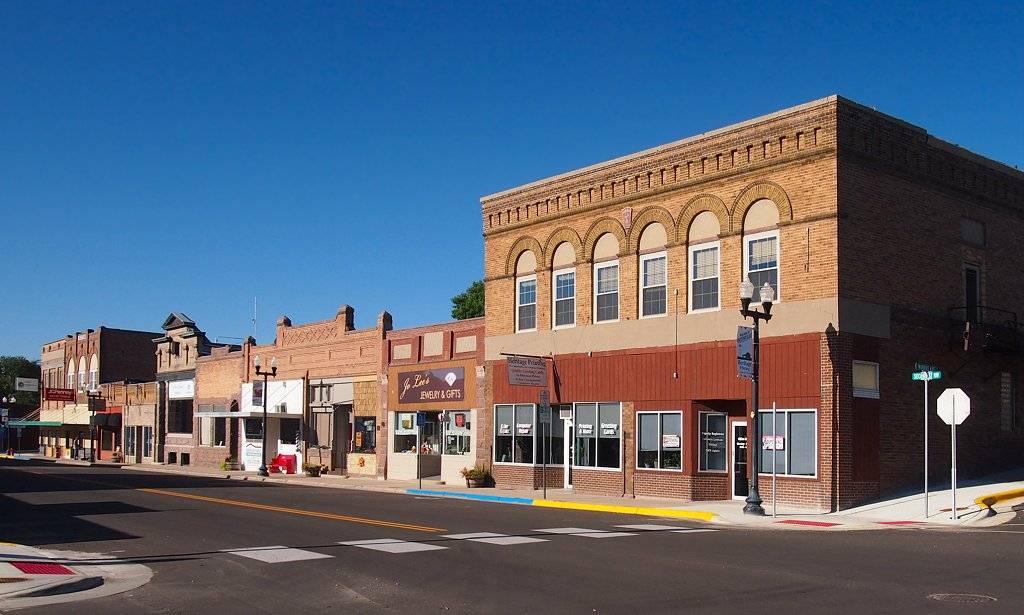
- Ortonville's historic downtown

- Location of Ortonville within Big Stone County, Minnesota
- Coordinates: 45°18′06″N 96°26′29″W
- Country: United States
- State: Minnesota
- Counties: Big Stone
- Founded: 1872
- Incorporated: 1881

Area
  - Total: 4.90 sq mi (12.68 km^{2})
  - Land: 4.19 sq mi (10.86 km^{2})
  - Water: 0.70 sq mi (1.82 km^{2})
- Elevation: 1,056 ft (322 m)

Population (2020)
  - Total: 2,021
  - Estimate (2021): 2,011
  - Density: 482.0/sq mi (186.12/km^{2})
- Time zone: UTC-6 (CST)
  - Summer (DST): UTC-5 (CDT)
- ZIP code: 56278
- Area code: 320
- FIPS code: 27-48706
- GNIS feature ID: 2396087
- Website: mnortonville.com

Ortonville is a city in and the county seat of Big Stone County in the U.S. state of Minnesota at the southern tip of Big Stone Lake, along the South Dakota border. The population was 2,021 at the 2020 census. Big Stone Lake State Park is nearby.

== History ==
Ortonville was platted in 1872 by and named for Cornelius Knute Orton. Ortonville was incorporated as a city in 1881. The Big Stone County Courthouse was built in 1902.

== Geography ==
According to the United States Census Bureau, the city has an area of 3.56 square miles (9.22 km^{2}), of which 3.51 square miles (9.09 km^{2}) is land and 0.05 square miles (0.13 km^{2}) is water.

U.S. Highways 12 and 75 bypass the city and Minnesota State Highway 7 is one of the main routes in the city.

== Demographics ==
Historical population
| Census | Pop. | Note | %± |
|---|---|---|---|
| 1890 | 768 | | — |
| 1900 | 1,247 | | 62.4% |
| 1910 | 1,774 | | 42.3% |
| 1920 | 1,758 | | −0.9% |
| 1930 | 2,017 | | 14.7% |
| 1940 | 2,469 | | 22.4% |
| 1950 | 2,577 | | 4.4% |
| 1960 | 2,674 | | 3.8% |
| 1970 | 2,665 | | −0.3% |
| 1980 | 2,550 | | −4.3% |
| 1990 | 2,205 | | −13.5% |
| 2000 | 2,158 | | −2.1% |
| 2010 | 1,916 | | −11.2% |
| 2020 | 2,021 | | 5.5% |
| 2021 (est.) | 2,011 | | −0.5% |
U.S. Decennial Census; 2020 Census

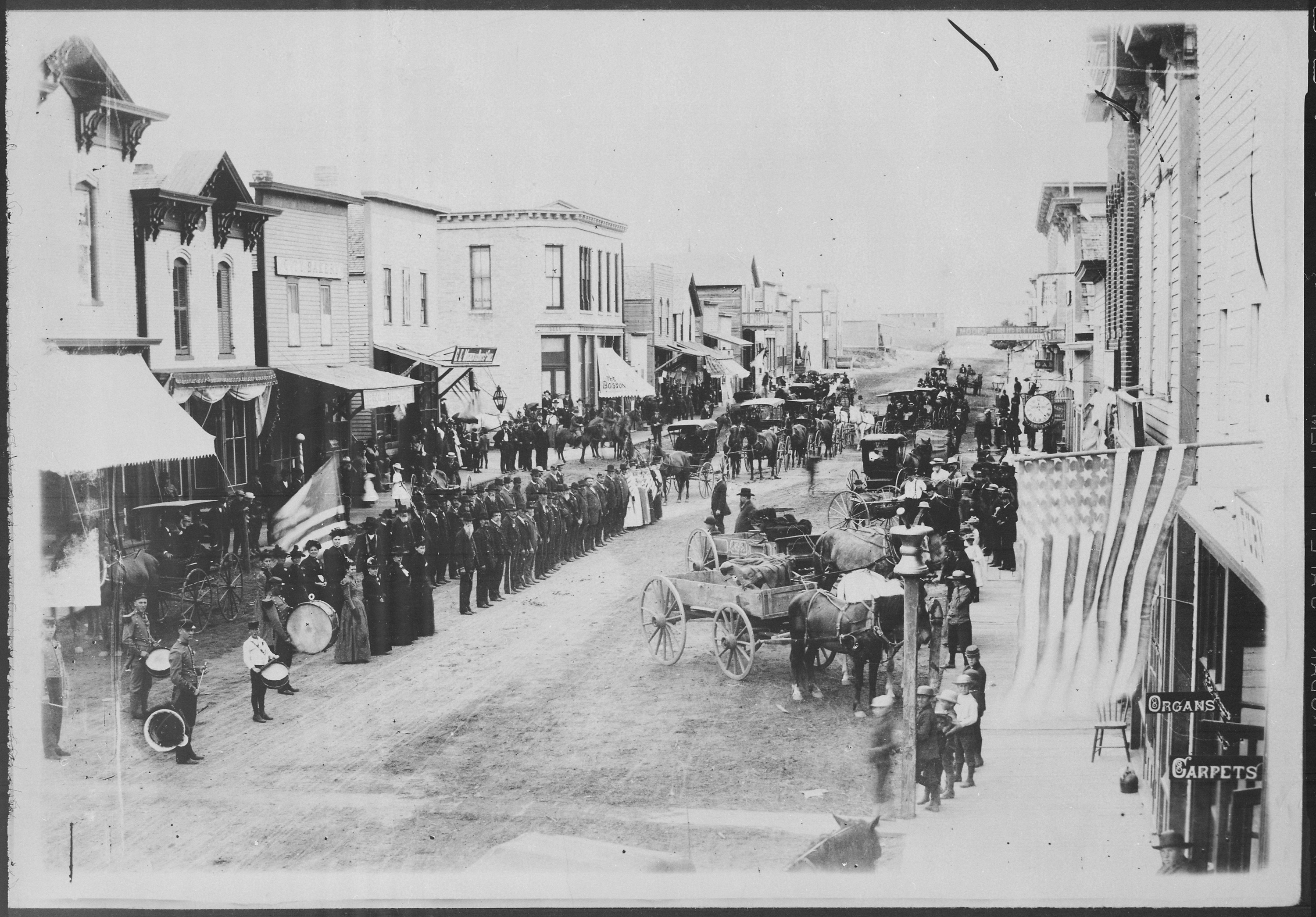
Civil War veterans on review in Ortonville 4th of July celebration, 1880s

=== 2020 census ===
As of the 2020 census, Ortonville had a population of 2,021. The median age was 47.3 years. 20.7% of residents were under the age of 18 and 29.3% of residents were 65 years of age or older. For every 100 females there were 93.8 males, and for every 100 females age 18 and over there were 87.9 males age 18 and over.

0.0% of residents lived in urban areas, while 100.0% lived in rural areas.

There were 915 households in Ortonville, of which 24.0% had children under the age of 18 living in them. Of all households, 44.6% were married-couple households, 20.3% were households with a male householder and no spouse or partner present, and 29.1% were households with a female householder and no spouse or partner present. About 38.5% of all households were made up of individuals and 21.5% had someone living alone who was 65 years of age or older.

There were 1,073 housing units, of which 14.7% were vacant. The homeowner vacancy rate was 4.6% and the rental vacancy rate was 9.3%.

Racial composition as of the 2020 census
| Race | Number | Percent |
|---|---|---|
| White | 1,866 | 92.3% |
| Black or African American | 5 | 0.2% |
| American Indian and Alaska Native | 24 | 1.2% |
| Asian | 9 | 0.4% |
| Native Hawaiian and Other Pacific Islander | 0 | 0.0% |
| Some other race | 24 | 1.2% |
| Two or more races | 93 | 4.6% |
| Hispanic or Latino (of any race) | 86 | 4.3% |

=== 2010 census ===
As of the census of 2010, there were 1,916 people, 884 households, and 509 families living in the city. The population density was 545.9 inhabitants per square mile (210.8/km^{2}). There were 1,090 housing units at an average density of 310.5 per square mile (119.9/km^{2}). The racial makeup of the city was 97.0% White, 0.3% African American, 0.6% Native American, 0.1% Asian, 0.7% from other races, and 1.3% from two or more races. Hispanic or Latino of any race were 1.0% of the population.

There were 884 households, of which 22.5% had children under the age of 18 living with them, 45.5% were married couples living together, 8.7% had a female householder with no husband present, 3.4% had a male householder with no wife present, and 42.4% were non-families. 38.6% of all households were made up of individuals, and 21.2% had someone living alone who was 65 years of age or older. The average household size was 2.07 and the average family size was 2.71.

The median age in the city was 49.8 years. 19.7% of residents were under the age of 18; 6.2% were between the ages of 18 and 24; 18.5% were from 25 to 44; 26.7% were from 45 to 64; and 28.8% were 65 years of age or older. The gender makeup of the city was 46.5% male and 53.5% female.

=== 2000 census ===
As of the census of 2000, there were 2,158 people, 923 households, and 594 families living in the city. The population density was 635.8 inhabitants per square mile (245.5/km^{2}). There were 1,125 housing units at an average density of 331.4 per square mile (128.0/km^{2}). The racial makeup of the city was 97.68% White, 0.42% African American, 0.88% Native American, 0.09% Asian, 0.28% from other races, and 0.65% from two or more races. Hispanic or Latino of any race were 0.56% of the population.

There were 923 households, out of which 28.1% had children under the age of 18 living with them, 54.0% were married couples living together, 8.0% had a female householder with no husband present, and 35.6% were non-families. 33.6% of all households were made up of individuals, and 20.4% had someone living alone who was 65 years of age or older. The average household size was 2.25 and the average family size was 2.88.

In the city, the population was spread out, with 23.9% under the age of 18, 5.1% from 18 to 24, 20.2% from 25 to 44, 24.6% from 45 to 64, and 26.1% who were 65 years of age or older. The median age was 45 years. For every 100 females, there were 84.6 males. For every 100 females age 18 and over, there were 79.8 males.

The median income for a household in the city was $30,614, and the median income for a family was $39,375. Males had a median income of $30,590 versus $20,179 for females. The per capita income for the city was $17,132. About 7.2% of families and 9.2% of the population were below the poverty line, including 9.5% of those under age 18 and 10.1% of those age 65 or over.

== Politics ==
Presidential election results

2020 Precinct Results Spreadsheet2016 Precinct Results Spreadsheet2012 Precinct Results Spreadsheet2008 Precinct Results Spreadsheet2004 Precinct Results Spreadsheet2000 Precinct Results Spreadsheet
| Year | Republican | Democratic | Third parties |
|---|---|---|---|
| 2020 | 60.0% 648 | 37.4% 404 | 2.6% 28 |
| 2016 | 60.5% 617 | 31.9% 325 | 7.6% 77 |
| 2012 | 52.6% 535 | 45.9% 467 | 1.5% 16 |
| 2008 | 50.0% 545 | 48.0% 523 | 2.0% 21 |
| 2004 | 54.9% 628 | 43.3% 495 | 1.8% 20 |
| 2000 | 50.4% 545 | 42.9% 464 | 6.7% 72 |

== Education ==
Public schools in independent district 2903 (Ortonville Public School), which covers Ortonville, include Ortonville Secondary School and James Knoll Elementary School. The schools are housed in one building, making the public education in Ortonville K-12. Ortonville's athletic teams are called the Trojans, and the school's colors are orange and black. The district has no private schools.

The Ortonville Public Library is a part of the Pioneerland Library System.

There is no university in Ortonville, but high school students may take college-level courses via the College in the Schools program.

== Media ==
=== Newspaper ===
The Ortonville Independent is a weekly newspaper published in Ortonville on Tuesdays. As of 2019, it had a circulation of 1,911 and was owned by the Kaercher Group.

=== AM radio ===
AM radio stations
| Frequency | Call sign | Name | Format | Owner | City |
|---|---|---|---|---|---|
| 1350 AM | KDIO | Real Country | Country | Armada Media | Ortonville |

=== FM radio ===
FM radio stations
| Frequency | Call sign | Name | Format | Owner | Target city/market | City of license |
|---|---|---|---|---|---|---|
| 101.5 FM | KCGN | Praise FM | Contemporary Christian | Christian Heritage Broadcasting | Ortonville | Ortonville |
| 106.3 FM | KPHR | Power 106.3 | Classic Rock | Armada Media | Watertown | Ortonville |

== Notable people ==
- Samuel Russell Barr, Minnesota state legislator
- Agnes Gardner Eyre, pianist and composer
- Mike Hunt, former professional American football player.
- Dan Jurgens, comic book writer and artist, known for his work on the Superman comic books
- Edwin Joseph Martinson, member of the Minnesota House of Representatives
- Liz Olson, member of the Minnesota House of Representatives
